= Saint-Germain-des-Prés (church) =

Abbey in Paris, France

Church of Saint-Germain-des-Prés Église Saint-Germain-des-Prés
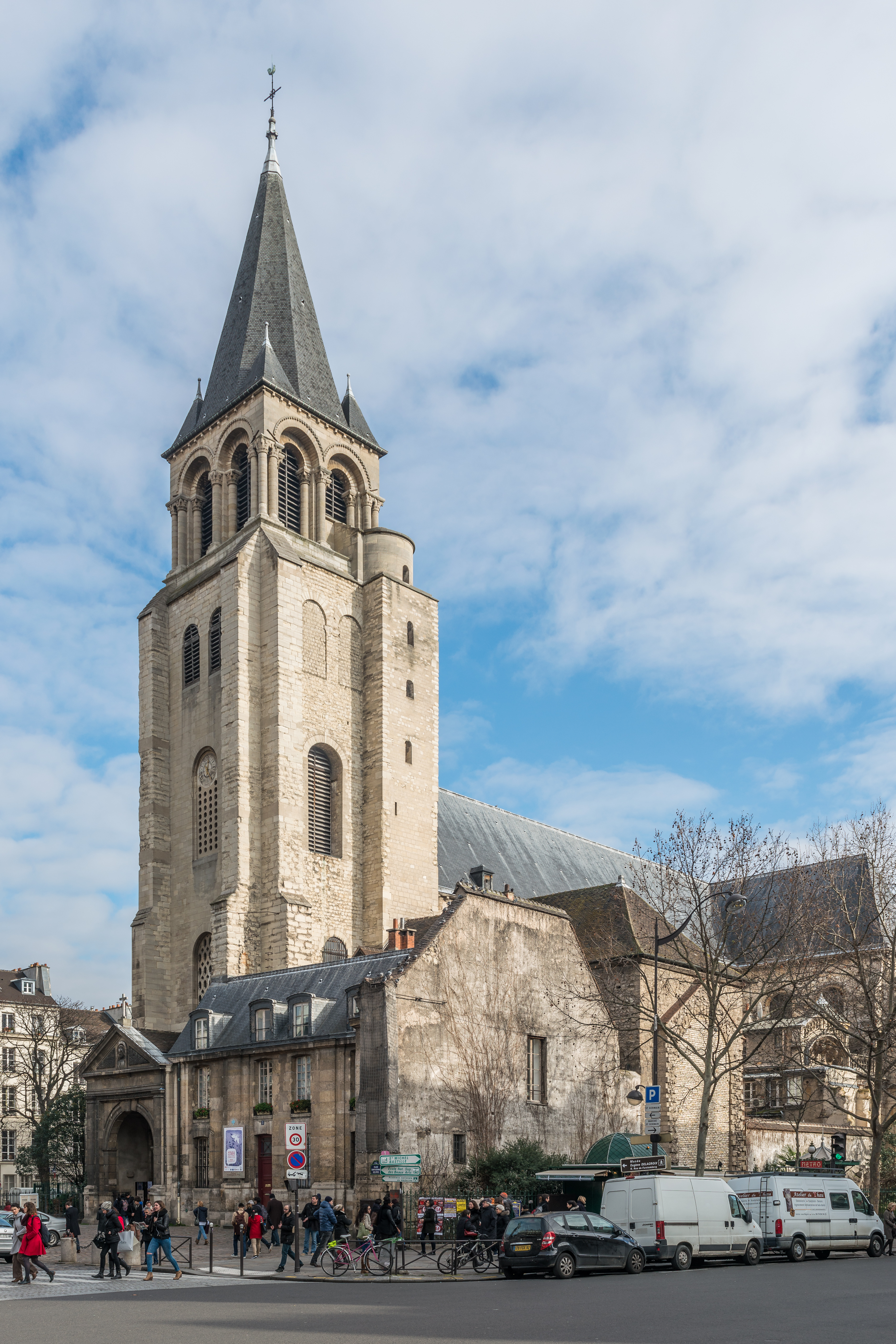
- Church of Saint-Germain-des-Prés
- Church of Saint-Germain-des-Prés; Église Saint-Germain-des-Prés
- 48°51′14″N 2°20′04″E
- Location: Paris, France
- Denomination: Roman Catholic Church
- Churchmanship: Roman

History
- Status: Active

Architecture
- Architectural type: Church
- Style: Gothic
- Groundbreaking: 543; 1483 years ago
- Completed: 1641; 385 years ago

Specifications
- Height: 20 m (65 ft 7 in)
- Materials: Stone

Administration
- Archdiocese: Paris

Monument historique
- Official name: Église Saint-Germain-des-Prés
- Type: Classé
- Designated: 1862
- Reference no.: PA00088509

The Church of Saint-Germain-des-Prés (French pronunciation: [sɛ̃ ʒɛʁmɛ̃ de pʁe]) is a Catholic parish church located in the Saint-Germain-des-Prés quarter of Paris. It was originally the church of a Benedictine abbey founded in 558 by Childebert I, the son of Clovis, King of the Franks. The abbey was destroyed by the Vikings, rebuilt, and renamed in the 8th century for Saint Germain, a 6th century bishop. It was rebuilt with elements in the new Gothic style in the 11th century, and was given the earliest flying buttresses in the Ile de France in the 12th century. It is considered the oldest existing church in Paris.

Originally located outside the walls of medieval Paris, in the fields and meadows of the Left Bank, known as "les Prés", the church was the center of an important abbey complex, famous for its scholarship and its production of illuminated manuscripts, and was the burial place of Germain, and also of Childebert and other rulers of the Merovingian Dynasty. Most of the Abbey, except for the chapel and the Bishop's palace, was destroyed during the French Revolution. The chapel was subsequently restored and became the parish church.

== History ==
=== Origins ===
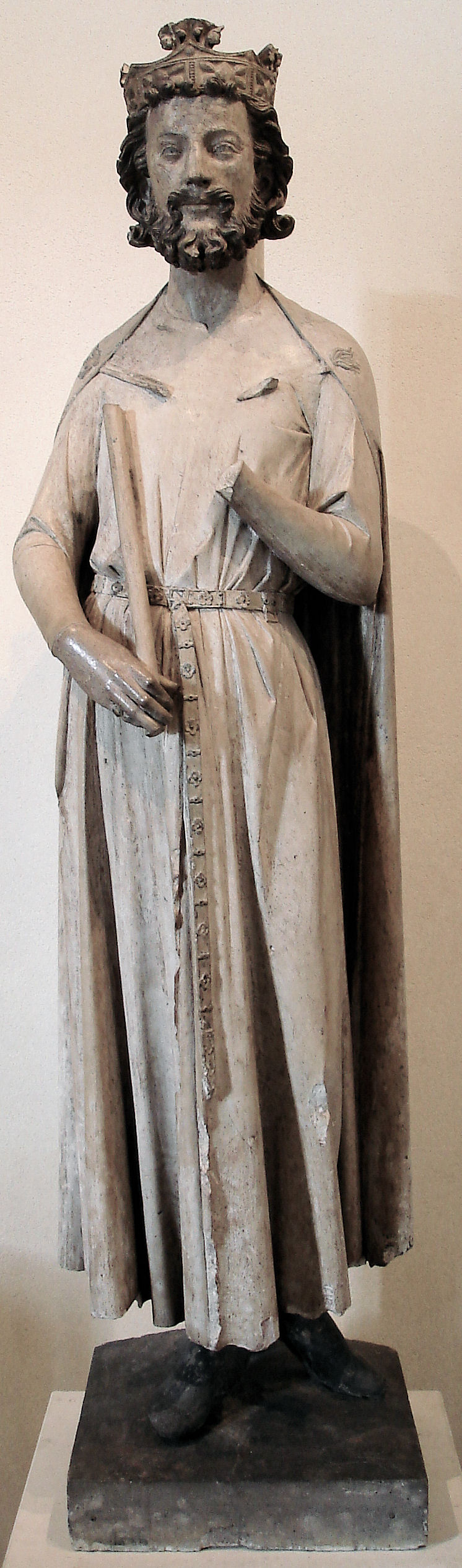
Childebert I, the founder (Louvre)

A Roman temple was located close to the site of the church, and a Roman road, parallel to the Seine, passed by the site, built well above the river to avoid flooding.

The abbey was founded in the 6th century by Childebert I (ruled 511–558), the son of Clovis I, the first King of the Franks. It was built especially to display two important relics acquired by Childebert during the siege of Zaragoza in Spain; a fragment of the True Cross and a fragment of the tunic of the martyr Saint Vincent. The first abbot was Droctovaeus, a pupil of the Bishop Saint Germain.

The abbey was formally dedicated in 558, the same year that Childebert died. His tomb was placed within the church and the Abbey became the first necropolis for the tombs of the early Kings of France, before this function was transferred to the Basilica of Saint-Denis. The basilica and the monastery were first dedicated to the Holy Cross and to Saint Vincent, then, in about 754, to Saint Germain of Paris, a noted bishop of Paris whose tomb was placed in the church in 576. The tombs were later removed, and no medieval tombs remain in the church.

The church and monastery were destroyed twice by the Vikings during their invasions at the end of the 9th century. The abbey church was rebuilt by the Abbé Morard at the 10th century, and the rest of the monastery by the end of the 13th century. The first four levels of the bell tower, the nave and the transept date from this period. A number of carved column capitals and vestiges of frescoes from this period are also found in the church.

The abbey was used by French monarchs to host visiting kings, such as King Edward I of England in 1286 who used it as a base whilst visiting Philip IV of France in the Louvre

Under royal patronage the Abbey became one of the most important centers of scholarship in Europe. In the Eleventh century it housed an important scriptorium which produced scholarly manuscripts which were distributed throughout Europe. It remained a center of spiritual, intellectual and artistic activity until the end of the 18th century.

=== The Gothic Church ===
Beginning in the 12th century, the church was updated with elements of the new style of Gothic architecture. The present choir of the church was built in the middle of the 12th century. The newly rebuilt church was consecrated by Pope Alexander III on 21 April 1163, The flying buttresses, the first in the Ile-de-France, were added at the end of the 12th century. The other buildings of the monastery were gradually rebuilt during the 13th century. These included a new Abbey church by architect Pierre de Montreuil inspired by the newly built Saint Chapelle. This new "Lady Chapel" was demolished in 1802, shortly after the end of the French Revolution, though vestiges remain in the small park on Rue de l'Abbaye next to the entrance to the Church.

The abbey church's west end tower was pierced by a portal, completed in the twelfth century, which collapsed in 1604 and was replaced in 1606 by the present classicising portal, by Marcel Le Roy. Its choir, with its apsidal east end, provides an early example of flying buttresses.

The Wall of Philip II Augustus built during the reign of Philip II of France (1200–1214) did not encompass the abbey, leaving the residents to fend for themselves. This also had the effect of splitting the Abbey's holdings into two. A new refectory was built for the monastery by Pierre de Montreuil between 1239 and 1244.

In 1621, a new order of Benedictine Monks, the Congregation of Saint Maur, was founded at Saint-Germain. They were particularly devoted to research and scholarship, They trained monks to collect and study texts on varied subjects and produced very fine illuminated manuscripts, which circulated throughout Europe, and made Paris one of the leading academic centres of the continent.

Until the late 17th century, the Abbey owned most of the land in the Left Bank west of the current Boulevard Saint-Michel and had administrative autonomy in it, most clearly for the part outside the walls of Paris. Louis-César de Bourbon, son of Louis XIV and Madame de Montespan, was an abbot here. The tomb of philosopher René Descartes is located in one of the church's side chapels.

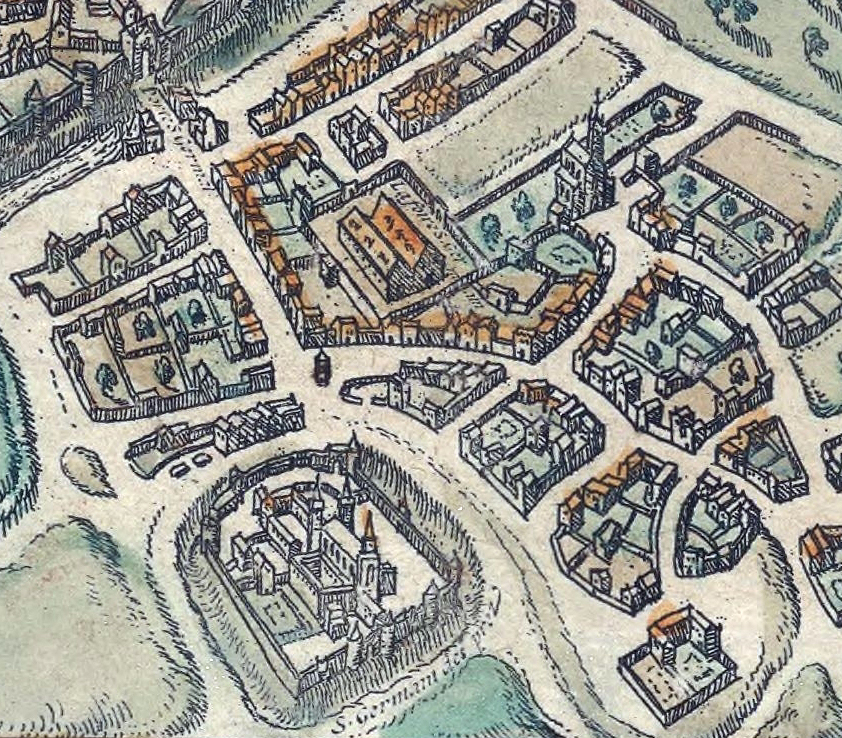
The abbey in 1530 (bottom left)

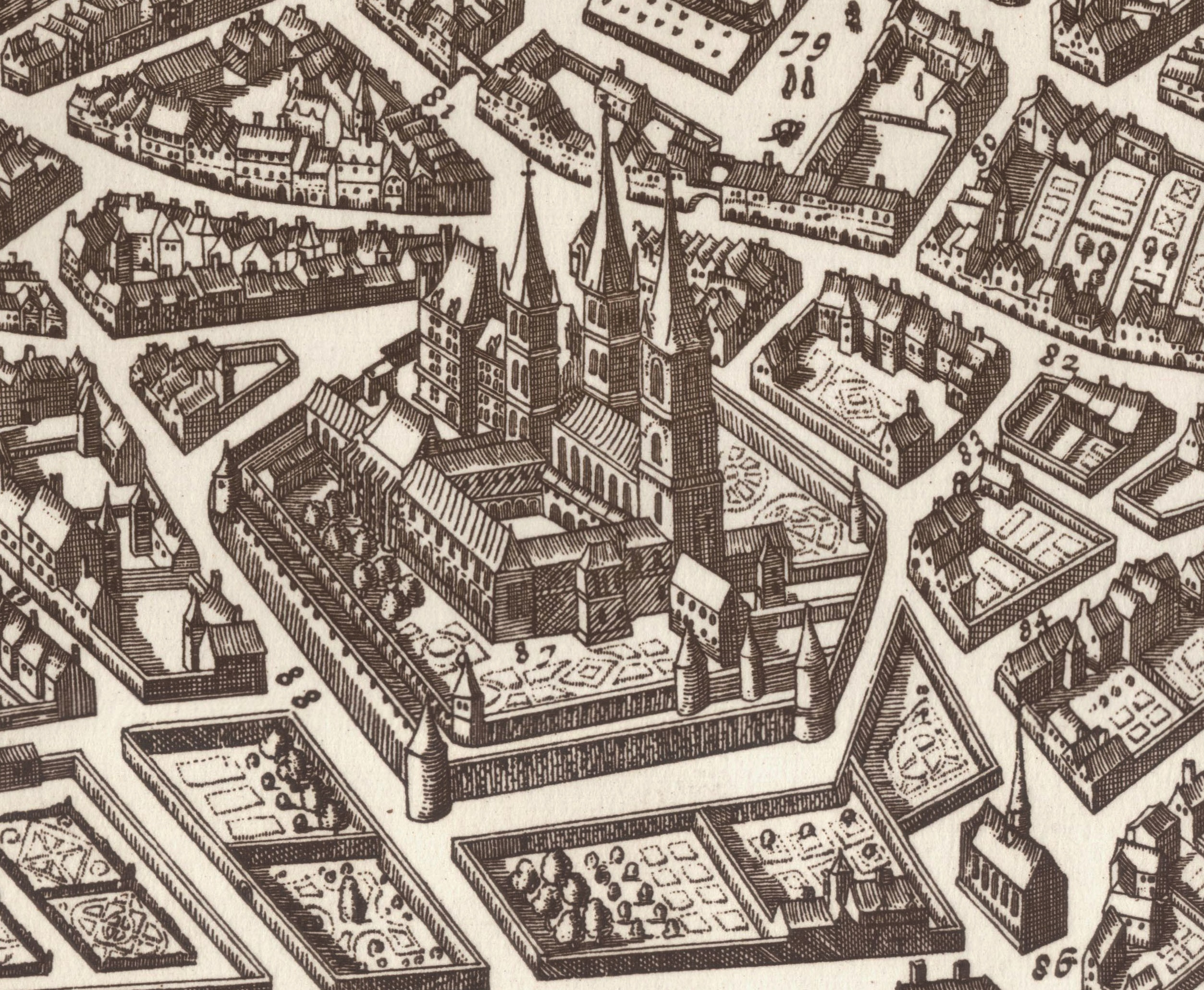
The church and Abbey in 1618

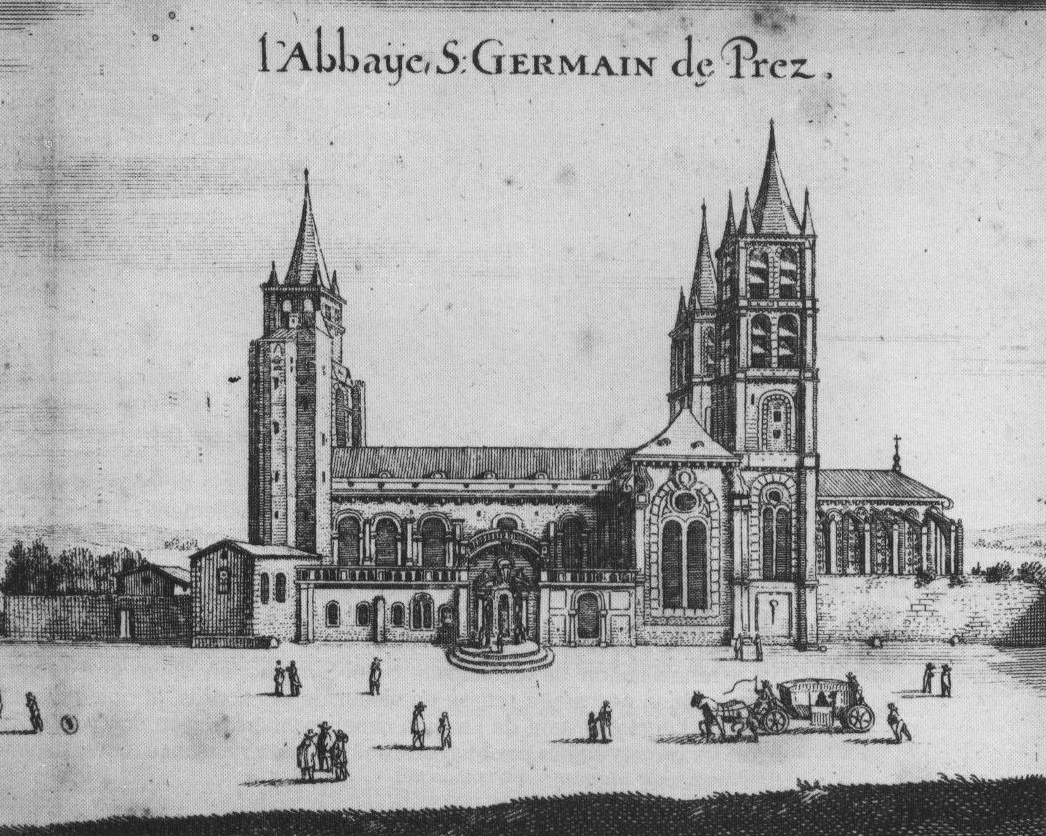
The church in the 17th century

=== The abbey during the Revolution ===
(see also: September Massacres)

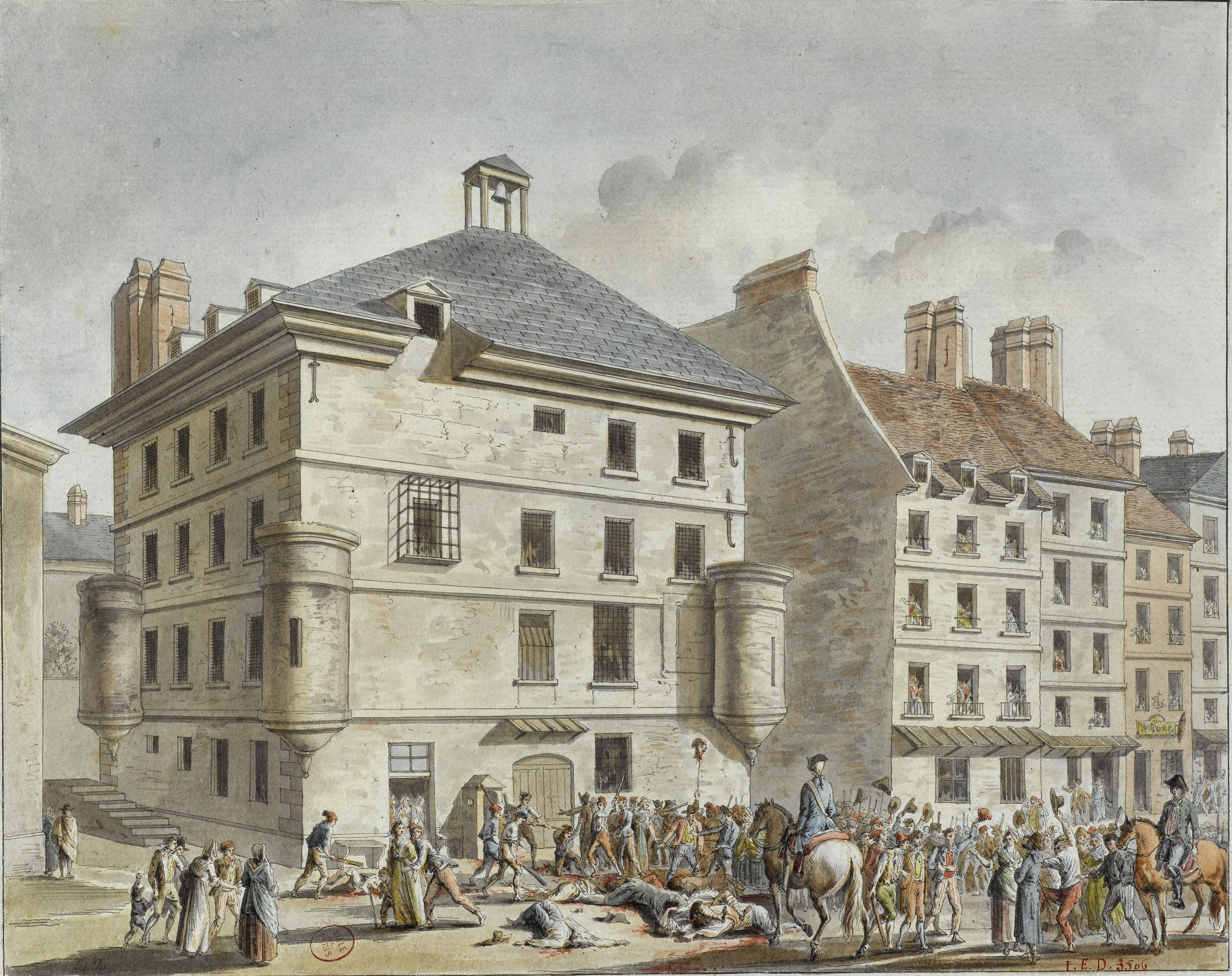
The killing of priests and other prisoners at the Abbey prison (2–7 September 1792)

In September 1792, during the French Revolution, a group of about one hundred priests, who refused to sign a declaration of loyalty to the new Revolutionary government, were being held in the Abbey prison, along with aristocrats who had been arrested by the Jacobins, and Swiss Guards who had survived an earlier massacre. In September 1792, news arrived in Paris that a Prussian army was marching toward the city. On September 2 The Revolutionary leader Georges Danton gave a speech to his assembled followers on the Champ de Mars, declaring "We ask that anyone refusing to give personal service or to furnish arms shall be punished with death."

Danton's followers moved immediately to the prison of the Abbey to carry out Danton's proposal. Between September 2 and September 6, the prisoners were rapidly tried; they were asked why they had been arrested, and then quickly sentenced. Those sentenced to death included twenty-two priests, a number of Swiss guards who had survived an earlier massacre at the Tuileries Palace, as well as a number of women, including the Princesse de Lamballe. The prisoners sentenced to death were taken outside one by one, where they were killed by a crowd armed with swords, pikes and axes. Of the Swiss Guard prisoners 135 were killed, 27 were transferred, 86 were set free, and 22 had uncertain fates.

During the rest of the Revolutionary period, The abbey and the church were closed, and the buildings were used for storage and manufacturing gunpowder and arms. Part of the church was turned into a workshop for refining niter, an ingredient of gunpowder. It exploded accidentally, causing serious damage to the church and other abbey buildings.

With the end of the Revolution, The Catholic Church was officially re-established on 31 May 1795, and the ruined building again became a church. In 1802 The Council of Civil Buildings debated whether to simply sell and then demolish the building, which was badly damaged by the saltpetre leaking down into the foundations. Finally, due to the building's long history, they decided to preserve the building, though they declared that the architecture "offers nothing particularly interesting regarding art." The only buildings remaining intact were the church and the palace of the Bishops, next to it. These were formally returned to the church in on 29 April 1803. The Chapel of the Virgin Mary, more seriously damaged, was demolished, though some of the stained glass windows were saved. Some flamboyant arches from the Virgin Chapel can be seen today in the small park next to the church.

After the Revolution, historical excavations resumed. Alexandre Lenoir discovered two Merovingian tombs under the main altar in 1799. These were moved to the Cluny Museum. Other art works were restored to the church, while the Louvre received the marble columns of the altar in 1704. The paintings which had been moved to Versailles, were restored to the church. Other works recovered included the marble statue of the Virgin given to the Louvre by Queen Jeanne d'Evreux.

The saltpetre stored in the church during the Revolution had badly damaged the pilings on the north side, and the nave itself could not be used. The Council of Buildings considered simply demolishing the building, but the inspector-general, Mazois, insisted that the choir could be saved and the nave restored. In the summer of 1822 the upper levels of the towers on the north and south sides of the church, largely in ruins, were demolished down to the roof line, leaving the church with a single tower. The chapels of the disambulatory and the six flying buttresses of the apse were rebuilt in 1823.

=== Restoration and redecoration ===
By 1824, the restoring group had assembled marble columns and stained glass windows from other Paris buildings destroyed during the Revolution buildings, which had been fortunately preserved in the Museum of French Monuments. In 1843, the artist Hippolyte Flandrin began the largest project of all, the redecoration of the nave. This was not a restoration, but a re-imagination of a medieval church. For this purpose he employed colourful frescoes illustrating scenes of the Old Testament which announced the coming life of Christ. His work was carried out between 1856 and 1861. The murals themselves were surrounded by very elaborate painted settings, using gold stars against azure backgrounds and painted architecture. During the same period, the architect Baltard commissioned sculptors to make new capitals for the columns of the arcades in the nave, choir and apse, based on the medieval originals stored in the Cluny Museum. The new capitals and column themselves were also brightly coloured. The paintings and decoration dominated the architecture.

Baltard extended the decoration to include the furnishings; he designed new choir stalls, while Lassus designed a new carved wooden enclosure for the apse. The original stained glass windows had been destroyed during the Revolution. The glass artist Gérente designed new stained glass windows for the chevet based on the drawings of Flandrin.

From 1848 to 1853, Baltard restored the top level of the western tower, opening up the bays, and remaking the columns and other architectural features, but leaving nothing of the original 12th century work.

From 2017 to 2020. the City of Paris and the church carried out a major restoration of the interior of the building, particularly the 19th century murals in the nave, whose original colours had faded. This was funded jointly by the French state and donors from the Parish. Between 2021 and 2022, a second phase is underway to restore the paintings in the disambulatory and the chapels at the east end of the church.

=== Ownership ===
Like Notre Dame de Paris and all the other churches of Paris built before 1905, the building of Saint-Germain-de-Pres is owned by the French State, with exclusive usage granted to the Catholic Church.

== Exterior ==
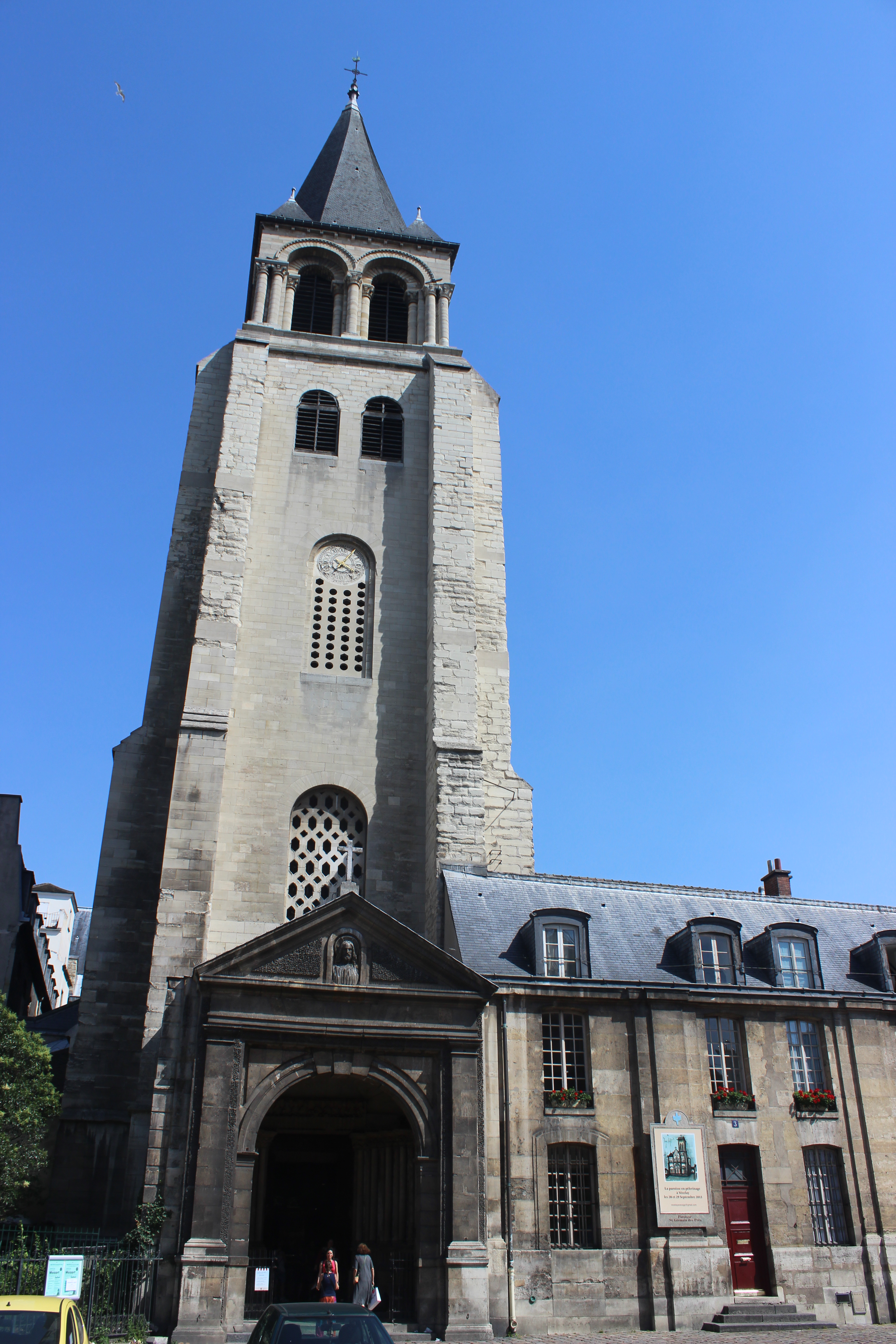
The bell tower (10th century)

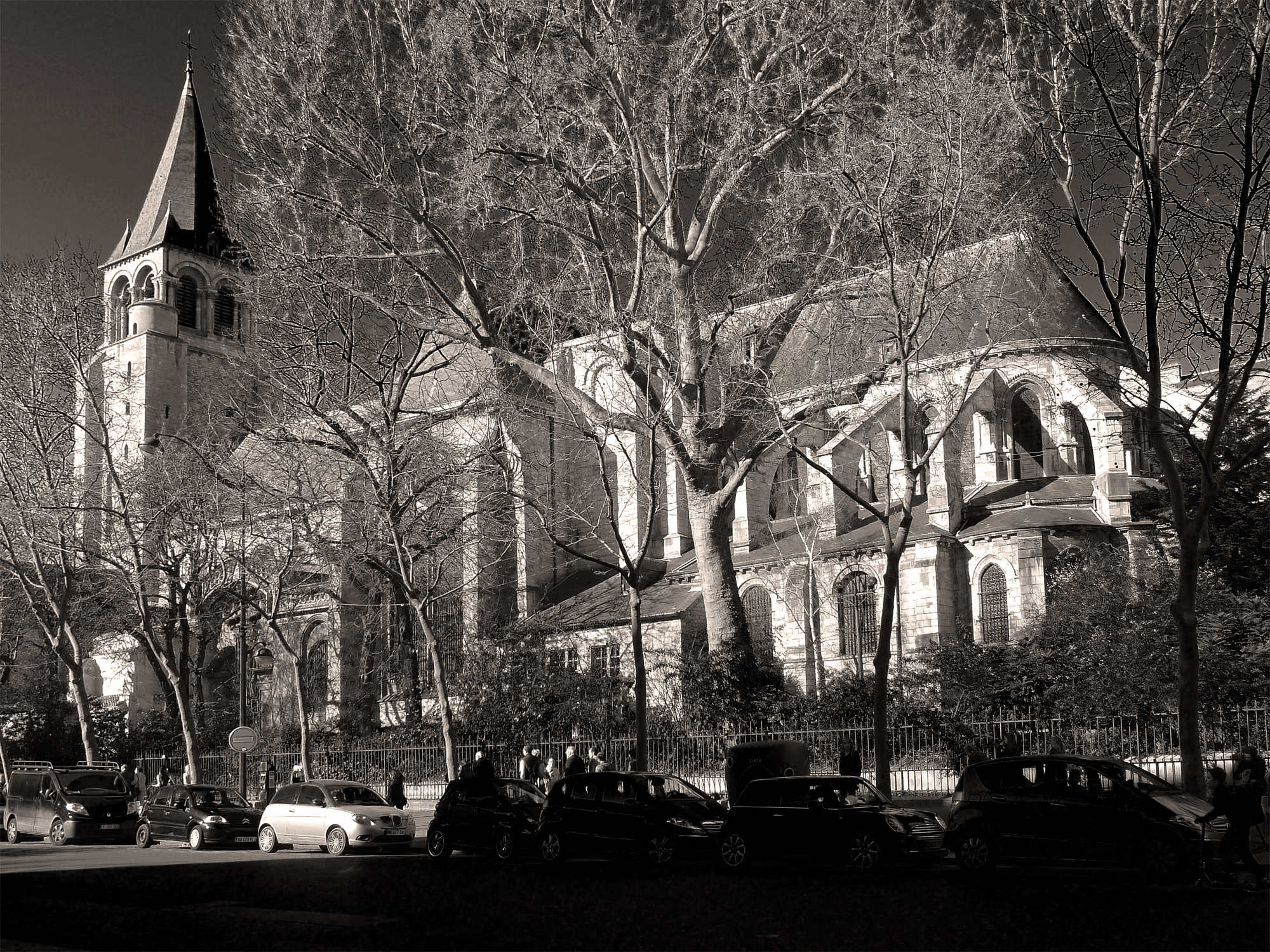
View of the full church from the southeast

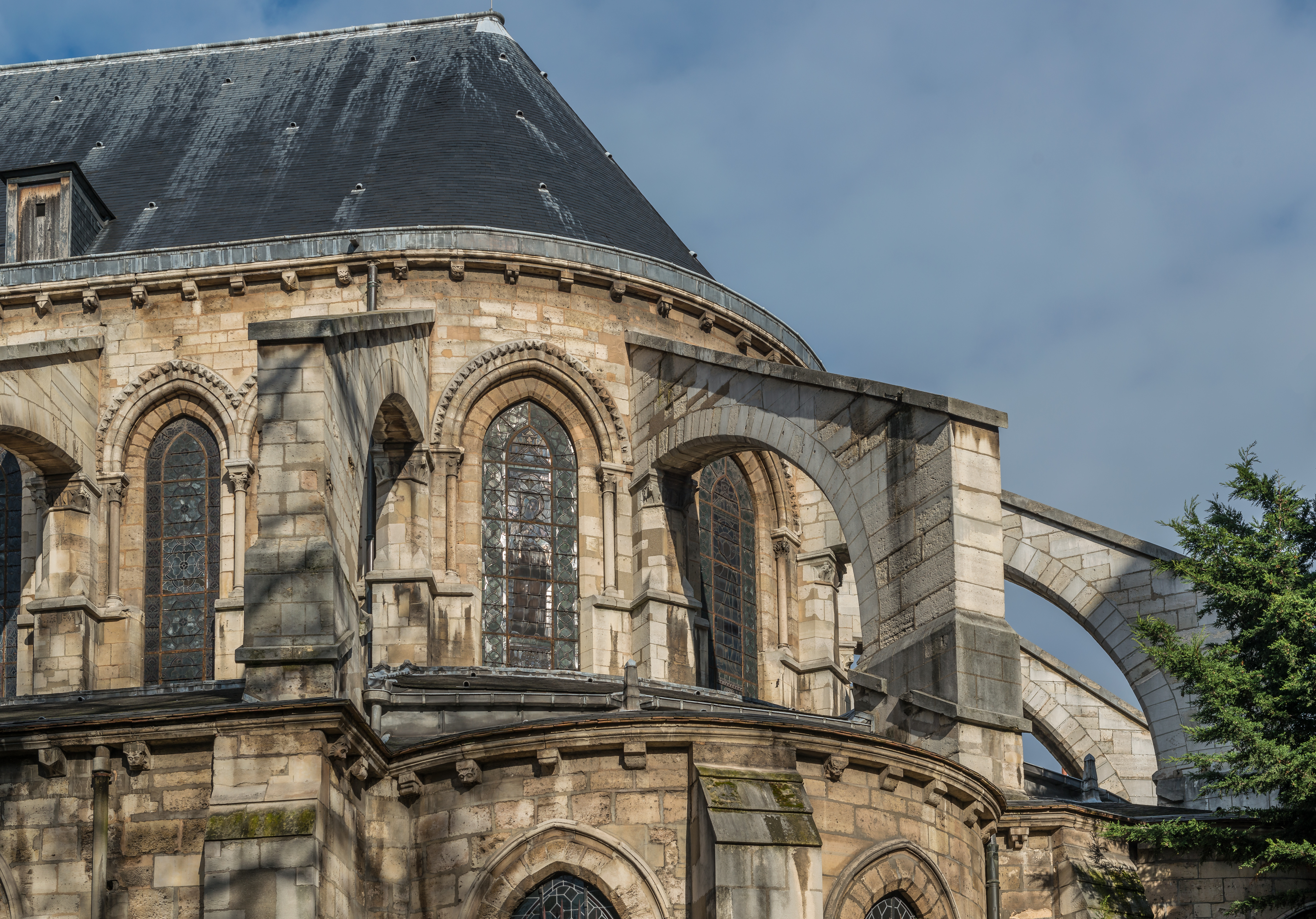
The apse with flying buttresses, seen from the south

At the time of the French Revolution the Church had three bell towers; the present tower of the church and its porch is the only one that remains. It was built beginning in 990, making it one of the oldest bell towers in France. Its square form, with reinforcements at the corners, is in the style of a medieval fortress. The upper level of the tower was rebuilt in a Neo-Gothic style in the 19th century.

The west porch and portico of the church dates to the 17th century, and has little decoration. Within it are some vestiges of the 12th-century entrance of the church, including some columns with sculpture, a sculpture in relief of the Last Supper on the tympanum, and capitals on the columns decorated with sculpted harpies, half-woman, half-bird figures.

On the south side of the church, along Boulevard Saint-Germain, the walls and vaults are supported by a row of flying buttresses from the end of the 12th century, the first in the Ile-de-France region.

== Interior ==
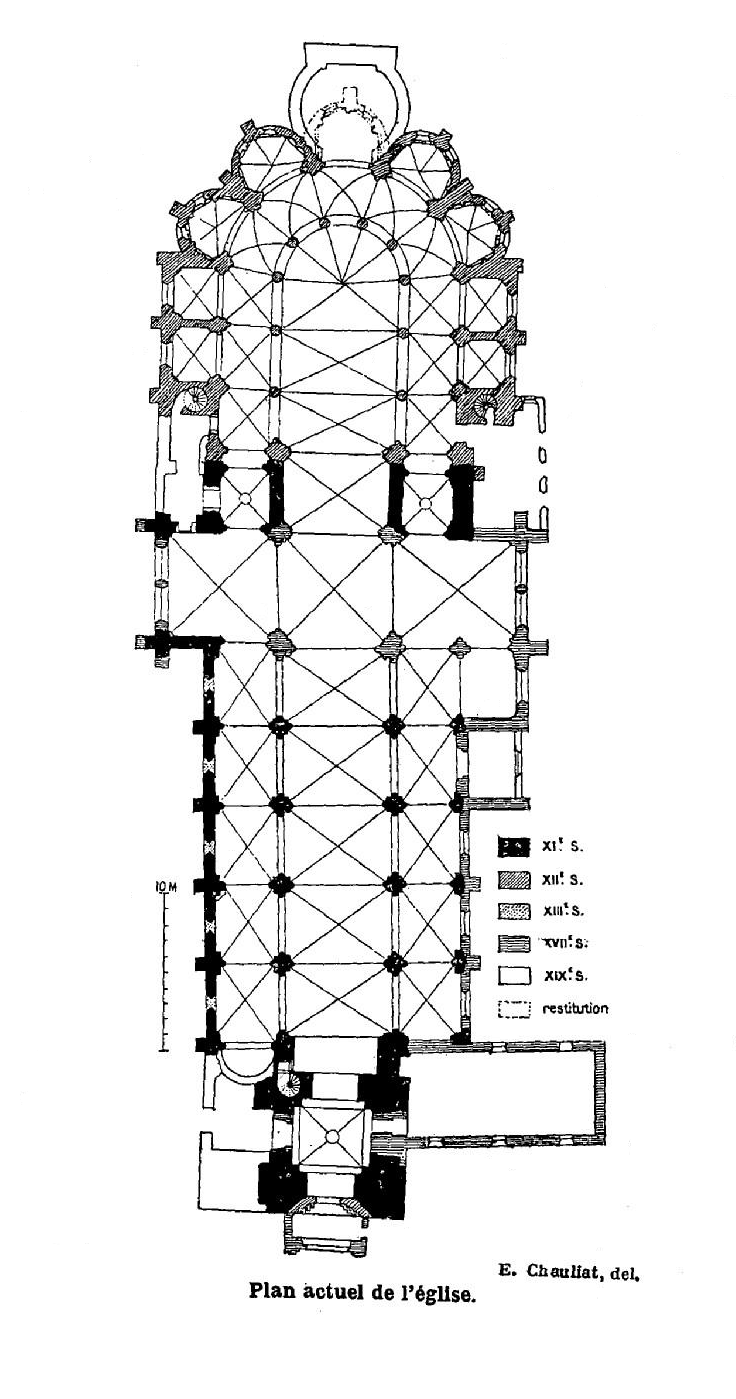
Plan of the church

The interior of the church had some peculiar features, due to the evolution of styles over the centuries. The oldest parts of the church, the Romanesque bell tower and portal at the west end, were slightly out of alignment with the nave and the rest of the church. The nave was Romanesque on its lower levels, with rounded arches and windows and engaged pillars and columns, but Gothic at the top level, with four-part rib vaults installed in the middle of the 17th century. The interior decoration is predominantly baroque, with illusions of movement in both the architecture and decoration. The nave is bordered with small chapels, and concludes with the choir, where the clergy worshipped, and where the altar is located. Unlike earlier churches, where the majority of colour was provided by the stained glass windows, the colour in Saint-Germaine comes from the frescoes that cover the walls and arches, and the abundance of sculpture, painting and other decoration.

=== The West Portal ===
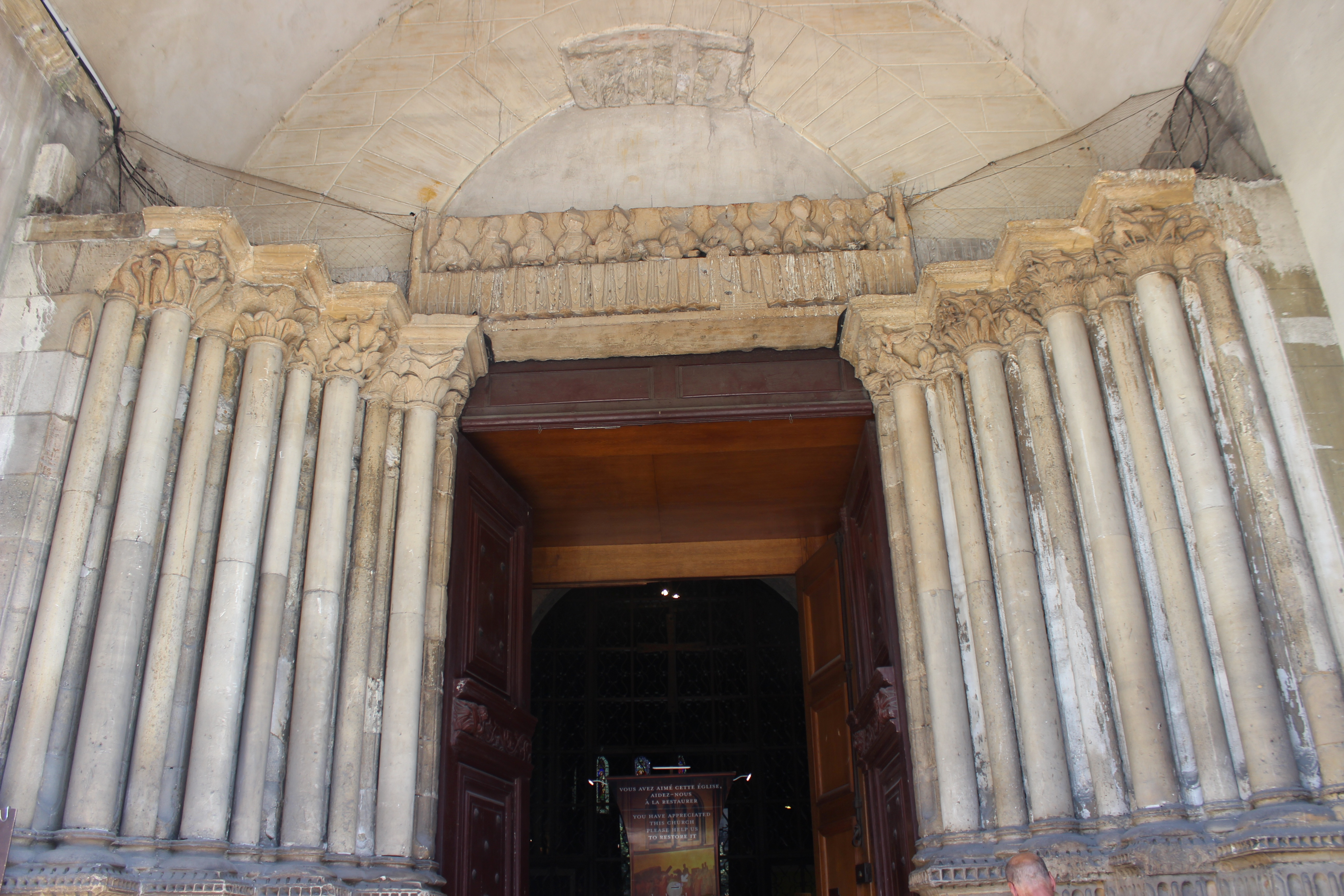
The West Portal, beneath a sculpture of the Last Supper (12th c.)

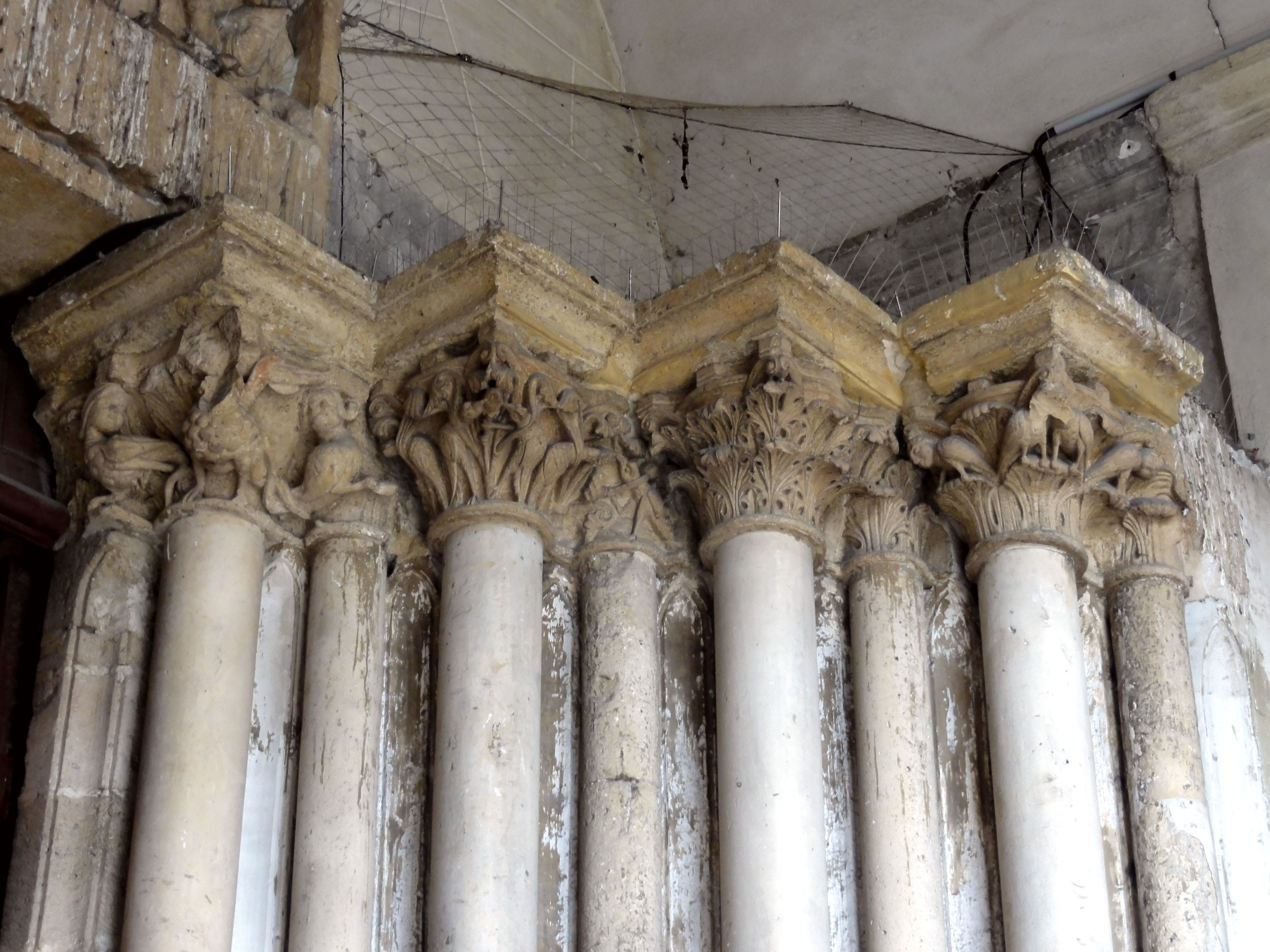
Columns in the west portal

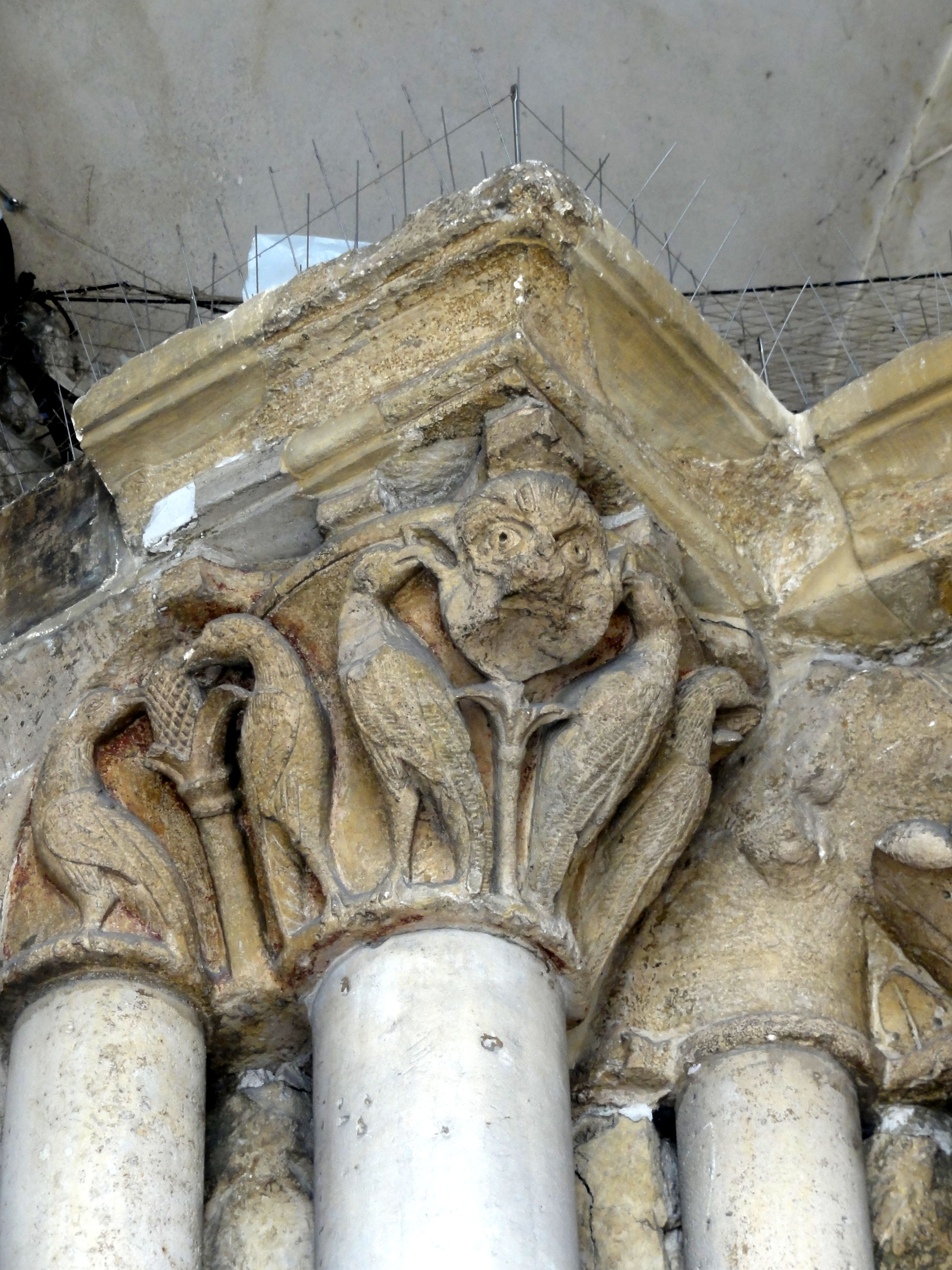
Column capitals with sculpted harpies

The Gothic west portal, sheltered within a more recent porch, dates to the 12th century. Over the doorway is a sculpture of the Last Supper; the faces of the Apostles were smashed with hammers during the French Revolution. This is flanked by two sets of columns whose capitals depict harpies. half-woman, half-bird creatures who symbolised storm winds.

=== The Nave ===
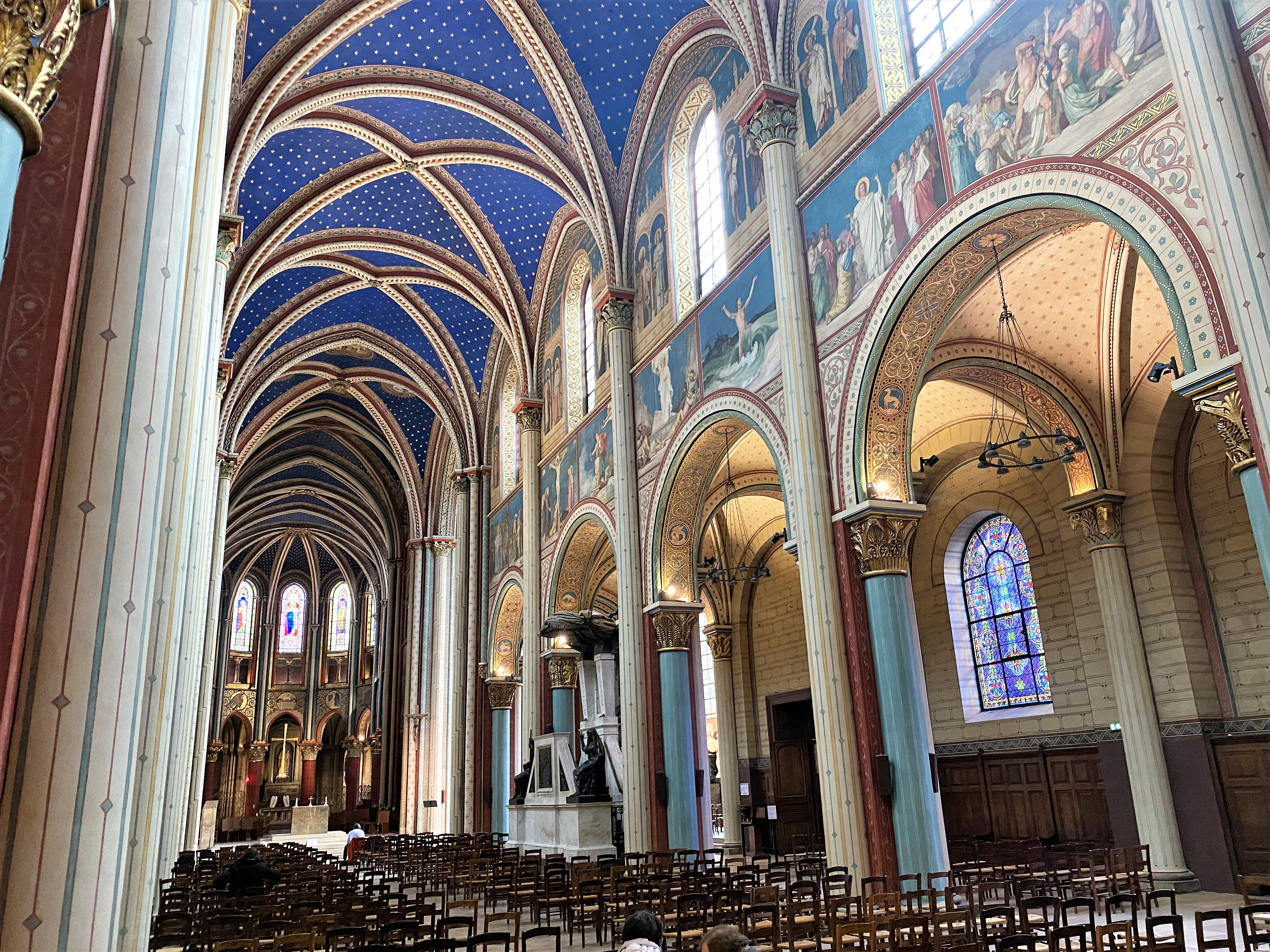
The Nave, after restoration, looking toward the altar

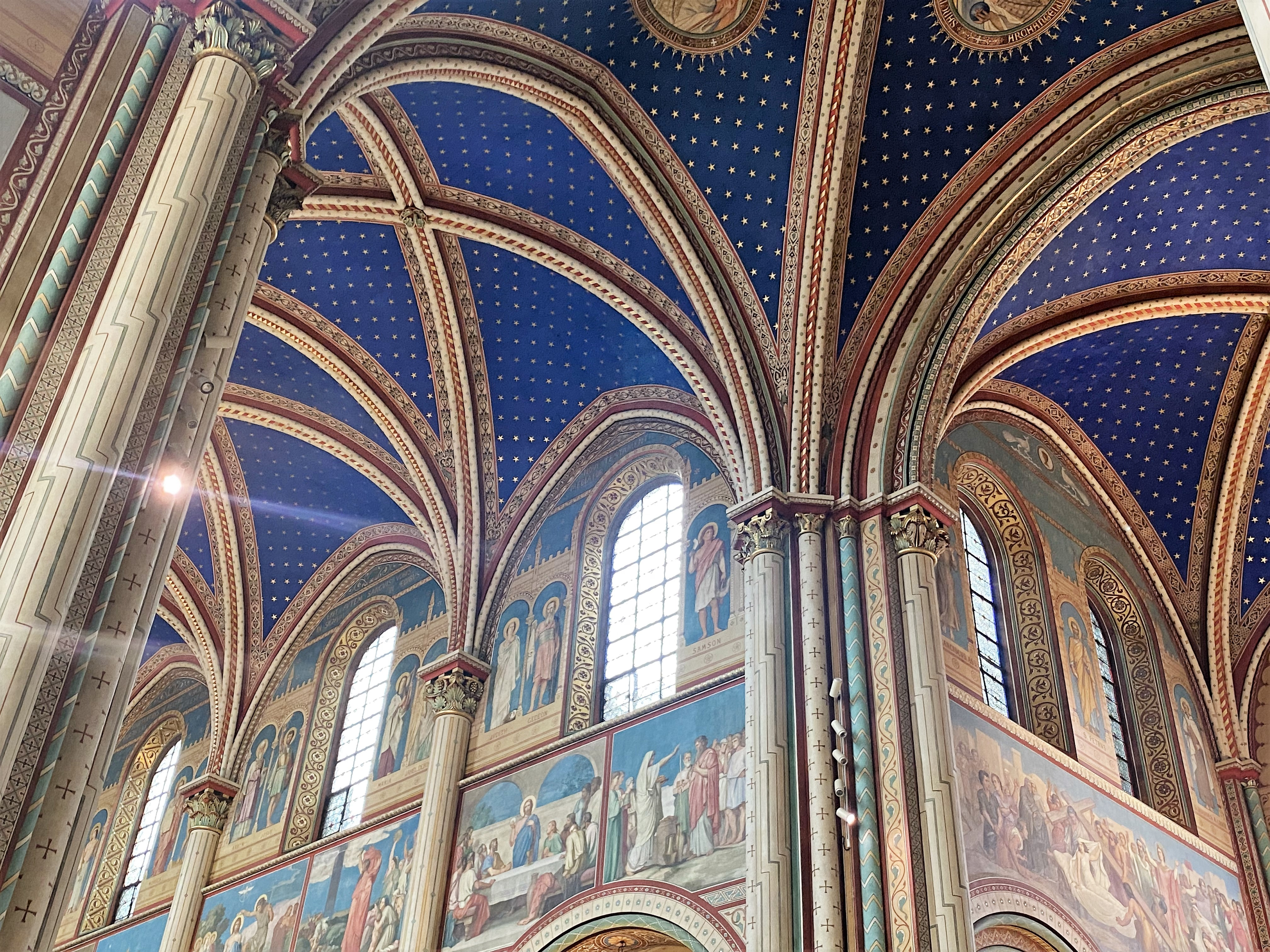
Vaults of the Nave

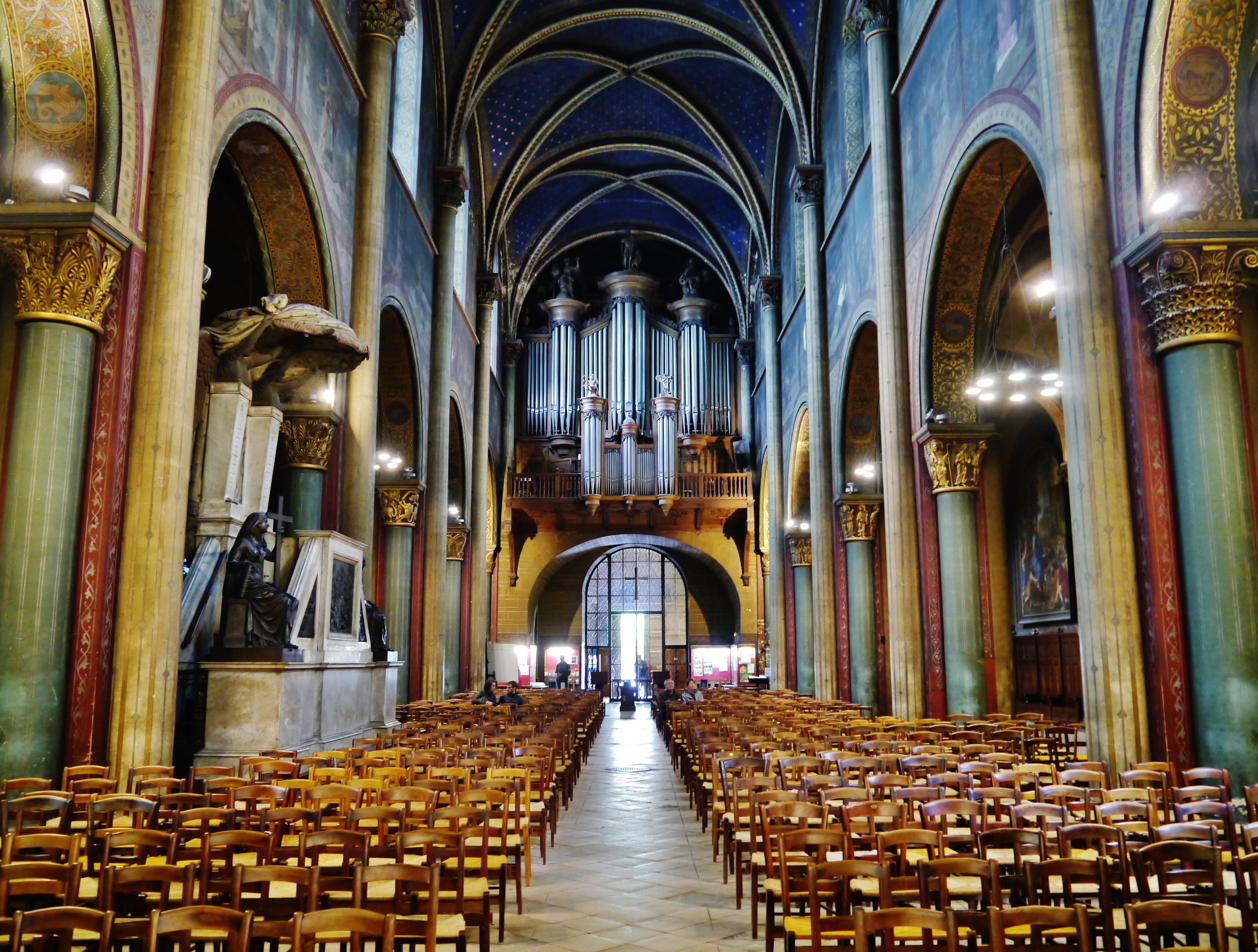
The nave facing west toward the organ

The church was begun in Romanesque period and has been continuously modified, making it a virtual catalog of French religious architectural styles, from the Romanesque to the Gothic, neoclassical and Gothic revival. Some of the elements of the original, such as the capitals of the columns in the arcades of the nave, were in poor condition and have been moved to the Cluny Museum of the Middle Ages. They have been replaced by very colorful copies, which along with the restored murals, try to recapture the spirit of the original church.

During the 19th century restoration of the church, the neoclassical artist Hippolyte Flandrin was selected to design the overall decor. He directed a team of artists, who painted the colourful murals and elaborate decorative works that harmonise with the large paintings in the chapels along the nave and choir.

Beginning in 2020, a major restoration and renovation of the murals in the nave began, and was largely completed by 2022. It will be followed by renovation of the murals in the choir.

=== The Choir ===
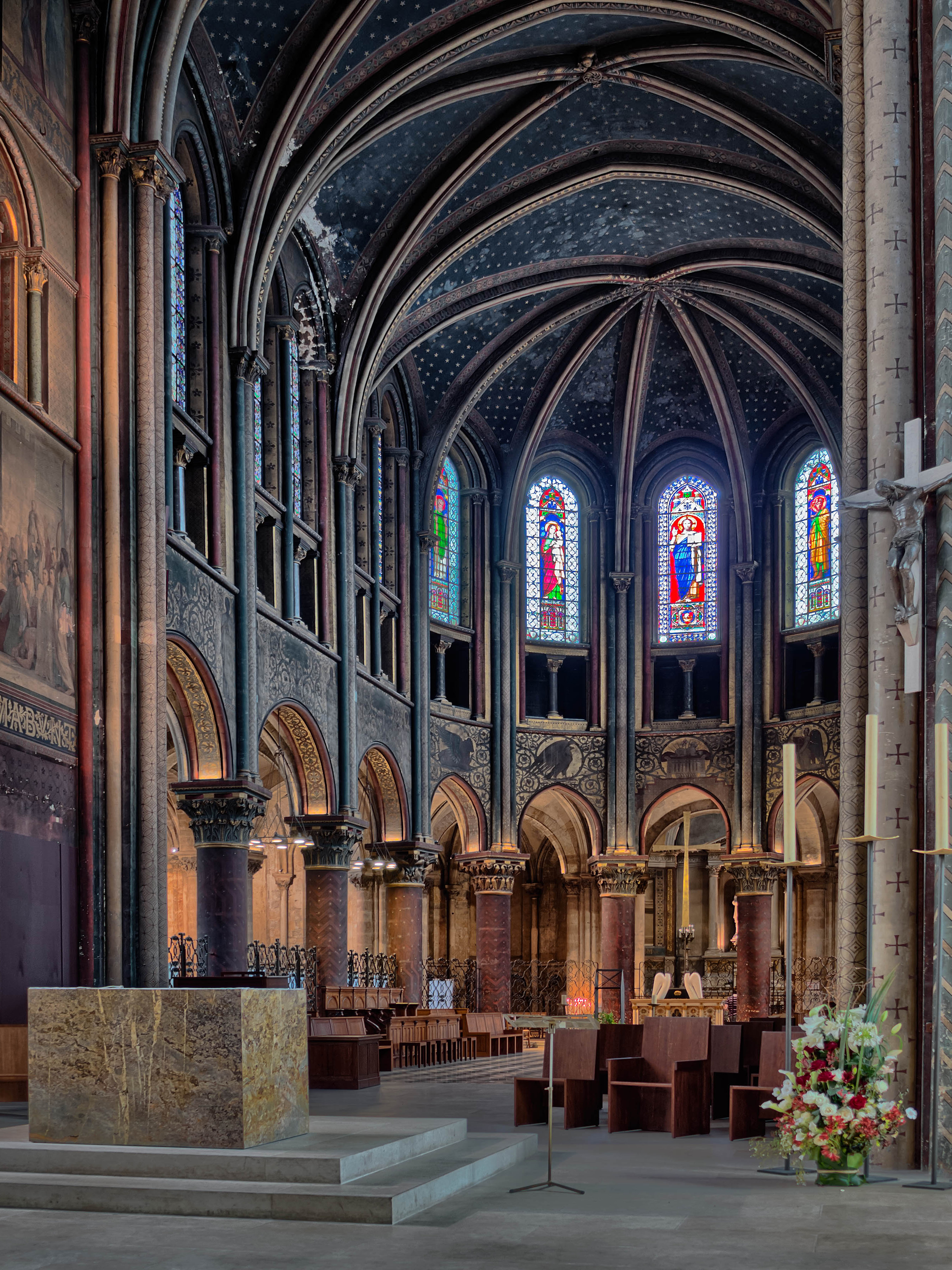
The Choir

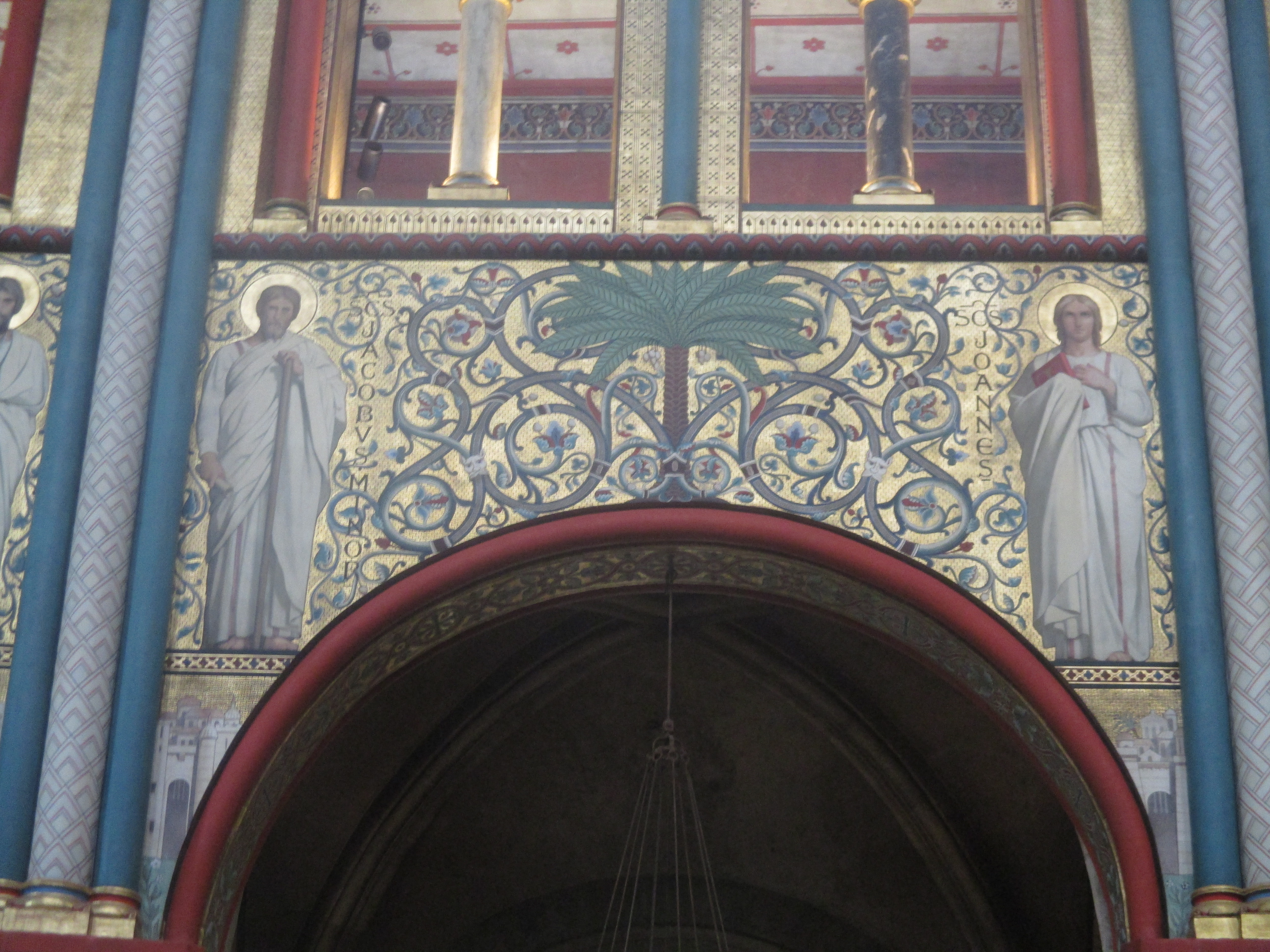
Fresco in the choir

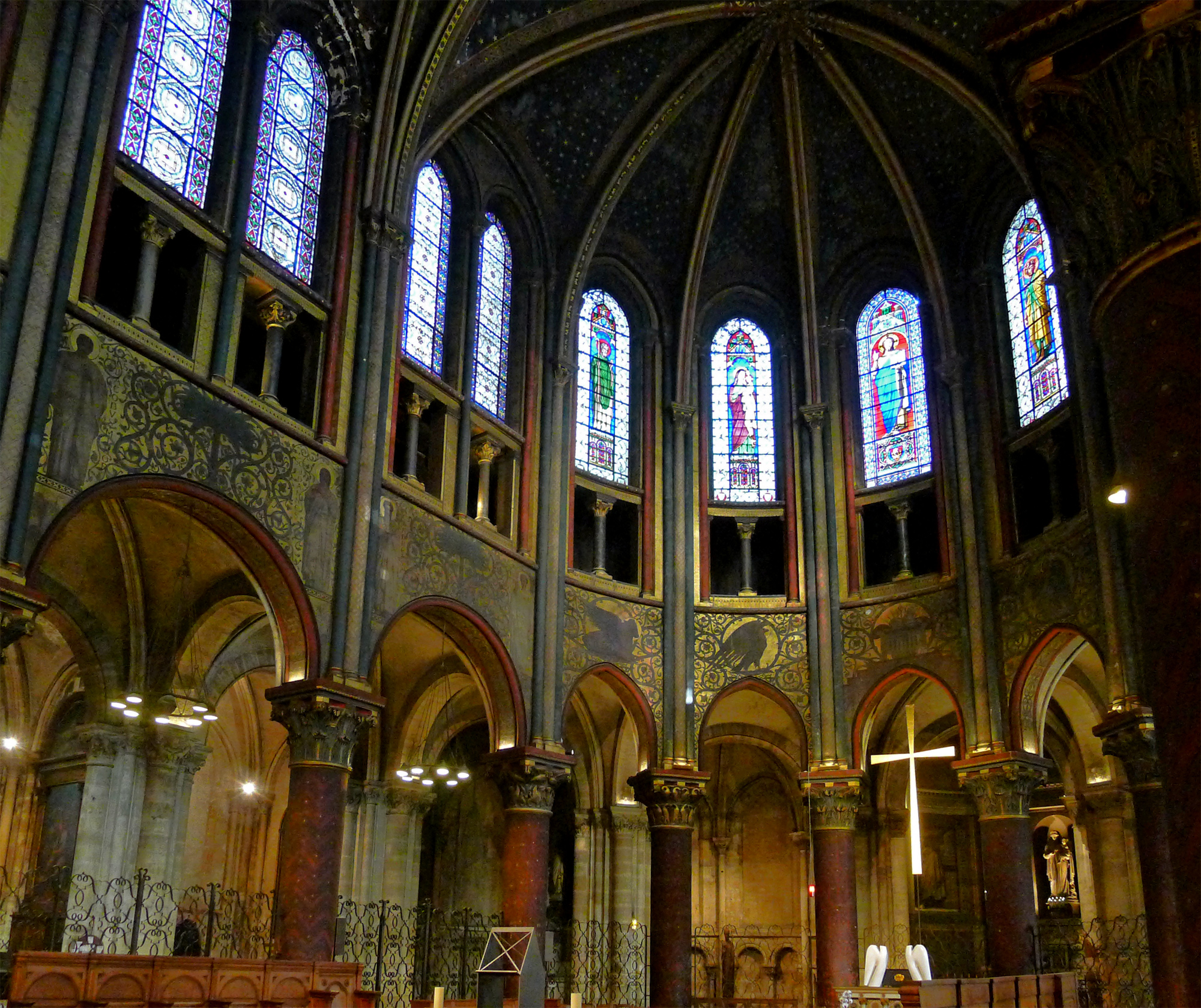
North side of the choir

The Choir of the church, the area where the clergy worships, was created in the mid-12th century. Its elevation is modeled after Sens Cathedral, the first entirely Gothic cathedral in France. The vaults have four-part Gothic rib vaults, The choir is lined with the columns of the arcades, whose capitals are decorated with sculpted mythical figures; griffins, the sphinx and acanthus leaves, drawing upon the symbols of earlier myths and religions. The lower aisle on the right side displays a marble statue of the Virgin Mary from the 14th century; originally in Notre-Dame Cathedral, it was moved to Saint-Germain in 1802, and attracts visitors by the tender and expressive faces and pose of the Virgin and child.

The renovation of the colourful murals in the choir was set to begin in 2022, following the renovation of the murals in the nave.

=== Disambulatory and chapels ===
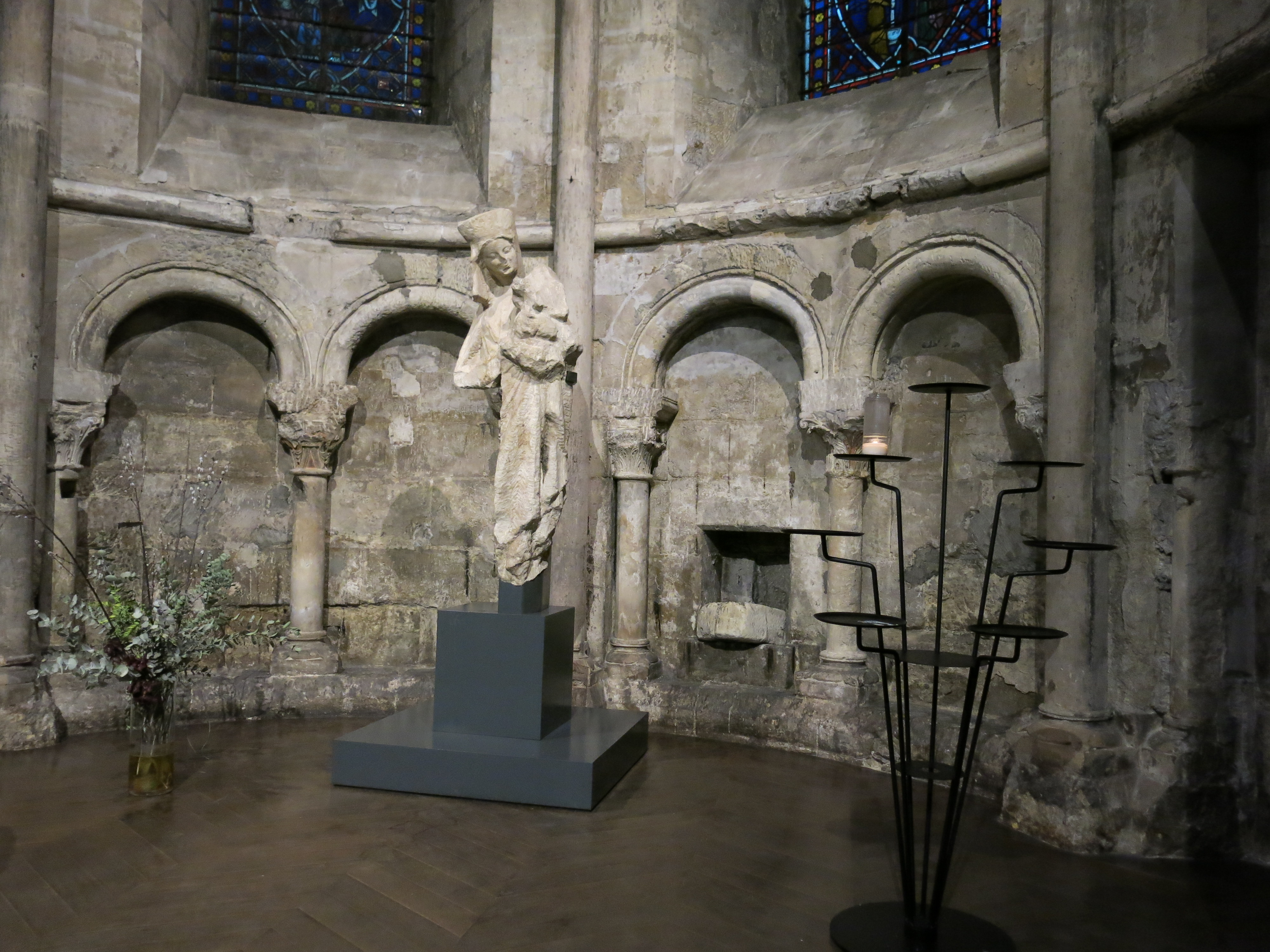
A chapel in the disambulatory

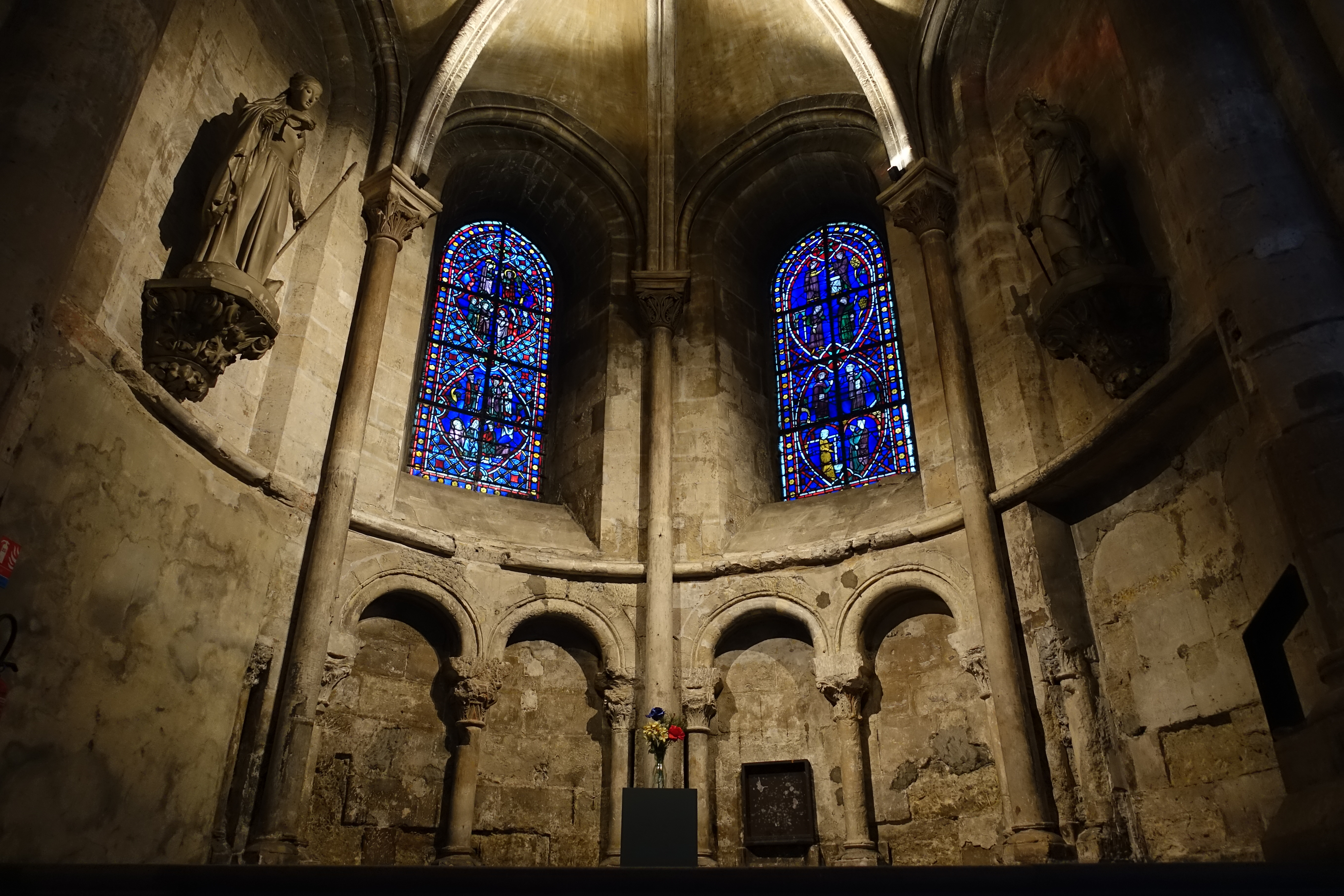
Arcades of the chapel of the disambulatory

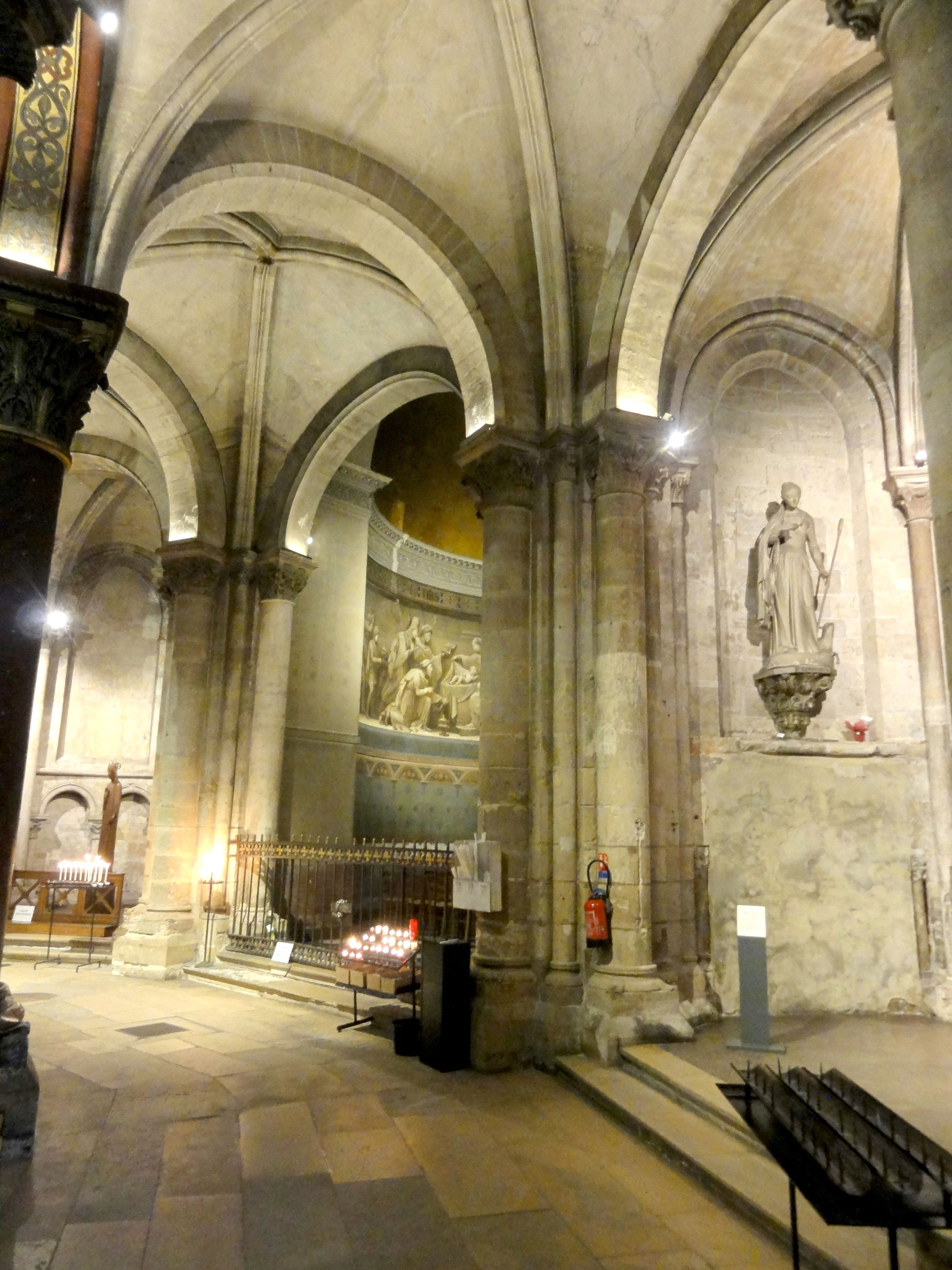
Disambulatory chapels, looking east

The disambulatory, the semicircular passage around the east end of the church, was constructed in the 12th century. It contains a series of small chapels decorated with Romanesque arcades of slender columns whose capitals feature the heads of angels and classical sirens. It also displays an array of early sculptures and paintings of the 17th century.

=== Chapel of Saint Symphorien ===
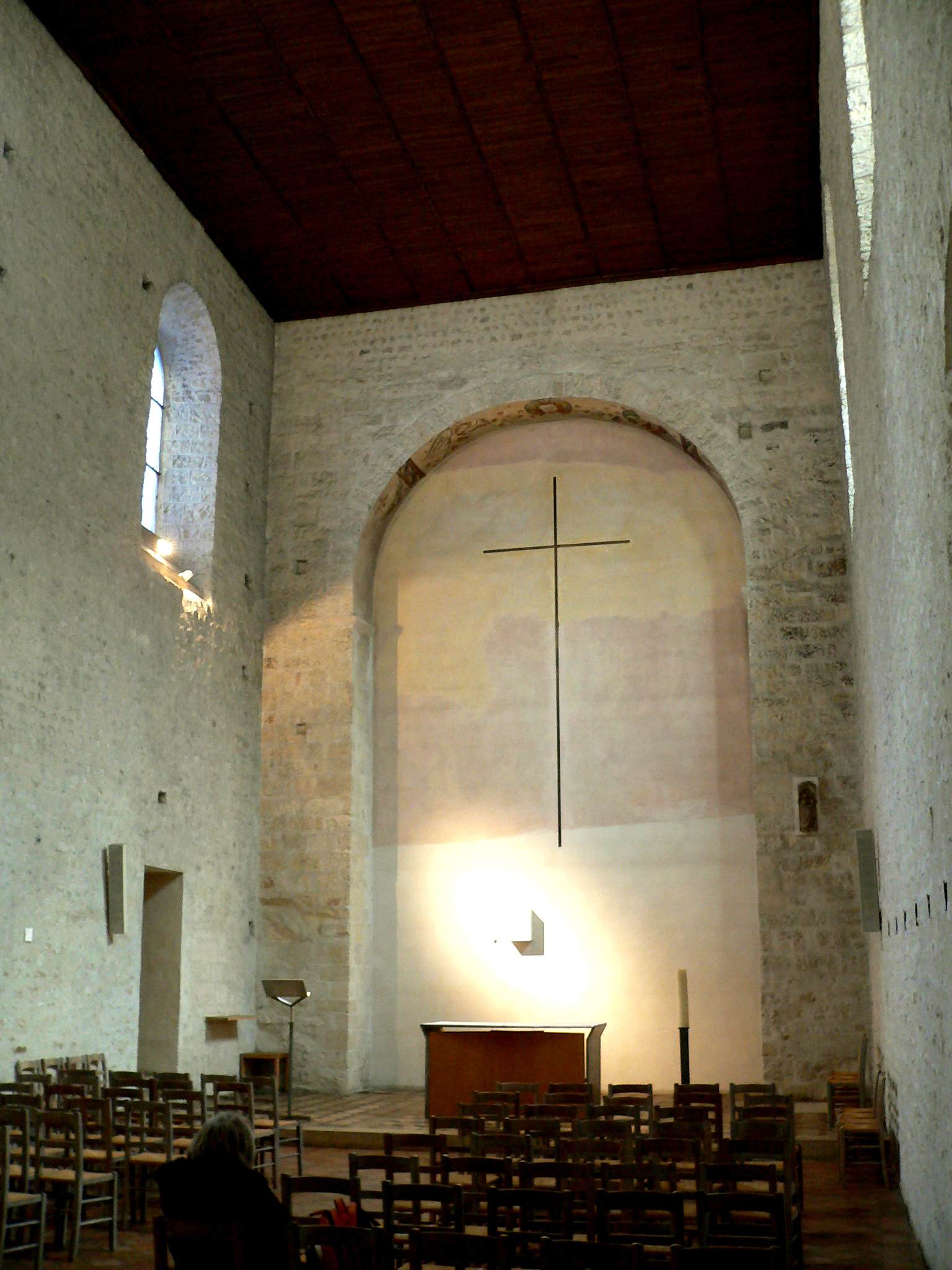
The Chapel of Saint Symphorien (end of 10th century)

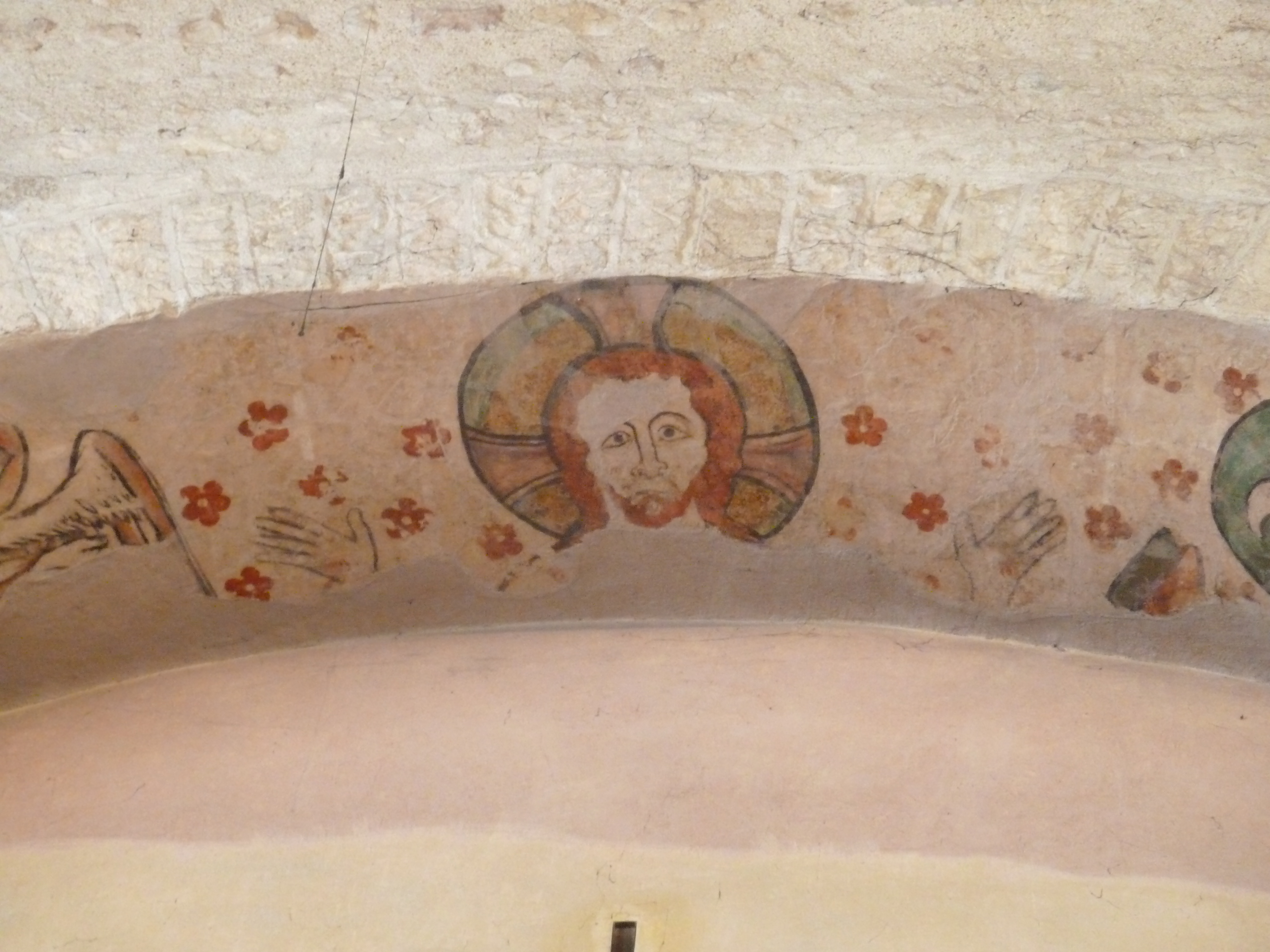
Trace of a fresco of Christ at the top of the arch

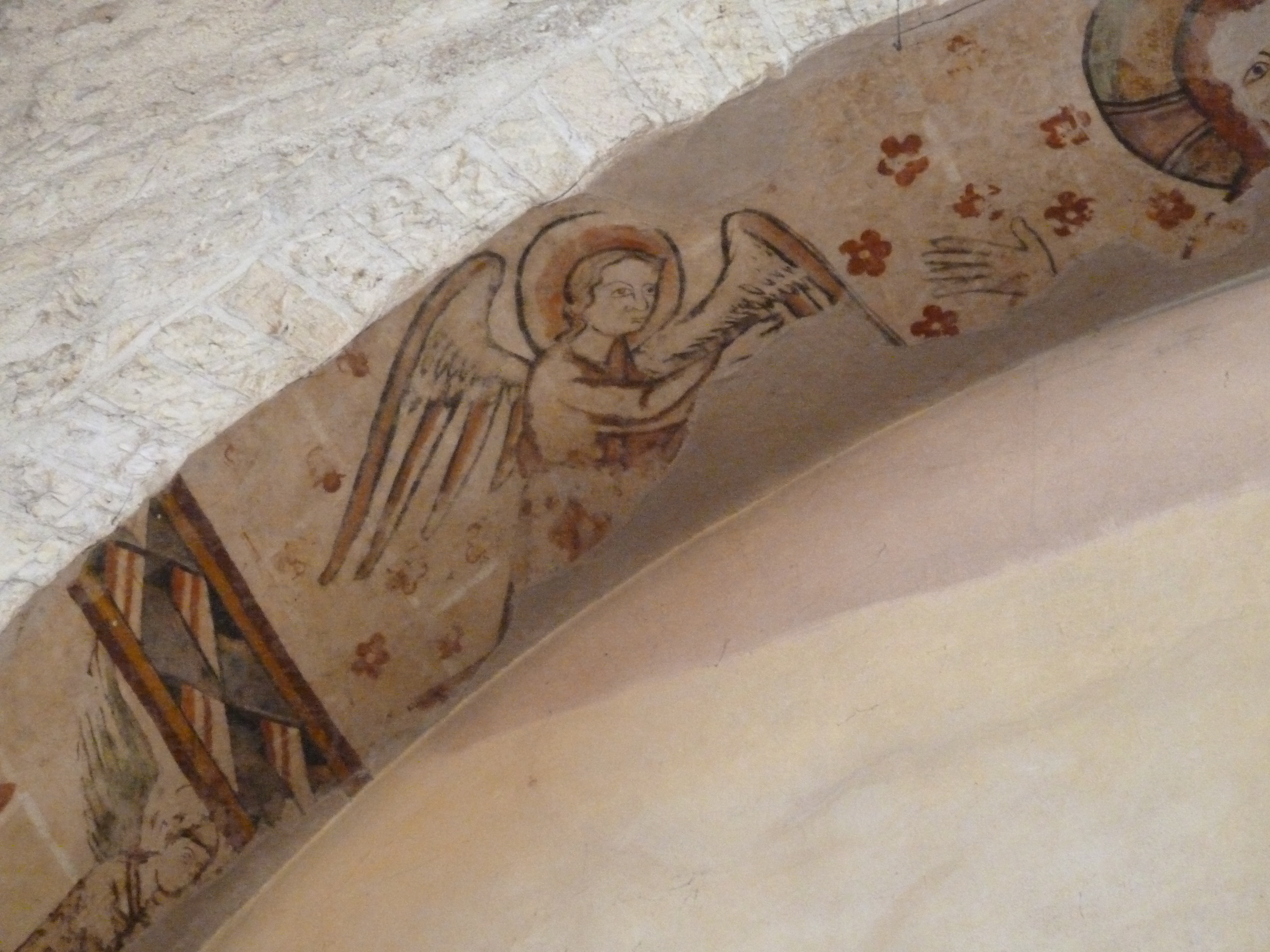
Fresco of an angel on the arch

The Chapel of Saint Symphorien, located just to the right inside the entrance of the church, is one of the oldest places in the church. It was constructed in about 1020, at the same time as the bell tower. to contain the sarcophagus of Saint Germain, who died in 576. His tomb was formerly located in the earlier church on the site, which had been destroyed during the Viking invasions. It was located at the edge of the Abbey so that it would be accessible for lay persons who came on pilgrimages, while most of the Abbey was accessible only to the monks.

In 1690, the head of the monastery decided to redecorate the room, covering the walls with wood palling. These were removed in the 1970s, revealing the original walls and frescoes from the 11th century. The square chapel is of an extreme simplicity, with windows high up the walls giving it a large amount of light. The wall of the apse, facing south, has a simple arch. The interior face of the arch has traces of the early frescoes of Christ and Angels. painted with ochre, brown, red and yellow.

== Art and Decoration ==
=== Painting and sculpture ===
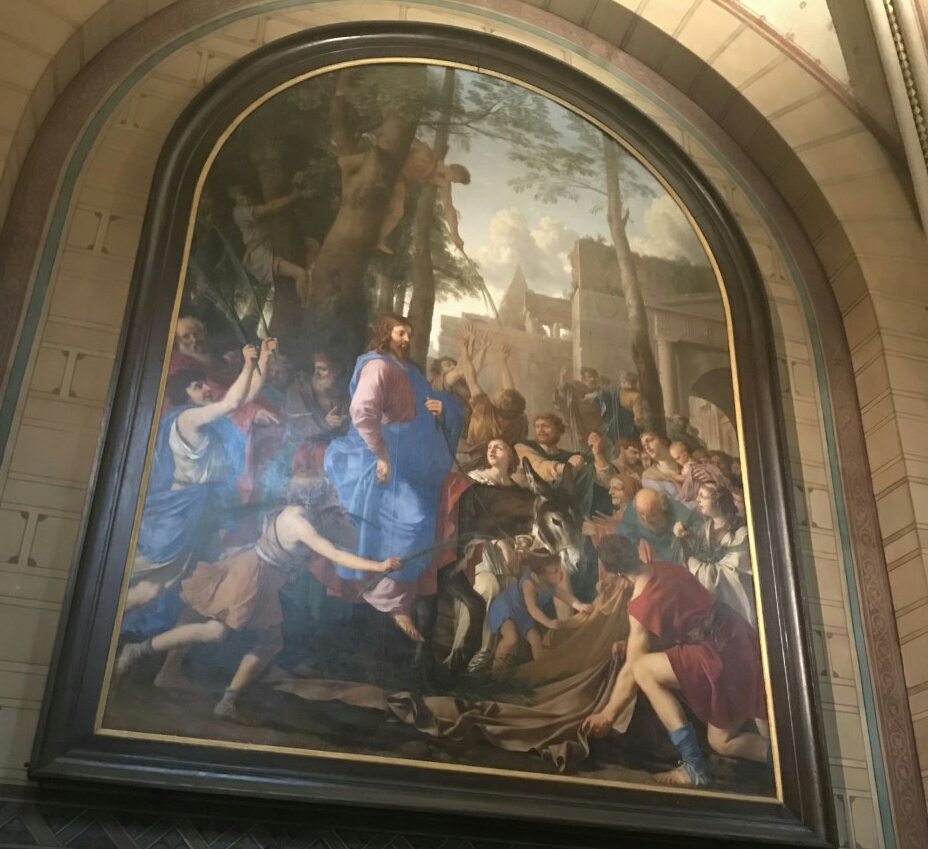
"Entry of Christ into Jerusalem" by Laurent de La Hyre (1606-1656)

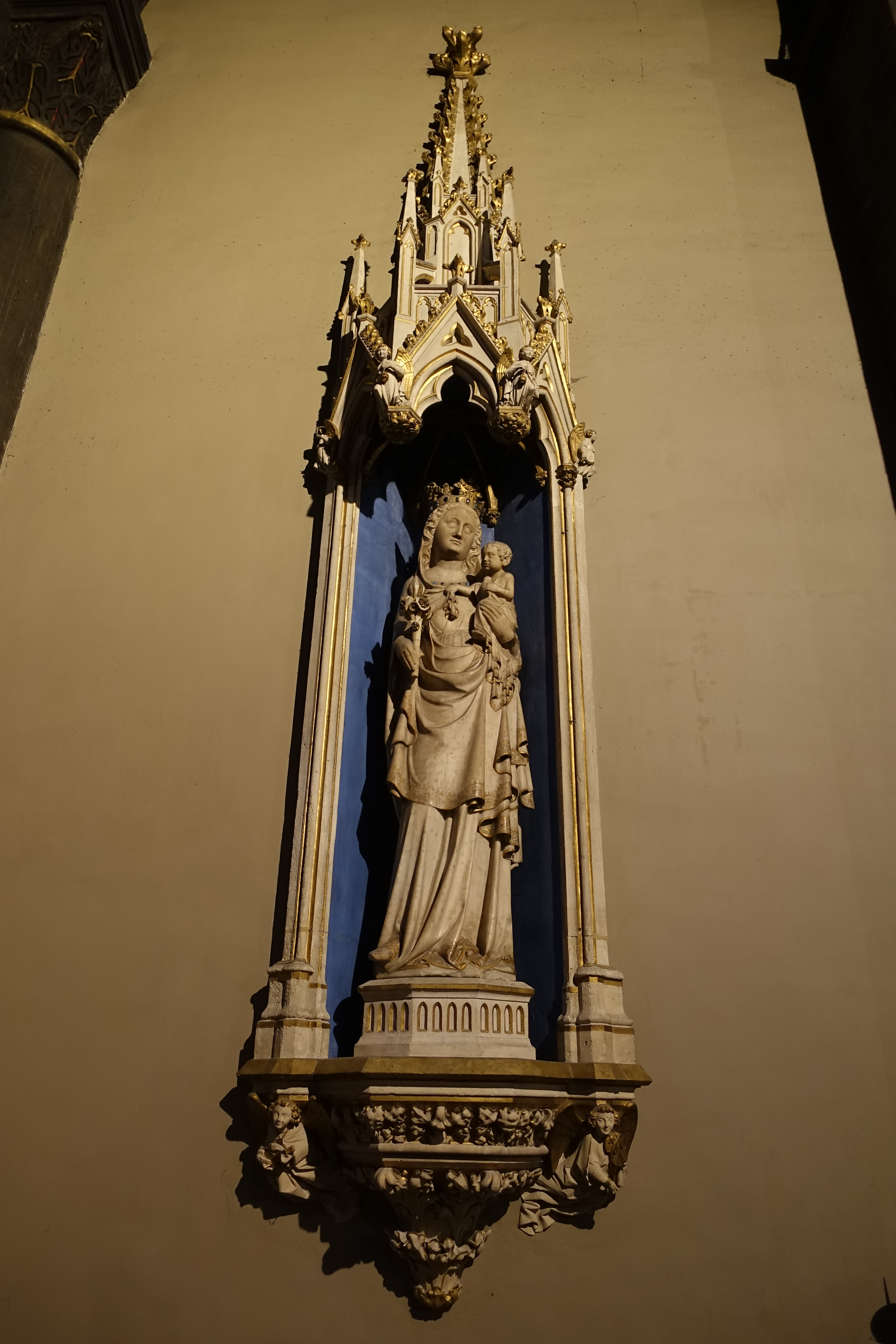
"Our Lady of Consolation" (14th c.)

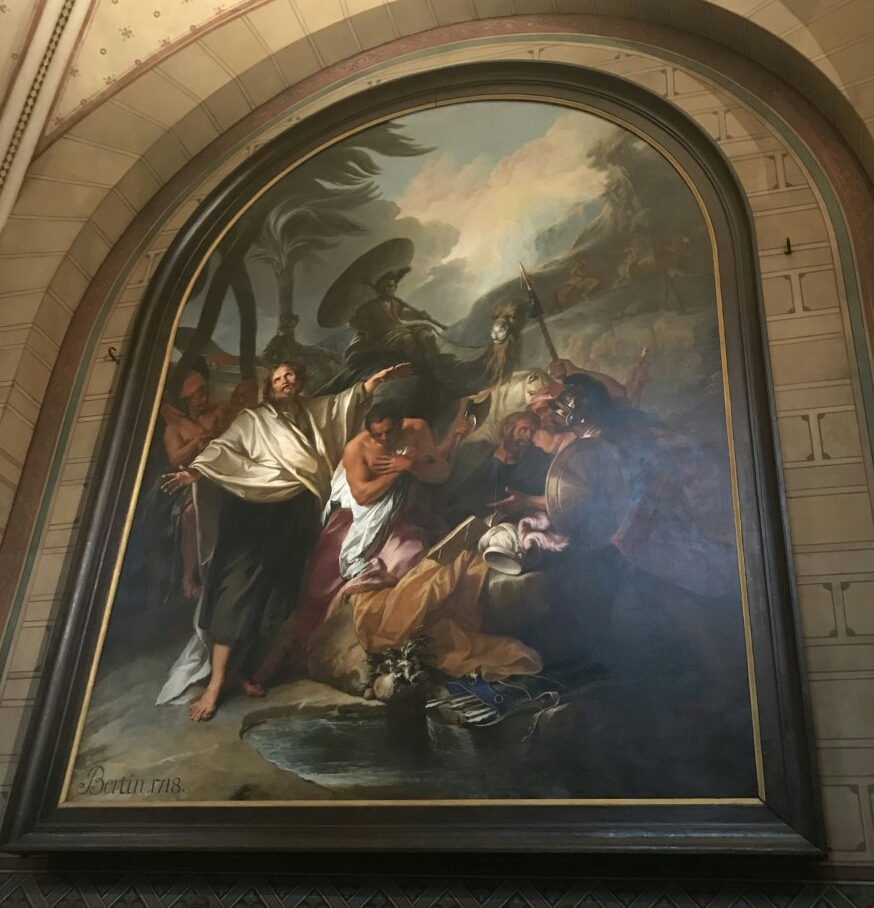
"The Baptism of the Eunuch of the Queen of Candace" by Nicolas Bertin (1668–1736)

The chapels around the disabulatory at the east end of the church display several notable works of art. These include "Entry of Christ into Jerusalem" by Laurent de La Hyre (1606–1656).

=== Paintings – the Hippolyte Flandrin cycle ===
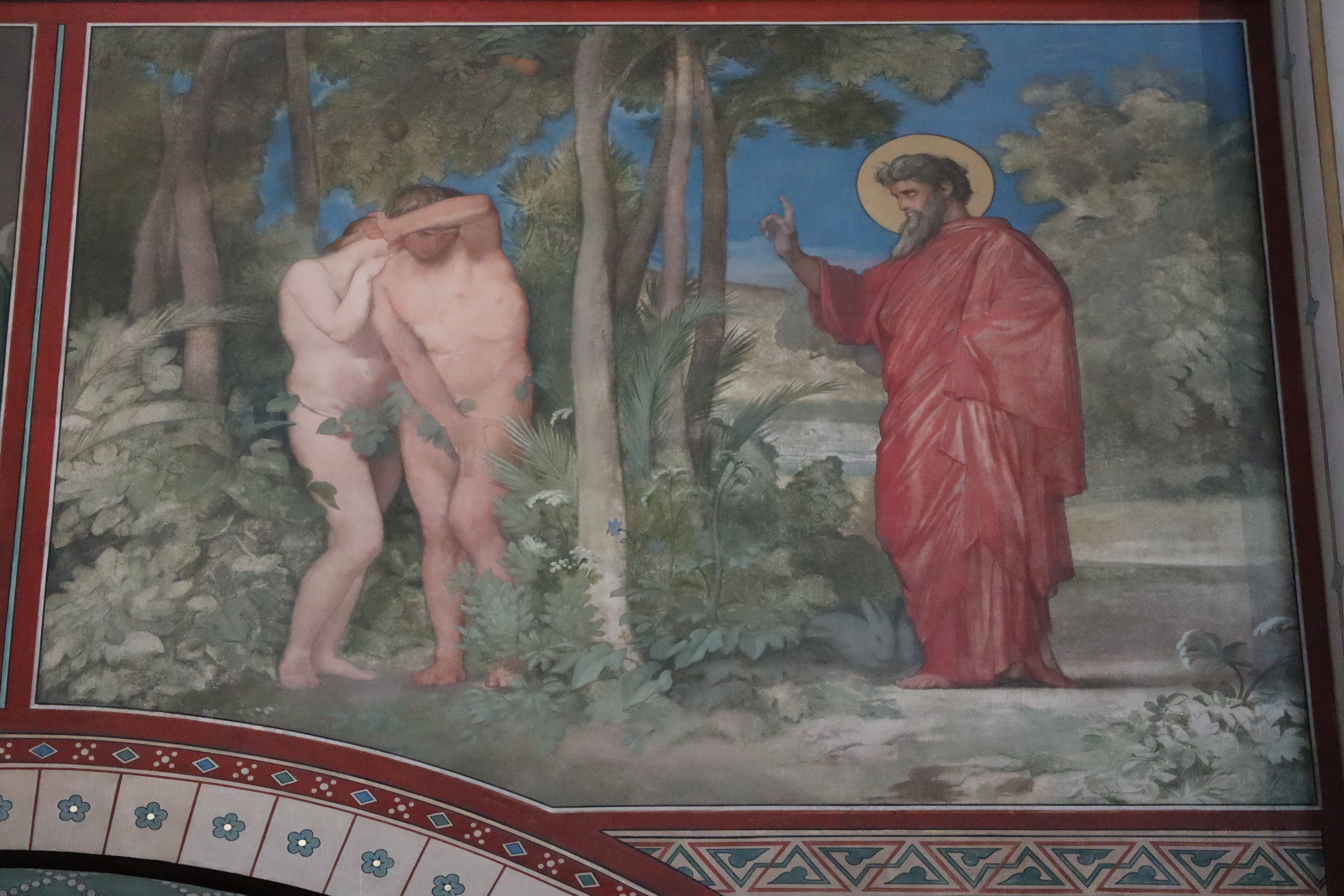
"Adam and Eve in Paradise with God the Father" (North side, second traverse)

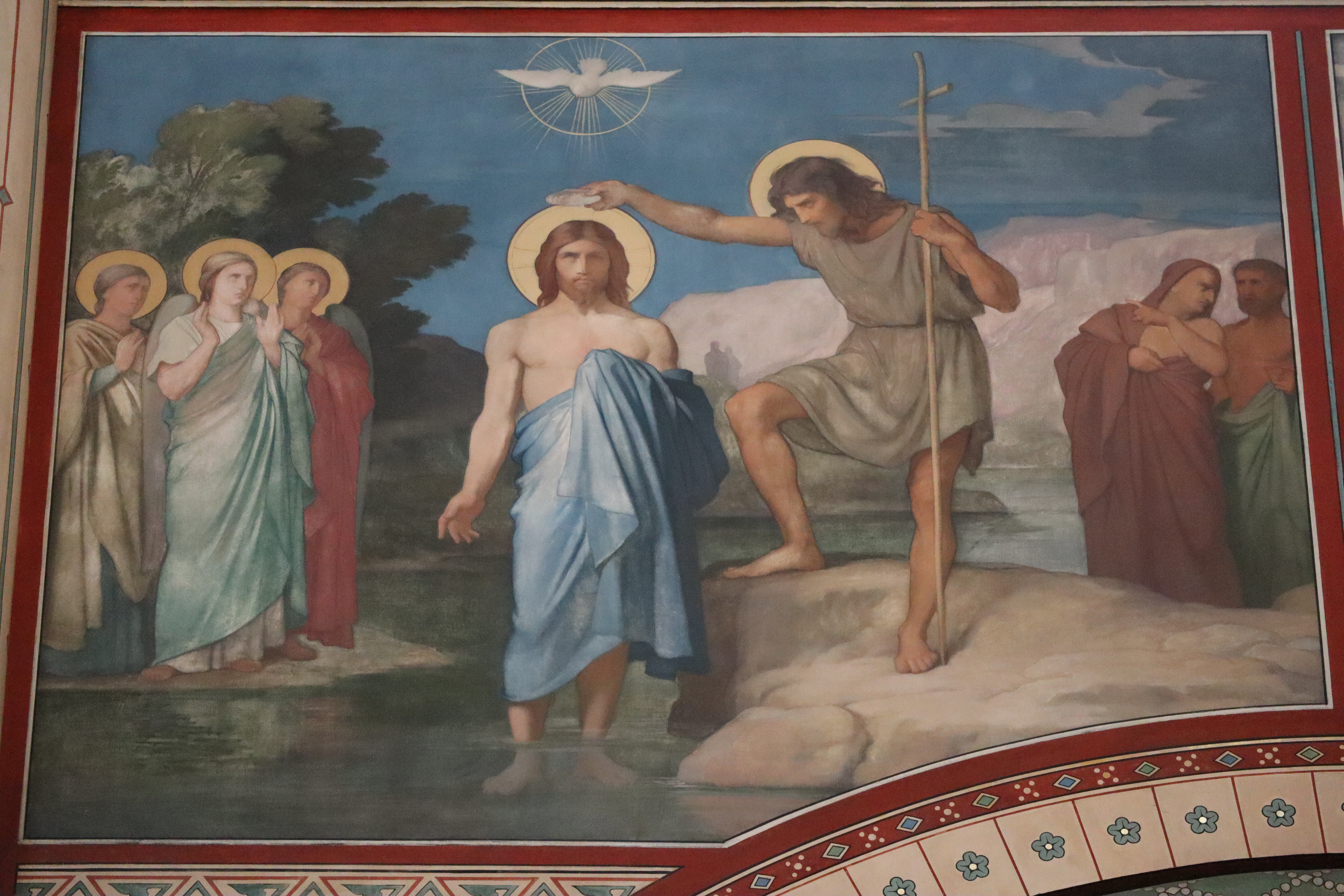
"The Baptism of Christ" (North side, fourth traverse)

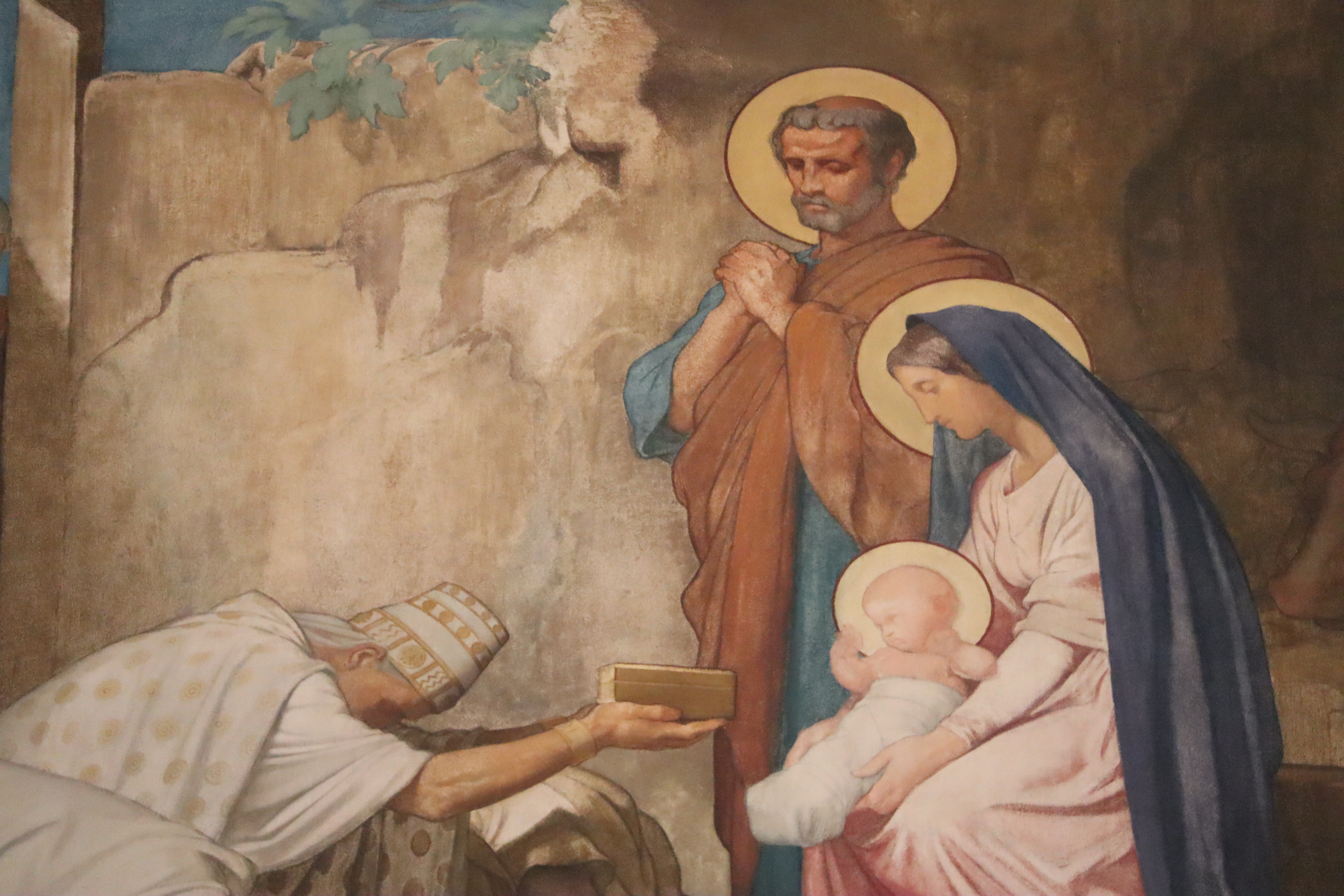
"Adoration of the Magi"(North side, third traverse)

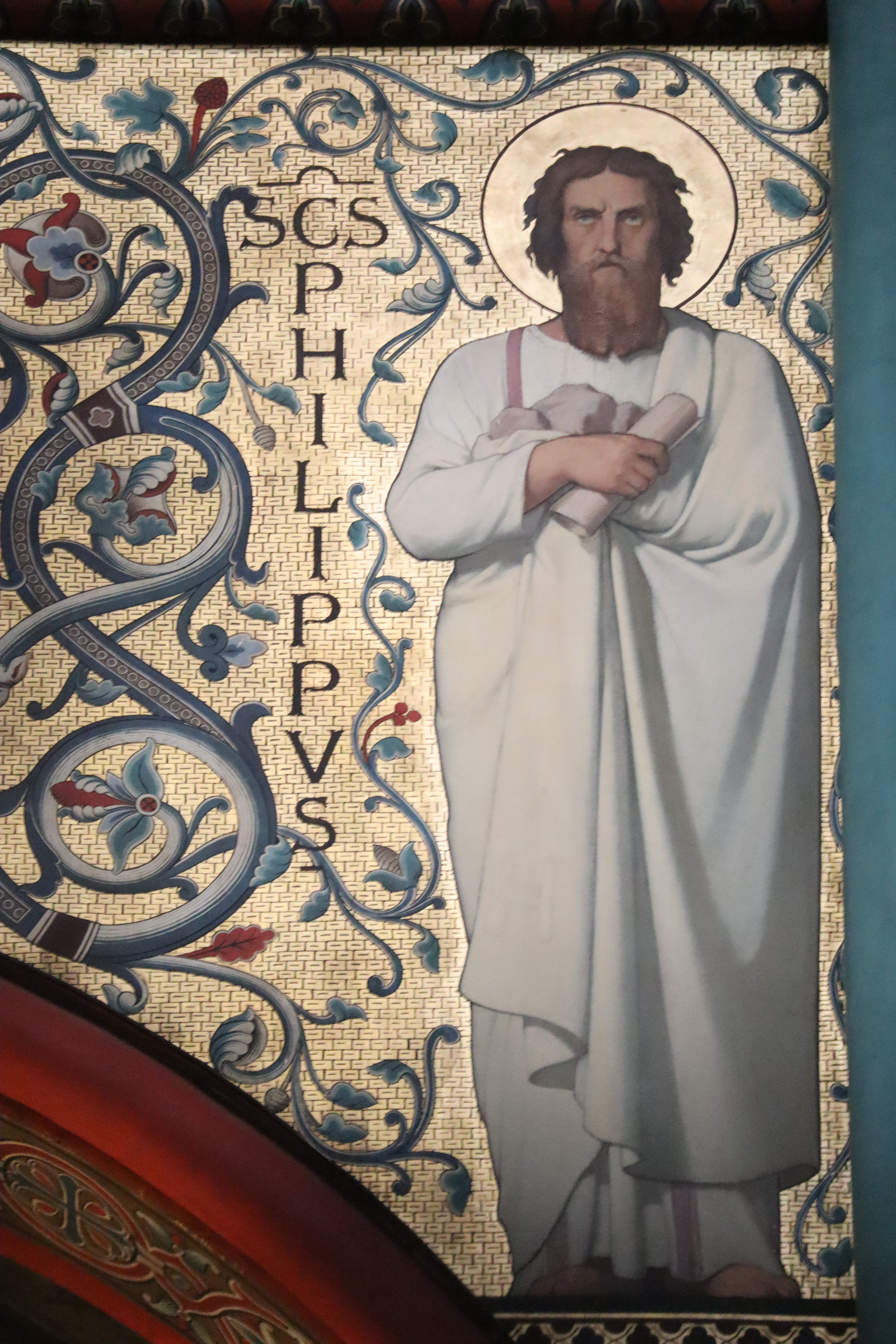
"The Apostle Philip" (Choir)

The most ambitious artistic work in the church is the cycle of twenty murals in the sanctuary, the choir and the nave, which was commissioned by the architect Victor Baltard to a single artist, Hippolyte Flandrin (1809–1864). Flandrin conceived a series of paintings depicting scenes of the Old Testament which prefigured the New Testament. Flandrin was aided in the project by his brother, Paul Flandrin (1811–1902), who signed the painting of the last traverse. The paintings were inspired by variety of different styles, ranging from the Byzantine style of the 13th century, the Italian primitive style of the 14th century, and the Roman Renaissance style of the 16th century. The final work, in the north transept, was finished after his death by one of his students, Sebastien Cornu. Numerous other artists assisted the project, notably Alexandre Denuelle, who painted the elaborate designs which framed the murals.

=== Altars and the Pulpit ===
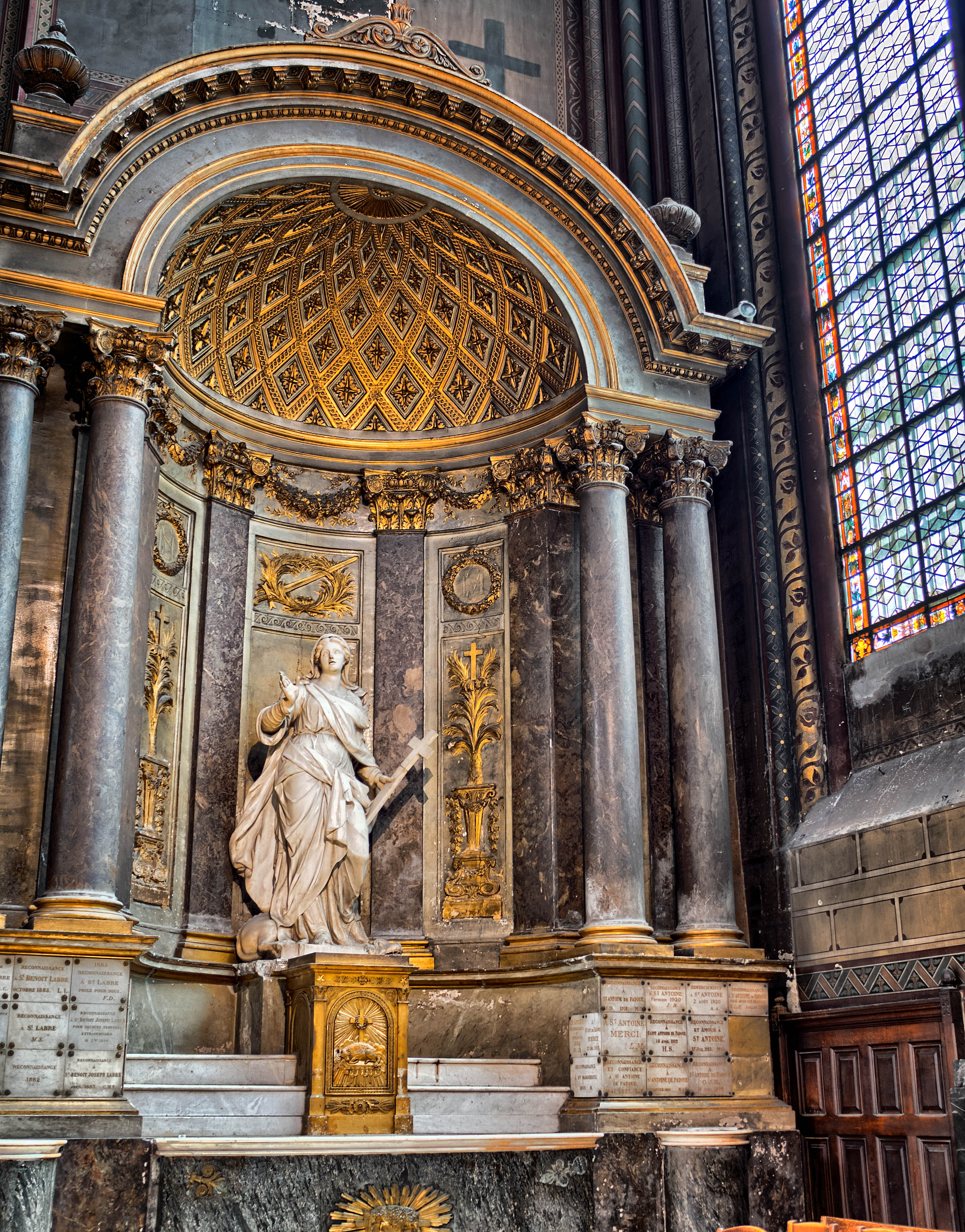
Saint Margaret the Virgin by Jacques Bourlet (1705) (South Transept)

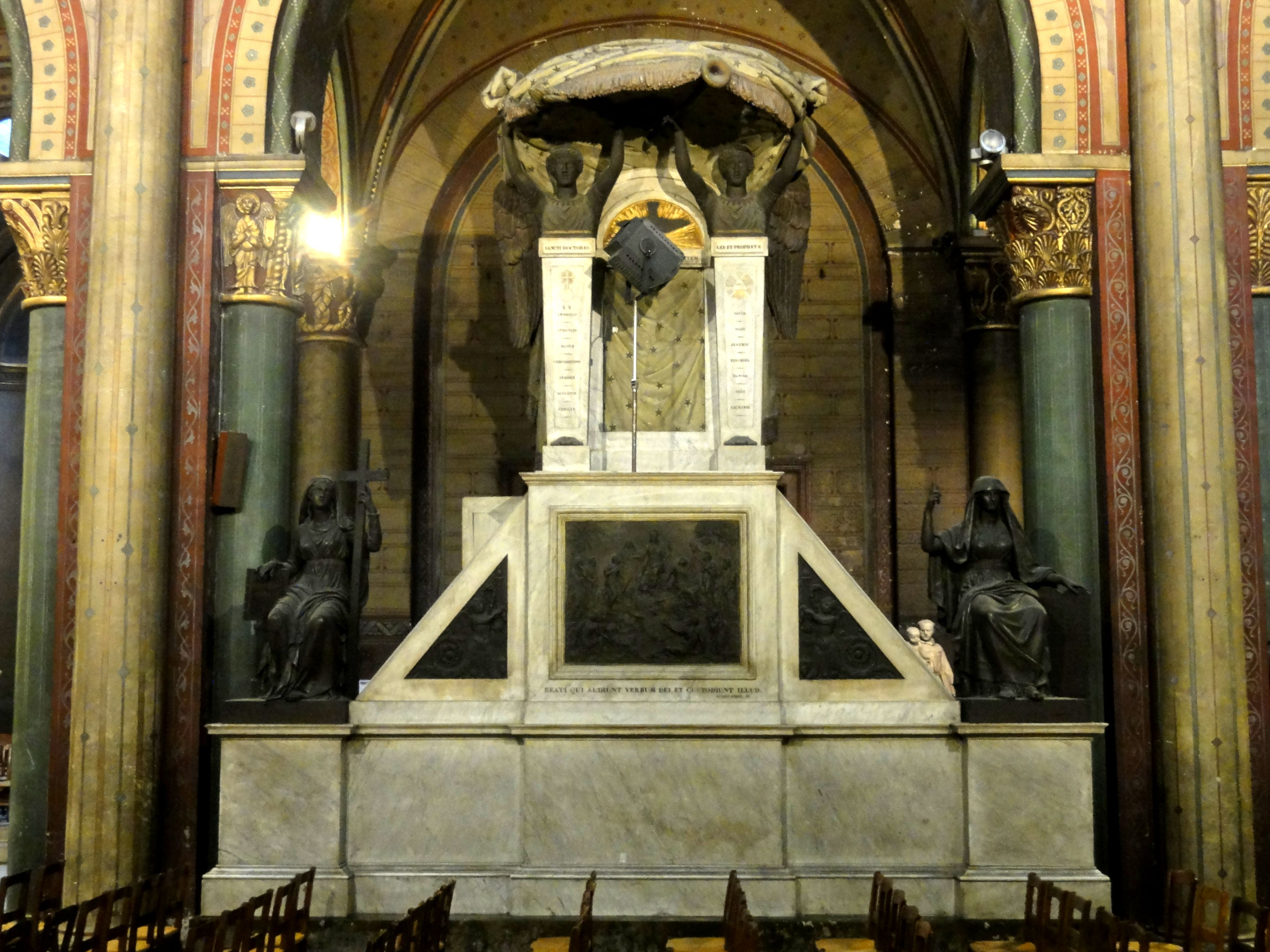
The pulpit in the nave designed by Quatremère de Quincy in 1827

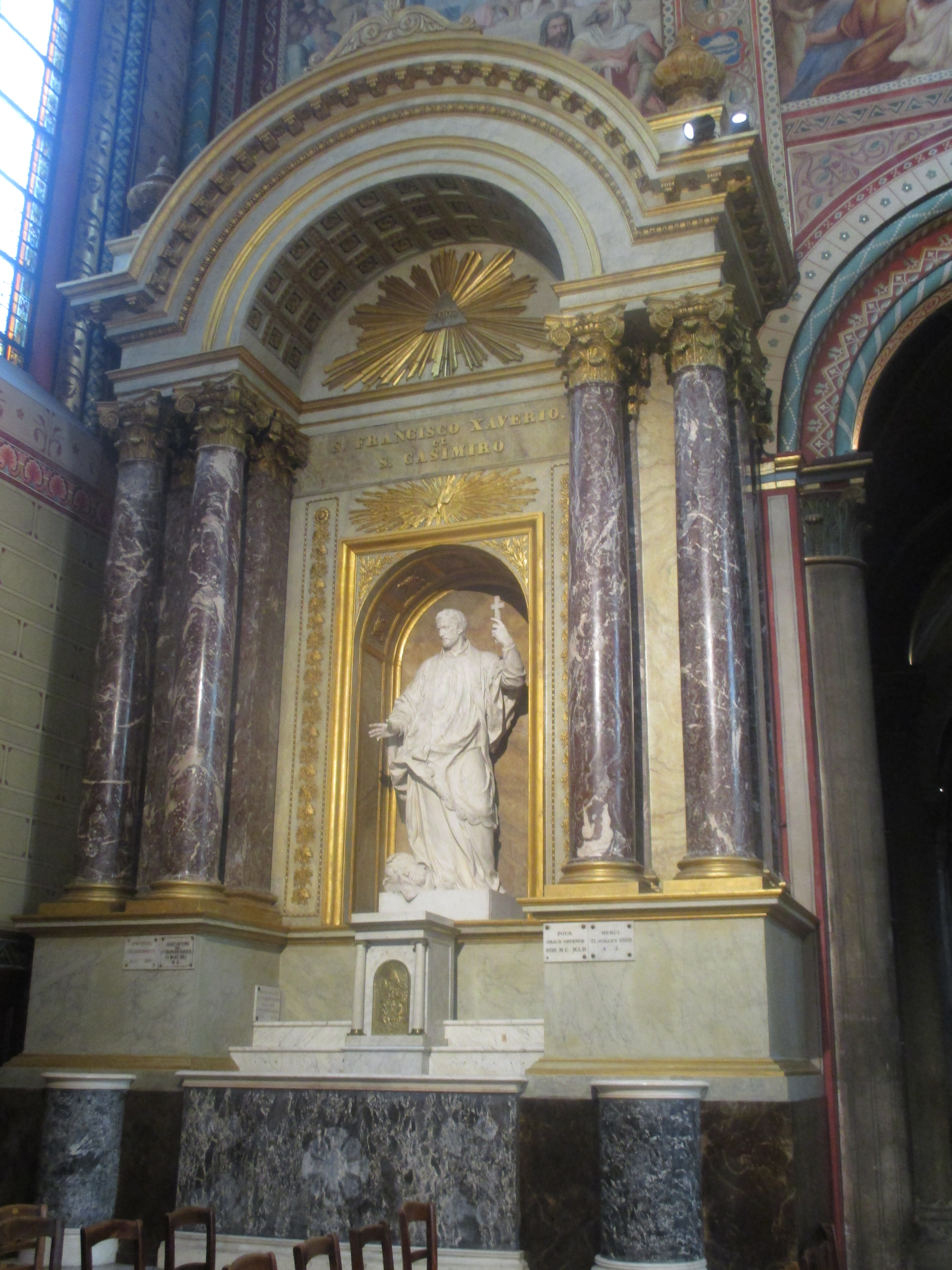
Saint Francis Xavier (Disambulateory chapel)

The marble pulpit in the nave (1827) was designed by Quatremère de Quincy, the highly-influential theorist and art historian who led the movement promoting classical Roman and Greek features in French architecture. The columns and cupolas of the altars in the church illustrated the classical revival doctrines.

=== Column Capitals ===
==== Original Column capitals (12th c.) ====
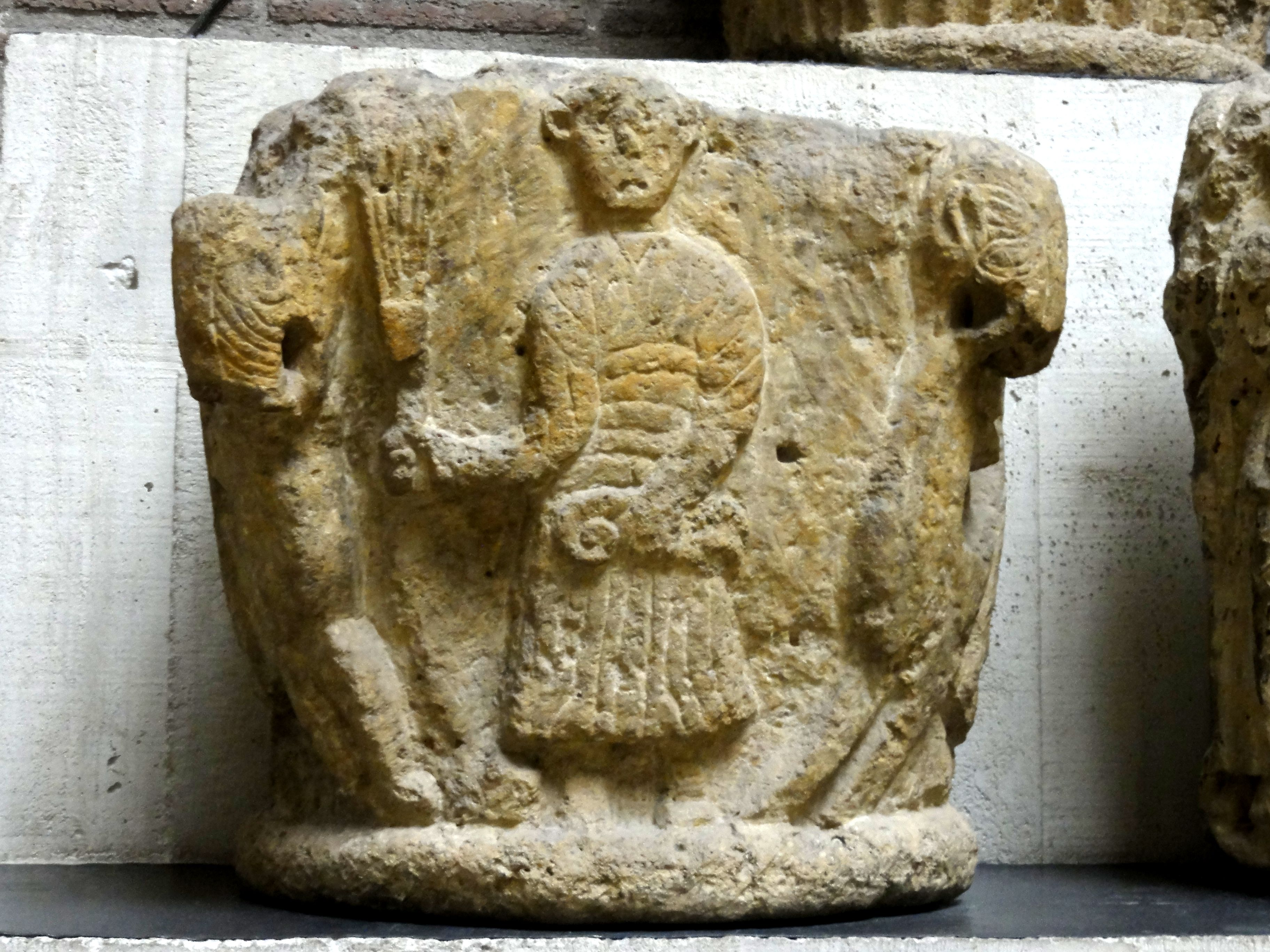
Original column capital from grand arcade of choir, south side (Now in Cluny Museum)

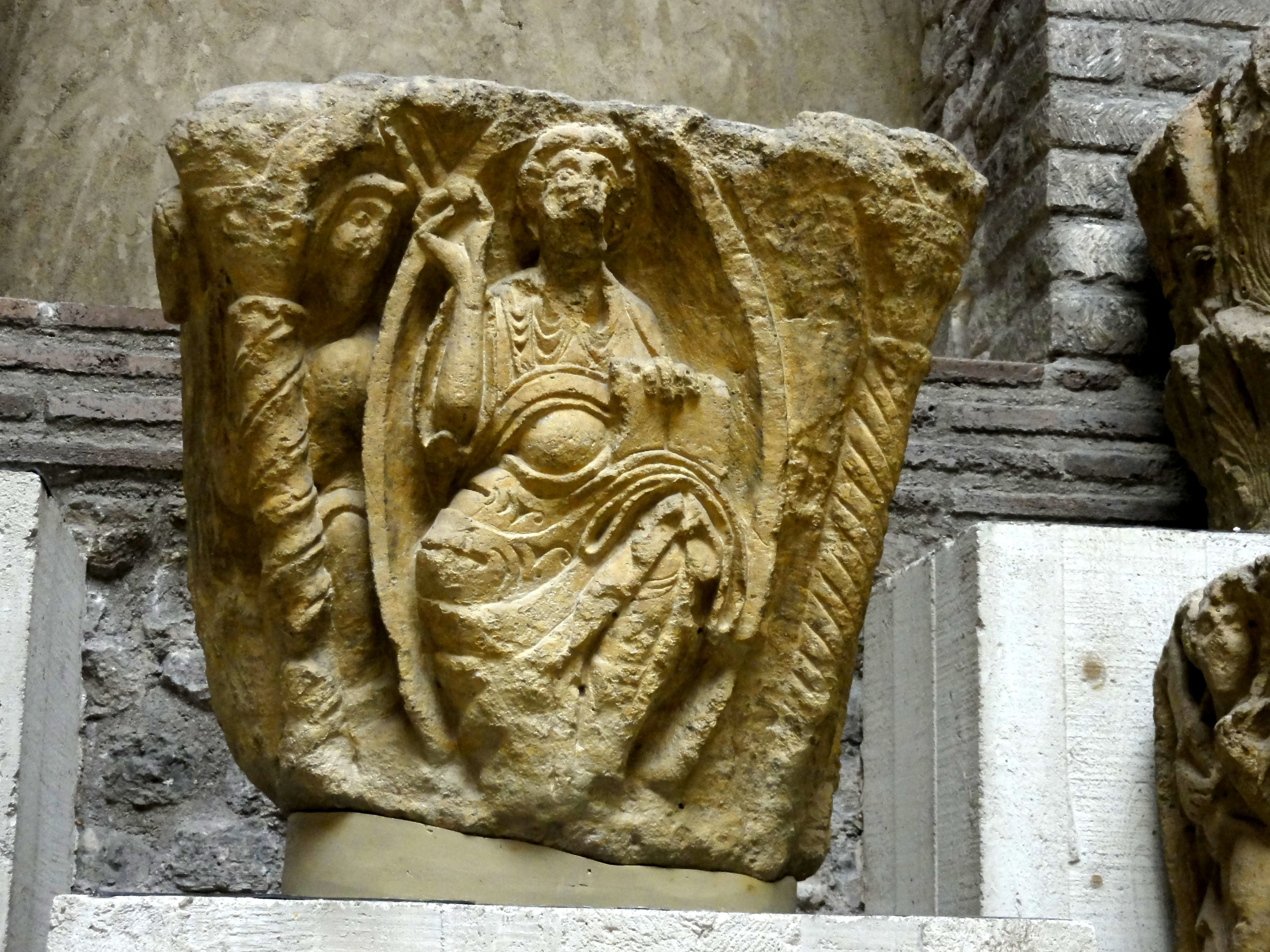
Original choir capital column, "Christ in Majesty", now in Cluny Museum

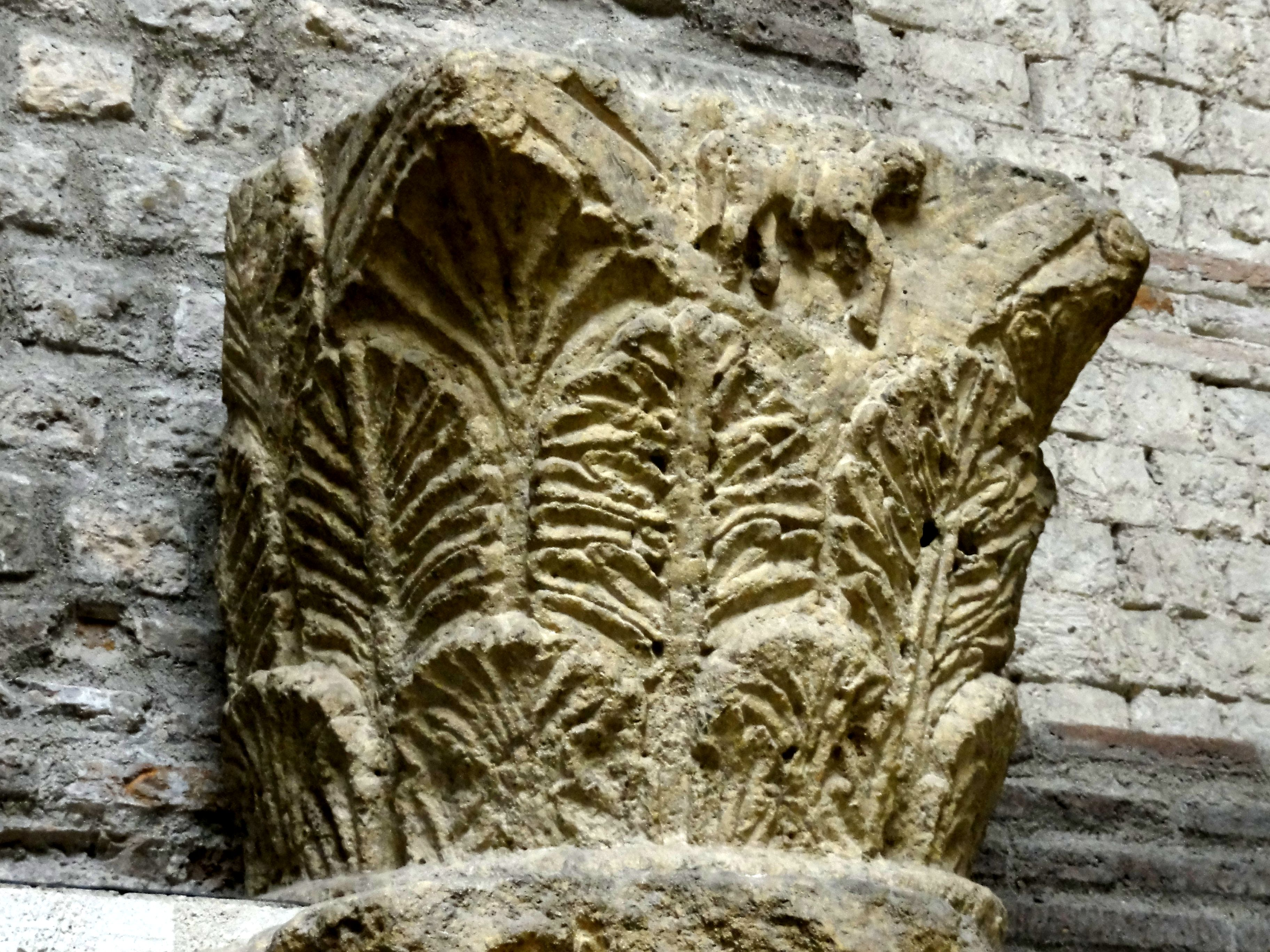
Original column capital, now in Cluny Museum

The original sculpted capitals of the columns in the nave were removed in the 19th century, and placed in the Cluny Museum for their preservation. They were replaced by modern versions with bright colors, to match the rest of the restored interior.

=== Gothic revival Column Capitals (19th c.) ===
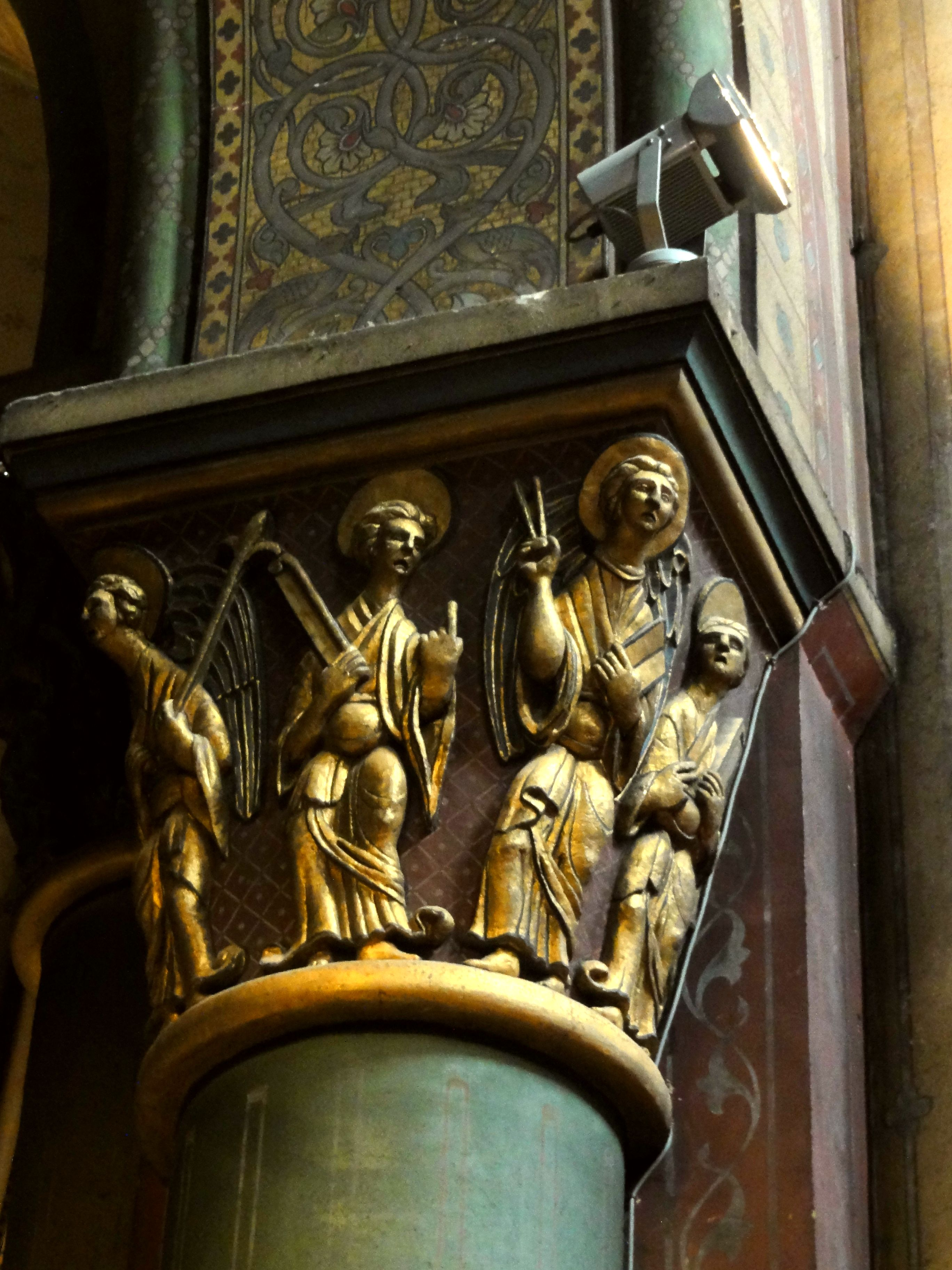
Gothic revival capais (4th grand arcade on north) (19th c.)

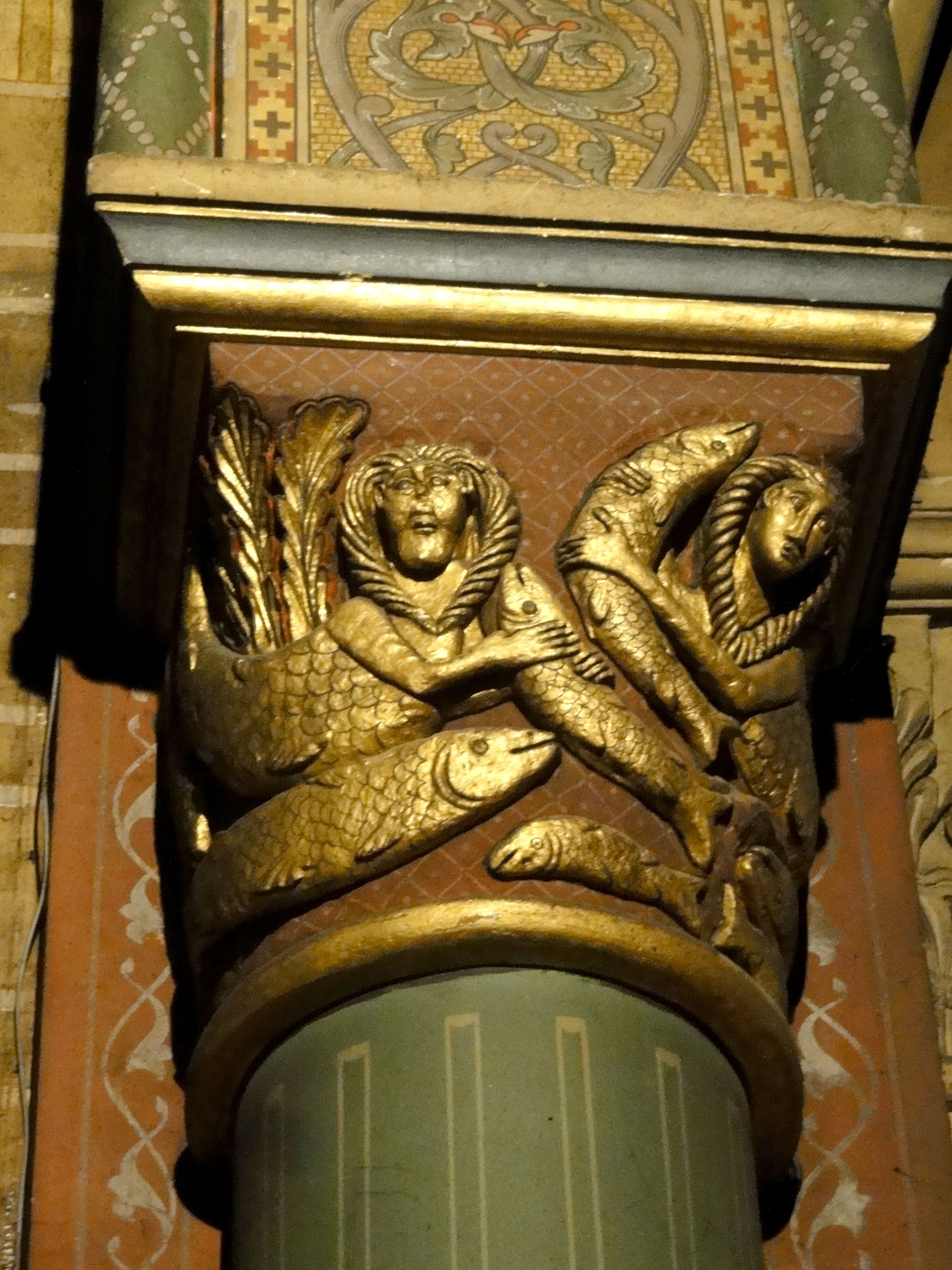
Gothic revival capital, First grand arcade north (19th c.)

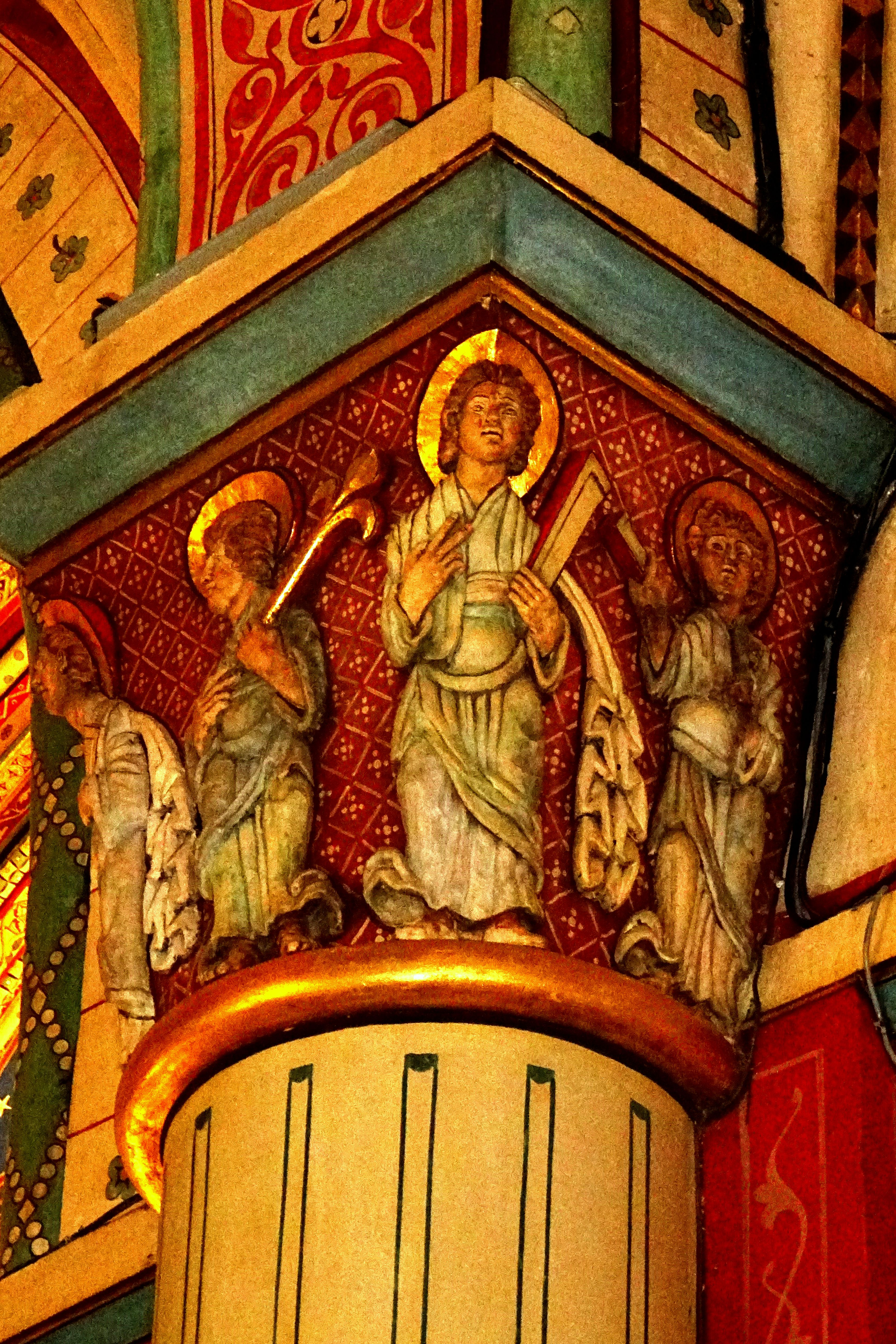
Gothic revival capital (north lower side)

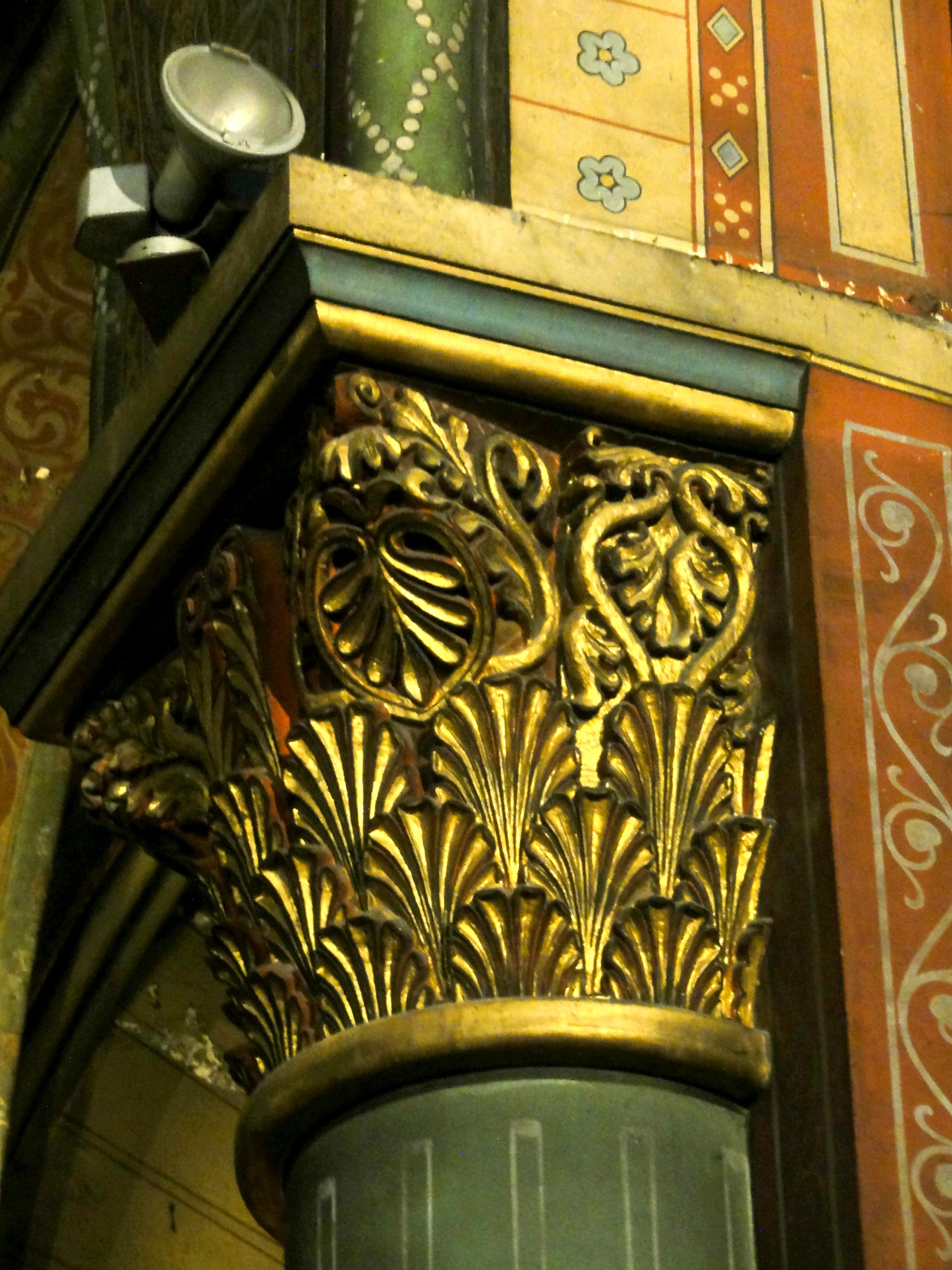
Gothic revival capital (north Grand Arcade)

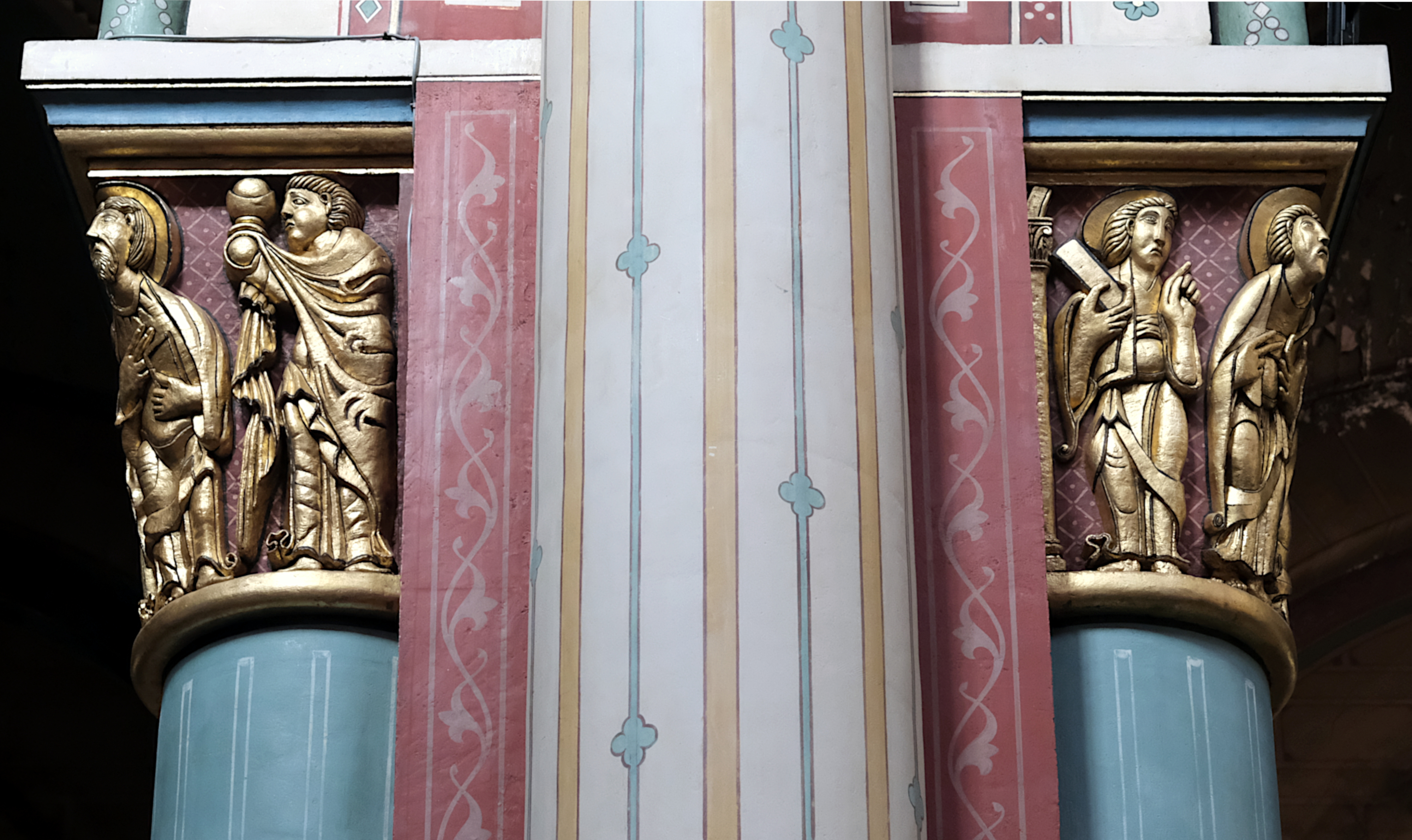
Gothic revival capital in Nave (19th c.)

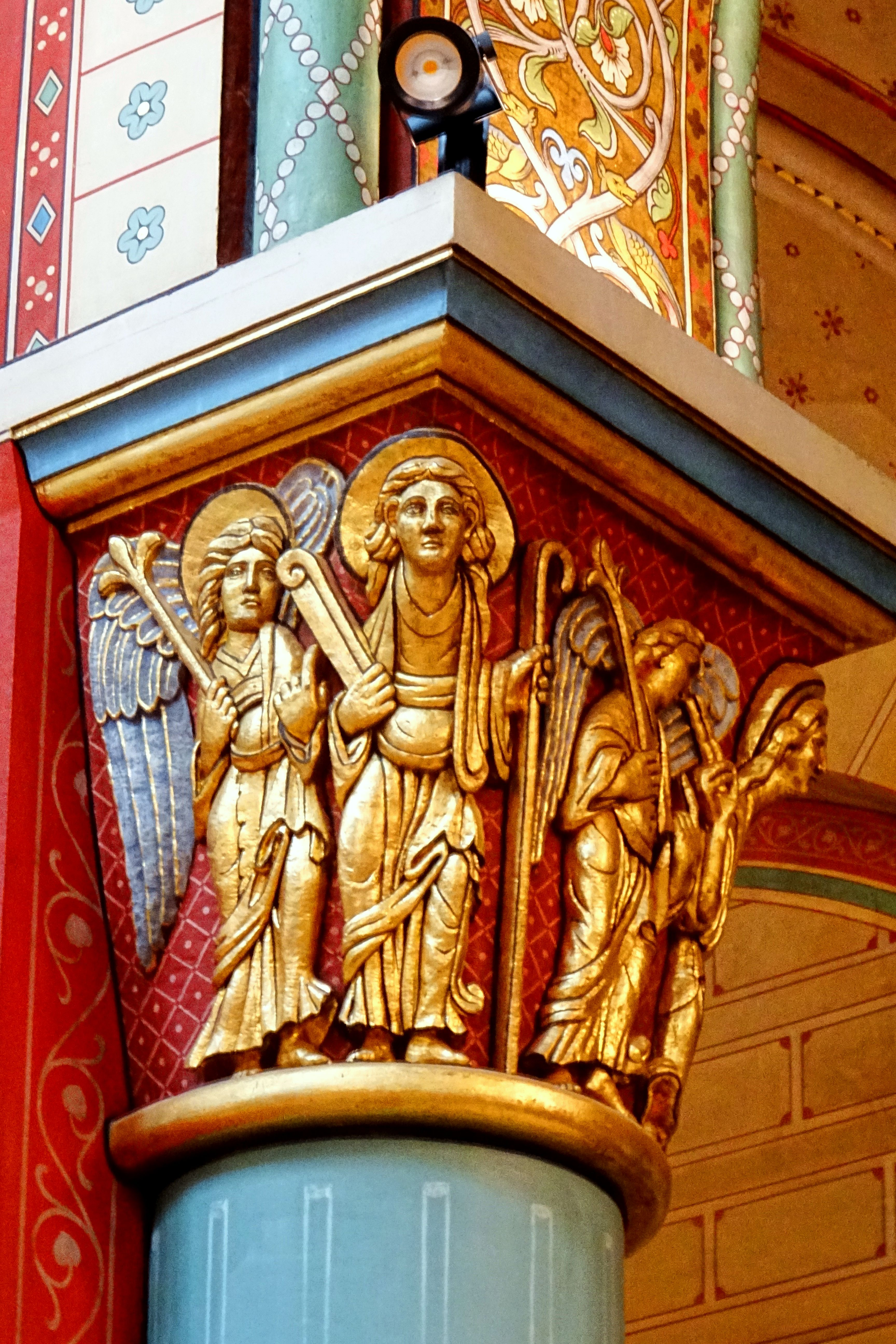
Gothic revival capital (north Grand arcade)

The new column capitals installed during the renovation by Hippolyte Flandrin were directly inspired by the surviving originals, which, in a very poor state of preservation, had largely been transferred to the Cluny Museum. The new capitals took their inspiration from the varied styles of the originals; Byzantine of the 12th century, Italian primitive from the 14th century and Romaneque from the 16th century.

=== Stained Glass ===
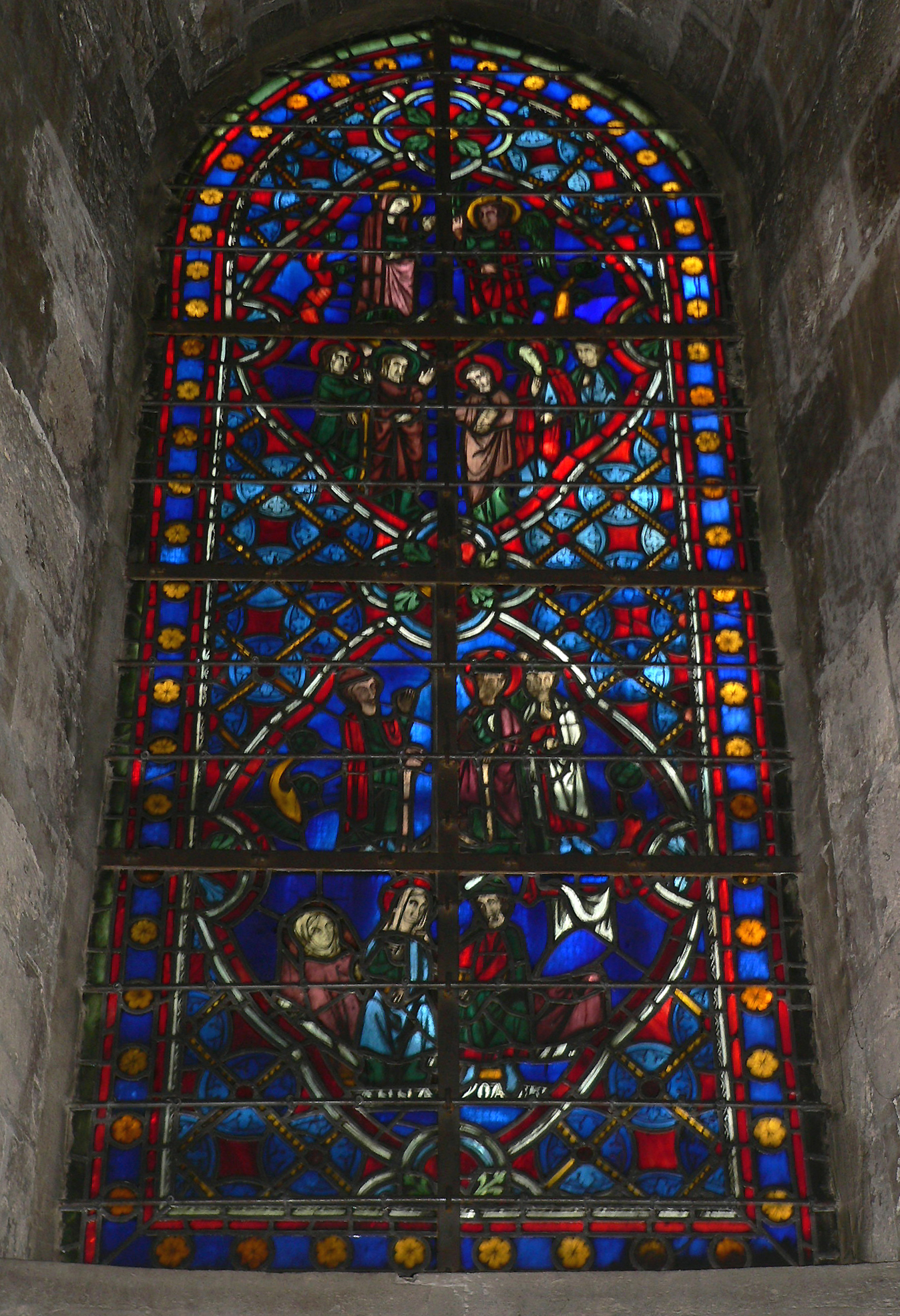
Window formerly in Lady Chapel, now in Chapel of Sainte-Geneviève (13th c.)

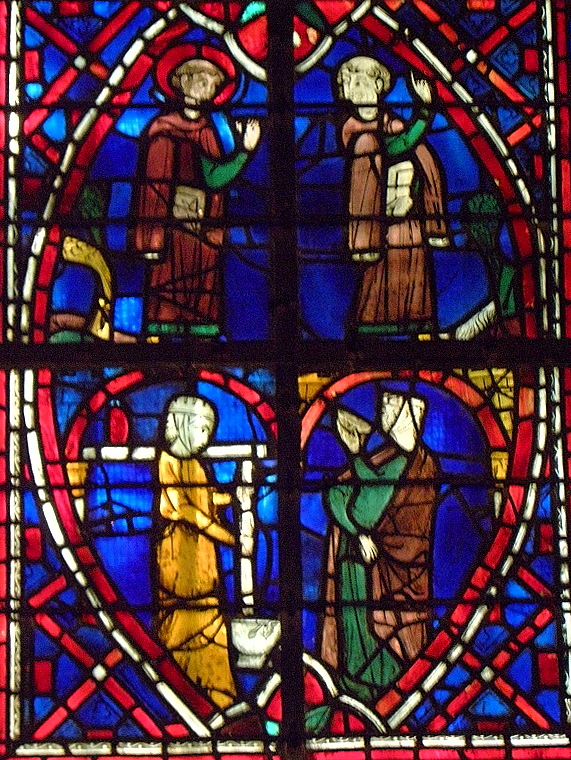
Detail of Misercordia window (13th century), Chapel of Saint-Genevieve (13th c.)

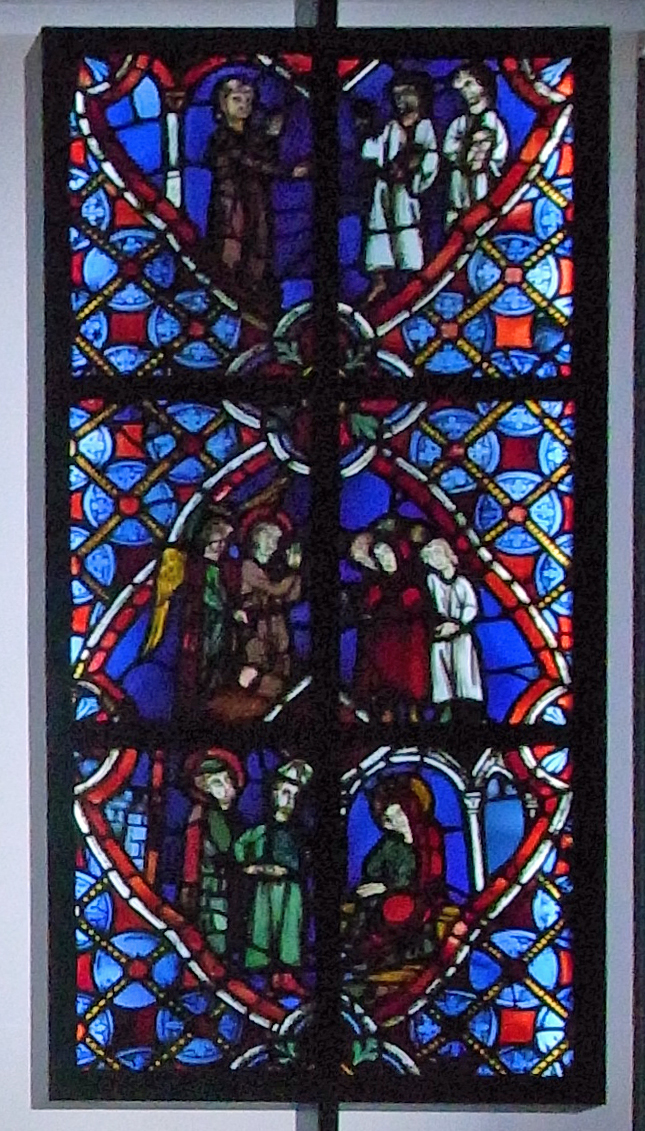
Window of Virgin Mary (1245–50), now in Victoria and Albert museum

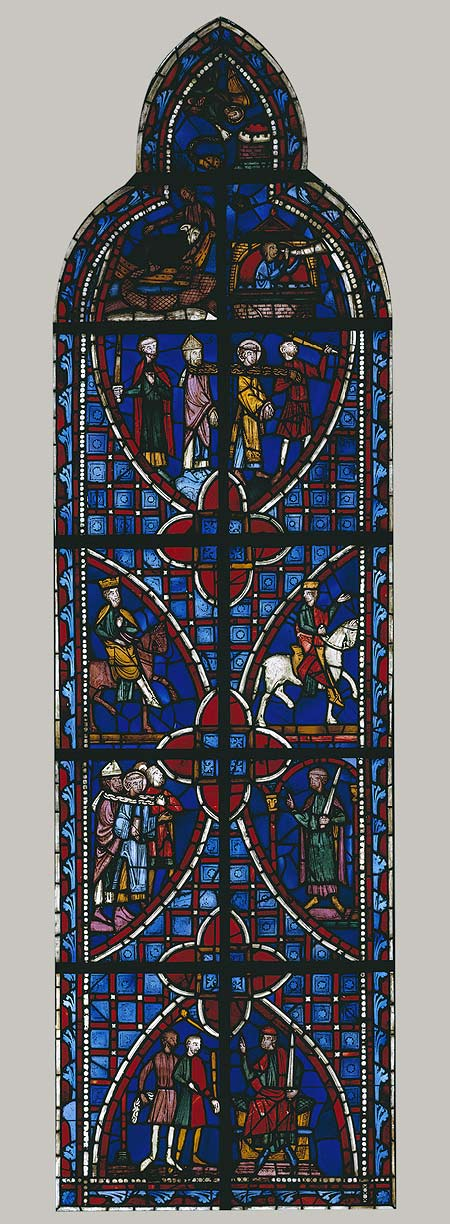
Scenes from Life of Saint Vincent of Zaragosa (13th century)

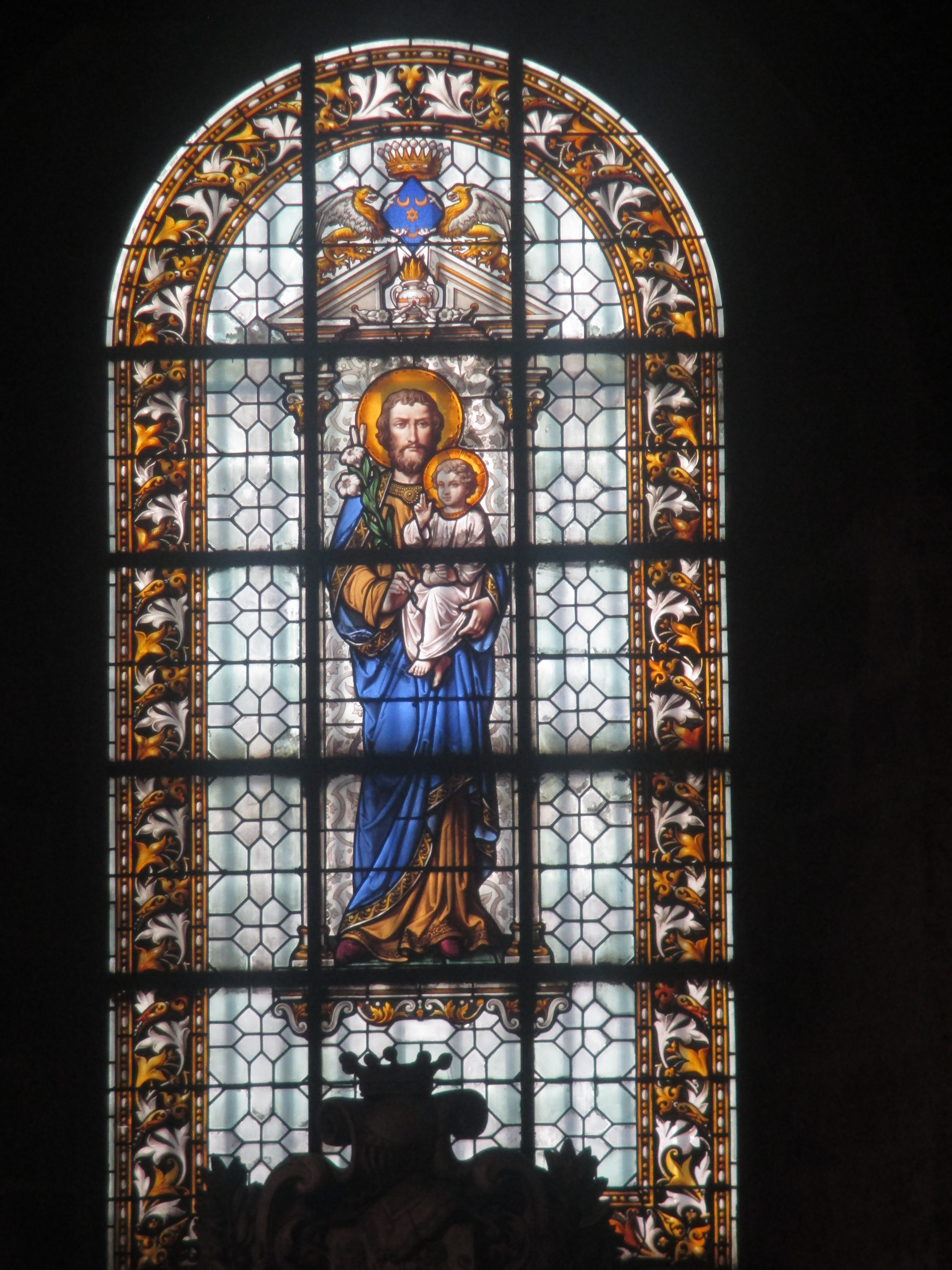
Saint Joseph holding infant Jesus (19th c.)

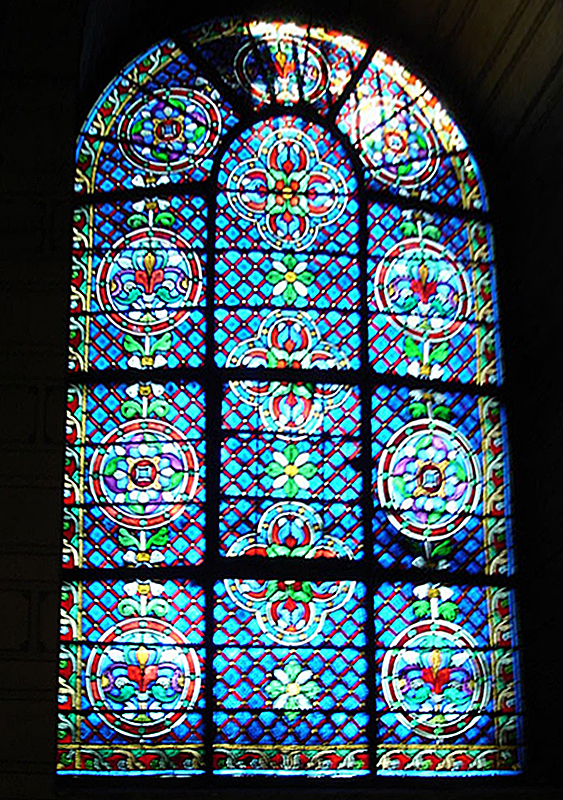
19th century window

Nearly all of the original stained glass in the church was destroyed during the French Revolution. Four original 13th century windows survive, and are now found in the Chapel of Saint Genevieve, mounted in two windows on the southeast side of the choir. The four panels that survived are classified by the Ministry if Culture as protected historic objects. They are typical of the style of the 13th century under Louis IX of France. They depict: Saint Anne and saint Joachim; the Annunciation; the Marriage of the Virgin (on a single panel); and works of "Misercordia", or mercy; divided between two panels. Some other windows from the Lady Chapel ended up in the Metropolitan Museum in New York, the Walters Art Museum in Baltimore, and the Victoria and Albert Museum in London, which has a window with scenes from the life of the Virgin Mary.

During the 19th century restoration, new windows for the rest of the church were designed by Flandrin, and were made by the master glass Alfred Gérente. This was the final stage of the restoration.

== The Organ ==
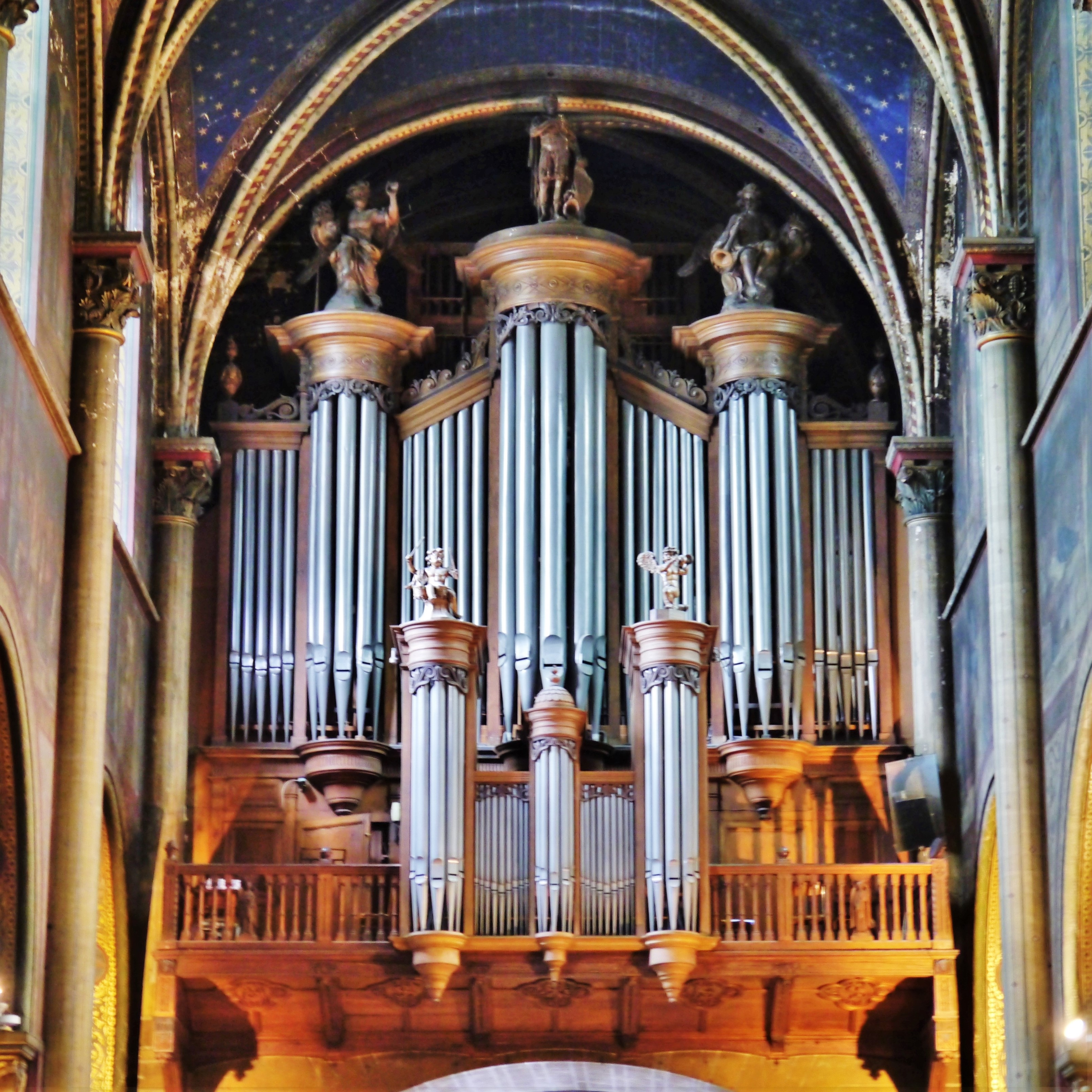
The main organ, with 17th-century sculpture on the towers

The organ in the tribune, over the entrance to the nave, is in the neoclassical style. It was built by Haerpfer-Erman (1973) and Fossaert (2004–2005). The towers of the case are decorated with sculpture of Saint Victor and musician-angels, created by Matthieu Lespagnandelle between 1617 and 1689. They were originally part of the organ at the abbey church of Saint-Victor.

== The Bishop's Palace, the Lady Chapel and Prison ==
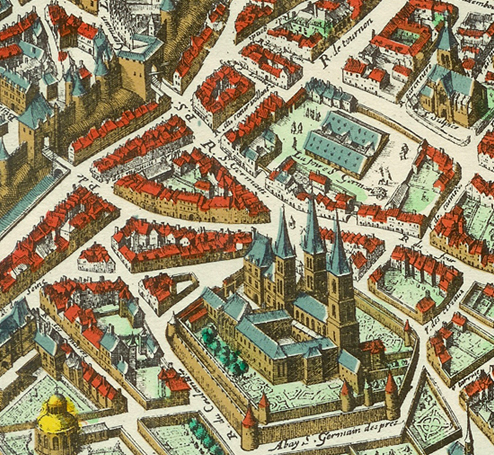
The abbey of Saint-Germain-des-Prés as depicted on the 1615 Merian map of Paris. The wall of Philip II Augustus is visible at the upper left.

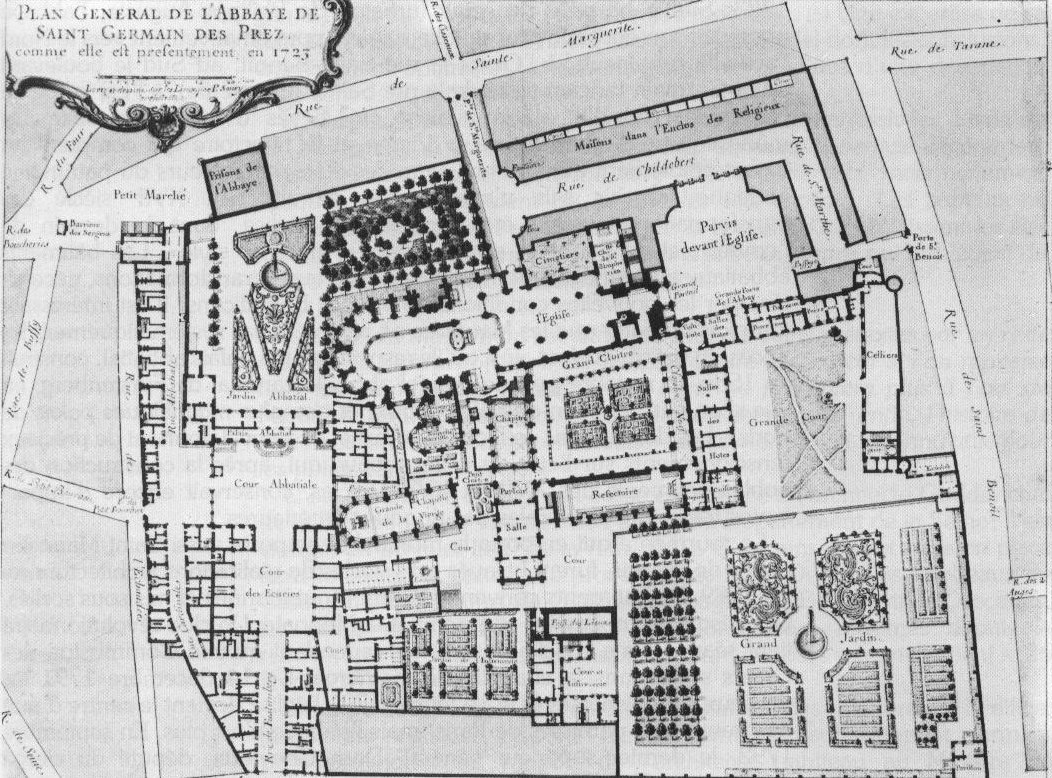
Plan of the Abbey (1723)

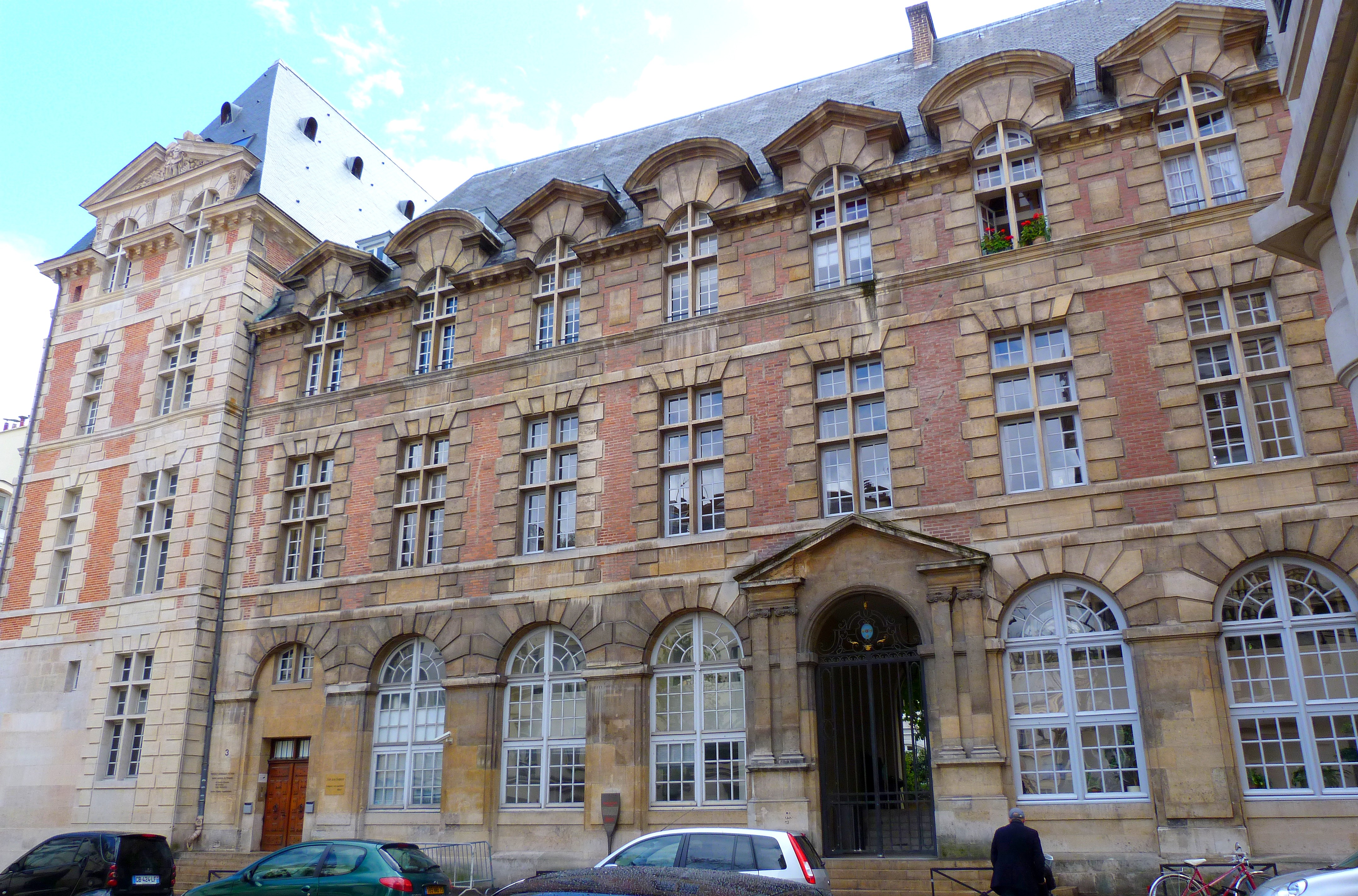
The Abbot's Palace (1586)

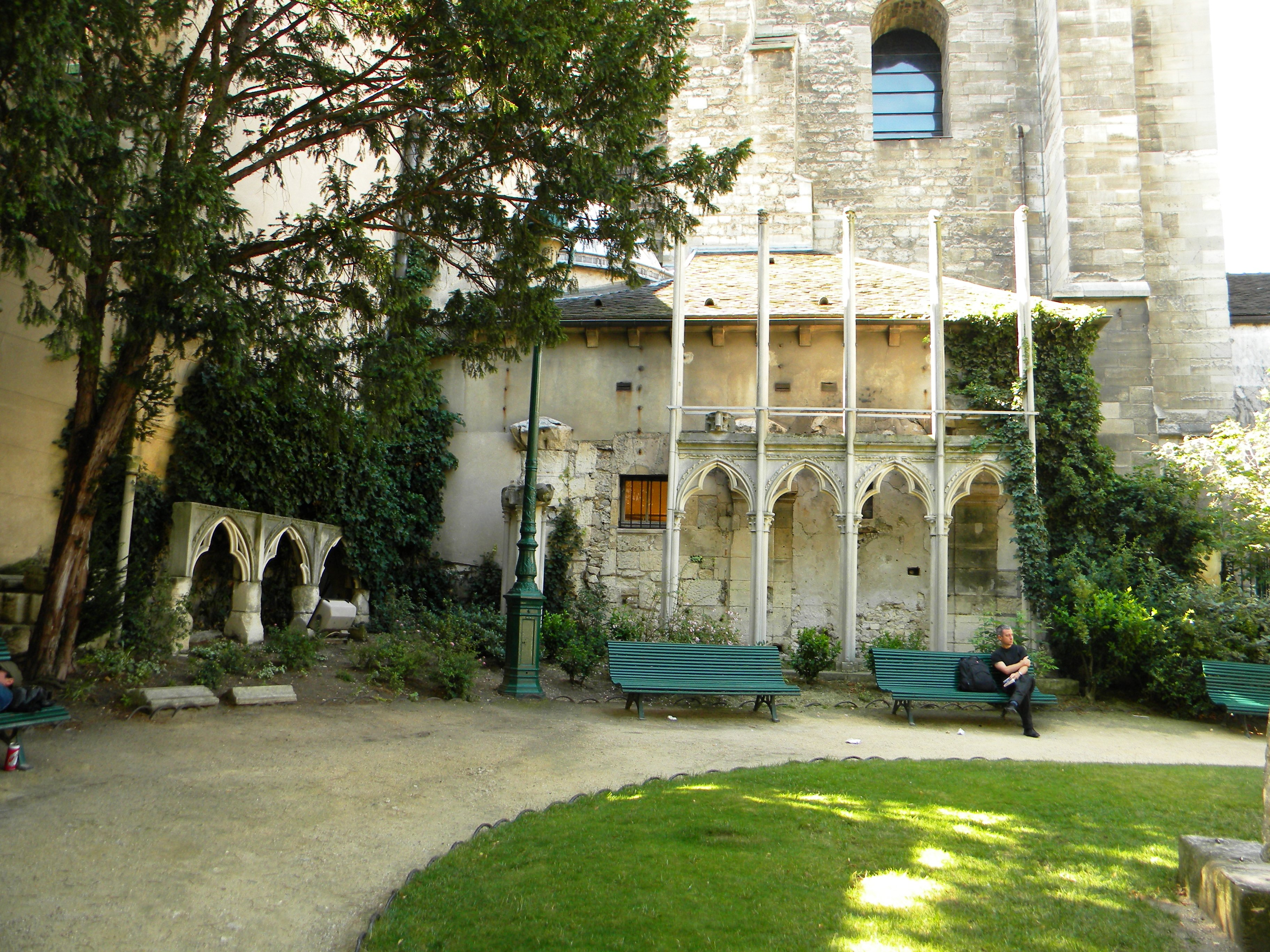
Flamboyant Gothic arches of the Chapel of the Virgin (13th c.) displayed in the Square next to the church

Today only two buildings of the original Abbey survive; the church and the former Abbot's Palace, next to it. Before the Revolution, it covered a much larger area; it extended to the area now bordered to the north by the (current) rue Jacob, to the East by the rue de l'Echaudée, to the south by the south side of the Boulevard Saint-Germain and the rue Gozlin, and to the west by the rue St-Benoit.

The Abbot's Palace, next door to the church on what is now Rue de l'Abbaye, was built in 1586 as the residence of the Cardinal de Bourbon. It was the second building in Paris to be built of brick and stone. It was in ruins after the Revolution. It was restored in the 19th century and now belongs to the Catholic Institute of Paris.

A Flamboyant Gothic lady chapel was built next to the church in about 1244–7, at what is now 8 rue de l'Abbaye. It was badly damaged during the Revolution and was finally demolished in the early 19th century. Some of the flamboyant arches of the church can be seen in the small park next to the church at the corner of rue Bonaparte and Rue de l'Abbaye. Some of the stained glass windows of the church were also saved; some are in the choir of the main church, while others are found in museums in France, England and the United States. Some windows, including a scene showing the death of Saint Germain, are currently in the collection of Winchester College.

From 1275 to 1636, the pillory of the Abbey was located in the current Place d'Acadie, better known to Parisians as the Mabillon due to the eponymous Métro station located there. This square was therefore called the Place du Pilori and the current rue de Buci leading to it was called the rue du Pilori.

The abbey had its own prison since the Middle Ages. It was located in what is now the Boulevard Saint-Germain, just west of the current Passage de la Petite Boucherie. It was rebuilt in 1635 and in 1675 it was requisitioned for a military prison. The prison was known for its extremely poor condition, for example, in 1836, Benjamin Appert wrote :

The cells are abominable and so humid that the soldiers incarcerated there, often for minor offences, must subsequently go to the Val-de-Grâce hospital to recover from their imprisonment.

During the Revolution it became notorious as the site of some of the September Massacres that took place on 2–7 September 1792. The prison was used by the Sans Culottes to confine priests who were suspected of opposing the Revolution. Those who refused to take an oath of allegiance to the Revolutionary government were sent out one-by-one to the Abbot's garden and killed.

== Burials ==
- Childebert I
- Chilperic I
- Clothar II
- Bertrude
- Chilperic II
- Childeric II
- Bilichild
- Germain of Paris
- Fredegund (The tomb of Fredegund (Frédégonde) is now situated in the Saint Denis Basilica, having been moved from the abbey church of Saint-Germain-des-Prés).
- John II Casimir Vasa (Heart only, body transferred to Wawel Cathedral)
- Wilhelm Egon von Fürstenberg
- George Douglas, 1st Earl of Dumbarton
- Lord James Douglas
- William Douglas, 10th Earl of Angus
- Jacques Barbeu-Dubourg
- René Descartes
- Nicolas Boileau-Despréaux
- Louis César de Bourbon, Count of Vexin

The prison was the site of one of the September massacres of 1792 and was eventually destroyed to make way for the Boulevard Saint-Germain.

== See also ==
- Saint-Germain-des-Prés (Page on the Saint-Germain-des-Prés neighbourhood)
- List of historic churches in Paris

== Bibliography (in French) ==
- Dumoulin, Aline; Ardisson, Alexandra; Maingard, Jérôme; Antonello, Murielle; Églises de Paris (2010), Éditions Massin, Issy-Les-Moulineaux, ISBN 978-2-7072-0683-1
- Hillairet, Jacques; Connaissance du Vieux Paris; (2017); Éditions Payot-Rivages, Paris; (in French). ISBN 978-2-2289-1911-1
- Leborgne, Dominique, Saint-Germain-des-Prés et son faubourg,Editions Parigramme, Paris (2005), ISBN 2-84096-189-X
