= Lauder (surname) =

Lauder is a surname of Scottish origin. There are four distinct Lauder families with multiple notable members.

== Families with the name Lauder ==
=== Lauder family ===
- Estée Lauder (businesswoman) (1908–2004), founder of Estée Lauder Companies
- Leonard Lauder (son) (1933–2025)
- Ronald Lauder (son) (born 1944)
- William P. Lauder (grandson) (born 1960)

=== Lauder Greenway family ===
- George Lauder Sr. (1815–1901), leader of the Chartism movement in Scotland, progenitor of the Lauder Greenway family
- George Lauder (Scottish industrialist) (son) (1837–1924), Scottish billionaire industrialist, partner in the Carnegie Steel Company
- George V. Lauder (CIA) (great-grandson) (1924–2012), American intelligence officer with the CIA
- George V. Lauder (biologist) (great-great grandson), American biologist, curator at the Museum of Comparative Zoology

=== Lauder baronets ===
- Sir John Lauder, 1st Baronet (died 1692)
- John Lauder, Lord Fountainhall (1646–1722)
- Sir John Lauder, 3rd Baronet (1669–1728)
- Sir Alexander Lauder, 4th Baronet (1698–1730)
- Sir Andrew Lauder, 5th Baronet (1702–1769)
- Sir Andrew Dick-Lauder, 6th Baronet (died 1820)
- Sir Thomas Dick Lauder, 7th Baronet (1784–1848)
- Sir John Dick-Lauder, 8th Baronet (1813–1867)
- Sir Thomas North Dick-Lauder, 9th Baronet (1846–1919)
- Sir George William Dalrymple Dick-Lauder, 10th Baronet (1852–1936)
- Sir John North Dalrymple Dick-Lauder, 11th Baronet (1883–1958)
- Sir George Andrew Dick-Lauder, 12th Baronet (1917–1981)
- Sir Piers Robert Dick Lauder, 13th Baronet (born 1947)

=== Lauders of the Bass ===
- Alexander Lauder (d. 1440), Bishop of Dunkeld
- George Lauder (bishop) (died 1466), medieval Scottish bishop
- George Lauder of the Bass (died 1611), Scottish administrator
- John Lauder (c.1488-??), Scotland's Public Accuser of Heretics
- Robert Lauder of Quarrelwood (died c. 1370), Justiciar of Scotia
- Robert de Lawedre of Edrington (died 1425), Hostage for King James I of Scotland
- Robert Lauder of the Bass (c. 1440 – 1508), armiger, and governor of the castle at Berwick-upon-Tweed
- Robert Lauder of the Bass (died 1576) (c. 1504 – 1576), Lord of The Bass and land magnate in Haddingtonshire, Berwickshire, and Fife
- Robert Lauder of Popill (died 1575), member of the old Scottish Parliament
- Robert Lauder of Beilmouth (died 1709), armiger, lawyer, and Clerk of Exchequer in Scotland
- Thomas Lauder (1395–1481), Scottish churchman
- William de Lauder (1380–1425), bishop of Glasgow

== Other people with the surname Lauder ==
- Abram William Lauder (1834–1884), Canadian lawyer and politician
- Afferbeck Lauder, pseudonym of Alastair Ardoch Morrison (1911–1998), Australian graphic artist
- Alexander Lauder of Blyth (died 1513), Provost of Edinburgh (1500–1513)
- Andrew Lauder (born 1947), music executive and record label founder
- Colin Lauder (1750–1831), Fellow of the Royal College of Surgeons, Edinburgh
- David Ross Lauder (1894–1972), Scottish Victoria Cross recipient
- George Lauder (disambiguation)
- Harry Lauder (1870–1950), Scottish music-hall entertainer
- Hayley Lauder (born 1990), Scottish association footballer
- James Eckford Lauder (1811–1869), Scottish artist
- John Lauder (surgeon) (1683–1737), surgeon to George Heriot's Hospital
- Maria Elise Turner Lauder (1833–1922), Canadian writer
- Robert Lauder (disambiguation)
- William Lauder (disambiguation)

== Fictional characters ==
- Jack Lauder, the murder victim in the mystery game The Shivah
