= Robert Lauder (disambiguation) =

Robert Lauder was a Scottish prelate and nuncio of the 15th century.

Robert Lauder may also refer to:

- Sir Robert Lauder of Quarrelwood (died c. 1370), Justiciar of Scotia
- Sir Robert de Lawedre of Edrington (died 1425), Hostage for King James I of Scotland
- Sir Robert Lauder of the Bass (c. 1440 – 1508), armiger, and governor of the castle at Berwick-upon-Tweed
- Robert Lauder of the Bass (died 1576) (c. 1504 – 1576), Lord of The Bass and land magnate in Haddingtonshire, Berwickshire, and Fife
- Sir Robert Lauder of Popill (died 1575), member of the old Scottish Parliament
- Sir Robert Lauder of Beilmouth (died 1709), armiger, lawyer, and Clerk of Exchequer in Scotland
- Robert Scott Lauder (1803–1869), Scottish mid-Victorian artist
