= George Lauder =

George Lauder may refer to:

- George Lauder (bishop) (died 1466), medieval Scottish bishop
- George Lauder of the Bass (died 1611), Scottish Member of Parliament
- George Lauder (surgeon) (1712–1752), Scottish surgeon
- George Lauder Sr. (1815–1901), Scottish political leader
- George Lauder (industrialist) (1837–1924), Scottish industrialist, partner in the Carnegie Steel Company
- George V. Lauder (CIA) (1924–2012), American intelligence officer
- George V. Lauder (biologist) (fl. 1970s–2002), American biologist

== See also ==
- George de Lawedre of Haltoun (1351–1426), Provost of Edinburgh
