= Auldcathie =

Suburb in West Lothian, Scotland

- Suburb
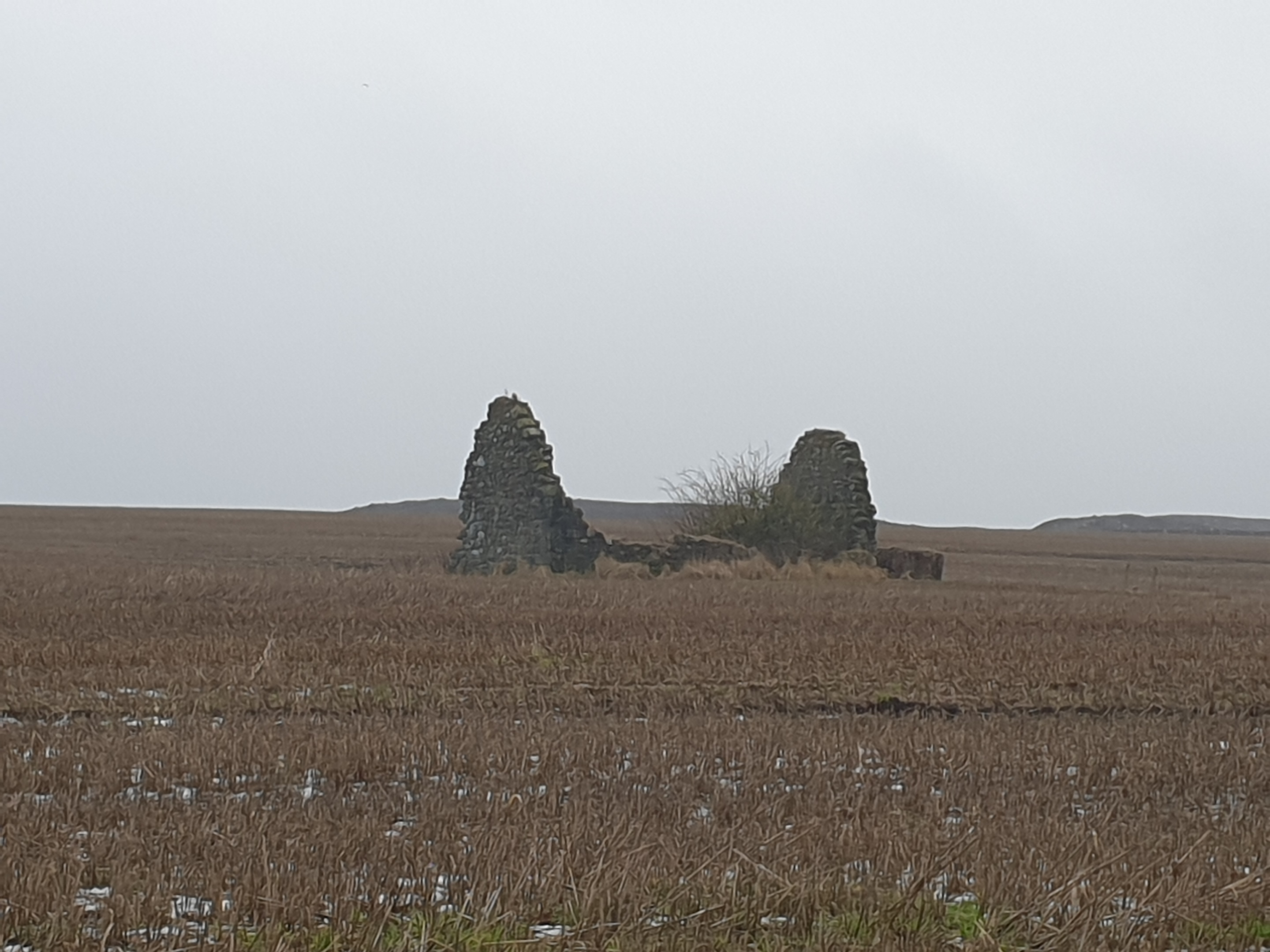
- Auldcathie ruined church (late 14th century)

- Location in Scotland
- Coordinates: 55°58′01″N 3°28′30″W
- Country: United Kingdom
- District: Scotland
- Council area: West Lothian

Auldcathie is a suburb to the west of Winchburgh in West Lothian, Scotland.

== History ==
A small village existed at Auldcathie since at least medieval times when Auldcathie was a distinct parish until the Scottish Reformation when it was incorporated into the parish of Dalmeny.

Auldcathie Kirk is a ruined pre-reformation church with late 14th century details. The church was abandoned sometime after 1618. The church is a scheduled ancient monument cited as of national importance as an example of a private chapel. In the 19th century, the area had a farmstead and opencast quarry workings, now since demolished.

In the 20th century, part of the area was used as a landfill was redeveloped as a new park. Auldcathie district park is a new recreational and sporting venue that was built as part of the new winchburgh village developments. The park was planned to cover 78-acres, with up to 31,000 trees. In January 2023, the park was open to the public and used for an inaugural parkrun which was said to be Scotland's largest. The park has also been the site of an annual easter egg hunt.

== Notable people ==
Robert Lauder a nobleman who supported Mary, Queen of Scots at the battle of Langside held title to Auldcathie. His son Sir George Lauder of the Bass, a cleric, Privy Counsellor and Member of the Scottish Parliament was rector of Auldcathie in the 16th century.

Alexander Monteith was an Edinburgh surgeon born in Auldcathie.
