= List of listed buildings in Lauder, Scottish Borders =

This is a list of listed buildings in the parish of Lauder in the Scottish Borders, Scotland.

== List ==
Name	Location	Date Listed	Grid Ref. (Note: Sometimes known as OSGB36, the grid reference (where provided) is based on the British national grid reference system used by the Ordnance Survey. • "Guide to National Grid". Ordnance Survey. • "Get-a-map". Ordnance Survey.)	Geo-coordinates	Notes	LB Number (Note: Historic Environment Scotland assign a unique alphanumeric identifier to each designated site in Scotland, for listed buildings this always begins with "LB", for example "LB12345".)	Image
Mid Row, Lauder Town Hall				55°43′09″N 2°44′53″W	Category B	37201	Upload another image
7 Mid Row				55°43′09″N 2°44′51″W	Category C(S)	37214	Upload Photo
13 West High Street				55°43′13″N 2°45′00″W	Category C(S)	37219	Upload Photo
1-3 (Inclusive Nos) The Loan				55°43′17″N 2°45′13″W	Category C(S)	37225	Upload Photo
6 Mill Wynd, Including Railed Wall				55°43′04″N 2°44′56″W	Category B	37226	Upload Photo
28 And 30 East High Street				55°43′06″N 2°44′42″W	Category C(S)	47660	Upload Photo
Thirlestane Castle Estate, Garden Cottage				55°43′41″N 2°45′15″W	Category C(S)	51314	Upload Photo
East High Street, Lauder Church (Church Of Scotland), Including Entrance Gates And Churchyard Wall				55°43′08″N 2°44′54″W	Category A	37200	Upload another image See more images
20-24 (Even Nos) Market Place				55°43′09″N 2°44′54″W	Category C(S)	37204	Upload Photo
22-26 (Even Nos) West High Street				55°43′12″N 2°45′01″W	Category C(S)	37217	Upload Photo
1 The Row				55°43′18″N 2°45′08″W	Category C(S)	37224	Upload Photo
Market Place, K6 Telephone Kiosk To N Of Lauder Post Office At No 18				55°43′10″N 2°44′55″W	Category B	37228	Upload Photo
Harryburn House Including Stables, Gates, Gatepiers And Railings				55°43′35″N 2°45′31″W	Category B	13406	Upload Photo
3 East High Street				55°43′10″N 2°44′52″W	Category C(S)	47655	Upload Photo
4 The Loan				55°43′17″N 2°45′15″W	Category C(S)	47666	Upload Photo
5-7 (Inclusive Nos) The Loan				55°43′16″N 2°45′16″W	Category C(S)	47667	Upload Photo
Norton Farmhouse				55°43′49″N 2°44′02″W	Category C(S)	51313	Upload Photo
1 East High Street				55°43′11″N 2°44′53″W	Category C(S)	37203	Upload Photo
1 Market Place, The Eagle Hotel, Including Outbuildings To North East				55°43′12″N 2°44′57″W	Category C(S)	37206	Upload Photo
59 West High Street				55°43′17″N 2°45′08″W	Category C(S)	37222	Upload Photo
The Loan, Lea Park				55°43′16″N 2°45′19″W	Category C(S)	47669	Upload Photo
Terrace At Loan View, Including Nos 1 And 2 And 63 West High Street				55°43′18″N 2°45′09″W	Category C(S)	47670	Upload Photo
Castle Wynd, Hume Lodge Including Boundary Wall To N And W				55°43′19″N 2°45′01″W	Category C(S)	51309	Upload Photo
Chuckie Lodge (Formerly Harryburn Lodge)				55°43′33″N 2°45′24″W	Category B	51310	Upload Photo
Thirlestane Castle Estate, Walled Garden				55°43′39″N 2°45′10″W	Category C(S)	51316	Upload Photo
9 Market Place, Black Bull Hotel				55°43′11″N 2°44′54″W	Category B	37202	Upload Photo
53 And 55 (Odd Nos) West High Street				55°43′17″N 2°45′07″W	Category C(S)	37221	Upload Photo
Lauder Bridge (Eagle Bridge)				55°43′02″N 2°43′55″W	Category B	8204	Upload Photo
32 And 34 East High Street, Including Terrace Wall And Railings				55°43′05″N 2°44′42″W	Category C(S)	47661	Upload Photo
7 And 9 Factor's Park				55°43′06″N 2°44′50″W	Category C(S)	47665	Upload Photo
1-5 (Odd Nos) Mid Row, Including Bank Of Scotland				55°43′09″N 2°44′52″W	Category C(S)	47673	Upload Photo
3 The Row				55°43′18″N 2°45′07″W	Category B	47674	Upload Photo
7 The Row				55°43′18″N 2°45′07″W	Category C(S)	47675	Upload Photo
Allanbank Including Allanbank Cottage, Stables And Walled Garden				55°43′07″N 2°45′29″W	Category C(S)	50908	Upload Photo
43 West High Street				55°43′16″N 2°45′04″W	Category B	45581	Upload Photo
3-5 (Odd Nos) Market Place, Including Premises Of A & J Rutherford				55°43′11″N 2°44′56″W	Category C(S)	37207	Upload Photo
49 West High Street				55°43′16″N 2°45′05″W	Category C(S)	37220	Upload Photo
Edinburgh Road, War Memorial				55°43′17″N 2°45′14″W	Category B	37223	Upload Photo
12 The Loan And Adjoining Former Cottage				55°43′16″N 2°45′17″W	Category C(S)	47668	Upload Photo
Lauder Golf Club Pavilion				55°42′40″N 2°45′02″W	Category C(S)	51312	Upload Photo
4 The Avenue				55°43′14″N 2°44′56″W	Category C(S)	47654	Upload Photo
35 East High Street				55°43′08″N 2°44′46″W	Category C(S)	47656	Upload Photo
38 East High Street				55°43′03″N 2°44′34″W	Category C(S)	47662	Upload Photo
East High Street, Wyndhead Farm, Barn To North East (Parallel To East High Street) And Cart Shed Attached To Adjoining Block To South West Only				55°43′02″N 2°44′33″W	Category C(S)	47664	Upload Photo
61 West High Street				55°43′18″N 2°45′09″W	Category C(S)	47679	Upload Photo
Thirlestane Castle Estate, Stable Offices				55°43′03″N 2°44′28″W	Category B	51315	Upload Photo
Manse Road, The Glebe (Former Lauder Manse) Including Stable And Boundary Wall				55°43′01″N 2°45′17″W	Category B	6717	Upload Photo
8 East High Street				55°43′07″N 2°44′47″W	Category C(S)	47657	Upload Photo
40 East High Street Including Rear Wing And Courtyard				55°43′02″N 2°44′32″W	Category C(S)	47663	Upload Photo
Manse Road, Lodge At Entrance To Allanbank House, Including Railings				55°43′09″N 2°45′07″W	Category C(S)	47671	Upload Photo
47 West High Street				55°43′16″N 2°45′05″W	Category C(S)	47678	Upload Photo
East High Street, Wyndhead Stables Lodge				55°43′03″N 2°44′32″W	Category C(S)	51311	Upload Photo
Drummonds Hall, Bridge				55°43′37″N 2°43′51″W	Category B	13847	Upload Photo
Thirlestane Castle (Including Eagle Gates And Boundary Walls)				55°43′20″N 2°44′37″W	Category A	8203	Upload another image See more images
10 East High Street, Including Boundary Wall				55°43′06″N 2°44′47″W	Category C(S)	47658	Upload Photo
26 East High Street				55°43′06″N 2°44′43″W	Category C(S)	47659	Upload Photo
12 The Row				55°43′18″N 2°45′03″W	Category C(S)	47676	Upload Photo
19 West High Street				55°43′14″N 2°45′01″W	Category C(S)	47677	Upload Photo

== Key ==
The scheme for classifying buildings in Scotland is:

- Category A: "buildings of national or international importance, either architectural or historic; or fine, little-altered examples of some particular period, style or building type."
- Category B: "buildings of regional or more than local importance; or major examples of some particular period, style or building type, which may have been altered."
- Category C: "buildings of local importance; lesser examples of any period, style, or building type, as originally constructed or moderately altered; and simple traditional buildings which group well with other listed buildings."

In March 2016 there were 47,288 listed buildings in Scotland. Of these, 8% were Category A, and 50% were Category B, with the remaining 42% being Category C.
