= Lauder Town Hall =

Municipal building in Lauder, Scotland

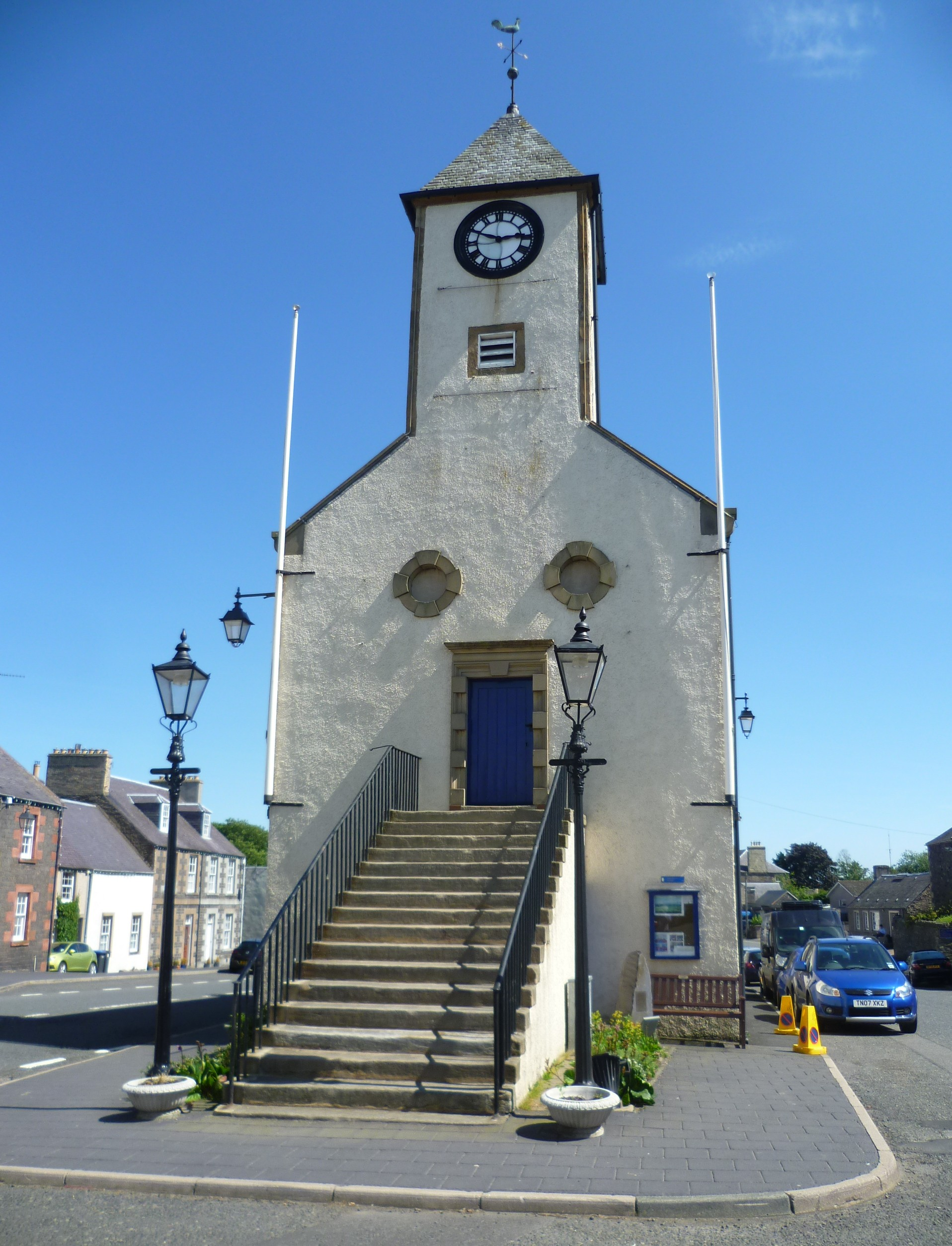
- Lauder Town Hall

- Shown in the Scottish Borders
- 55.7192°N 2.7481°W
- Location: Market Place, Lauder

History
- Built: 1735

Site notes
- Architectural style: Scottish medieval style

Listed Building – Category B
- Official name: Mid Row, Lauder Town Hall
- Designated: 9 June 1971
- Reference no.: LB37201

Lauder Town Hall is a municipal structure in the Market Place in Lauder, Scottish Borders, Scotland. The structure, which is used as the local registrar's office and as a venue for weddings and civil partnership ceremonies, is a Category B listed building.

== History ==
The first municipal in the town was a tolbooth which was designed in the Scottish medieval style and dated back at least to the mid-16th century. In 1598, it was attacked by an angry mob drawn from the Homes and Cranstoun families, led by Lord Home: they entered the tolbooth, retrieved and executed a prisoner, William Lawther, who was being held for the murder of one of their kinsmen, John Cranstoun, and then burnt the building to the ground. The building was burnt to the ground again and was subsequently repaired in 1606. A man and five women were held in the tolbooth, tried for witchcraft in the courtroom and then executed in October 1649 during the Great Scottish witch hunt.

By the late 1720s, the old tolbooth was dilapidated and the local laird, Charles Maitland, 6th Earl of Lauderdale, whose seat was at Thirlestane Castle, contributed £100 towards the rebuilding of the structure: it was rebuilt in stone with a harled finish and the works were completed in 1735. The design involved a long flight of steps leading up to a doorway with a Gibbs surround on the first floor. Above the doorway, there was a pair of blind oculi, with voussoirs at the cardinal points, and the whole structure was surmounted by a gable which was broken by a clock tower with a pyramid-shaped roof and weather vane. Internally, the principal rooms were two barrel vaulted prison cells on the ground floor as well one smaller, windowless cell known as the "black hole" underneath the staircase; there was a single large assembly hall, which was used both as a court room and as the burgh council chamber, on the first floor.

In 1790, a new bell, cast by George Watt of Edinburgh, was installed in the clock tower and, on 18 July 1793, during a severe and prolonged thunderstorm, a "ball of fire struck the steeple above the Tollbooth, and did considerable damage". In November 1831, a public meeting was held in the town hall to discuss the Reform Bill and to demand "speedy reform" and, following a critical report by a prisons inspector, the use of the prison cells for the incarceration of criminals was discontinued in 1843. A one-handed clock, which had been installed in the tower when the town hall was rebuilt in the 18th century, was relocated to a gable in a stable block at Mellerstain House in 1859: it was replaced by a new two-handed clock which was installed at the town hall at that time.

The future Prime Minister, Ramsay MacDonald, visited the town hall to make a speech in support of the local Labour Party candidate, Robert Spence during the December 1923 General Election. The building continued to serve as the meeting place of the burgh council for much of the 20th century but ceased to be the local seat of government when the enlarged Ettrick and Lauderdale District Council was formed in 1975. It was subsequently used as the local registrar's office and as a venue for weddings and civil partnership ceremonies.

== See also ==
- List of listed buildings in Lauder, Scottish Borders
