= Handyside Edgar =

Scottish physician

Dr Handyside Edgar (sometimes written Handasyde Edgar) FRSE (1754–1806) was a Scottish physician who settled in Jamaica as both a medical doctor and plantation owner. On his death a famous Scottish legal case was heard debating the legal responsibilities of debts raised in one country being settled in another.

He appears to have been a descendant of General Roger Handasyd an early governor of Jamaica. His more ancient ancestry can be traced back to Edgar of Wedderlie, who held lands from the Earls of Dunbar, during the reign of Malcolm III of Scotland.

== Life ==
He was born on 27 March 1754 in Hamilton, Lanarkshire, the son of Alexander Edgar of Auchingrammont (1698–1777) and his wife Margaret Edgar (a cousin). His father also owned Hillhousefield in south Leith and some records give this as his birthplace. He certainly spent a major part of his childhood in Leith.

He trained as a physician at Glasgow University graduating MA MD in 1776. He is noted as a college friend of Colin Lauder through which Lauder befriended his brother Alexander.

He moved to Jamaica with his brother in the late 18th century to run the Wedderlie Estate (named after his family home and probably established by their father), and the Osborne Estate (created around 100 years earlier by a Dr Osborne). He appears to have already had kinsfolk in Jamaica including several half-brothers and sisters fathered by Alexander Edgar with negro slaves. Handyside Edgar acted as a physician in both Trelawney and Montego Bay in Jamaica.

He was elected a Fellow of the Royal Society of Edinburgh in 1786. His proposers were John Robison, John Playfair, and Andrew Dalzell.

He died in Jamaica on 8 June 1806. He is buried there in St James Churchyard.

A dispute over his will, between his brother Alexander Edgar and Sir Simon Haughton Clarke was heard by the Court of Session in Edinburgh under Allan Maconochie, Lord Meadowbank in 1810. The case revolved around the legal responsibility of an English executor for a Scottish debt.

== Family ==
He married Mary Simpson of Bounty Hall, Jamaica on 6 March 1792 in Trelawny, Jamaica. She returned to Britain after his death and died in London on 13 July 1819.

His uncle, Peter Edgar, was father-in-law to Sir Henry Raeburn, his cousin Ann Edgar, being Raeburn's wife, and the two families mixed at social occasions.
