= Lauder Tower =

Castle in Scotland

- Lauder, Scottish Borders, Scotland

Site information
- Condition: No remains

Location
- Coordinates: 55.71936°N 2.74855°W

Site history
- Built: c.15th century

Lauder Tower was a 15th-century tower house located in Lauder, Scottish Borders, Scotland.

== History ==
Built by the Lauder family, the castle once stood near Lauder Church. Tower Garden is remembered as the locality where it once stood.

The tower was demolished between 1699 and 1701, with no above ground remains now evident. An old stone from the tower with the initials R.L is depicted in "The Grange of St. Giles, the Bass: And the Other Baronial Homes of the Dick-Lauder Family".

== Bibliography ==
- Coventry, Martin (2008). Castles of the Clans: The Strongholds and Seats of 750 Scottish Families and Clans. Cockenzie: Goblinshead.
- Smith, Jane Stewart (1898). The Grange of St. Giles, the Bass: And the Other Baronial Homes of the Dick-Lauder Family.
