= Battle of Nesbit Moor (1402) =

1402 battle of the Anglo-Scottish Wars

- Part of the Anglo-Scottish Wars
Date	22 June 1402
Location	Nesbit Moor 55°45′23″N 2°17′41″W
Result	English victory

Belligerents
Kingdom of Scotland	Kingdom of England

Commanders and leaders
Sir Patrick Hepburn †; Sir John Haliburton; Sir Robert Lauder	Earl of Dunbar & March

Strength
c. 400	c. 200

Casualties and losses
High	Low
- Battle location in Scotland

The Battle of Nesbit Moor (or Nisbet Muir) was a small but significant clash between Scottish and English forces in the borders area north of the River Tweed. Specifically this clash took place on the Kimmerghame Estate in a field now named Slaughter Field. The estate is in the possession of the Swinton Family.

In 1402, Scottish nobles launched a coordinated invasion of Northern England. In the initial foray, some 12,000 Scottish troops crossed into Cumberland and looted areas near Carlisle. On 22 June at Nisbet, Berwickshire, the forfeited George de Dunbar, 10th Earl of March successfully led 200 English soldiers, mainly drawn from the garrison at Berwick-upon-Tweed, against 400 Scots returning from a raid on Northumberland. Henry IV of England was given news of the skirmish while at Harborough on 30 June, and delayed plans to suppress a Welsh rebellion so that he could deal with the large-scale Scottish invasion that was then imminently expected. In the autumn a large army of Scots led by Archibald Douglas, 4th Earl of Douglas harassed the English countryside as far south as the River Wear, and were engaged and defeated in the battle of Humbleton Hill.

The Scottish casualties at Nesbit Moor included the death of Sir Patrick Hepburn younger of Hailes; and the capture of Sir John Haliburton of Dirleton, Robert de Lawedre of Edrington, Sir John Cockburn, and Sir Thomas Haliburton. The date of Sir Robert Lawder's liberation does not appear to be on record but as there is a charter in The Great Seal of Scotland (number 934) confirmed at Falkland Palace in May 1411, which mentions him being "present", we might safely assume that he was freed before that date. Certainly on 15 June 1411 "Robertus Lawedyr, miles" has a safe-conduct from Henry IV.
