= Alexander Lauder (bishop) =

Scottish bishop (died 1440)

Alexander de Lawedre (c. 1396 – 11 October 1440, in Edinburgh) was for the last five months of his life Bishop of Dunkeld, where he had previously been Archdeacon.

== Family ==
There is confusion amongst writers and copyists with his parentage, with some giving him as a son of Alan de Lawedre of Haltoun. However a contemporary Supplication and, later, Keith, give him as "brother-german" to William de Lawedre, Bishop of Glasgow. Alexander Lauder was a son of Sir Robert de Lawedre of Edrington (d.1425) by his spouse Annabella.

== Career ==
In 1413, he was still a student of Canon Law at the University of Paris, but was permitted to hold two incompatible benefices. In 1416 he had graduated as a Bachelor of Canon Law (B.C.L.) at which time he held the perpetual vicarage of Roxburgh, and the Archdeaconry of Dunkeld, when he was collated to the church at Ratho, then under the patronage of the Forresters, a daughter of whom had married (before 1408) Sir Alexander Lauder of Haltoun, Knt. By 1418 he was recorded as a Licentiate in Canon Law. In a Supplication recorded at Rome on 2 December 1420 it states: 'Nova proviso' (new provision) by (formerly, before his deposition), Peter de Luna (Avignon Pope Benedict XIII) who gave His mandate of provision of the parish church of Ratho, Diocese of St. Andrews, to Alexander de Lawedre, subdeacon of the said diocese, brother of the Bishop of Glasgow, Licentiate in Decrees of Paris and Archdeacon of Dunkeld, who obtained peaceable possession of same.

Alexander had at least four Safe-conducts issued to him to travel abroad. Joseph Bain mentions him in several issued by Henry VI and found also in Rotuli Scotiae on 13 May and 19 and 30 November 1423, which include "Alexander de Lawedre, archidiaconus Dunkelden in Scotia". With "Magr. Edwardus de Laweder, archidiaconus de Lothian" he is again mentioned on 4 March 1424–5.

In May 1440 he was nominated at the request of King James II of Scotland as Bishop of Dunkeld. On 6 June 1440, a papal provision to that post was made for him, in which he was described as "a venerable man who was notable in every kind of upright behaviour".

He died unexpectedly, and before his formal consecration, at Edinburgh on 11 October 1440, and was buried within the parish church of Lauder.
