= William Lauder =

William Lauder may refer to:

- William de Lauder (1380–1425), bishop of Glasgow
- William Lauder (poet) (1520?–1573), poet
- William Lauder (forger) (died 1771), forger
- William P. Lauder (born 1960), president and CEO of the Estée Lauder Companies Inc.
- William Lauder (priest) (died 1868), Anglican dean
- William Preston Lauder (1788–1850), Scottish physician
- William Waugh Lauder (1858–1931), Canadian pianist, music critic and lecturer
