= Robert Lauder of the Bass =

Scottish knight, armiger, and Governor of the Castle

Sir Robert Lauder of the Bass (before 1440 – c. January 1508) was a Scottish knight, armiger, and Governor of the Castle at Berwick-upon-Tweed. He was also a member of the old Scottish Parliament. The Lauders held the feudal barony of The Bass (the caput of which was its castle), East Lothian, Edrington Castle and lands in the parish of Mordington, Berwickshire, Tyninghame in Haddingtonshire, and numerous other estates and properties elsewhere in Scotland.

== Robert of Edrington ==
Lauder was the eldest son and heir of Robert Lauder of the Bass (d.1495) by his first spouse Jonet, daughter of Sir Alexander Home

Prior to his father's death, Lauder was usually designated "of Edrington" in Berwickshire. After his purchase of the lands of Biell, in East Lothian he was designated 'of Biel'.

In 1462 Berwick-upon-Tweed was recovered by the Scots and Lauder was put in charge of Berwick Castle, until he was succeeded in 1474 by David, Earl of Crawford. In 1464 Lauder was paid £20 for repairs to the castle.

A notarial instrument dated 13 May 1465 narrates:

[this] Robert Lauder, son and apparent heir of Sir Robert Lauder of Edrington, asserted that David Lauder of Popil (East Lothian) had given sasine and heritable possession to his eldest son James Lauder and Jonete his spouse, their heirs etc., of a certain piece of land at Popil, to the prejudice of the first-mentioned Robert, who solemnly protested that the said sasine should neither be valid nor prejudice his right in the land, and for greater security, he, by throwing of earth and stone outside the house belonging to the piece of land, and by breaking a plate with his foot, broke and annulled the said sasine and so possession by James Lauder and his wife. Done at Popil at 7 a.m. on 13th May 1465 before Henry Ogil of Popil, James Ogil his eldest son, and others.

"Robert de Laweder de Edryngtoun" is the first witness to a Retour of Service, dated 7 April 1467, of Margaret Sinclair as one of the heirs of her grandfather John Sinclair in the lands of Kimmerghame, Berwickshire. Although he was not yet in formal possession of the Edrington estate (see next entry below) he appears to be regularly using the designation, as eldest son, 'of Edrington'.

== Invested in Edrington ==
In a charter of 1471, James III of Scotland confirmed to Robert Lauder, son and heir apparent of Robert Lauder of Edrington and the Bass, the lands of Edrington and Coalstell with the fishings of Edermouth (or mouth of the Whiteadder Water) plus the mill there (at Edrington) which Robert the father personally resigned to Robert junior and his male heirs failing which those relations bearing the Lauder arms.

In a further charter signed at Edinburgh on 26 June 1474 and confirmed there on 27 July 1475, James III confirmed a feu charter of Robert Lauder junior, Lord of Edringtoun, and superior of West Nisbet, to David Creichtoun of Cranstoun and his heirs, of the lands of West Nisbet in the barony of Pencaitland, East Lothian, which John de Colquhoun of Luss has resigned into the said Robert Lauder junior's hands. Witnesses included Robert Lauder of Bass, father of said Robert junior, and a William Lauder.

== Governor of Berwick castle ==
King James III of Scotland again appointed Robert Lauder of Edrington as custodian and governor of the castle at Berwick-upon-Tweed for 5 years, with a retainer of 200 merks per annum.

In 1477 Robert was one of those entrusted by James III to escort the dowry of Princess Cecily of York for her planned marriage to James, Duke of Rothesay. Cecily was the third daughter of Edward IV of England and Elizabeth Woodville.

Bain records that on 2 February 1477: "James King of Scotland signifies to the bearers of the instalment of the Princess Cecilia's dower due at Candlemass, that he has sent Alexander, Lord Hume, Robert of Lawdir of Edrington son and heir apparent to Robert of Lawdir of the Bass, and Adam of Blackadder of that Ilk, with the Lord Lyon King of Arms, to conduct them to Edinburgh."

A charter of 1477 to Alexander Inglis of tenements of land in Hide Hill etc., in Berwick-upon-Tweed, lists those who own neighbouring properties, which include "Robert Lauder of Bass junior".

=== Other mentions ===
A Retour of Special Service was held at Berwick-upon-Tweed on 20 May 1477 serving Thomas Broun (of lawful age) as son and heir to John Broun (who has been dead three months), in a carucate of land with pertinents on the north side of Flemington, (near Eyemouth, Berwickshire), valued at four merks annually and held in chief of the Laird of Restalrig [near Edinburgh] and Flemington for service of ward and relief, such services being given as neighbouring tenants in these lands are accustomed to give. Retour given by Henry Congiltoun, Sheriff depute of Berwick. Amongst the jury was Robert Lawder of Edrington, Thomas Edingtoun of that Ilk, Thomas Lumsden of that Ilk, William Douglas, Archibald Manderston, John Skougall and William Lauder.

He witnessed a charter at the castle of Dunbar on 18 December 1475 as "Robert Lauder of Edrington". On 2 April 1486, a "Robert Lawedar" was one of the witnesses to document signed on the High Altar at Holyrood Abbey. As the leading witness was William Hall, Vicar of Baro, it is probable that this Robert is of the Bass family. Another witness was an Alexander Home.

In 1489 James IV of Scotland granted a charter to Lauder of the lands of Beil, Johnscleuch in the Lammermuir Hills, and "le Clyntis", with their towers and mills etc., in the Barony of Dunbar, formerly owned by Hugo de Dunbar & Beil, with the lands and mill of Mersington, Berwickshire, which Hugo de Dunbar of Bele also resigned. The charter mentions Robert's wife Isabel Hay.

The Exchequer Rolls record Robert Lauder of Edrington in possession of the lands of Glensax in Yarrow, Selkirkshire in 1489/1490/1491.

== Papal petition ==
A Petition to Pope Innocent VIII signed in the presence of Henry Congleton and others in January 1491, craved absolution for numerous people during the 'recent troubles' in Scotland and the Battle of Sauchieburn (11 June 1488). Lauder was named as son and heir of the Lord of Bass and Baron of Stenton. Others include Kentigern Hepburn of Waughtoun, Patrick Skowgale, Alexander Sidserf, William Sinclair, David Renton of Billie & Lamberton, Alexander Home, Archibald Dunbar, William Manderston, Gavin Home, and John Sommerville.

On 4 August 1494 in a court held at Stenton, before John Swinton of that Ilk, depute and lieutenant of John, Lord Glamis, and Robert Lord l'Isle, King's Justiciars generally constituted from the south side of the Forth; Robert Lauder of Bass showed a charter or writ of resignation by the deceased Gilbery Duchry mentioning that Gilbert resigned the land or tenement of Duchry (in the Lammermuir Hills), in the tenement of Stentoun, in the hands of Walter, Stewart of Scotland, superior thereof. Robert Lauder of Beil, son and apparent heir of the said Robert, asserted that a charter by his father to him of the mains of Stenton and three-quarters of the town and territory made no reservation of the lands of Duchry. The witnesses were Robert Laweder, son and apparent heir of Robert Lauder of Beill, James Cockburn of Clerkington, William Hepburn of Athelstaneford, Alexander Sydserf of that Ilk, James Ogill, David Ogill, and others.

== Death of father ==
Robert Lauder was granted sasine of Stenton, Garvald, and The Bass in 1495, and the lands of Symprin and Ladypart, near Lauder. This would normally occur upon the death of the head of the family.

A charter registered (but almost certainly signed much earlier) on 1 February 1497 records "Robert Lauder of Bass and Lord of Auldkathi to Robert Lauder his eldest son and Ysobella [sic] Hay his spouse, and their survivor of them, and their heirs male to be procreated of their bodies, of the lands of Auldkathi lying in the barony of Kynnele (Kinnoull) and sheriffdom of (Lin)Lithgow. Witnesses were William Hay of Menzen, William Hay of Tallo, Hugh of Dunbar, Gavin Lumsden, Thomas and Peter Wood and James Sinclair." The footnote states that the granter's seal is in fair condition.

== Visit of James IV ==
In 1497 King James IV visited the Bass. The boatmen who conveyed him from Dunbar were paid 14 shillings. Robert was knighted after January 1497 but before July 1498, so probably on the occasion of the King's visit to the Bass.

== Legal transactions ==
On 10 July 1498, he raised an action as assignee to the deceased David Dunbar of Bele [Beil], heir of the deceased Alexander Dunbar of Biel, against Mungo Home, son and heir of the deceased John Home of Whiterig, Berwickshire, and Margaret Hume his mother, for postponing and delaying to resign the 12 merk lands of the west end of Mersington, Berwickshire, with pertinents, "land on the west half of the burne" and keeping the charters and muniments thereof. The defenders did not appear. The Lords discern them to conform to the reversion produced, and assign 15 January next to the pursuer to prove the value of damages and violated profits and duties.

In July 1501 there was a dispute between Jonet, prioress of the Convent of Haddington, (represented by David Balfour of Caraldstone) and Robert Lauder of the Bass, knight, regarding the lands and chapellany of Garvald, East Lothian, and also damage made to Lauder's house at Whitecastle (or Nunraw) near Haddington. At the second hearing Robert was present in person. The case was referred to Patrick Hepburn, 1st Earl of Bothwell, for his consideration and adjourned until 15 October 1501.

The King confirmed a charter signed on the Bass on 12 July 1502 of Gavin Dunbar of Wester Spott to Robert Lawdir of Bass of the lands of Wester Spott, Gryndanehede and The Newkis in Haddingtonshire, reserving the usual liferents for the granter. Witnesses included Alexander Sydserf of that Ilk, Henry Congiltoun of that Ilk, and Kentigern Hepburn of Lufnes [and Waughtoun].

Subsequent to that, on 3 January 1503/1504, Gavin Dunbar of Wester Spott renounced his liferent interest in those properties, the renunciation 'done in the burgh of Edinburgh, in the tenement of Mr.Richard Lawson of Hierriggs, in his close thereof.' Letters of Procuratory were signed at Beil on 6 August 1504, by Robert Lawder addressed to James IV informing him that he (Robert) had appointed Richard Lawson of Hieriggs, Lord Justice Clerk, James Henderson and Richard Bothwell, John Homyll and David Anderson, as procurators, for resigning his lands of Wester Spott, Gryndenhede, and 'le Snyke,' with pertinents, into the hands of the King as superior.

Patrick Scougal of that Ilk had a tack [lease] of a quarter of the lands of Auldhame, near North Berwick, from George Home of Spott, with an agreement that it would later be feued to him. Agreed and signed at Beil on 26 September 1504, with Sir Robert Lawedir of the Bass one of the witnesses.

Lauder owned property on the High Street of Edinburgh, mentioned in a letter of reversion dated 16 April 1505 by Mr John of Murray, burgess of Edinburgh to William of Todrig, burgess of Edinburgh, of an annual rent of 40s Scots out of the houses and land called "the paintit chalmer" with the pertinents lying in the said burgh on the north side of the King's Street between the lands of Sir William Lindsay on the east part and the land of the Archbishop of Glasgow on the west part and the land of William Halkerstoune [Haxton] on the south part and the land of Sir Robert Lauder of the Bass on the north part.

== Pilgrimage ==
In 1506 Sir Robert Lauder of the Bass went on a pilgrimage to pray at the shrine of St.John of Amiens, accompanied by a large retinue of family and friends.

On 10 May 1506, at Edinburgh, "A Lettre of Licence [was] maid to Robert Lawder of the Bass, knycht, his men, servandis, and inhabitantis his landis, Robert Lawder, his son and apperand aire, John Swyntoun of that ilk, Johne Swytoun, his son and apperand aire, Robert Lawder of the Tower of Lawder, Alexander Cockburn of Newhall, Gilbert Wauchop in Howstoun, Alexander Sideserff of that Ilk, George Lile of Stonypath (nr. Garvald), David Lawder of Popill, Johne Forestare of Gammilschelis, Henry Congiltoun of that ilk, Thomas Wod of the Grange, William Gibson and Peter Wod in Akansid, and als all the saidis Robertis and thare tennandis, familiaris, servandis, procuratoris, attornais, factouris and intromettouris, and all and sundri his and thare gudis, rentis, possessionis, annuellis, fermez, etc., for the passing of the said Robert to Sanct Johne of Ameas [Amiens], in his pilgrimage, and uther partis bezond sey in his erandis: And Als respittis him and all the persounis above written, thair tennandis, etc., for all actiounis concernyn the kingis grace, etc., to ceis fra the day of the date hereof quhill his hamecummyn and forty dayis thairefter: And attour exempand the said Robert and all the persouns abone writtin fra the compering to ony parliamentis, justice-airis, chawmerlane-aires schireff courtis and ony uther courtis for ony maner of actiouns concernyn the kingis grace enduring the tyme forsaid." It seems clear that those named in this License have feus of certain properties from Sir Robert. Certainly Popill, and Newhall [Lothians], were owned by the lairds of Bass. What is also clear is that the Robert Lauder at Lauder Tower, Berwickshire, is not the son and heir of Sir Robert Lauder of the Bass, but a separate entity.

A Letter of Licence was given to Lauder to [give?] 'analy' [annually?] four merks worth of land of aul [old] extent of his lands of Ladypart, lying in the bailiary of Lawderdale, sheriffdom of Berwick, to what person or persons he pleases. Dated at Edinburgh 27 October 1506.

On 1 February 1508 Sasine was granted to his son, also Robert, of the Bass and other holdings. It is assumed Sir Robert died shortly before this date.

== Marriage and descendants ==
Robert Lauder married sometime before 1489 Isabella Hay, daughter of John Hay, 1st Lord Hay of Yester. She was a descendant of Robert The Bruce, and a great-great granddaughter of Robert III.

Of their children:

- Sir Robert Lauder of the Bass (d. 1517/18), who was made keeper of Lochmaben Castle in March 1512.
- William Lauder, from whom descend the Belhaven and West Barns branch of this family including Sir Robert Lauder of Beilmouth.
- Agnes Lauder, who married Alexander Cockburn of Newhall.
- Elizabeth Lauder, married before October 1506, David Renton of Billie, & Lamberton.
- Margaret, married (1) before September 1498, Kentigern Hepburn of Waughton and Lufness (d. July 1519), (2) 23 January 1521 (date of Papal Dispensation) Alexander Hume of Polwarth, Berwickshire, who died May 1532 when she was still living.
