= George Lauder of the Bass =

Sir George Lauder of the Bass, Knight (died 27 June 1611, on the Bass Rock), was a cleric, Privy Counsellor, and Member of the Scottish Parliament. He was a legal tutor to Prince Henry.

== Family ==
The earliest mention of George Lauder appears to be in 1542 in a re-confirmation made by Cardinal David Beaton of the grant of another feu of the lands and barony of Tyninghame to his father, Robert Lauder of the Bass (died 1576), in which George is listed as the fourth child of Robert, by his first wife, Margaret, daughter of Sir Oliver Sinclair of Roslin, knight.

== Parson of Auchindoir ==
Lauder entered the Church, and some deeds and sasines refer to him as Master George Lauder, Rector of Auldcathie in West Lothian.

On 22 October 1561, Master George Lauder, legitimate son of Robert Lauder of Bas, was issued with a Presentation of the Canonicature and Prebendary of Auchindoir in the diocese of Aberdeen, to be Rector and Vicar of Auchindoir, upon the resignation and demission of his uncle, Master John Sinclair, Dean of Restalrig, (his uncle). The Books of the Thirds of Benefices record that the third was calculated by Master John Stewart, in the name and on behalf of Master John Sinclair and Master George Lauder. John Sinclair held the parsonage of Auchindoir at the Reformation and demitted it in October 1561 in favour of George Lauder. Sinclair was Dean of Restalrig, between 1542 and 1566.

On 21 September 1568 George Lauder, parson of Auchindoir, was given the gift of the escheat of the goods of his father Robert Lauder of Bass, who had failed to appear 'at the horn' and for not finding surety to compear before the Justice or his deputies in the Tolbooth of Edinburgh to underlie the law for taking part with Archibald Campbell, 5th Earl of Argyll, Claude Hamilton and others at the battle of Langside in support of Mary, Queen of Scots.

== Becomes laird ==
George's three elder brothers all predeceased him and so he became laird of Bass.

There is a certified copy of a Retour in favor of George Lauder of Bass, as heir to James Lauder of Bass, his brother, in the lands of Marsintoun (Mersington) and other lands in Berwickshire and East Lothian, dated 1580. A Special Retour was granted to Mr. George Lauder, eldest surviving son and heir to Robert Lauder of the Bass in the patronage and lands of Auldcathie in West Lothian, dated 7 November 1580. His elder brother James had also been a cleric, the Dean of Restalrig, and was murdered by a cousin. George Lauder of Bass was awarded the escheat of the goods of "Walter Lauder, son lawful of the deceased Alexander Lawder of Umboquhy [Ummachie], convicted, become in will, fugitive or at the horn for not compearing to underlie the laws for the slaughter of James Lawder of Bass, committed within his (James's) awin place of Beil on 4th October last, or throw being justifiet thairfoir" on 16 December 1580. Walter was subsequently executed for this crime.

On 15 August 1583, a Precept was made to George Lauder of the Bass, as son and heir of Robert Lauder of Bass, of a Temple-land in "Lewinsbrig" (Leven's bridge) in Fife, a Temple-land in North Berwick, and a Temple-land in Tyninghame. Also, as brother and heir of James Lauder of Bass, the Temple-land of Innerwick, East Lothian.

A Precept of Clare Constat, in favour of Mr. George Lauder, as heir to his brother the deceased Mr. James Lauder, in the lands of Panschlis, Preistlaw, Kingsyd, Freirdykis, Winterscheills, and Newgrange, in the constabulary of Haddington and shire of Edinburgh, was signed on 21 May 1584, at 'Cumre'.

In 1590 he appears in a Privy Council list of landed men or landlords in East Lothian.

Other possessions are described in a decree of taxation, at instance of George Lauder of Bass, against James, Commendator of Melrose Abbey, for the feu lands of Grangemuir, Preistlaw, Preistheillis, Kingis Syd, Freir Dykis and Winter Scheildykis, dated 25 July 1584.

A charter in the Parliamentary Acts & records dated circa 1609 records a "chartor maid by umqle George Archbishop of St. Andrews to umqle Mr George Lauder of Bass and his airs Off all and haill the landis of Scony (Scoonie), Monflowrie, Bambeith threipland, Levin porte and heavin of Levin And of the toun and baronie of Levin customes and dewties belanging thairto, Mylnes, milnelandis, multoris and fischingis Off the water of Leven, Fife; And off the vther liberties priuiledges and donatiounis mentionat in the said chartor and disponit to the said Mr George Lauder and his aires heretablie."

== Royal favor ==
In 1581 King James VI of Scotland visited the Bass Rock and was so enamoured of it that he offered to buy the island, a proposition which did not commend itself to George Lauder. The King appears to have accepted the situation with good grace. George was a Privy Counsellor – described as the King's "familiar councillor" – and tutor to the young Prince Henry.

On 13 January 1587 George Lauder of the Bass, with John Maitland of Thirlestane and eight other "Barons of Lothian", subscribed to a voluntary grant of a subsidy to "defray the expenses to be incurred in aid of Queen Mary in her present peril" (at Fotheringay Castle).

George Lauder of Bass was commissioned by the Privy Council of Scotland on 20 July 1588, to collect a 20 shillings tax from every small baron or freeholder in Haddingtonshire, within 15 days, for the repair of Edinburgh Castle.

He was knighted on 17 May 1590, at the coronation of Anne of Denmark.

== Public life ==
Lauder was appointed a Commissioner for Parliament by the Privy Council on 24 May 1589.

On 5 June 1592 the Privy Council of Scotland was reconstituted. Under "Barons, Knights, and Gentlemen" appears George Lauder of the Bass. He was present on that day and sat also on Council on 8 June. In July he was present at every sitting and was one of the seven Privy Counsellors who denounced James Scott of Balwearie, Martine of Cardone, and Lumsden of Airdrie as rebels, to be arrested for their involvement in "the late treasonable act committed by Earl of Bothwell at Falkland Palace".

George Lauder, the laird of Bass, was a minor baron in parliament in 1592, and a convenor of parliament in 1593, 1594, 1597, 1598, 1599 & 1605. The General Index to the Acts of the Parliaments of Scotland states that:

the Laird of Bass appeared at the calling of suits in 1579; George Lauder of Bass was on the Privy Council in 1592 & 1593; was on the Articles in 1592; was a commissioner for punishing slayers of solan geese and other birds on the Bass Rock in 1592; had the lordship and bailiary of Tyninghame, with the office of heritable justiciar, and erection of the town into a free burgh of barony and regality, ratified to him in 1593; was in a Convention at Linlithgow in 1593, at Holyrood in 1593, 1596, 1598, at Edinburgh 1594, 1596; was in Parliament 1593, 1594, 1596, 1598; was a Commissioner on Petitions in 1593, on Meal, 1598, and on the coin, 1599.

On 11 December 1599, Sir George Lauder of Bass was one of the barons present at a Convention of the Estates at Holyroodhouse.

== Marriage ==
A charter under the Great Seal of Scotland of 7 February 1588/9, granted George the lands and lordship of Poppil and Wester Spott (then tenanted by Andrew Brown and Thomas Watson). George had resigned the lands the previous day for a regrant in view of his forthcoming marriage to Isobel Hepburn, the eldest daughter of Sir Patrick Hepburn of Waughton, knight, by his wife Isobel, daughter of John Haldane of Gleneagles.

An anonymous letter to the Lord Treasurer of England and Sir Francis Walsingham dated 7 February 1589/90 mentions the Laird of Bass's well attended marriage in Fife. The Duke of Lennox and Francis Stewart, 1st Earl of Bothwell attended, as a result of this event Edinburgh was left with few Privy Counsellors.

== Death ==
On 18 February 1612, the Testament dative (Will) and inventory "of an honourable and discreet man, George Lauder of the Bass in the Constabulary of Haddington, who died on 27 June 1611, faithfully made", was given up (registered) by Isobel Hepburn, Lady Bass, his widow and by George Lauder now of the Bass, only lawful child to the defunct and executor dative appointed to his father. Total value of the inventoried goods was £29175.9s.2d., with debts due to the deceased of £3045.14s.2d. The cautioner was Sir James Foulis of Collinton.

His son George Lauder became the last Lauder laird of the Bass, and after almost 600 years of the family's possession, gave up his right to the Bass Rock in 1626.<

== Seal ==
The seal of "George Lauder of the Bass, A.M., – a griffin sergeant within the royal "treasure" and originally appended to a charter of the mill of Mersington etc., in the parish of Eccles, Berwickshire, to James Maitland of Lethington on 21 February 1603, is on record.
