= Robert de Lawedre of Edrington =

Sir Robert de Lawedre (Lauder) of Edrington & The Bass, Knt., (died 1425) was a Burgess of Edinburgh and a confidant of King Robert III and sometime Guardian of his son, the future James I of Scotland.

== Family ==
The eldest son of Alan de Lawedre of Whitslaid, and Haltoun by his spouse Alicia, daughter of Sir Colin Campbell of Lochow, Argyll, progenitor of the Earls of Argyll. Alan de Lauder was dead by 20 March 1407 when Robert is recorded as executor testamenti quondam Alani de Lawedre patris sui nuper defuncti.

As Alan de Lawedre's eldest son and, so, the eldest grandson of Sir Robert de Lawedre of The Bass he was placed in fee by his grandfather in the feudal barony of The Bass and its lands, as well as the castle of Edrington, Berwickshire, and that estate. Because of his father's longevity, he continued to be often referred to as "of Edrington", even after he was placed in fee of The Bass.

== Early years ==
The Rotuli Scotiae records a safe-conduct dated 4 November 1364, from King Edward III of England to 'Robertus, fils [son] of Alani de Lawedre'. This would indicate that Robert was by now at least a page if not a young adult. Before 1370 Robert was a witness, with his father Alan, to a charter granted by Alan's father, also Sir Robert.

In a charter of 1384 Sir Robert is mentioned as Lord Justice of Scotland, and in a charter that year by Richard Edgar to Robert Edgar of Wedderlie, "Robertus Lawider Dominus de la Basse" appears as a witness and

== Campaigns ==
Froissart mentions "Sir Robert Lauder, a renowned hero" as having been present at the Battle of Otterburn which took place on 19 August 1388.

Rymer's Foedera records that Robert de Lawdre was one of the sureties for the Earl of Douglas's bounds on the Middle March during a meeting at 'Haudenstank' between English and Scottish Commissioners on 26 October 1398, to discuss the return of prisoners and ransoms and "the due observance of the truce".

Sir Robert Lauder of The Bass took part in the Battle of Nesbit Moor on 22 June 1402, and was captured.

== Mentions ==
A Notarial Instrument of Adam Hepburn Lord of Hailes dated 23 March 1417, refers to a Letters Patent of the late Margaret, Countess of Mar, signed and dated at Tantallon Castle on 10 December 1389, and read out in the church of the Friars Minors of Haddington in the presence of Sir Robert Maitland of Thirlestane, Sir Robert de Lowedir, Lord of the Bass, Sir Alexander de Cockburn Lord of Langtoun, all knights, and others.

'Roberto de Lawedre, knight', is a witness to a charter to Coldingham Priory confirming them in all of their ancient possessions, signed at Linlithgow on 2 January 1391–2. Robert de Lawedir, Lord of The Bass, is one of the nobles who witnessed a charter by James de Sandilands, Lord of Calder, to George Douglas, 1st Earl of Angus, circa 1397; also in 1397 this Robert received an annuity from the Customs of Haddington. Sir Robert de Lawedir, knight, with Sir Patrick de Hepburn, knight, Sir William de St.Clair, knight, and others, witnessed a charter by Archibald Douglas, 3rd Earl of Douglas & Lord of Galloway, to Sir John de Swinton, knight, his heirs and successors, of the lands of Pitcocks, East Lothian, dated and sealed at Dunbar 20 October 1401.

There is a charter in The Great Seal in May 1411, which mentions Sir Robert de Lawedre being 'present', and on 15 June 1411, "Robertus Lawedyr, miles" has a safe-conduct from King Henry IV of England to travel to England.

Reid [1885] states that "Sir Robert Lauder de Bass received payments from the customs of North Berwick in 1413, 1414, 1415 and 1420", and in 1420 he was appointed Auditor of the Burgh & Baillie Accounts for the Exchequer.

He was frequently in England or passing through it. A Safe-Conduct was issued by King Henry VI of England to Robert de Lawedre, George de Lawedre and Gilbert de Lawedre (his brothers), "at present in England" to travel to Scotland, dated 4 December 1423.

== James I of Scotland ==
In 1405 King Robert III of Scotland, apprehensive of danger to his son James (afterwards James I) from Robert Stewart, Duke of Albany, placed the youthful prince in the safe custody of his friend Sir Robert Lauder in his secure castle on The Bass prior to embarkation for safer parts on the continent. This story is recounted in Wyntown's "Cronykil".

Murdoch Stewart, Duke of Albany, the Governor of Scotland, signed a Commission dated 19 August 1423 for his named Ambassadors, one of whom was "Sir Robert de Lawedre of Edrington, Knight", to treat for the liberation of King James I of Scotland. These Ambassadors are recorded present in the Chapter House at York on 10 September with the King's ransom of £40,000 sterling and to sign the treaty of liberation. Lauder's signet is attached to that treaty.

On 3 February 1424, Sir "Robertus de Lawedre de Bass, chevalier", with 18 men, had a safe-conduct with a host of other noblemen etc., as a hostage for King James I of Scotland at Durham.

Tytler states that Sir Robert Lauder of Bass "was one of the few people whom King James I admitted to his confidence. [Upon his return to Scotland] James consolidated his own power amongst a portion of the barons. The Earl of Mar, and his son Sir Thomas Stewart, William de Lauder, Bishop of Glasgow and Lord Chancellor of Scotland, Sir Walter Ogilvy, Lord High Treasurer, John Cameron, Provost of the Collegiate Church of Lincluden and private secretary to the King, Sir John Forester of Corstorphine, Lord Chamberlain, Sir John Stewart, and Sir Robert Lauder of the Bass - a firm friend of the King".

In 1424 when King James I returned from his long captivity in England, he at once consigned to the castle of The Bass Walter Stewart, the eldest son of Murdoch Stewart, Duke of Albany, his cousin. The person who received the payments for the prisoner's support was Sir Robert Lauder.

A Warrant was issued at the request of James I dated 4 March 1425 for this Robert and others to travel to Bruges to sue for money due to the Scottish Crown.

Sir Robert Lauder of Bass appears to have been dead before 14 June 1425, the paternal inheritance being confirmed to his son, Sir Robert de Lawedre de Edringtoun, Knt., on 14 December that year.

== Marriage ==
A Donation Charter of Robert de Lawedre confirmed by Robert Stewart, Duke of Albany to Glasgow Cathedral dated 28 September 1414, contains information on Robert and some of his family as several of his sons bore witness* to the charter. He married Annabella (family unknown) who was then still alive. They had known issue:

1. William de Lauder, Bishop of Glasgow & Lord Chancellor of Scotland until death.
2. John de Lauder (d.1421), whose daughter Mariotta married Sir Alexander Home of that Ilk.(Witness*)
3. Sir Robert de Lawedre, Knt., of Edrington & The Bass (d. before Michaelmas 1451).(Witness*)
4. James de Lawedre, Justice-Clerk South of the Forth, (d. before 7 August 1432)(Witness*)
5. Alan de Lawedre of that Ilk, (d. after October 1464) of Lauder Tower.(Witness*)
6. Gilbert de Lawedre, (d. after 22 October 1471), "armiger" and Baillie of Lauder, who married before 1420 Annabella, daughter of Sir Robert Maitland of Thirlestane & Lethington, the God-daughter of Gilbert's mother.(Witness*)
7. Patrick de Lawedre, (d. after 1444) heir to his brother George.
8. George Lauder, Bishop of Argyll (d. after March 1466).
9. Daughter who married Patrick Cockburn of Clerkington, East Lothian (c1388 - 1449).
