= Robert Lauder of Quarrelwood =

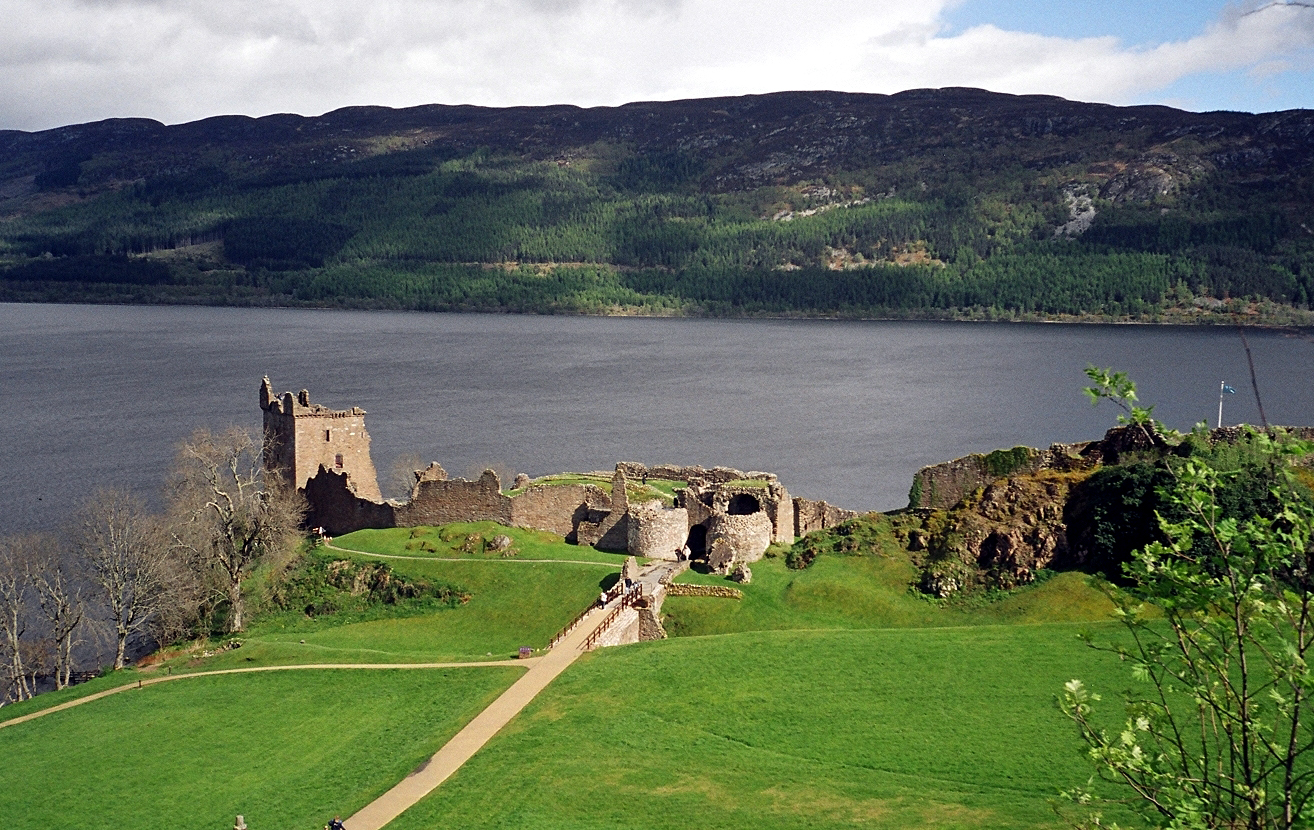
Urquhart Castle

Sir Robert de Lawedre (Lauder), Knt., of Quarrelwood, Edrington, and the Bass (died about 1370) was Justiciar of Scotia, a Scottish soldier of great prominence and Captain of Urquhart Castle. He is recorded by Fordun, in his Scotichronicon, and in Extracta ex variis Cronicis Scocie as "Robertus de Lavedir 'the good'"

== Early mentions ==
The eldest son of Sir Robert de Lawedre of the Bass (d. September 1337) by his wife Elizabeth (d. before 1358), he was probably born about 1310 and is described in Rymer's Foedera (vol.iii, p. 1022) as the eldest son of Sir Robert de Lawedre, one of the Scottish Ambassadors in 1323 who had been sent to negotiate peace with England. This Robert fils was attached to the train as a page.

In a charter in the Calendar of the Laing Charters, A.D. 854–1837 (page 10, number 32) there is a Precept originally written in Norman-French by Patrick de Dunbar, Earl of March, to Sir Robert de Lawedre, younger, (le fitz) for heritable sasine of the reversion of the lands of Whitelaw within the Earldom of Dunbar, plus 10 livres yearly from the mill of Dunbar, and the farms and issues of the granter's said town ('ville') of Dunbar, according to the terms of charters to the grantee. Dated at Berwick-upon-Tweed, 20 October 1324.

== Career and estates ==
In 1328, Robert Lauder was appointed Justiciary of 'that part of Scotland on the North side of the Water of Forth,' his main estate being close to Elgin in the province of Moray. The Exchequer Rolls record that "Roberto de Lawedir de Moravia, knight", received annual fees in 1329. On 1 October 1363, King David II confirmed a pension of £20 per annum upon the ageing "Robert de Lawedre, militi".

Lachlan Shaw writes "the first proprietor of Quarrelwood, of whom we have any distinct account, is Sir Robert Lauder or Lavedre. His father, also Sir Robert, was Justiciary of Lothians, and Ambassador to England in the time of King Robert Bruce, and engaged in similar service for King David Bruce. Both father and son seem to have been present at the battle of Halidon Hill, on 20 July 1333, after which fatal event the younger Sir Robert, being Justiciary of the North, hastened to occupy the Castle of Urquhart on Loch Ness, one of the few fortalices which held out against the power of Edward I of England. He held the lands of Quarrelwood, Grieshop, Brightmoney, and Kinsteary, which continued to be possessed by his descendants, in the female line, for many generations. He designated himself as 'Robertus de Lavadre, Dominus de Quarrelwood, in Moravia.' This Robert Lauder obtained a charter from John Pilmore, Bishop of Moray, for good services, of the half davoch [a davoch was at least 416 acres] lands of Aberbreachy, and the lands of Auchmunie, within the Barony of Urquhart, dated at Elgin in the feast of St. Nicholas, 1333. He founded a chaplianry in the Cathedral Church of Moray for his own soul, and those of his ancestors and successors. The Deed is dated at Dunfermline, 1 May 1362, which gift is confirmed by a Writ from King David Bruce, dated at Elgin, the 10 May, in the 38th year of his reign. Sir Robert is said to have had a family of sons and daughters. One daughter was married to Sir Robert Chisholm, and her father conveyed to her, or her husband, in her right, the lands of Quarrelwood, Kinsteary, Brightmoney and others."

Sir William Fraser, as well as the Scalacronica (p. 161), mention "Robert de Lawder the younger" being captured near Jedburgh in a skirmish between his party led by Sir Andrew de Moray and Archibald Douglas when they ambushed the party of Edward Baliol, in 1332.

James Young states that this Robert Lauder fought alongside Archibald Douglas during the battle of Halidon Hill, and quotes a MS Chronicle of England describing the battle. He also cites Wyntoun's Orygynale Cronykil of Scotland, written before 1424.

Bain lists Scots who have been forfeited of properties by King Edward III between 1335 – 1337. Robert de Lawedre fils has forfeited the dower lands in Paxton, Berwickshire which his daughter Mariotta then held from him, the "villa" [town] of Whitelaw, East Lothian, and half the domain lands of Stenton (where he is described as his father's son and heir), the other half being retained by his mother Elizabeth. Bain also has a charter dated circa 1335 which mentions numerous properties in and around Berwick-upon-Tweed which Robert the Bruce had granted to Sir Robert de Louwedere (another spelling in the same charter is Lowedre) senior, and his son Robert. Berwick having now fallen into the hands of the English, Robert de Lawedre junior is forfeited of these properties which are granted by Edward III of England to Adam of Corbridge. His father having died, young Lauder was also forfeited, in 1337, of his paternal inheritance: the lands of "Balmegon" (Balgone), "Balnegog", Wester Crag [Craig], Garvald, Fanulton (Fenton), Newhall, Popil, all in Haddingtonshire, and lastly Auldcathy in Linlithgowshire.

The Exchequer Rolls of Scotland have "Domini Roberti de Lawedre" in 1337 as the owner of lands in Inverness-shire, and Forres. They included "Dreketh", and "Banchori".

"Sir Robert de Lawedre, Justiciar of Scotland on the north side of the water of Forth" was present at the siege of Falkland Castle in February 1337 when he was one of the witnesses to a charter by Duncan (or Donnchadh IV, Earl of Fife,1288–1353), to Dame Beatrix de Douglas, widow of Sir Archibald de Douglas, knight, (presumably he who fell at Halidon Hill), of the barony of Wester Caldor, for life, and after her death to her sons and heirs by Sir Archibald.

About 1340, Robert de Lawder, Justiciary, was a witness, with James Lord Douglas, Robert de Keith, Henry St.Clair, Alexander de Seaton, all knights, plus the "Lord" William, Rector of the parish of Morham, East Lothian, to a charter of Euphemia, the widow of Sir John Giffard, Lord of Yester, relating to the tenement of land of "Barow" (today: Bara, East Lothian).

Robert Lauder was also at the Battle of Neville's Cross and was mentioned, with others in December 1346, as being taken prisoner there.

== Last mention ==
A charter mentions Sir Robert Lauder gave land "in and near his burgh of Lauder" to Thomas de Borthwick, witnessed by John de Mauteland [Maitland], the sixth of the Lauderdale family. This transaction was possibly in 1370 and John Maitland's brother William was a witness. The charter was attested by Sir Robert Lauder 's son, Alan, and his grandson, "Roberto filio Alani tunc Ballio de Lawedre".

== Children ==
Sir Robert's wife is unknown. However, there are records of at least five children, three boys and two girls:

- William de Lawedre, 'senior', of Burgh Muir, Edinburgh, who died without issue in 1375 when his brother Alan was retoured his heir.
- Alan de Lawedre, of Whitslaid (Berwickshire), and of Haltoun House (d. before March 1406/7 when his son Robert was retoured his heir).
- Hector de Lawedre, "armiger de Scot" received safe-conducts from King Edward III on 20 May 1365 and 14 October 1366 (on the latter date accompanied by seven associates) to travel to England. As no other Lauder family than this are on record as armigers at this period of time it is assumed that Hector must belong here.
- Mariotta de Lawedre, mentioned as "filia Roberti de Lowedre" living in a tenement [of land] at Paxton (possibly at Edrington) of which Robert is being forfeited by the English, 1335–36.
- Ann de Lawedre, who married Sir Robert Chisholm, originally from Roxburghshire, and upon whom her father settled much of his northern lands as dowry. In the archives is a charter of Robert de Lauedre, Knt., in favour of Robert de Chesholm of that ilk of lands, rents, etc., belonging to Lauedre, dated 27 July 1366.

Legal offices
Preceded by Uncertain, last known were Reginald Cheyne, John de Vaux, Robert Keith and William Inge	Justiciar of Scotia c. 1328–1370	Succeeded by Uncertain

== Bibliography ==
- Dictionary of the Peerage & Baronetage of the British Empire, by John Burke, 8th edition. London, 1845, volume 1, p. 591.
- Exchequer Rolls, 1264–1359, edited by John Stuart, LL.D., and George Burnett, LL.D., Lord Lyon King of Arms, Edinburgh, 1878, vol. 1, pp. 218, 440.
- History of the Province of Moray, by Lachlan Shaw, 3 vols., Glasgow, 1882.
- Historical References to the Scottish Family of Lauder, edited by James Young, Glasgow, 1884.
- Douglas Book, by Sir William Fraser, Edinburgh, 1885, vol. 1, p. 204; vol.3, pp. 391-2.
- Calendar of Documents Relating to Scotland, 1307–1357, edited by Joseph Bain, vol.III, Edinburgh, 1887, pp. 218-9, 337-8, 346, 386, 391.
- Grange of St. Giles, by J.Stewart-Smith, Edinburgh, 1898, pp. 159, 161, 165.
- Calendar of Writs preserved at Yester House 1166–1625, compiled by Charles C.H.Harvey and John MacLeod, Scottish Record Society, Edinburgh, 1930, p. 19, no. 24.

[[Category::Justiciars of Scotia]]
