= William Preston Lauder =

Scottish physician

William Preston Lauder FRSE FRCPE FRCSE (1788 – 1 April 1850) was a Scottish physician, specialising in obstetrics.

== Life ==
Lauder was born at the family home on Carrubbers Close, off the Royal Mile in Edinburgh around 1788, the son of Dr Colin Lauder and one of 10 children to his first wife, Margaret Milne. He was educated at the High School in Edinburgh and attended the University of St Andrews to study medicine, rather than the University of Edinburgh possibly to avoid any claim of discrimination. He gained his MD in 1809.

He returned to Edinburgh as a physician also acting as Physician-Accoucheur to the Edinburgh New Town Dispensary. At that time he also lectured on midwifery and the "Diseases of Women and Children" at Surgeon Square.

In 1819 he was elected a member of the Harveian Society of Edinburgh. In 1825 he was elected a Fellow of the Royal Society of Edinburgh, his proposer being a cousin, Thomas Dick Lauder. He resigned in 1839 largely due to his relocation to London.

In 1828 he was living at 91 Sloane Street in London, and had properties in Edinburgh, Cupar, Reading and Wallingford. In June 1831 he was living at 22 Sloane Street, and was involved in a forgery case being tried at the Old Bailey where Joseph Backler obtained £5 from Lauder's shopkeeper neighbour, Eden Bowler, using a cheque in Lauder's name. Backler was found guilty and sentenced to death, however his sentence was later commuted to imprisonment.

He died at his home at 8 Sloane Street in London on 1 April 1850 (some accounts state 1852). On his death he bequeathed several portraits to his eldest niece.

== Family ==
He married Harriet Dalmer, daughter of General Harry Dalmer, and sister of Lieutenant General Thomas Dalmer. They had no children. His wife died at Sloane Street in February 1861.
