= Robert Lauder of Popill =

Scottish landowner and adherent of Mary, Queen of Scots

Sir Robert Lauder of Popill (died April 1575) was a Scottish landowner and an adherent of Mary, Queen of Scots.

== Family ==
He was the eldest son and heir of Robert Lauder of the Bass and Margaret Sinclair. He is first mentioned in a feu renewal made by Andrew Forman, Archbishop of St Andrews, to his grandfather, Sir Robert Lauder of Bass, of the barony and lands of Tyninghame on 28 July 1517, when his name appears in the list of heirs and successors. He must have been an infant.

In the North Berwick Protocol Books (NAS-B56/1/1) Robert Lauder younger of The Bass, son and apparent heir to Robert Lauder, of The Bass, subscribed an obligation to William Lauder his eldest brother natural that he shall be seised in the lands of Little Spott, in East Lothian, dated 29 April 1553.

A legal instrument dealing with the redemption of property, dated 9 May 1573, refers to him as the "heir of Mr. John Sinclair, Dean of Restalrig". When John Sinclair, now Bishop of Brechin, died in April 1566 Robert Lauder of Poppill inherited his estates.

== Marriage dispute ==
On 24 July 1556 Jean Hepburn (also referred to as Jane, Joanna and Janet), Mistress of Bothwell, daughter of Patrick Hepburn, 3rd Earl of Bothwell (died 1556) and Margaret Sinclair (died 1572) daughter of Henry Sinclair, 1st Lord Sinclair, was hand-fasted to Robert Lauder younger of the Bass, in the presence of Walter Robertson, Vicar of Aberdour. Robert Lauder was bound by the marriage contract dated 12 August 1556, under penalty of £4000 Scots, to complete the bond of matrimony "in the face of The Holy Church" before Michaelmas next thereafter. However, he failed to do so, and an Inhibition to the recording of the contract, was registered 12 September 1556, and accordingly the Mistress of Bothwell brought an action for the amount of forfeit, which was heard on 20 December 1558.

She subsequently married John Stewart, Commendator of Coldingham and was twice married again. She was the sister of James Hepburn, 4th Earl of Bothwell.

== Military and political affairs ==
On 17 March 1566, Robert Lauder younger of the Bass, was appointed Captain of Tantallon Castle, the Keeper being the Earl of Atholl. This appointment followed the surrender of William Douglas of Lochleven who was one of those charged with the murder of David Rizzio.

Robert Lauder had a remission, with other members of his family, from Regent Moray for fighting on the Queen's side at the battle of Langside in 1568. During the Marian Civil War (1569–1572), he was exempted from military service, being "hevelie vexit with infirmitie of the gravell". Although formerly a Marian, he became a supporter of Regent Morton and the King's party in 1572. He sat in Parliament in 1572.

== Marriage ==
A charter narrates that his father granted him Robert Lauder, of The Bass granted him and his spouse Margaret Hay, the lands of Poppill (today Papple), in Haddingtonshire. Margaret is stated to be the daughter of William Hay, 2nd Lord Hay of Yester and Lady Margaret Livingstone. Witnesses to the charter were George Lauder, rector of Auldcathy, (soon to be Laird of Bass, and brother of the grantee) and William Lauder, son of Robert Lauder, senior, of The Bass. It was signed at Beil, near Stenton, on 4 April 1567.

== Death ==
The testament of Robert Lauder of Poppill was lodged at Edinburgh Commissariat Court on 12 December 1575, by his widow, Dame Margaret Hay, and his brother, the cleric Master George Lauder. It was written at Tyninghame on 12 April 1575 (the month he died). It is an extensive document and lists his moveable goods at £2869/5/2. Robert Lauder of The Bass, his father, and William, Lord Hay of Yester his brother-in-law were oversmen.
