= Robert Lauder of the Bass (died 1576) =

Robert Lauder of The Bass (born before 1504 – died June 1576) was an important noble in Haddingtonshire, the Merse, and Fife. Stodart remarks that "to 1600 the barons of the Bass sat in almost every parliament". He was a firm supporter of Mary, Queen of Scots whom he accompanied to Carberry Hill on 14 June 1567, and fought for her at the battle of Langside.

== Family and estates ==
He was the son of Sir Robert Lauder of the Bass (died between July 1517 – February 1518/9) by his spouse Elizabeth Lawson, who invested him in fee in Edrington, county Berwick, whilst still a child. Following his father's death, on 29 April 1519, Robert was invested in his paternal estates which included The Bass, the lands of Edrington with tower, mill, fishings and all pertinents extending to 15 husbandlands (390 acres);the town and territory of Simprin and the lands of Ladypart (near Lauder) with pertinents, Mersington with Mill, all in Berwickshire; the lands of Stenton, Duchry, Johnscleuch, Pencaitland, Newhall, Popill, Whitelaw, Wester Spott &c., Beil with its tower, mill &c., all in East Lothian. He took possession of Auldcathie in West Lothian, and Ummarchie in the barony of Kirriemuir in Angus.

On 4 January 1528/9 the Commendator of Scone Abbey granted him a hereditary feu of the lands and manor of Lochend, near Dunbar. Robert Lauder had a feu from the Prior & Convent of Dundee of the lands of "Kilduntane", Sheriffdom of Fife and the lands of "Cyr, lyand within ye Barony of Seygden" and Sheriffdom of Perth.

King James V gave him, under the Privy Seal of Scotland, the mails and duties of landis in the sheriffdoms of Edinburgh and Berwick, dated 17 July 1532.

In a further charter of 1538 under the Great Seal of Scotland, Robert Lauder was confirmed in the lands of Ethibetoun in East Brechin, Forfarshire. The same year the King confirmed to him the lands of Horshopcleuch in the barony of Lammermuir, Berwickshire, which had been forfeited by Archibald Douglas, 6th Earl of Angus.

In 1542 a confirmation was made by Cardinal David Beaton of the grant of the lands, bailiary, and barony of Tyninghame, made earlier by James Beaton, Archbishop of Saint Andrews on 9 July 1535, to Robert Lauder of The Bass and the heirs male of his body.

William Cockburn of Newhall confirmed by Great Seal charter Robert Lauder of Bass, his heirs and assignees, in the annualrents of the "42 husbandlands (1092 acres) of Newhall, Ballingrug, Howden, Heimurecroce, Woodhead, and Woodfute in Haddingtonshire. Signed at Beil, 14 April 1543.

A notarial instrument dealing with temple-lands at Hedderwick, North Berwick, and Tyninghame "which pertain to Robert Lauder, Lord of the Bass" is dated Edinburgh 23 June 1547. The Laird of Bass paid a rental on "the temple of Balgony" near North Berwick. These temple-lands had originally been in the possession of the Knights Templar.

== Builds hospital ==
Robert built and was patron of the famous Lauder's Hospital of the Poor Brothers at North Berwick circa 1540.

== Military activities ==
On 7 April 1529 James V gave a remission to Robert Lauder of The Bass and eleven others for treasonably intercommuning, resetting and assisting Archibald Douglas, 6th Earl of Angus (who had been forfeited), George Douglas, his brother, and Archibald, their uncle" whom Lauder had given refuge to in his castle of Edrington.

According to Sir James Balfour's Annales, in 1548; "Robert Lauder of Basse, with the French garisone of Dunbar, takes the Englische prowisione going from Berwick to Hadingtone; killes many shouldiours, and takes the [English] Governor of Hadingtone, named Sir James Wilford, who had come to aid them, prissoner."

John Lesley in his History of Scotland describes The Bass in 1548 as one of the "strengthis of Scotland". At St. Andrews, on 1 May 1562, "a Letter" was made out to Robert Lauder of The Bass, elder, giving him a licence for all the days of his life to be exempt from military service, providing always that his eldest son and heir apparent, with his household and folks etc., would serve in his stead.

Despite this, and his age, he came out in support of Mary, Queen of Scots and accompanied her, James Hepburn, 4th Earl of Bothwell, and their 2000-strong army from Dunbar Castle to confront the confederate Lords at Carberry Hill on 14 June 1567.

On 5 July 1568, at Edinburgh, Gasper Home was granted an escheat of the goods of Robert Lauder of The Bass, including his cattle and other goods on the steading and lands of Eddringtoun and the dues of the mill thereof, in the sheriffdom of Berwick, the said Robert being convicted as a fugitive for taking part with Archibald, Earl of Argyll, Claud Hamilton, and others in the battle of Langside in support of Mary, Queen of Scots. On 22 September 1568, at Edinburgh, a Precept of Remission was granted to Robert Lauder of Bass, Sir Robert Lauder of Popill, his son and heir apparent, John and Patrick Lauder, his sons, William Aslowane, servitor of the said laird ('servitoris dicti domini'), Charles Lauder, servitor of the said Robert in The Bass, and Archibald Lauder, also servitor of the said Sir Robert, for taking part with others at Langside, and for the treasonable keeping of the castle and fortalice of The Bass against the King (sic) and his authority after the said Robert had been commanded to deliver it.

== Loan to Mary, Queen of Scots ==
The registers of the Privy Council record that "the late Robert Lawder of The Bass" had loaned two thousand pounds to Queen Mary and Darnley. This had not been repaid, and Sir Robert's curator and executor (and son-in-law) David Preston of Craigmillar was now suing John Stewart of Traquair as one of those who had guaranteed the loan. The argument was that "the said laird of Craigmillar and Elizabeth Hay, Lady Bass, relict and executrix of the said Robert" expected John Stewart to pay up. They won this round. However it returned, on appeal, to the Privy Council on 3 and 19 October 1579, and again on 27 September 1580. The matter was never settled and by 1581 Elizabeth Hay, Lady Bass, had died and no-one pursued it further.

== Death ==
The Testament testamentar (first Will) registration in the Edinburgh Commissariot on 19 April 1577, stated that "an honourable man, Robert Lauder of Bass, died in June 1576".

== Marriages ==
Robert Lauder of The Bass married first Margaret (d. before 1558), daughter of Sir Oliver Sinclair of Roslin, Knt., by his spouse Margaret, daughter of William Borthwick, 2nd Lord Borthwick. He married secondly, Elizabeth (died before March 1581), a natural daughter of John Hay, 4th Lord of Yester, by whom he had a daughter Elizabeth, who married in August 1558, David Preston of Preston and Craigmillar Castle (d. March 1593).

By his first wife, Margaret Sinclair, he had twelve children.

- Sir Robert Lauder of Popill, Knt., M.P. (d. April 1575, v.p.)
- John Lauder, Captain of The Bass, (d. before November 1575, v.p.)
- James Lauder of The Bass, Dean of Restalrig, (murdered 4 October 1580, s.p.)
- Sir George Lauder of The Bass, (d. 27 June 1611)
- Patrick Lauder of Garvald (d. before 28 March 1588)
- Arthur Lauder of Scoonie, Fife (d. before July 1609)
- William Lauder of Edrington, Berwickshire, (d. before 15 October 1614)
- Henry Lauder (alive June 1575)
- Alexander Lauder, Parson of Glasgow, &c. (d. before 3 October 1571)
- Katherine (d.1604) married (1) Sir John Swinton, 19th of that Ilk (d. December 1579); (2) David Home of St.Leonards, & Dye, (k.1584); (3) in 1600, George Home of Broxmouth, East Lothian.
- Mariotta (d. after January 1594), married in 1569 Thomas Otterburn of Reidhall, East Lothian (d. between 1609 – July 1620).
- Margaret (d. before April 1591), married March 1573, Edward Aitkin, Advocate (d. after July 1593).

Robert Lauder of The Bass also had two natural children:

- William Lauder, Captain of The Bass, a son of Jonet Ker, (legitimised January 1566; murdered in a feud September 1572).
- Charles Lauder, Captain of The Bass, (d. before 16 April 1572, v.p., s.p.).
