= Colin Lauder =

British doctor (c. 1750–1831)

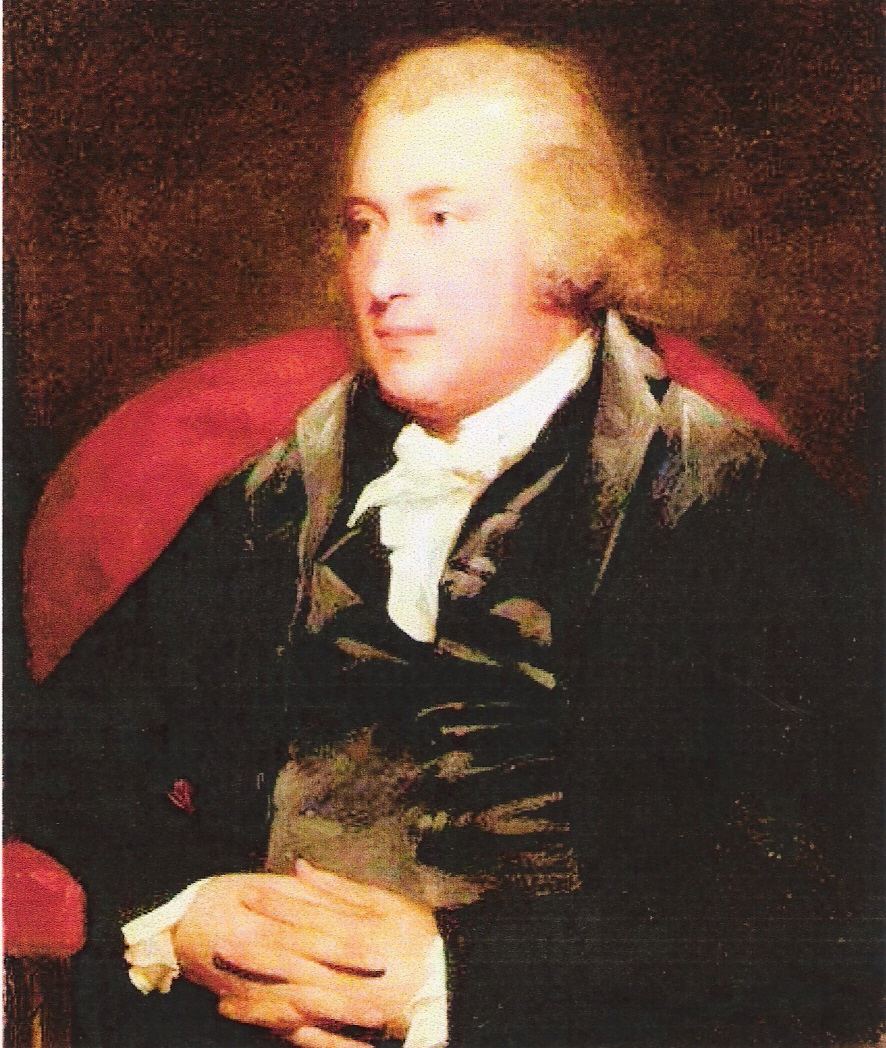
Dr Colin Lauder, from the painting by Sir Henry Raeburn

Colin Lauder (c. 1750 – 25 October 1831), Worlds End Close, Edinburgh) was a fellow of the Royal College of Surgeons of Edinburgh FRCSEd, and a burgess of Edinburgh. His portrait was painted by Sir Henry Raeburn.

== Life ==
The son of George Lauder (c.1712–1752), a surgeon and fellow of the Royal College of Surgeons of Edinburgh, by his spouse Rosina Preston (died 1786), Colin Lauder was the great-great-grandson of Sir John Lauder, 1st Baronet, of Fountainhall and the grandson of Surgeon John Lauder (surgeon) (1683–1737) deacon of the Royal College of Surgeons of Edinburgh.

Lauder trained at Glasgow University alongside Handyside Edgar becoming a lifelong friend of his brother Alexander Edgar through this link.

He served as a surgeon in the 17th Regiment of Foot from 14 October 1770 until 1772. He was elected a Fellow of the Royal College of Surgeons of Edinburgh on 31 August 1772 and was made a burgess of Edinburgh on 23 September 1772 in right of his father. In 1773 Lauder was a founding member of the Aesculapian Club. and in 1782 was one of the founding members of the Harveian Society of Edinburgh.

Dr Colin Lauder was the surgeon to the Scottish philosopher David Hume (as recorded by The Private Papers of James Boswell 1776). His Edinburgh home stood on Carrubbers Close off the Royal Mile.

A Sasine registered on 12 August 1785 records that George, Rosina, John and Lucinda Johnstone Lauder, children of Colin Lauder, surgeon, Edinburgh, were seised in part of a tenement of land in George Street, Edinburgh, on Disposition by Andrew Neil, mason, Edinburgh. Another Sasine, registered 8 July 1793, mentions "Colin Lauder late surgeon in Edinburgh, now at Fala House, Midlothian."

He was married four times:

- (1) on 1 June 1772 at St. Cuthbert's, Edinburgh, to Margaret Milne (born 20 November 1754, Died 30 July 1788), daughter of John Milne, founder and burgess of Edinburgh by spouse Elizabeth née Edgar, by whom he had issue – 10 children
- (2) Janet Law (marriage date unknown); she died 6 September 1810 at FalaHouse Midlothian). Very little known about her; there is unsubstantiated rumor of a portrait that existed, and there is a grandchild Janet Law Guild born to Colin's daughter Elizabeth Edgar Lauder.
- (3) Agnes Donaldson on 12 December 1810 (died 24 January 1822, no issue)
- (4) Margaret Ross on 21 May 1822 (died 11 September 1857, no issue)

Of his children:

- Dr William Preston Lauder FRSE (died 1 April 1852, Chelsea, London, Fellow of Royal College of Surgeons of Edinburgh, Fellow of the Royal Society of Edinburgh FRCE, Fellow of Royal College of Physicians of Edinburgh FRCPE, without issue.
- Francis Lauder (c. 1765 – 10 May 1803), a solicitor, married 25 March 1784 McLeish Rutherford (8 August 1762 – 22 February 1829), daughter of Lewis Rutherford in Dunbar, with issue.
- George Lauder (24 May 1774 – 25 November 1801), captain in the Madras Army
- John Lauder, Naval Physician (died July 1794 at sea en route from Jamaica to London), of Penicuik, and who also owned a farm at Easter Teary, Dyke, Elginshire.
- Rosina Preston Lauder (1776–1843) married, in 1803, Robert Sibbald, farmer of Humbie Mains, with issue.
- Elizabeth Edgar Lauder,(born 1783) married, in 1805, George Guild, farmer of Demple Mains, with issue, one of whom, Janet, married Nathaniel Spens of Craigsanquhar, Writer to the Signet. Another, Elizabeth, married Rear-Admiral John Macpherson Ferguson (1783–1855), Royal Navy.
