= George de Lawedre of Haltoun =

George de Lawedre (or Lauder) of Haltoun (c. 1351 – c. 1430) was a Burgess and Provost of Edinburgh in the early 15th century.

== Family ==
He was the first son of Alan de Lawedre of Whitslaid, and Haltoun (d. before 20 March 1407) by his second spouse, Elizabeth. Sometime before July 1393, his father settled upon him, presumably in fee, the estate of Haltoun in Edinburghshire. In The Great Seal of Scotland (appendix 2) for July 1393, King Robert III confirmed a charter (number 1686) by James Sandilands of Calder to George Lauder of Haltoun of the lands of Sornfallow and Greenhill in the barony of Wistoun, in Lanarkshire.

== Arms ==
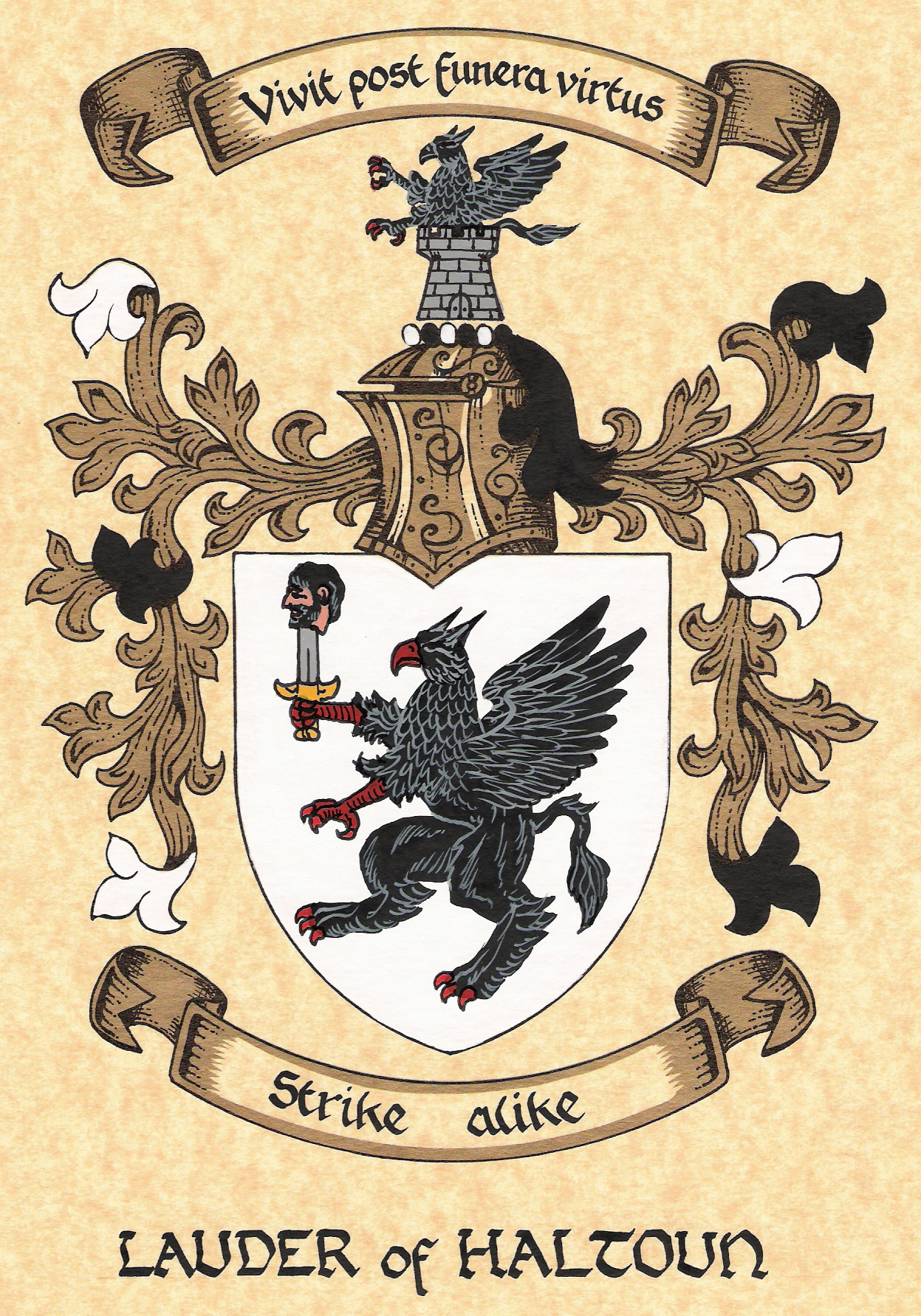

Nisbet states that the arms of "Lauder of Hatton" [sic] were "argent, a griffin rampant sable, beaked and membred gules, holding a sword with its forefoot, supporting a Saracen's head, proper; crest: a tower with a demi-griffin issuing out of the top of it: motto, Strike Alike". He alleges that the reason for the sword and the saracen's head is because they were descended from the 1189 crusader, Sir Robert de Lawedre.

== Ambassador ==
A Warrant of Safe Conduct from the Lord Chancellor of England was signed at Westminster by Henry IV of England on 1 December 1412, valid until the following Pentecost, and issued to William de Graham, Master Robert de Lany "licenciez en decrees & Provost de Seint Andrew", William de Borthwick, Esq., and George de Lawedre, burgess of Edinburgh, Ambassadors appointed by the "Council General of Scotland" to treat for the deliverance of James I of Scotland, and for a truce, as signified in letters from the Duke of Albany "the King's very dear cousin", accompanied by 40 horsemen.

A George Lawedre and Robert Lawedre of Scotland had a Safe Conduct issued on 13 May 1423, "for their ship laden with fish and other merchandise between England and their own country". It seems probable that the Provost of Edinburgh, a wealthy burgess, with his brother Robert, were the owners of the vessel.

== Provost ==
George Lauder was Provost of Edinburgh in 1413, 1426/7, and 1430. The Charters and other Documents relating to the City of Edinburgh (Edinburgh 1871) refer to a grant by Sir Robert Logan of Restalrig to the Community of Edinburgh dated 27 February 1413/4 and states "there being present noble men, George de Lawedre, then Provost of the said Burgh....".

Like his father, who had been Constable of Tantallon Castle, he was a Douglas adherent, and with others, is a witness to a charter of reconfirmation by Archibald Douglas Earl of Wigtoun & Longueville of a previous charter by Archibald Douglas, 3rd Earl of Douglas to the monastery of Melrose of the Regality of Eskdalemuir, on 16 January 1418.

George was also Custumar of North Berwick until 1426. John J. Reid, writes: "in a charter registered in 1426 Sir Robert Lauder of The Bass let the farms of North Berwick, and I find that in the same year he and his brother George both failed to pay the customs." Robert had died the previous year.

== Death ==
George's last mention in any records is in 1430.

== Marriage and children ==
George de Lawedre married Helen, daughter of Archibald, 3rd Earl of Douglas, 'The Grim', by his wife Joanna, daughter of Maurice de Moray, 9th Earl of Strathearn. They had four daughters who had life-rents in his Lanarkshire lands. Haltoun and all the entails passed to his brother:

- Sir Alexander Lauder of Haltoun, Knt.,(d. before June 1434 who married before 1408, Elizabeth, daughter of Sir John Forrester of Corstophine. with issue.

== Sources ==
- Systems of Heraldry, by Alexander Nisbet, Edinburgh, 1722, 2 vols.
- Calendar of Documents Relating to Scotland, edited by Joseph Bain, 1357–1509, Edinburgh, 1888, vol.IV.
- The Grange of St Giles, by J.Stewart Smith, Edinburgh, 1898.
