= Battle of Langside =

Opening battle of the Marian civil war in Scotland

Coordinates: 55.8277°N 4.27056°W

- Part of the Marian civil war
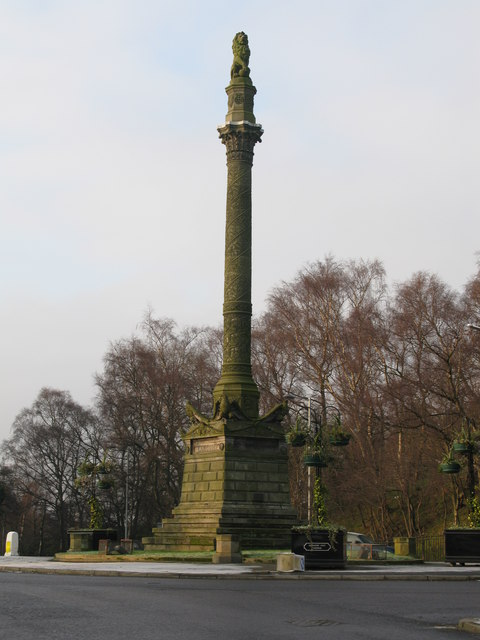
- Monument erected to commemorate the Battle of Langside
Date	13 May 1568
Location	Langside south of Glasgow
Result	King's men victory Mary, Queen of Scots exiled to England

Belligerents
(Scotland) King's men	(Scotland) Queen's men

Commanders and leaders
Regent Moray; Kirkcaldy of Grange	Campbell of Argyll

Strength
about 4,000	about 6,000

Casualties and losses
1 killed, unknown casualties	over 100 killed, unknown casualties

Registered battlefield
- Designated: 14 December 2012
- Reference no.: BTL35

The Battle of Langside was fought on 13 May 1568 between forces loyal to Mary, Queen of Scots, and forces acting in the name of her infant son James VI. Mary’s short period of personal rule ended in 1567 in recrimination, intrigue, and disaster when, after her capture at Carberry Hill, she was forced to abdicate in favour of James VI. Mary was imprisoned in Lochleven Castle, while her Protestant half-brother, James Stewart, Earl of Moray, was appointed Regent on behalf of his nephew. In early May 1568 Mary escaped, heading west to the country of the Hamiltons, high among her remaining supporters, and the safety of Dumbarton Castle with the determination to restore her rights as queen. Mary was defeated and went into exile and captivity in England. The battle is generally considered the start of the Marian civil war.

== Queen's Men ==
Mary's abdication had not been universally popular, even among sections of the Protestant nobility, and news of her escape were widely welcomed. With an escort of fifty horse led by Lord Claud Hamilton, she arrived in Lanarkshire, soon to be joined by a wide cross-section of the nobility, including the Earls of Argyll, Cassillis, Rothes, and Eglinton, the Lords Sommerville, Yester, Livingston, Herries, Fleming, Ross, numerous of the feudal barons, and their followers. Within a few days, Mary had managed to gather a respectable force of some 6,000 men.

== Mary at Hamilton ==
Mary declared at Hamilton that her abdication, and her consent to the coronation of James, had been extorted from her under duress. An act of council was then passed, declaring the whole process by which Moray had been appointed as Regent to be treasonable. On 8 May a bond was drawn up by those present for her restitution, signed by eight earls, nine bishops, eighteen lords, twelve abbots, and nearly one hundred barons. Mary would later write that her enemies were only five miles away.

Robert Melville brought a diamond ring, and four or more brooches to Mary at Hamilton. She gave the brooches to her supporters. The ring, with a heart shaped diamond, had been a gift from Elizabeth I with a promise of help. Mary asked her servant John Beaton to carry the ring back to Elizabeth.

Regent Moray was at Glasgow by 3 May 1567, and wrote letters describing Mary's escape to Hamilton to his diplomat in London Nicolas Elphinstone and the Earl of Leicester.

== Mary's march and Moray's response ==
It was Mary's intention to avoid battle if possible, retiring instead to Dumbarton Castle, still held for her by John Fleming, 5th Lord Fleming. Here she would be in a virtually impregnable position, well placed to receive the expected reinforcements from the north, and then recover her hold over the country by degrees. With the intention of by-passing Moray she marched to Rutherglen Castle meeting loyal supporters and then on a wide circuit past Glasgow, intending to move by way of Langside, Crookston, and Paisley back towards the River Clyde, and then on to Dumbarton on the north side of the Clyde estuary.

Moray drew up his army on the moor close to the village of Langside, then several miles south of Glasgow but now well within the city. Kirkcaldy, observed that Mary's force was keeping to the south of the River Cart, the Regent's army being on the opposite bank. He ordered hackbutters (musketeers), mounted behind each of his horsemen, to cross the river. They took up positions among the cottages, hedges, and gardens of the village, on each side of a narrow lane, through which Mary's army must defile. Meanwhile Moray continued to deploy the rest of the army, the vanguard under the command of the Earl of Morton leading the march across a nearby bridge. The whole army then deployed the right around the village. No sooner was this complete than the Queen's vanguard, commanded by Lord Hamilton, began its advance through the village. The battle was now under way.

== Guns and pikes ==
Mary's army was commanded by Argyll, who was to show little in the way of real military skill, seemingly hoping simply to push Moray aside by sheer force of numbers. George Buchanan wrote that Argyll fainted at one point, though this is almost certainly a rumour spread by his enemies. With her army now engaged, the Queen stood half a mile distance to the rear, close to Cathcart Castle on a mound since named as the Court Knowe. As Hamilton attempted to force a passage through Langside he was met by close fire from Grange's hackbutters. Many in the front ranks were killed, throwing the remainder back on those following, and adding to the general confusion. Hamilton pushed on, finally reaching the top of a hill, only to find the main enemy army drawn up in good order. Morton with the border pikemen advanced to intercept Mary's vanguard. Both sides now met in 'push of pike'. According to James Melville of Halhill the forest of inter-locked spears was now so thick that staves and discharged pistols thrown at the enemy simply rested on the shafts rather than falling to the ground.

Grange, whom Moray had allowed considerable leeway, continued to act with courage and distinction. According to James Melville, "the Regent committed unto the laird of Grange, the special care, as an experienced captain, to oversee every danger, to ride to every wing and encourage and make help where the greatest height was". The battle was now at its height and the outcome still doubtful, until Grange saw that the right wing of the Regent's army – consisting of the barons of Renfrewshire – was beginning to lose ground. He immediately galloped to the main battalion and brought reinforcements. This was done so effectively, and the counter-attack pressed with such force, that it broke the enemy ranks. Moray, who hitherto had stood on the defensive, repulsing Mary's cavalry, now charged at the main enemy battalion, the fight now joined all along the line. The Queen's men crumbled, the fugitives being closely pursued by a party of Highlanders. The Battle of Langside, which had lasted for some forty-five minutes, was over.

== Aftermath ==
Langside was a colossal defeat for Mary. Only one of Moray's men was killed, whereas over 100 of Mary's men were lost, a figure that almost certainly would have been much higher but for Moray's decision to avoid further bloodshed by ordering a halt to the pursuit. Over 300 of Mary's men were taken prisoner, including Lord Seton and Sir James Hamilton and many of his followers. Mary and her escort rode off, first trying to reach Dumbarton Castle, but then turning south, eventually arriving at Dundrennan Abbey. From here she left for England, never to see Scotland again.

Mary crossed the Solway Firth to Workington on 16 May 1568 at night with twenty companions. This unexpected event provoked a dispute amongst the English border officials. She stayed her first night at the house of Heny Curwen. On the next day she moved to Cockermouth and was greeted by Richard Lowther, the deputy of Lord Scrope at Carlisle Castle. Lowther escorted Mary to Carlisle on 18 May. Meanwhile, the Earl of Northumberland who was at Topcliffe heard the news from Workington, which was in his jurisdiction. The Earl obtained a letter of authority from the Council of the North at York to be the Scottish Queen's host and to "let none of them escape." When the Earl arrived at Carlisle on 22 May, Richard Lowther defied him, and the Vice-Chamberlain of England, Francis Knollys, upheld Lowther's actions.

Over the next five years Mary's supporters in Scotland continued a civil war with the Regents of Scotland.

== Queen and King's men ==
A contemporary list of leading supporters on both sides at the battle survives. From this list and other evidence, Gordon Donaldson analysed the allegiances of Scottish families during the 16th century to the cause of Mary, to English or French policy, and to the Scottish Reformation, in his All the Queen's Men (Edinburgh, 1983).

For the Queen:

- Earl of Argyll
- Earl of Eglinton
- Earl of Cassillis
- Earl of Rothes
- Lord Seton
- Master of Seton
- Lord Herries
- Lord Boyd
- Lord Hay of Yester
- Lord Ross
- Lord Somerville
- Lord Claude Hamilton
- Sir James Hamilton & the Hamilton name
- Andrew Hamilton of Goslington
- Robert Lauder of the Bass (died 1576)
- Robert Lauder of Popill

Killed on Queen's side:

- Captain Stewart, tutor of Castlemilk
- The Goodman of Ormeston, Hamilton
- John Hamilton of Milburn
- John Hamilton of Leprevick
- James Hamilton of Dalserf
- John Hamilton of Garen
- 60 to 80 gentleman of the Hamilton name, and others
- A brother of the laird of Lamberton.

For Regent Moray and the King:

- Earl of Morton
- Earl of Glencairn
- Earl of Menteith
- Lord Home
- Lord Lindsay
- Lord Ochiltree
- Lord Ruthven
- Laird of Trawick (sic), John Stewart of Traquair
- Laird of Drumlanrig
- Lord Secretary Maitland
- William Murray of Tullibardine, Lord Comptroller
- Robert Pitcairn, Abbot of Dunfermline
- John Hay, Abbot of Balmerino,
- Robert Richardson, Lord Treasurer
- Sir James Balfour, Justice Clerk
- James MacGill of Nether Rankeillour
- Thomas Kennedy of Bargany
- Laird of Glengarnock
- Andrew MacFarlane, laird of MacFarlane with his Highlandmen
- Other great barons and Hamiltons

Prisoners (taken by Regent Moray):

- Lord Seton
- Master of Cassilis
- Lord Ross
- Master of Eglinton
- Sheriff of Ayr
- Sir James Hamilton (of Libberton)
- The two sons of Archbishop Hamilton
- A son of Lord Kilwinning, Gavin Hamilton
- Laird of Innerwick
- James Heriot, laird of Trabroun
- Laird of Balwearie
- Laird of Preston younger
- Laird of Lauchop
- Laird of Mowe
- Laird of Irnok
- Laird of Camskeith
- Laird of Hahill
- Laird of Kneeland
- Laird of Greenschellis
- Goodman of Bothwellhaugh
- Goodman of Pardovan
- Many more Hamiltons and other gentlemen
