= George Lauder (bishop) =

Scottish bishop

George Lauder (about 1392 – after March 1466). was a Scottish prelate and Bishop of Argyll (or Episcopus Lismorensis).

== Background ==
Lauder was a son of Sir Robert Lauder of The Bass (d.1425) by his wife, Annabella. George consistently used his father's seal, containing the distinctive family Arms. Robert Lindsay of Pitscottie and Keith state that he was "of the Balcomy family". The superiority of Balcomy, next to Crail, Fife, in 1394 was possessed by Nicholas de Hay, and on 15 January that year it passed to David Lindsay of Carnbie. indicating that George Lauder only held Balcomy by hereditary feu. In 1444, with the consent of Patrick Lauder "his brother and heir of tailzie" [entail], he gave consent to the Prior of St. Andrews to dig stones out of the quarry at Balcomy to repair the convent. Sasine of Balcomy in Fife was eventually given to Isabelle Lauder in 1454. On 27 September 1465, the King confirmed to Alexander de Lesley [sic] de Warderis and Issabelle de Lawdre (Lauder in charter 2331 of 1496) his spouse, the lands of Balcomy in Fife, which Issabella (note the 'e' has become an 'a') "in her pure virginity" resigned for a regrant to her husband and herself following her marriage.

== Career ==
George de Lawedre, was Vicar of Crail, Fife, prior to 15 March 1425, when as such he was a witness to a charter at Perth. The Presentation of Crail was in the gift of the Prioress and convent of North Berwick, opposite The Bass. A priest named Alexander de Castelcaris made a Supplication to the Pope, on 28 July 1427, for its provision to himself upon George's promotion to the Bishopric. In addition he was also Master of St.Leonard's Hospital at Peebles, his successor appearing in a confirmation dated 25 July 1427 where it is stated that the vacancy had been created by Lauder's promotion to the Bishopric. Another Supplication was made on 5 March 1429 by Christopher Pontfret, M.A., priest, Glasgow diocese, that the Pope would provide him to the Vicarage of Crail, St.Andrew's diocese (£24 sterling pa) vacant about a year previous by the promotion of George Lawedre to the Bishopric of Lismore (Argyll), and the resignation of Alexander de Castillaris. That was contested by another Supplication dated 5 September that year for the same vicarage by Edward de Lawedre.

George Lauder was 'provided' as Bishop of Argyll on 26 May 1427, but it appears he was still unconsecrated on 30 June 1428.

The wilds of Argyll held their problems for the priesthood, demonstrated by a Supplication to the Pope over the Archdeaconry of Argyll, dated 29 July 1441, when Dugal (Campbell) of Lochaw, Lic.Dec., a priest in the diocese, questioned the authority of George Lauder, who he refers to as "alleged Bishop of Argyll".

In the National Archives of Scotland (GD112/1/8) are Letters dated 20 November 1454 by George (Lauder), Bishop of Argyll, reciting apostolic Letters of Pope Nicholas of 5 April 1454, for the marriage of Colin Campbell, Knt., of Glenurquha, and Jonet Stewart, daughter of John Stewart, Lord of Lorne, who are within the forbidden degrees of consanguinity. Witnesses: John Stewart, Lord of Lorne, Colin Campbell, Lord of Lochaw, James Lawedre, Vicar of Kippen, Thomas Spens, Rector of Lochfine, and Sir Ninian Morrison (Moritii). Lauder's Seal is almost entire, on a tag.

On 30 June 1461 a dispute over the patronage of the church of Dunoon arose between the Crown and George Lauder, Bishop of Argyll, James II having been said to have granted the right of patronage, which had been in his eldest son's gift, to the Bishop. James III now petitioned the Pope over a Presentation to that church which was refused by George Lauder. Some sort of compromise appears to have been reached as the "fruits" of the parish church of Dunoon were granted to the Bishop by "Royal Letters" and these were confirmed by the Pope on 26 June 1465.

On 29 April 1462, a Papal Indult was granted to George Lauder, Bishop of Argyll, who had petitioned the Pope requesting that he be permitted to reside outwith his diocese, in Glasgow, or some other suitable place not more than two days ride from his diocese, for seven years "on account of strife rageing between temporal lords and other magnates of his diocese, and the tumults of wars and dangers arising therefrom, and is unable to reside in Argyll".

It would appear that George Lauder, Bishop of Argyll, was still alive in March 1466.
