= Lauder =

Town in Scottish Borders, Scotland

Coordinates: 55.71936°N 2.74855°W

Lauder: Scottish Gaelic: Labhdar
- The town centre showing Lauder Town Hall and the flowerbed

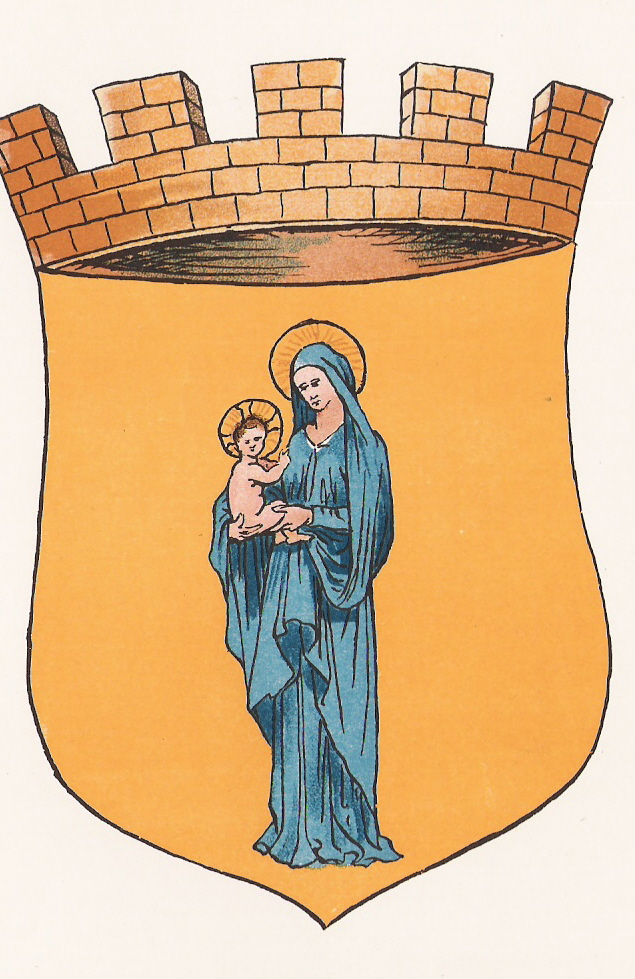
- Coat of Arms of Lauder Burgh

- Location within the Scottish Borders
- Area: 0.63 km^{2} (0.24 sq mi)
- Population: 1,878 (2022)
  - Density: 2,981/km^{2} (7,720/sq mi)
- OS grid reference: NT530475
  - Edinburgh: 23 mi (37 km) NW
- Civil parish: Lauder
- Community council: Lauderdale
- Council area: Scottish Borders
- Lieutenancy area: Roxburgh, Ettrick and Lauderdale
- Country: Scotland
- Sovereign state: United Kingdom
- Post town: LAUDER
- Postcode district: TD2
- Dialling code: 01578
- Police: Scotland
- Fire: Scottish
- Ambulance: Scottish
- UK Parliament: Berwickshire, Roxburgh and Selkirk
- Scottish Parliament: Midlothian South, Tweeddale and Lauderdale

Lauder (/ˈlɔːdər/, Scottish Gaelic: Labhdar) is a market town and former royal burgh in the Scottish Borders, Scotland. Historically part of the historic county of Berwickshire, on the Southern Upland Way, the town lies near the Leader Water, and is approximately 53 miles (86 km) southeast of Perth, 78 miles (126 km) east-southeast of Glasgow, and 27 miles (43 km) southeast of Edinburgh, on the western edge of the Lammermuir Hills. It had a population of 1,878 in 2022.

== Etymology ==
Although Lauder sits in the valley of Leader Water, Watson notes that the names Lauder and Leader appear to be unconnected. In the earliest sources Lauder appears as Lawedder and Loweder. The name may be derived from the Brittonic lǭwadr, meaning "washing or bathing place" (Breton laouer). Or else, Lauder may be named from a word related to Middle Welsh llawedrawr, "a heap of ruins".

== Medieval history ==
Below Lauder are the lands of Kedslie which were bounded on the west by a road called "Malcolm's rode", and it is thought this formed part of the Roman road known as Dere Street, which passed through Lauder. Hardie suggests that it had been reconditioned by Malcolm III for use in his almost constant warfare against England. It is the only old road in Scotland that is associated with the name of an individual person.

The ancient settlement was further up the hills on the edge of the Moor. The present town of Lauder existed as a kirk-town in the time of David I (1124–53), or from in the latter half of the twelfth century. The town was once surrounded by walls with gates commonly referred to as 'ports'. Two major mills, which dated from the 12th century, also served the town.

With the introduction of the feudal system to Scotland by David I, a provincial Lordship of Regality of Lauderdale, had been created for the King's favourite, Hugh de Morville (who founded Dryburgh Abbey), which covered an extensive amount of territory, although Thomson states that the family of de Lawedre were "there in the previous century." About 1170 Richard de Morville, Constable of Scotland, made a donation to the Brethren of the Hospital at Lauder, in 1245 a chapter of the clergy of East Lothian met at Lauder, and between 1248 and 1252 Emericus is recorded as Rector of Lauder.

Joseph Bain states that the de Morville's held one-third of half Lauder and Lauderdale for one knight's service. It would appear that de Morville's superiority did not extend over the entire valley of Lauderdale which, by his own demarcation recorded in the Chronicle of Melrose, stopped at the Lauder burn south of the town. This appears to be confirmed by the fact that a charter mentions Hugo de Morville possessing half of the mill of Lauder being the mill lands and rights south of the Lauder Burn, the other half being in the possession of the Lauder family. De Morville's inheritance passed to Alan of Galloway and later, to his daughter Ellen who had married Roger de Quincy, 2nd Earl of Winchester. Their daughter Margaret (d.1280) married William de Ferrers, 5th Earl of Derby and in 1290 their son "the late Sir William de Ferrers, Knt.," (d.1287) was on record as holding them.

An early member of the Lauder family, Sir Robert de Lawedre of The Bass (c1275 – September 1337) was Justiciar of Lothian as early as 1316. He received a charter dated 4 March 1316, from John Graham of Abercorn, of his lands of Dalcoif, parish of Merton, Berwickshire. The superiority of this property remained in that family for centuries. In 1683 Christina Home, the granddaughter of the last Robert Lauder of that Ilk (d. before July 1655) was retoured heir to it.

The same Robert de Lawedre was one of the witnesses to two charters of confirmation to Jedburgh Abbey on 20 December 1316, signed at Berwick-upon-Tweed. A document written in French, and dated 4 September 1319, entitled: "Lettre d'attorne pur doner seysine," and is granted to "Robert de Lawedir Justice de Lounes, [Lothians]....Donez a la langley en la terre de Meuros [Melrose] le quartior de Septembre en lan de grace MCCC et disneifme."

Above the burgh of Lauder, abutting Lauder Moor and the boundaries of Wedale and the lands of Ladypart, were the lands of Alanshaws, granted to the monks of Melrose by Alan of Galloway, the Constable of Scotland. By 1500 these too were in the hands of the Lauders, probably by feu. The superiority of Ladypart remained in the hands of the Lauder of Bass family until the 17th century, reconfirmed to Robert Lauder of The Bass (d. 1576).

This family erected a Scottish tower house, "the beginning of authentic history as far as the town is concerned," around which the present town grew, and "Alan Lawedir of the Tower of Lawedir" is mentioned in 1445. Lauder Tower stood in what in 1903 was known as Tower Yard, a garden area then bounded by the Free Kirk Manse and the County Police Station, close by the Easter Port. The road west from the town crossed the Midrow and passed Tower Yard, then passed by Lauder Mill. A continuation of the road went onwards to Chester Hill. It was not taken down until 1700. In 1837 "the new United Presbyterian manse was built on a site which was purchased, for £115, from Baillie [George] Lauder."

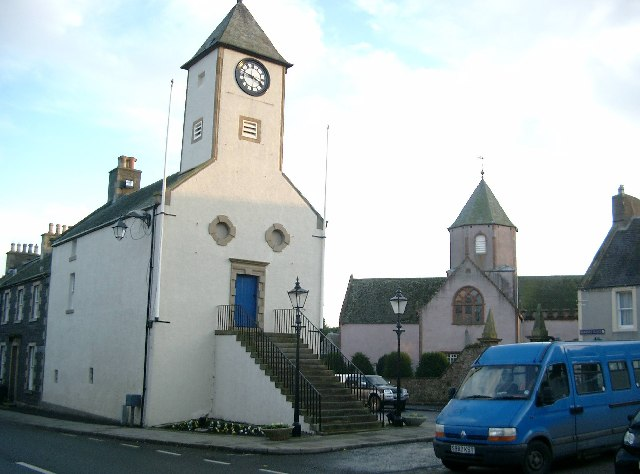
Lauder Town Hall with Lauder Kirk in the background

Notable buildings in the town today include the former tolbooth, Lauder Town Hall, which predates 1598 when records show it being burnt by a party of Homes and Cranstouns led by Lord Home who killed a prisoner William Lawther.

The last of the ancient proprietors, Robert Lauder of that Ilk (d.c1655), bequeathed the tower house and other lands to his daughter Isobel, who had married Alexander Home of St. Leonards, in Lauderdale, both dead by November 1683, the major part of the inheritance sold. The old family is today represented by Sir Piers Dick-Lauder, 13th Baronet.

== Thirlestane Castle ==
Below the town, on Castle Hill, stood the Crown Fort, a scene of many skirmishes over the years. It is shown on Timothy Pont's map. Early records give de Morville a castle at Lauder, but it would appear that there was a new erection of it by the English in the reign of King Edward I. James III and James IV both used the castle. In 1548 the fort was occupied and strengthened by Somerset, the Protector, and garrisoned by Sir Hugh Willoughby 'in the end of winter and beginning of spring'. After a minor siege with French cannon, it was evacuated on 22 March 1550. The following year John Haitlie in Fawns and William Haitlie in Redpath (near Earlston) were arrested for "treasonably supplying the English in the Castle of Lauder, thereby enabling them to hold out longer." The Crown which had in any case abandoned the fort during its occupation, had given it to Robert Lauder of that Ilk (d. bef July 1567), who provided it, in 1532, to his daughter Alison as dowry when she married. Following she and her husband's deaths in feuds in 1547 it reverted to Robert Lauder whose wife was Alison Cranstoun. A Cranstoun relation later sold it on to Chancellor John Maitland in 1587. He commenced the building of the magnificent Thirlestane Castle upon that site two years later, parts of the original walls of the ancient fort being included in the walls of the new edifice. In 1670-7 Sir William Bruce, known as a 'gentleman architect', supervised its transformation into a palace through remodelling for the Duke of Lauderdale.

By the 18th century the Maitlands had supplanted the ancient Lauders as the pre-eminent local family, and had managed to acquire most of the properties which had belonged to the ancient family, although Windpark/Wyndepark (which overlooked Thirlestane Castle) and its Pele Tower remained in the hands of John Lauder of Winepark and Carolside (near Earlston), until about 1750.

== Church ==
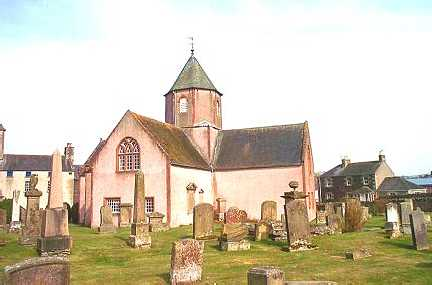
Lauder's Church of Scotland kirk in 2001

Near to the old Crown Fort stood the ancient parish church of St. Mary (a dependency of Dryburgh Abbey). In a Writ of c1217 an "Everardus" is recorded as pastor of Laweder, and in 1245 there was a Chapter of the Clergy of East Lothian at Lauder on Saturday after the Feast of Saint Peter, ad vincula, when a dispute was settled between the Priory of St. Andrews and the nuns of Haddington, regarding the tithes of Stevenstoun, nr. Haddington. In this original church many of the old Lauder family were interred, including two bishops, William de Lawedre, Bishop of Glasgow and Lord Chancellor of Scotland, and Alexander Lauder, Bishop of Dunkeld. It was from this church, in 1482, that James III's favourites, including the architect Robert Cochrane, and his tailor James Homyll, were dragged by envious nobles led by Archibald Douglas, 5th Earl of Angus and hanged from the (earlier) Lauder Bridge. The sites of the ancient kirk and the bridge from which Cochrane and his colleagues met their demise, are now within the immediate policies of Thirlestane Castle, the church some 60 yards from the west front, and the bridge some quarter-mile to the north-east.

With their local ascendancy, and with Thirlestane Castle becoming even grander, John Maitland, 1st Duke of Lauderdale decided he would demolish the ancient kirk, and had a new church erected by Sir William Bruce in 1673 in the centre of the Royal Burgh. Around it is a walled graveyard, with a watchhouse built after a bodysnatching raid in 1830.

There was also (now demolished) a large United Presbyterian Church at the West Port. The manse still stands, but is now a private residence.

== Today ==
In 2015 Lauder's population was estimated by the National Records of Scotland as 1,803.

Lauder is today strongly influenced by its proximity to Edinburgh as it is now considered to be close enough for people to commute into the capital for work. The bus service to Edinburgh is reliable but infrequent, with 8 buses daily.

Recent developments in Lauder include the construction of a new primary school, a new health centre, and the expansion of the nearby Dun Law wind farm.

== Notable residents ==
- Thomas Dickson (1822–1884), industrialist, founder of The Dickson Manufacturing Company, president of the Delaware and Hudson Railway
- Doddie Weir (1970–2022), rugby union player

== See also ==
- The Sir Walter Scott Way long-distance path from Moffat to Cockburnspath passes through Lauder.
- List of places in the Scottish Borders
- List of places in Scotland
