= Robert Lauder of Beilmouth =

Sir Robert Lauder of Beilmouth, Knt., (died 24 June 1709) was an armiger, lawyer and Clerk of Exchequer in Scotland. In 1683 he was made a Justice of the Peace for Haddingtonshire. In 1685, under the title Robert Lauder of Belhaven, he was a member of the Scottish parliament for Haddington, and in 1704 as Sir Robert Lauder of Beilmouth. He was also Commissioner of Supply for Haddington in 1689 and 1690.

Lauder of Beilmouth Arms

== Family ==
The son of Robert Lauder of Belhaven and West Barns, Dunbar (d. c. 1672), by his spouse Marie (d. before July 1657), daughter of Patrick Douglas of Standingstone by his wife Christian, daughter of Andrew Leslie, of Inverdovate, Fife, Robert jnr is mentioned in his mother's Testament. Some time between 1672–1677 Robert Lauder, portioner (landowner) of Belhaven and West Barns, matriculated Arms as a direct descendant of the family of Lauder of The Bass. The motto over the crest means it sprouts forth again. It is unclear if he then changed his designation to 'of Beilmouth' or whether he did so when he was knighted, some time in the 1690s.

== Legal Agent for Edinburgh ==
In December 1672 George Norvell, advocate died and was replaced by Mr. Robert Lauder of Belhaven as Agent for the college (Edinburgh University) and town, by Act of the town council, a few days later.

"Robert Lauder, portioner of Belhaven, and Agent for the good town of Edinburgh, and college therein, was admitted a Burgess of Edinburgh by right of his wife Jonet, daughter to Thomas Young of Leny, WS., who himself was admitted as a Burgess of this Burgh as spouse to Margaret, daughter to James Primrose, Clerk to HM Privy Council of Scotland, 7 April 1675".

A copy of the Test dated November 1681 subscribed to by advocates and other lawyers, was provided to the Privy Council by "Robert Lauder, Agent for the town of Edinburgh, and Notary Public".

Lord Fountainhall notes that Robert Lauder demitted office in 1686: "Mr.William Gordon made Agent to the town of Edinburgh, in place of Mr.Robert Lauder, at the Scots Parliament dissolved 8 October 1686".

== Clerk of Exchequer ==
Sometime before 1677 he was made one of His Majesty's Clerks of Exchequer. Robert Lauder of Beilmouth is mentioned many times in relation to bonds and actions relating to the Exchequer, and he was still in office in 1697.

== Witches ==
Robert Lauder of Beilmouth's father, also Robert, had been on a Commission to try witches in 1661 and 1662, and on another to try a murderer on 5 January 1664.

The son continued in pursuit of witches: Lord Fountainhall relates that "Mr.Robert Lauder, and some other gentlemen at Dunbar, by commission from the Privy Council of Scotland, upon some presumptions, condemned ane old woman for a witch. She was brought before the Councill, and they enclined to assolzie her, and sent her back to prison; for the main thing proven, was her threatening such as refused to give her money, and some evil accidents befalling them shortlie thereafter. But, on 12 July 1688, being brought again before the Councill, she was remitted back to Dunbar, to be burnt there, if her Judges pleased, because she had confessed once, though she retracted".

== Burgess of Canongate ==
In The Roll of Canongate (Edinburgh) Burgesses, dated 2 October 1705, Sir Robert Lauder of Beilmouth was made a Burgess of Canongate "for many good services done by him to the burgh".

== Marriages and death ==
Sir Robert died at Edinburgh, where his Testament was proved on 9 February 1710. He married three times: (1) before 1673, Jonat, daughter of Thomas Young of Leny, W.S., by his spouse Margaret Primrose. Jonat died 18 August 1687 and was buried in Greyfriars Churchyard, Edinburgh, leaving children (i); (2) 19 August 1688, at Dunbar, Lilias Brown, with no children; (3) 25 April 1694 at the Tron Kirk, Edinburgh, Helen (d. 9 January 1714), daughter of George Ogilvy, 2nd Lord Banff (d.1668) by his spouse Agnes, daughter of Sir Alexander Falconer, 1st Lord Falconer of Halkerton. They left children (ii):

- (i) Baby daughter buried in Greyfriars Churchyard, 8 October 1673.
- (i) Archibald Lauder of Beilmouth, (b. 21 June 1675), his eldest son and successor, who left children.
- (i) Mary (b. 16 February 1678), married George Hepburn, M.D., later in Kings Lynn, Norfolk.
- (i) Jonet, (b. 8 August 1679).
- (ii) Robert Lauder of Rosecraig, Aberdeenshire (d. 7 January 1723), married, 11 October 1722, at Banchory, Jean Gordon.
- (ii) George Lauder of Pitscandlie, Forfarshire (31 October 1699 – before 29 July 1760)), married Jean, daughter of Sir Thomas Burnett, 3rd Baronet, of Leys, M.P.
- (ii) Janet (1698–1774).
