= Stenton =

Village in East Lothian, Scotland

Coordinates: 55.961°N 2.606°W

Stenton: Scots: Staneton
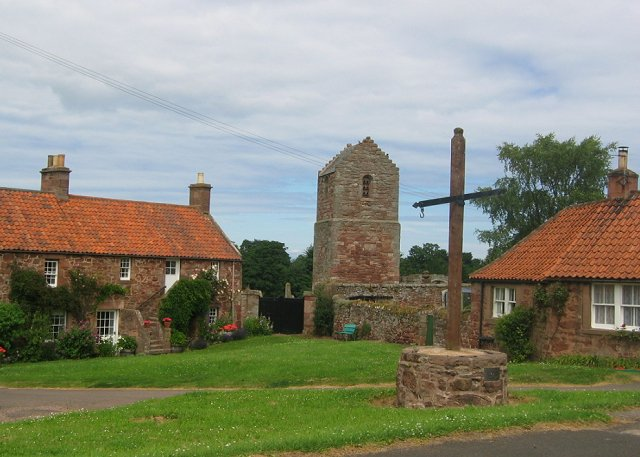
- Stenton showing the village Tron

- Location within Scotland
- OS grid reference: NT621743
- Civil parish: Stenton
- Council area: East Lothian Council
- Lieutenancy area: East Lothian
- Country: Scotland
- Sovereign state: United Kingdom
- Post town: DUNBAR
- Postcode district: EH42
- Dialling code: 01368
- Police: Scotland
- Fire: Scottish
- Ambulance: Scottish
- UK Parliament: East Lothian
- Scottish Parliament: East Lothian

Stenton (Scots: Staneton) is a parish and village in East Lothian, Scotland. It is bounded on the north by parts of the parishes of Prestonkirk and Dunbar, on the east by Spott and on the west by Whittingehame. The name is said to be of Saxon derivation. The village has a number of houses, a school, and a church.

== Geography ==
A portion of the parish formerly cut off from the main part stretches into the Lammermuir Hills to a distance of about 8 miles from the village, and is bounded on the south by the Whiteadder Water, and Berwickshire.

Springs and streams abound in many parts of the parish. A rivulet which rises in the high ground of Stoneypath farm, runs through the Ruchlaw estate (ancient seat of the Sydserf family) and joins the Whittinghame Water a mile or so further on. Pressmennan lake, at the east end of a deep natural valley, with Duchrie Dod Hill and Pressmennan Hill on the south and east is about one mile south of the village of Stenton. It was artificially formed about the year 1819 by William Hamilton-Nisbet of Biel (1747-1822), and is two miles in length and of good breadth. It is the only loch of any consequence in East Lothian. The overflow water from the loch forms a pretty stream which runs past Broxburn, &c., and falls into the sea at Broxmouth, just south of Dunbar.

== Early proprietors ==
Stenton had been a superiority of the Lauder of the Bass family from the 13th century until the middle of the 17th century. Henry the Minstrel records in his poem The Wallace that William Wallace rewarded Sir Robert de Lawedre with the lands of Stenton in 1297. Bain records long lists of Scots who have been forfeited of properties by the English King Edward III between 1335 and 1337: Robert de Lawedre 'fils' has forfeited half the domain lands of Stenton (where he is described as his father's son and heir), the other half being retained by his mother, Elizabeth. The Lauders retained Stenton parish down through the centuries: the Exchequer Rolls record that Robert Lauder of The Bass was granted Sasine of Stenton in 1495, following the death of his father. In the National Archives (GD6/219) there is an extract contract of wadset (mortgage or security) between George Lauder of the Bass and Isobel Hepburne, his mother, and William Diksoun in Biel of the east half of the town and lands of Stentoun, barony of Biel, dated 3 August 1620 (recorded in the Books of Council and Session, 6 June 1623). This last Lauder laird of The Bass parted with Stenton in 1644.

== Biel estate ==
The superiority of the lands of Biel were held until 1489 by the Dunbar family, former Earls of March. The Great Seal of Scotland charter (number 1894) dated 12 September 1489 relates their sale, the King confirming a charter to "his armiger" Robert Lauder of Edrington, (from 1495 Robert Lauder of The Bass) (d. bef. Feb 1508), and his heirs, of the lands of Bele (sic), Johnscleuch, le Clyntis, all with their towers, mills etc., in the Barony of Dunbar, which had been formerly owned by Hugo Dunbar of Bele; plus the lands and mill of Mersington, Berwickshire, which Hugo Dunbar of Bele also resigned. Robert's wife Isabella, daughter of John Hay, 1st Lord Hay of Yester, is also mentioned. Biel and a number of other lands was made into a feudal barony.

When his grandson Robert Lauder of The Bass died in June 1576, he was succeeded by his son James Lauder, Dean of Restalrig, whom he at one time imprisoned in Biel Tower over religious matters. James Lauder apparently continued to reside there until he was murdered by a cousin "within his [James's] awin place of Beill" on October 4, 1580. Sixty-four years later, George, the last Lauder laird of The Bass sold the Biel estate to John Hamilton of Bromehill, who, in 1647, was raised to the title of Lord Belhaven and Stenton. Hamilton was a keen gardener, and laid out the still extant terraces from the Tower House down to the Biel Water.

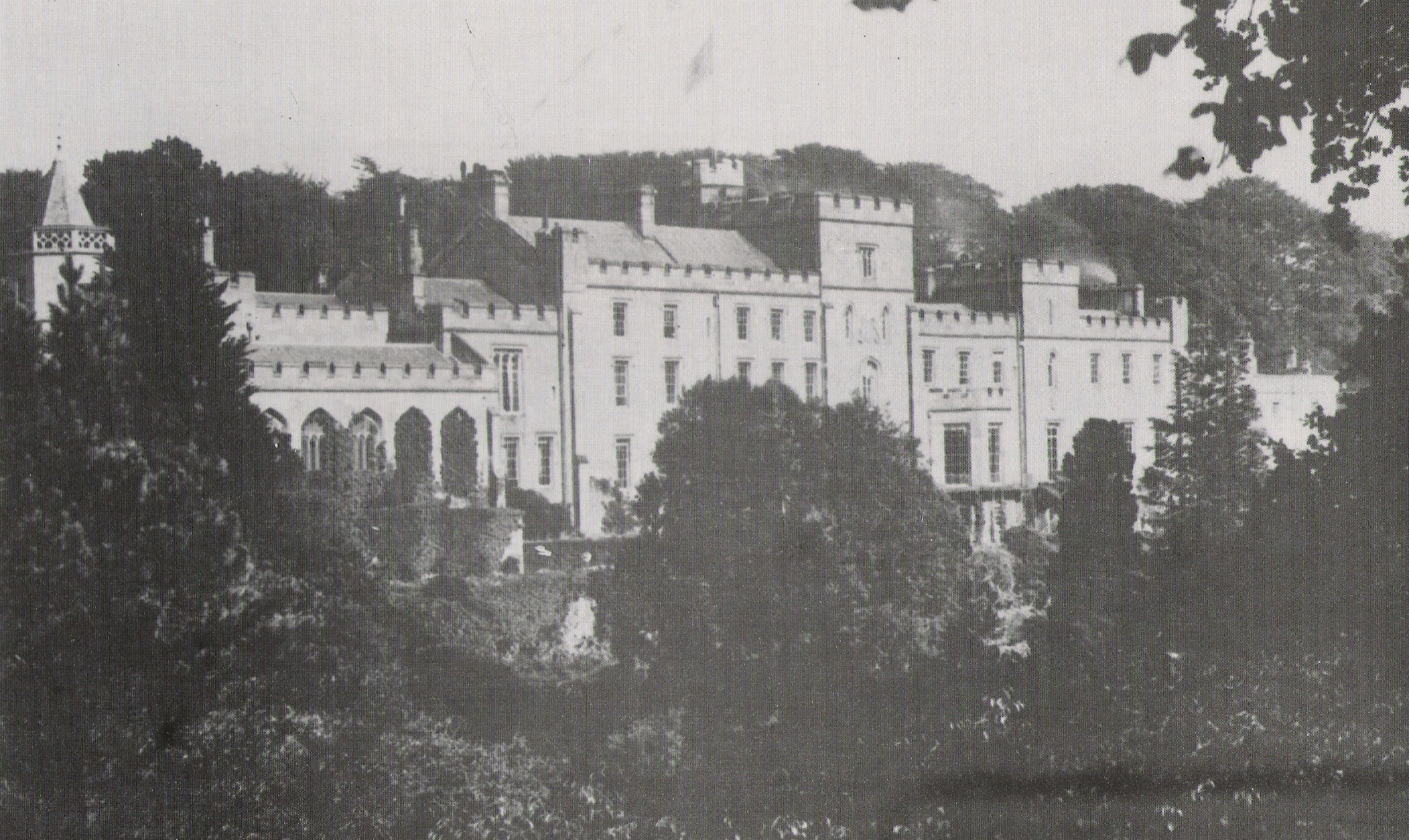
Biel House, c1900

The Pele Tower at Biel dates from the 14th century and was added to through the years. In 1760 the house was extended to the west, and then in 1814-18 extended to the east by "vast monastic Gothic additions" in red sandstone by architect William Atkinson for William Hamilton-Nisbet of Biel. At the west end was a large conservatory rebuilt in 1883 as a chapel. Some of these fittings were retained when the chapel and most of Atkinson's magnificent house were demolished in 1952. The house as it stood before demolition was 593 foot in length, its great length being relieved by the original Tower in the middle, and the turret of the chapel at the west end. The lower part of the square tower (today the east end of the present block) contains the walls of the original Pele which had barrel-vaulted rooms in the basement. The Tapestry Room was refitted by Robert Lorimer in the early 20th century, and Country Life in 1902 thought Biel "deserved to be ranked among the finest of the great houses in Scotland". it owned the Pressmennan lake and built the house which was used as a game house for hunting and fishing. They sold it in the 1950s and is now a house.

== Ruchlaw House ==
Just outside Stenton is Ruchlaw House, an early 17th-century, three-storey, L-shaped house built by Archibald Sydserf of Ruchlaw and completed in 1663. It is located on the left bank of the Sauchet Water, to the west of Stenton. In 1950, the Scottish playwright James Brodie bought the house and lived there with his family for many years.

== Namesakes ==
Stenton, the country estate of James Logan (now a museum and park well within the city of Philadelphia), was named for Stenton parish, which was the birthplace of Logan's father. Philadelphia currently has two Stenton Avenues, at least one of which gets its name from the Stenton estate.

== See also ==
- Biel Water
- List of places in East Lothian
- Henry Grey
