= John Lauder (disambiguation) =

John Lauder (c. 1488 – between 1551 and 1556) was Scotland's Public Accuser of Heretics.

John Lauder may also refer to:

- John Lauder, Lord Fountainhall (1646–1722), Scottish jurist
- Sir John Lauder, 3rd Baronet (1669–1728)
- Sir John Lauder, 1st Baronet (1595–1692)
- John Lauder (surgeon) (1683–1737), Scottish surgeon
- John D. Lauder (1855–1934), Canadian politician
- John Lauder (priest) (1829–1900), Dean of Ottawa

== See also ==
- John Dick-Lauder (disambiguation)
