= 6th Lancers =

6th Lancers may refer to:

- 6th Lancers (India)
- 6th Lancers (Pakistan)
