= John Dick-Lauder =

John Dick-Lauder may refer to:

- Sir John Dick-Lauder, 8th Baronet
- Sir John Dick-Lauder, 11th Baronet

== See also ==
- John Lauder (disambiguation)
