= George Dick-Lauder =

George Dick-Lauder may refer to:

- Sir George Dick-Lauder, 12th Baronet, British author and soldier
- Sir George Dick-Lauder, 10th Baronet, Indian Civil Service administrator
