= Andrew Lauder =

Andrew Lauder may refer to:

- Andrew Lauder (burgess) (1702–1769), Scottish nobleman
- Andrew Lauder (music executive) (1947–2025), British record company executive
