= William Horrocks =

English physician and army officer (1859-1941)

Brigadier-General Sir William Horrocks KCMG CB
- Born: 25 August 1859; Bolton, Manchester, England
- Died: 26 January 1941 (aged 81); Surrey, England
- Relatives: Brian Horrocks (son)
- Military career
- Allegiance: United Kingdom
- Branch: British Army
- Service years: 1887–1919
- Rank: Temporary Brigadier-General; Substantive Colonel
- Unit: Royal Army Medical Corps
- Other work: Director of Hygiene, War Office

Brigadier-General Sir William Heaton Horrocks KCMG CB (25 August 1859 – 26 January 1941) was an officer of the British Army remembered chiefly for confirming Sir David Bruce's theory that Malta fever was spread through goat's milk. He also contributed to the making safe of water, developing a simple method of testing and purifying water in the field. Because of his work, he became the first Director of Hygiene at the War Office in 1919.

== Early life and career ==
William Heaton Horrocks was the son of William Holden Horrocks of Bolton. Horrocks studied for his M.B. at Owen's College and passed his first M.B. examination in 1881. He received a Third Class Honours pass in Anatomy, and a Second Class in Physiology and Histology.

Previously a Surgeon on probation, Horrocks was promoted to Surgeon (the equivalent of Captain) on 5 February 1887. While serving in India, Horrocks married Minna Moore (died 1921), the daughter of the Reverend J.C. Moore of Connor, County Antrim on 27 September 1894 at Christ Church, Mussoorie. Together they had one son and one daughter. His son Brian also joined the British Army, and became a leading corps commander during the Second World War.

Horrocks was promoted from Captain to Major on 5 February 1899.

== Malta fever ==
In 1904 Horrocks was appointed as a member of the Royal Society's Mediterranean Fever Commission, to investigate the highly contagious disease Malta fever which was prevalent in the British colony of Malta. Identified by Sir David Bruce in 1887, Malta fever was characterised by a low mortality rate but was of indefinite duration. It was accompanied by profuse perspiration, pain and occasional swelling of the joints. In 1905 Sir Themistocles Zammit infected a goat with the bacteria Micrococcus Melitanensis which then caught Malta fever. Horrocks was the first person to find the bacteria in goat's milk, thus identifying the method of transmission.

In attempting to settle the matter of who was responsible for the discovery, Bruce (who had served as chairman of the Commission, wrote to The Times newspaper:

I saw Dr. Zammit's notes as to two experiments on the effect of feeding goats on materiel containing Micrococcus Melitanensis. I urged Dr. Zammit to continue his investigations, and he accordingly bought a small herd of goats. Before proceeding to repeat the feeding experiments on these new goats he examined their blood, as a matter of routine, and much to his surprise, found that five out of the six gave a Malta fever reaction. He then took specimens of the blood to Major Horrocks, another member of the commission, and asked him to confirm his observations. This Horrocks did; and at once Dr. Zammit and he proceeded to examine, the former the blood and the latter the milk of the goats for the Micrococcus Melitanensis, with the result, as is well known, that this micro-organism is found in the blood, and excreted in the milk, to the extent of 10 per cent, of the goats of Malta.

Horrocks afterwards served as sanitary officer at the British colony of Gibraltar, where he noted that the incidence of Malta fever practically disappeared with the removal of Maltese goats from that place.

== Later career ==
Horrocks was promoted to lieutenant colonel on 19 May 1911, then in July was promoted brevet colonel dated 20 May, in recognition of his services. In 1915, Horrocks was honoured by becoming an Honorary Surgeon to King George V, commencing 6 November 1914, holding the appointment until 26 December 1917.

Horrocks also developed the "Horrocks Box", following his research into contamination of water. This device used sand filtration and chlorine sterilisation plants to provide a portable means of decontaminating water supplies. It proved of particular use during the First World War, when it kept the Allied forces largely free of water-borne disease. In addition to this he also developed means of removing poisons from water and assisted in the design of the first gas mask.

For his services in the war, Horrocks was honoured with appointments to a number of orders. On 24 January 1917 he was appointed a Companion of the Bath. On 3 June 1918 (in the King's Birthday Honours) Horrocks was appointed a Knight Commander of the Order of Saint Michael and Saint George. He became the first Director of Hygiene at the War Office on 1 June 1919 in recognition of his expertise in military hygiene, this last period of active duty came to an end on 1 November 1919, and he relinquished his temporary rank of Brigadier-General.

Horrocks died on 26 January 1941 at the age of eighty-one, at Hersham in Surrey. His funeral took place at St. Peter's Church, Hersham on 31 January with his son and daughter, among others, present.

== Published works ==
- Horrocks, William Heaton (1901). An Introduction to the Bacteriological Examination of Water. London: J. & A. Churchill.
- Bruce; et al. (1905). Reports of the Commission appointed by the Admiralty, the War Office and the Civil Government of Malta, for the Investigation of Mediterranean Fever. London: Harrison and Sons. pp. 5–72. (Report II by Major W. H. Horrocks) pdf at militaryhealth.bmj.com

=== Selected articles ===
- Horrocks, W. H. (1899). "I. Gastroplication for Dilated Stomach". Annals of Surgery. 30 (3): 249–252. PMC 1427288. PMID 17860744.
- —— (1901). "A Comparative Study of Varieties of B. Coli isolated from "Typhoid" and Normal Dejecta". Journal of Hygiene. 1 (2): 202–213. doi:10.1017/S0022172400000176. PMC 2235948. PMID 20474115.
- —— (1901). "Perforated Ulcer of the Stomach". British Medical Journal. 1 (2099): 697. doi:10.1136/bmj.1.2099.697. PMC 2400511. PMID 20759502.
- —— (1901). "On the Protection from Waterborne Disease Afforded by the Pasteur-Chamberland and Berkefeld Filters". British Medical Journal. 1 (2111): 1471–1472. doi:10.1136/bmj.1.2111.1471. PMC 2401231. PMID 20759683.
- Firth, R. H.; —— (17 September 1902). "An inquiry into the influence of soil, fabrics, and flies in the dissemination of enteric infection". The British Medical Journal. 2 (2178): 936–943. JSTOR 20273666.
- —— (1903). "The Bacillus Coli Communis: Sewage Contamination of Water Supplies" (PDF). BMJ Military Health. 1 (5): 362–376. Archived from the original on 22 March 2020.
- ——; Bruce, David (1905). "Preliminary note on goats as a means of propagation of Mediterranean fever". Proceedings of the Royal Society of London. Series B, Containing Papers of a Biological Character. 76 (510): 378–384. doi:10.1098/rspb.1905.0031.
- —— (1905). "Ergophobia". British Medical Journal. 1 (2303): 386–387. doi:10.1136/bmj.1.2303.386. PMC 2319236.
- —— (1907). "Experiments made to determine the conditions under which "specific" bacteria derived from sewage may be present in the air of ventilating pipes, drains, inspection chambers, and sewers". Proceedings of the Royal Society of London. Series B, Containing Papers of a Biological Character. 79 (531): 255–266. doi:10.1098/rspb.1907.0017.
