= Sir John Dick-Lauder, 11th Baronet =

British Indian Army officer (1883–1958)

Sir John North Dalrymple Dick-Lauder of Fountainhall, 11th Baronet, born 22 July 1883 at Sultanpur Lodhi, and baptised at Christ Church, Mussoorie, India. He was the only child of Sir George William Dalrymple Dick Lauder, 10th Baronet (d.1936) by his spouse Jane Emily Clifford (d.1921), daughter of W P Woodward, of the Indian Civil Service.

He was educated at Malvern College and the Royal Military College, Sandhurst, passing out on 21 January 1903, when he was commissioned a second lieutenant in the Indian army. In 1904 he joined the 16th Cavalry (later 6th Duke of Connaught's Own Lancers). During the First World War, he firstly was ADC to Major General G. A. Cookson, commander of the 2nd Indian Cavalry Division in France & Flanders from December 1914 to August 1915. After that he served in Mesopotamia, being mentioned in despatches in October 1916, and from August 1917 to the end of the war on the Staff. He saw service on the North West Frontier in 1930-31 and was mentioned in despatches again. He retired a Lieutenant-Colonel in February 1934.

He commanded the 1st Battalion Ross-shire Home Guard during World War II. He was made Honorary Colonel of the 412th Coast Regiment Royal Artillery (Territorial Army) 1948–51.

Dick-Lauder held the office of Vice-Lieutenant of Ross and Cromarty between 1945 and 1958.*

On 24 February 1914 he married Phyllis Mary (d. 5 April 1976) daughter of Brigadier-General Herbert Augustus Iggulden, C.I.E. They had two sons and one daughter. He died 19 September 1958 at White House, Nigg, Ross and Cromarty, Scotland. The second son, Sir George Dick-Lauder, 12th Baronet succeeded him.

Baronetage of Nova Scotia
Preceded by George Dick-Lauder	Baronet (of Fountainhall); 1936–1958	Succeeded by George Dick-Lauder
