= Aqeel Ahmed =

Aqeel Ahmed may refer to:

- Aqeel Ahmed (director) (born 1987), British film writer and director
- Aqeel Ahmed (cricketer) (born 1982), Pakistani cricketer
- Aqeel Ahmed (boxer) (born 1992), British boxer
- Aqeel Ahmed (colonel) (born 1965), Pakistani colonel
