= Sir Alexander Lauder, 4th Baronet =

Sir Alexander Lauder of Fountainhall, 4th Baronet (6 November 1698 – 17 May 1730) succeeded to the baronetcy of his father, Sir John Lauder, 3rd Baronet in February 1728. He was made an Honorary Burgess of the City of Glasgow on 16 September of that year, and of the burgh of Aberdeen on 15 August 1729. He died unmarried and was interred in the Lauder burial vault within Greyfriars Kirk.

He was succeeded by his next younger brother, Sir Andrew Lauder, 5th Baronet.

Baronetage of Nova Scotia
Preceded by John Lauder	Baronet (of Fountainhall); 1728–1730	Succeeded by Andrew Lauder
