= Pakistan Military Academy =

Pakistani military training academy in Abbottabad, Pakistan

- پاکستان عسکری درسگاہ
- Motto: نَصْرٌ مِّن اللَّهِ وَفَتْحٌ قَرِيبٌ (Quran, 61:13)
- Motto in English: "A triumph from God and a victory that is close at hand"
- Type: Military academy
- Established: 25 November 1947; 78 years ago
- Affiliations: Pakistan Army
- Commandant: Maj Gen Muhammad Bilal
- Academic staff: 3,000–4,000 (both civilian and military)
- Location: Kakul, Abbottabad, Khyber Pakhtunkhwa, Pakistan
- Colours: Green and red
- Website: pakistanarmedforces.com/pakistan-military-academy/

The Pakistan Military Academy (PMA) is a military training institution for cadets seeking commissions in the Pakistan Army. It is located in Kakul, Abbottabad, Khyber Pakhtunkhwa, Pakistan and was established in November 1947. The academy is accredited by the National University of Sciences and Technology (NUST). The academy also trains international students; cadets and officers from 34 countries have trained there.

== History ==
After the partition of British India in 1947, the British Indian Army was divided between the newly created states of India and Pakistan. Brigadier Francis Ingall, an officer of the now split British Indian Army, was selected by Field Marshal Sir Claude Auchinleck to serve as the first commandant of the Pakistan Military Academy.

A site at Kakul was chosen for the academy. The site had previously housed the British Indian Army's Physical Training and Mountaineering School, which also served as an operational facility for the Royal Indian Army Service Corps. The school had been established in a former POW camp used during the Boer War in 1902.

Ingall structured the Pakistan Military Academy on the model of the Royal Military Academy Sandhurst and requested a regimental sergeant major from the Brigade of Guards to assist with training. He received support from several former British Indian Army officers who had transferred to the Pakistan Army, including Lieutenant Colonel Attiqur Rahman and Captain S. G. Mehdi, MC, who served as the first battalion adjudant. Mehdi subsequently commanded Qasim Company at the academy and later served as commander of the special Special Service Group (SSG) of the Pakistan Army.

When the dispute over the accession of Jammu and Kashmir led to armed conflict between India and Pakistan in late 1947, Ingall adapted the Academy's training to the conditions faced by the Pakistan Army to prepare new officers for a largely mountainous and open terrain and to create a new officer class for Pakistan. Ingall was appointed an Officer of the Order of the British Empire (OBE) after completing his term as commandant in 1950. He was later honored with a namesake lecture theater at Kakul, Ingall Hall, constructed after his departure. Ingall kept in touch with the academy for the rest of his life with various visits. During his final visit in November 1997, he said:

"I have given many addresses from this position here, and from 1948 to 1951, I was very keen on the question of Pakistan and believed in it. I believed what the Quaid-e-Azam preached. I believe in Islam".

On 15 October 1947, 67 cadets arrived from the Indian Military Academy (IMA). New cadets for the 1st PMA Long Course (78) and the 1st Graduates Course (63) were selected in Pakistan, and training officially began in January 1948 with 208 cadets. On 25 January of the same year, the First Pakistan Battalion was established. Its four companies were named after prominent figures in Muslim military history: Khalid, Tariq, Qasim, and Salahuddin. In March 1948, the first battalion received the patronage of Quaid-e-Azam Muhammad Ali Jinnah, who became its Colonel-in-Chief, and the battalion was subsequently designated "The Quaid-e-Azam's Own." 1st PMA Adjutant was Captain (later Brigadier) Bashir Ahmed Guides Cavalry.

Khawaja Nazimuddin presented the Quaid-e-Azam banner to the Pakistan Military Academy on behalf of Quaid-e-Azam Muhammad Ali Jinnah, and the banner is hoisted by the champion company during each passing-out parade. Regimental colors were presented to the Academy in 1950 by Liaquat Ali Khan, the first Prime Minister of Pakistan, and the National Standard was presented in 1961 by General Muhammad Musa, then Commander-in-Chief of the Pakistan Army.

The Academy was expanded due to the India–Pakistan war of 1965 with the establishment of the second battalion in December 1965, which consisted of the companies Ghaznavi, Babur, Aurangzeb, and Tipu. The third battalion was founded in early 1989 and consisted of the companies Haider, Ubaida, Saad, and Hamza.

Former COAS General Raheel Sharif inaugurated the fourth Pakistan Battalion at PMA on 10 October 2016.

== Entry process ==
Cadet selection is conducted by the Inter-Services Selection Board (ISSB) through assessment centers across Pakistan. Applicants must pass medical, fitness, and aptitude evaluations to be eligible for admission.

=== Physical requirements ===
Gentlemen Cadets (GCs) are required to pass various physical fitness tests, the standards for which increase each term. The basic requirement for cadets of every term is to be able to complete a one-mile run (1.61 kilometers) in six minutes. The distribution of points is as follow:

1. Under 5:30: 10 points
2. Under 5:35: 9 points
3. Under 5:40: 8 points
4. Under 5:45: 7 points
5. 5:45-5:59: 6 points . Other tests include push-ups, sit-ups, chin-ups, rope test, a five-mile (8 km) run, an assault course, and an exercise known as the "acid test." These tests evaluate the stamina and strength of a cadet.

In the "acid test," cadets begin by traversing a mountain while carrying logs on their shoulders. This is followed by a 14.5 km run in full gear to an obstacle course. Those completing the course are given five rounds to hit a target at a distance of 22 m.

LCs (Lady Cadets) are also required to pass physical efficiency tests similar to those of GCs, but the standards are slightly lower. The basic requirement for all LCs is to run one mile (1.6 km) in 10 minutes or less. Other tests include push-ups, sit-ups, bar hanging, assault course, and an exercise of Qiyadat (leadership) with GCs.

There are several training exercises for cadets, which include:

- First term: Kick off, saluting tests, cross country, Sang-e-Bunyad,
- Second Term: Yarmuk, Pathfinder, and the GCs are required to spend three minutes in the boxing ring.
- Third term: T.M. raiders, Panipat, and assault course are also added as part of the PT tests:
- Fourth Term: Qiyadat and the acid test.

== Battalions and companies ==
For training, the Gentleman Cadets are organized into battalions and then further into companies. The Pakistan Military Academy has 16 companies, named after Islamic warriors and commanders. The companies under the 4th Battalion are named after four out of the eleven recipients of the Nishan-e-Haider, Pakistan's highest military award.

List of companies
1st Battalion (Quaid-i-Azam's own)	2nd Battalion (Quaid-i-Azam's own)	3rd Battalion (Quaid-i-Azam's own)	4th Battalion (Quaid-i-Azam's own)
Khalid	Ghaznavi	Haider	Aziz
Tariq	Babar	Ubaida	Shabbir
Qasim	Aurangzeb	Saad	Akram
Salahuddin	Tipu	Hamza	Sher

== Courses ==
There are five types of courses (or curricular plans) that run parallel to each other. The types of courses are: the PMA Long Course, the Technical Cadet Course, the Integrated Course, and the PMA Lady Cadets' Course.

=== PMA Long Course ===
The PMA Long Course is for regular commissioned officers of combat and combat support arms & services. The Long Course has a duration of two years, which is divided into four terms of six months each. After the 2-year training period, cadets are commissioned as second lieutenants.

=== Technical Cadet Course (TCC) ===
Candidates who wish to join the army as an engineers apply for this course. Candidates are required to have completed 12 years of academic education, including courses in physics, chemistry, and mathematics. Candidates who are successful in all tests conducted for selection are then sent to a NUST institution for a Bachelor of Engineering degree, depending on the field they choose:

Degree	Institution
B.E Civil Engineering	Military College of Engineering
B.E Electrical Engineering	College of Electrical and Mechanical Engineering
B.E Mechanical Engineering	College of Electrical and Mechanical Engineering
B.E Mechatronics Engineering	College of Electrical and Mechanical Engineering
B.E Computer Engineering	College of Electrical and Mechanical Engineering
B.E Electrical Engineering (Telecom)	Military College of Signals
B.E Security Engineering	Military College of Signals
B.E Aeronautical Engineering	College of Aeronautical Engineering
B.E Software Engineering	Military College of Signals

After completing their Bachelor of Engineering degree, the E-Cadets are sent to Pakistan Military Academy, Kakul, for one year of military training, after which they are commissioned as captains in their respective units.

=== Integrated Course (IC) ===
To be eligible for this course, a candidate must have attained 16–18 years of academic education with coursework in physics, chemistry, and biology. Candidates who pass the initial and GHQ Selection Board tests conducted by the army are sent to the Army Medical College for MBBS or for Bachelor of Dental Surgery, after which they undergo basic military training at the Pakistan Military Academy, Kakul, for 22 weeks. Apart from GCs of AM College, IC accepts cadets who are willing to join EME, Signals, RVFC, and Army Education Corps with a minimum master's degree in several fields. The IC has a duration of six months. Cadets graduate as captains.

=== PMA Lady Cadet's Course (LCC) ===
The Lady Cadets' Course was introduced in November 2006 and is designed for FA-qualified women who are professionals in their respective fields. The cadets undergo a training period of six months to become Captains in the supporting arms of the Pakistan Army.

== List of commandants ==
S.N	Name	Start of tenure	End of tenure	Ref.
1	Brig F.H.B Ingall, DSO	4 November 1947	31 December 1950	
2	Brig. G.H Tarvar, DSO	7 June 1951	20 February 1953	
3	Brig. G. Pigot, MC	21 February 1953	18 November 1955	
4	Brig J. H Souter, MC	19 November 1955	7 April 1957	
5	Maj Gen Shoukat Ali Shah	8 April 1957	2 May 1959	
6	Brig Fazal Muqeem Khan, SQA	3 May 1959	17 October 1959	
7	Brig Mohammad Rafi	18 October 1959	29 February 1964	
8	Brig Sultan Mohammad	30 March 1964	14 November 1966	
9	Brig Abubakar Osman Mitha	15 November 1966	23 November 1968	
10	Maj Gen Syed Abid Ali	6 February 1969	1 December 1969	
11	Maj Gen Ijaz Ahmed, SK	2 December 1969	29 April 1970	
12	Maj Gen Riaz Azim, TPk	30 April 1970	10 February 1972	
13	Brig (Later Major General) Abdullah Saeed	11 February 1972	20 November 1974	
14	Brig Zamir Ahmed Khan	21 November 1974	4 June 1976	
15	Brig (Later Lieutenant General) Ahmad Kamal Khan	5 June 1976	15 February 1978	
16	Brig (Later Lieutenant General) Imranuallah Khan	16 February 1978	11 July 1982	
17	Maj Gen Rahat Latif	17 July 1982	4 October 1985	
18	Maj Gen (Later General & Chief of Army Staff) Asif Nawaz	5 October 1985	14 May 1988	
19	Maj Gen (Later Lieutenant General) Ghulam Muhammad Malik	15 May 1988	2 July 1990	
20	Maj Gen (Later Lieutenant General) Lehrasab Khan, SJ	3 July 1990	17 April 1992	
21	Maj Gen (Later Lieutenant General) Muhammad Maqbool	18 April 1992	1 July 1993	
22	Maj Gen Malik Saleem Khan	19 July 1993	22 August 1995	
23	Maj Gen Rizwan Qureshi	23 August 1995	22 April 1997	
24	Maj Gen (Later Lieutenant General) Jamshed Gulzar	23 April 1997	22 November 1998	
25	Maj Gen (Later Lieutenant General) Imtiaz Shaheen	3 December 1998	3 March 2000	
26	Maj Gen (Later Lieutenant General) Shahid Hamid	3 March 2000	4 November 2001	
27	Maj Gen (Later Lieutenant General) Hamid Rabnawaz	5 November 2001	14 October 2004	
28	Maj Gen (Later Lieutenant General) Ahsan Azhar Hayat	1 November 2004	30 April 2006	
29	Maj Gen (Later Lieutenant General) Nadeem Taj	1 May 2006	3 October 2007	
30	Maj Gen (Later Lieutenant General) Zahid Hussain Khan	4 October 2007	12 October 2008	
31	Maj Gen (Later General & Chief of Army Staff) Raheel Sharif	13 October 2008	14 October 2010	
32	Maj Gen (Later Lieutenant General) Mazhar Jamil	15 October 2010	15 May 2012	
33	Maj Gen (Later Lieutenant General) Sadiq Ali	16 May 2012	29 July 2013	
34	Maj Gen (Later Lieutenant General) Nazir Ahmed Butt	30 July 2013	28 October 2014	
35	Maj Gen (later General & Chairman Joint Chiefs of Staff Committee) Nadeem Raza	29 October 2014	10 December 2016	
36	Maj Gen (Later Lieutenant General) Abdullah Dogar	15 December 2016	Oct 2017	
37	Maj Gen (Later Lieutenant General) Akhtar Nawaz	Oct 2017	25 November 2019	
38	Maj Gen (Later Lieutenant General) Muhammad Ali	25 November 2019	25 November 2020	
39	Maj Gen (Now Lieutenant General) Omer Ahmed Bokhari	25 November 2020	Dec 2022	
40	Maj Gen (Now Lieutenant General) Iftikhar Hassan Chaudhary	Jan 2023	Oct 2026	
41	Maj Gen Muhammad Bilal	Oct 2026	present	

== Notable alumni ==
=== Pakistani ===
==== Chairman of the Joint Chiefs of Staff ====
- General Rahimuddin Khan, Gentleman Cadet No. 1, former chairman of the Joint Chiefs of Staff Committee
- General Muhammad Aziz Khan, former chairman of the Joint Chiefs of Staff and Chief of General Staff
- General Ehsan ul Haq, former chairman of the Joint Chiefs of Staff

==== Chief of Army Staff ====
- General Raheel Sharif, former Chief of Army Staff (Pakistan)
- General Ashfaq Parvez Kayani, former Chief of Army Staff (Pakistan)
- General Pervez Musharraf, former Chief of Army Staff and President of Pakistan
- General Jehangir Karamat, former Chief of Army Staff (Pakistan) and Ambassador to the US
- General Abdul Waheed Kakar, former Chief of Army Staff (Pakistan)
- General Asif Nawaz Janjua, former Chief of Army Staff (Pakistan)
- General Mirza Aslam Beg, former Chief of Army Staff (Pakistan)

=== Others ===
- Major Shabbir Sharif, NH
- Major Muhammad Akram, NH
- Captain Karnal Sher Khan, NH
- Major Aziz Bhatti, NH
- Brigadier Tariq Mehmood, SJ
- General Ahsan Saleem Hayat, former Vice Chief of Army Staff
- General Tariq Majid, former Supreme Commandant of the Pakistan Defence Forces and Chairman of the Joint Chiefs of Staff
- Colonel Aqeel Ahmed, SI(M), psc, MSc. Corps of EME, Secretary, Heavy Industries Taxila Board
- Colonel Ahsan Malik, SJ

=== Alumni who defected to Bangladesh ===
Several officers trained at the PMA would join Bangladesh during the Bangladesh Liberation War or afterwards.

- Major General K.M. Shafiullah, the Bangladesh Army's first chief in 1972
- Lieutenant General Ziaur Rahman, President and Chief of Army Staff, Bangladesh
- Colonel Shafaat Jamil, brigade commander of 46th Independent Brigade in the early 1970s, Bangladesh Army
- Major General Khaled Musharraf, Chief of Army Staff, Bangladesh Army
- Lieutenant General Hasan Mashhud Chowdhury, Chief of Army Staff, Bangladesh Army
- Lieutenant Colonel Abu Taher, Bangladeshi military officer and leader of the Biplobi Shainik Sangstha

=== International alumni ===
- Major General Tunde Idiagbon, former chief of staff, Supreme Headquarters (de facto Vice President of Nigeria) from 1983 to 1985
- General Srilal Weerasooriya, former commander of the Sri Lanka Army and Ambassador to Pakistan

== Gallery ==
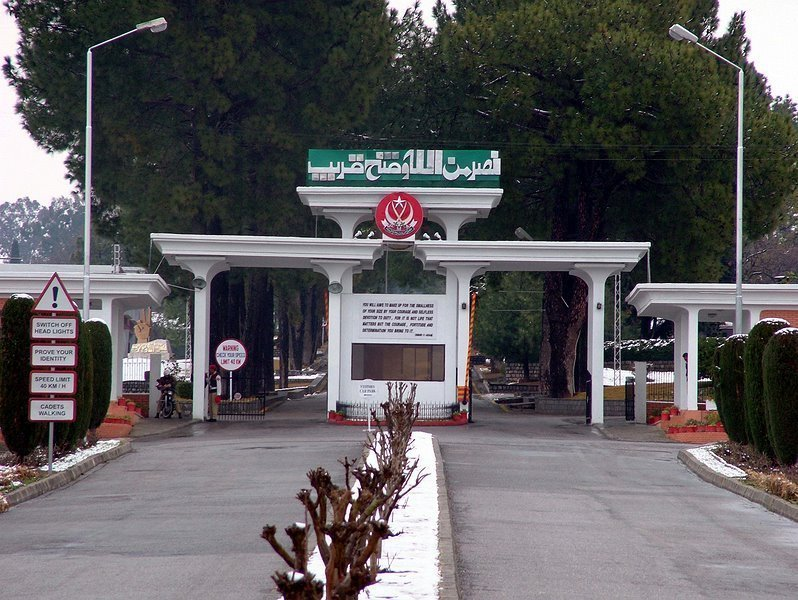
The main gate of the Pakistan Military Academy from a close distance

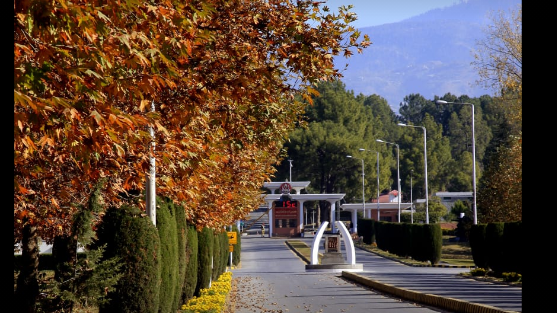
Pakistan Military Academy Entrance Gate from a longer distance

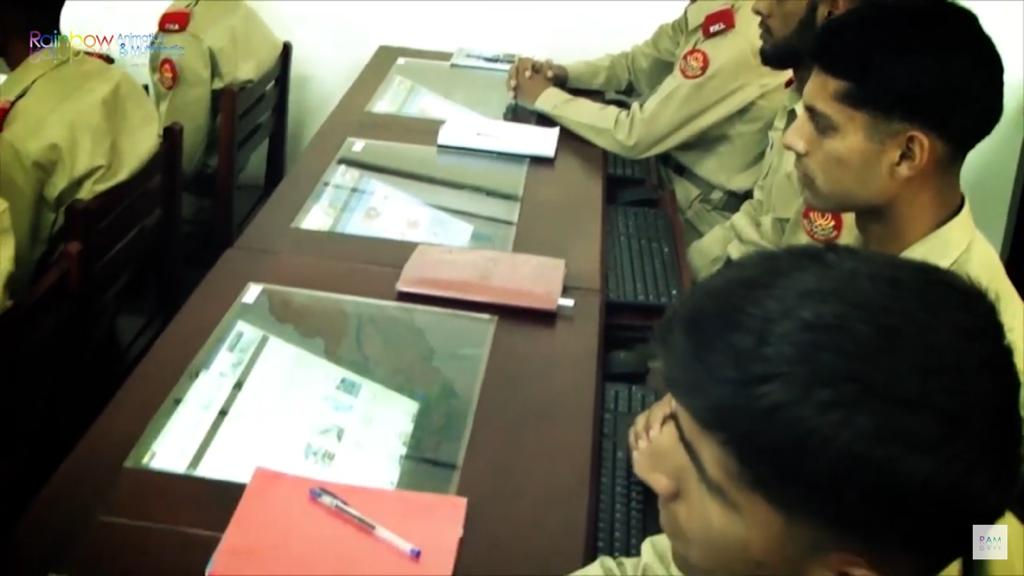
Classroom

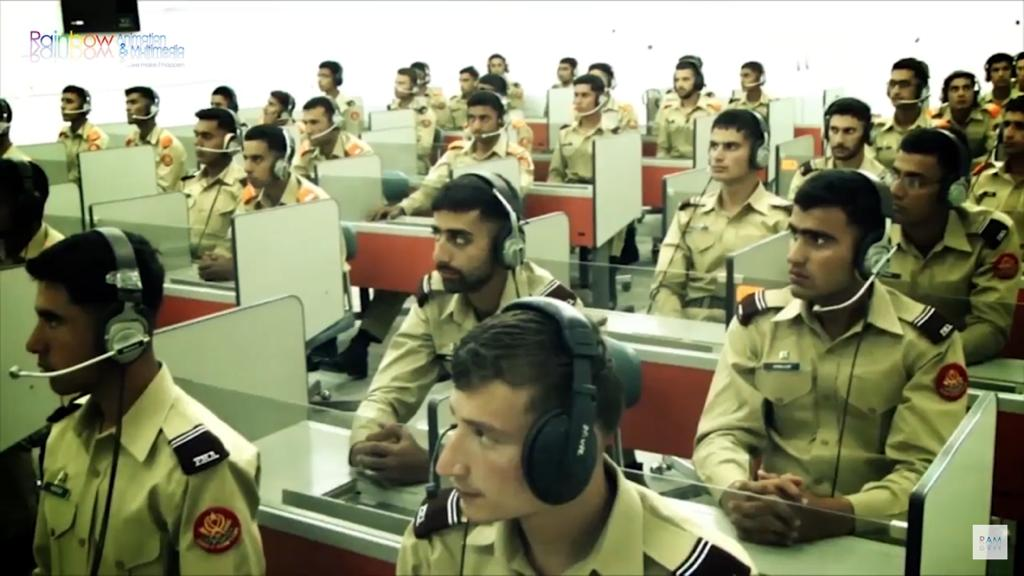
Language Lab

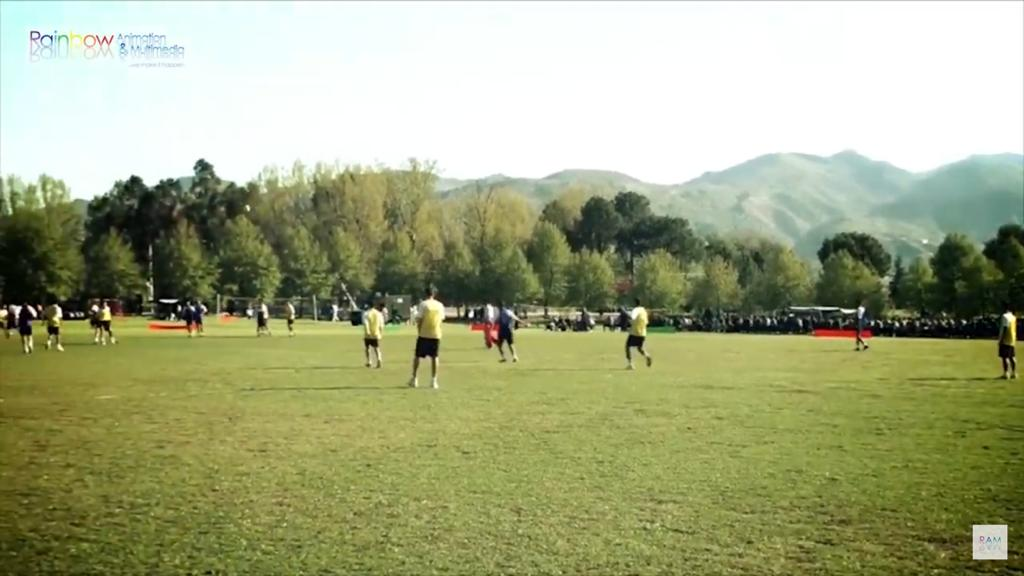
Football Ground

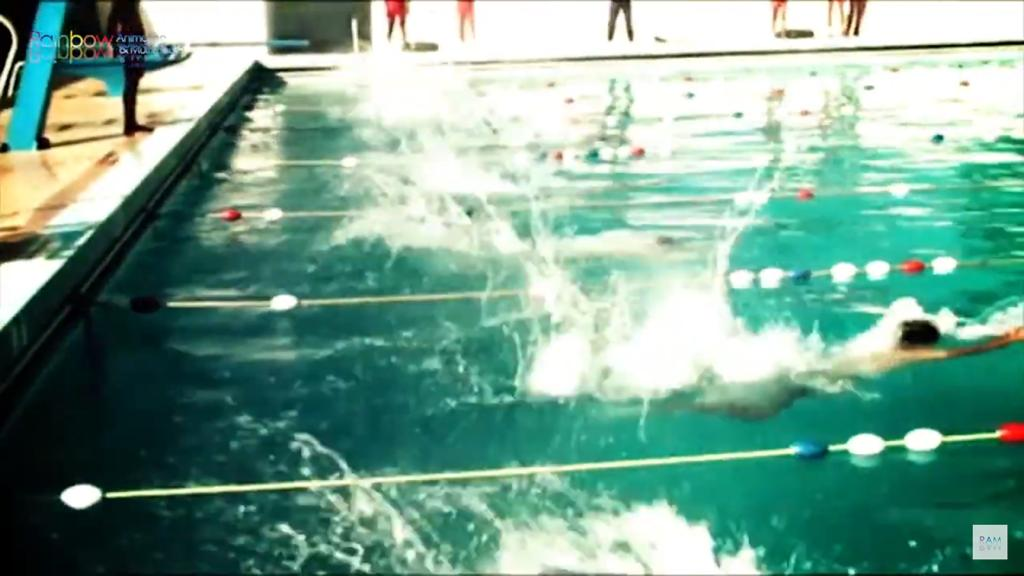
Swimming Pool

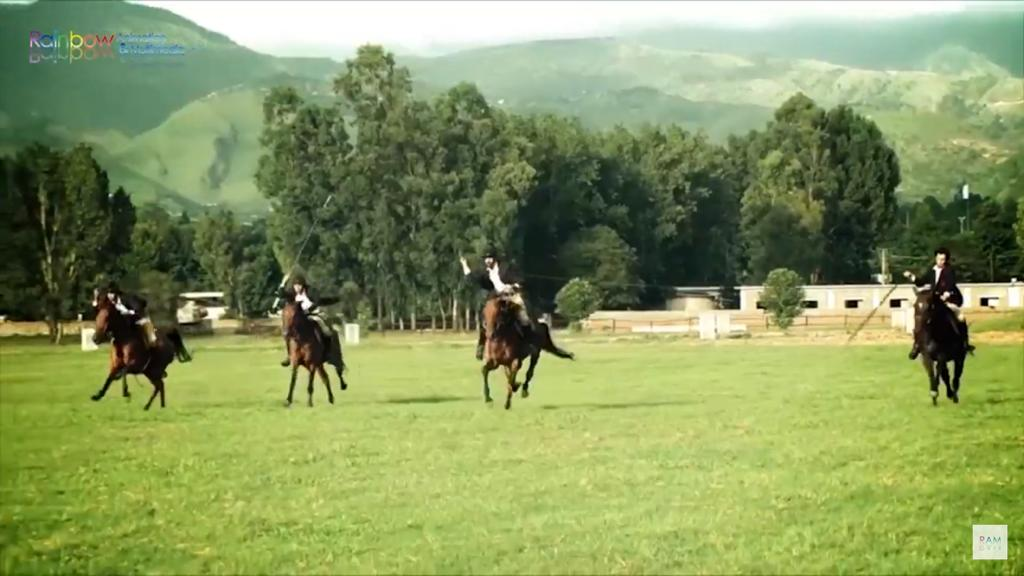
Polo Ground

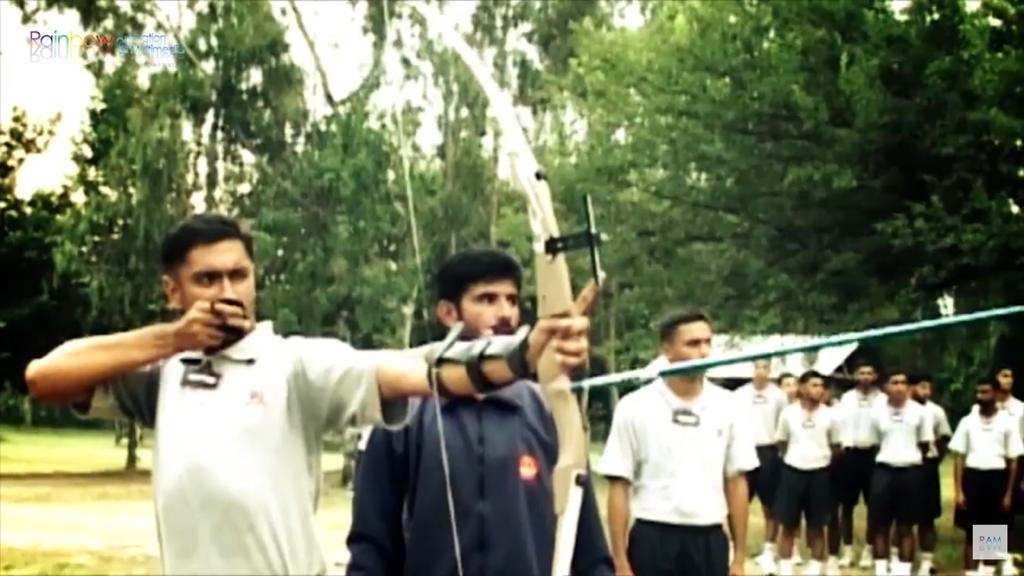
Archery

== Media ==
- "PMA Passing Out Parade 29 April 2023". 29 April 2023 – via YouTube.

== See also ==
- National Defence University
- Military academies in Pakistan
- Sword of Honour (Pakistan)
