= Thomas Dick Lauder =

Scottish author (1784–1848)

Sir Thomas Dick Lauder, after Robert Scott Lauder

Sir Thomas Dick Lauder of Fountainhall, 7th Baronet, FRSE FSA (Scot) LLD (13 August 1784 – 29 May 1848) was a Scottish author. He served as Secretary to the Board of Manufactures (1839–), on the Herring Fisheries Board, at the Royal Institution for the Encouragement of the Fine Arts, and as Deputy Lieutenant of both counties of Moray and Haddington.

He was the only son of Sir Andrew Dick-Lauder, 6th Baronet, whom he succeeded in 1820.

== Early life ==
Lauder was born in Edinburgh on13 August 1784, the son of Elizabeth (née Brown) and Sir Andrew Lauder, 6th Baronet of Fountainhall. He was baptised 8 days later at Pencaitland, near the family's East Lothian seat, Fountainhall. In early life he entered the army – 79th (The Queen's Own Cameron Highlanders) Regiment of Foot, and although possessing Fountainhall he afterwards took up his residence at his wife's home, 'Relugas' in Morayshire, where he remained till 1832 (selling it in 1836), when he removed to the Grange House, in the Grange, Edinburgh until his death.

In 1839 Sir Thomas was appointed Secretary to the Board of Manufactures and Fisheries in Scotland, and also, immediately afterwards, Secretary to the Board of British White Herring Fishery. The duties of these Secretaryships he continued sedulously to discharge till interrupted by his last illness. He was for some time Secretary to the Royal Institution for the Encouragement of the Fine Arts, an office which he relinquished about two years before his death. He was a Fellow of the Royal Society of Edinburgh, where he presented his paper on Parallel Roads of Glen Roy on 2 March 1818.

== Family ==
On 8 February 1808 he married, on the banks of the Findhorn at Edinkillie, Morayshire, Charlotte Anne (1785–1864), the only child and heiress of George Cumin of Relugas. They had eight daughters and two sons.

== Politics ==
With his close friend Henry Thomas Cockburn, Lord Cockburn, Sir Thomas was an active Liberal, and took a keen interest in politics. In 1832 he presided over a huge meeting of some 30,000 people rallying in favour of the Reform Bill at St. Anne's Yards, the field immediately to the east of Holyroodhouse – said to be the largest ever political rally ever held in Scotland.

== Works ==
Sir Thomas and his family were close friends of Sir Walter Scott. His first contribution to Blackwood's Magazine in 1817, entitled Simon Roy, Gardener at Dunphail, was ascribed by some at first to Sir Walter Scott. His paper (1818) on The Parallel Roads of Glenroy, printed in vol. ix. of the Transactions of the Royal Society of Edinburgh, first drew attention to the phenomenon in question.

In 1825 and 1827 he published two romances, Lochandhu and The Wolf of Badenoch. He became a frequent contributor to both Blackwood's Magazine and Tait's Magazine, and in 1830 he published An Account of the Great Floods in Morayshire in 1829 in the Province of Moray and adjoining Districts which he illustrated with engravings of his beloved but greatly damaged Highland retreat, Relugas house.

About this time he was befriended by (and in 1829 took pains to promote) the Sobieski Stuart brothers, eventual publishers, in 1842, of the disputed Vestiarium Scoticum. Lauder agreed to transcribe the famous Cromarty MS which remained in the possession of his family until 1936, when it was presented to Queen Mary. It is now in the Royal Library at Windsor Castle. With it is a letter in which the donor states that the book was 'given' to Sir Thomas "by the Sobieski-Stuart brothers, Ian and Charles Edward". Sir Thomas and Sir Walter Scott corresponded on this MS at length. A full transcript of the Cromarty MS can be found in Stewart & Thompson's book, Scotland's Forged Tartans, which deals mainly with the Vestiarium and their opinions on it.

According to the authoritative Complete Baronetage, vol.14, page 360, note a (on the authority of the late E.R. Stodart, Lyon Clerk Depute [1863-86]) 'he claimed to be descended from the family of Lauder of Bass, but utterly failed to prove such descent. Thereupon he set up a monument to the Lauder family in the Greyfriars Churchyard, Edinburgh, stating thereon the pedigree as he wished it to be'.

Some subsequent works of Sir Thomas were Highland Rambles, with Long Tales to Shorten the Way (2 vols. 8 vo, 1837), Legendary Tales of the Highlands (3 vols. 12mo, 1841), Tour round the Coasts of Scotland (1842), and was asked by Queen Victoria to write the official history of her visit, entitled Memorial of the Royal Progress in Scotland (1843). Volume One of a Miscellany of Natural History, published in 1833, was also partly prepared by Lauder. An unfinished series of papers, written for Tait's Magazine shortly before his death, was published under the title Scottish Rivers, with a preface by John Brown, MD., in 1874.

== Death ==
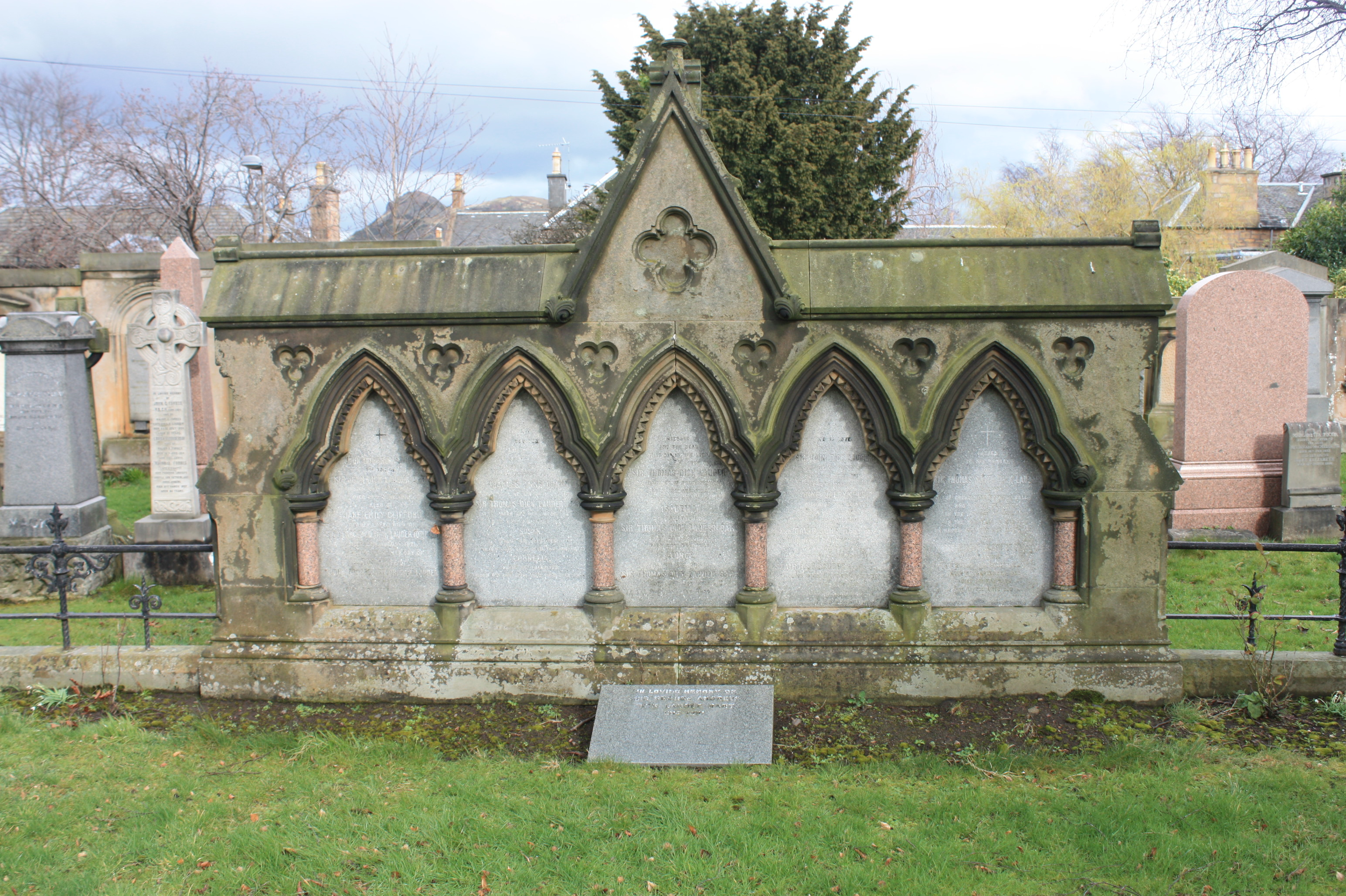
The Dick Lauder family plot, Grange Cemetery, Edinburgh

He died on Monday 29 May 1848, at Grange House, and was buried in a newly created family plot in the then new cemetery at Grange, Edinburgh. The plot lies exactly half way along the eastern path and forms the focal point of the high path over the central vaults. Its small scale however is not dominant in the view.

He was succeeded by his eldest son and heir, Sir John Dick-Lauder, 8th Baronet.

== Lauder tartan ==
The Lauder tartan first appears, it would seem, about this time, in the Vestiarium Scoticum amongst the "bordour clanns". It can be found in The Tartans of the Clans and Septs of Scotland by W. & A.K.Johnston, Edinburgh, 1906.

== Notes ==
Baronetage of Nova Scotia
Preceded by Andrew Dick-Lauder	Baronet (of Fountainhall); 1820–1848	Succeeded by John Dick-Lauder
