= Francis Ingall =

British Indian Army officer (1908–1998)

- Born: 24 October 1908; Oxted, England
- Died: 21 August 1998 (aged 89)
- Military career
- Allegiance: United Kingdom; British India; Pakistan
- Branch: British Indian Army; Pakistan Army
- Service years: 1927–51
- Rank: Brigadier
- Commands: Indian Army Armoured Corps; Pakistan Military Academy (1947–50); 6th Duke of Connaught's Own Lancers (1945)
- Conflicts: North-West Frontier; Second World War
- Awards: Distinguished Service Order; Officer of the Order of the British Empire; Mentioned in Despatches

Brigadier Francis Herman Barclay Ingall, DSO, OBE (24 October 1908 – 21 August 1998) was a British Indian Army officer. He was the founding commandant of the Pakistan Military Academy.

Francis Ingall was born on 24 October 1908 in Oxted, Surrey, and was educated at Hurstpierpoint.

In 1927, he joined the Royal Military College, Sandhurst, and was commissioned as a second lieutenant onto the Unattached List of the British Indian Army on 31 January 1929. After arriving in British India, he was attached to the 2nd battalion of the Essex Regiment on 23 March 1929. On 23 April 1930 he transferred to the Indian Army and joined the 6th Lancers, which had descended from regiments of Bengal Lancers of the Bengal Army. Ingall saw action in the North-West Frontier Province during 1930–31.

He transferred to the Army Remount Department, India on 21 September 1934 and was appointed permanently in early 1938, serving as the Assistant Remount Officer, Sargoda Remount Depot (1934–36). Later he served Shahpur Area (1937–38) and Shahpur Remount Depot (1939–40).

During the Second World War, Ingall was the commandant of the Indian Armoured Corps Officer Training School at Ahmednagar in India. He later rejoined the 6th Lancers and participated in the Italian campaign. He was the second in command and in 1945 temporarily commanded 6th Lancers. During the Italian Campaign, he was Mentioned in Despatches and awarded the Distinguished Service Order.

In 1947, Ingall became the founder Commandant of the Pakistan Military Academy and continued to remain so till 1951. He was appointed an Officer of the Order of the British Empire by the British Government for his vital service to Pakistan by founding Pakistan Military Academy.

He officially retired from the British Indian Army a major on 1 January 1949, but remained on the Special List (Ex-Indian Army) British Army while employed with Pakistan Armed Forces. He ceased to be employed with Pakistan Armed Forces on 18 April 1951 and was appointed honorary brigadier on the same date.

Later he migrated to the United States. In 1982, he was appointed the Honorary Consul General of Pakistan in California, United States. His autobiography The Last of the Bengal Lancers was published in 1988.

He died on 21 August 1998.

== Notes ==
- Obituary
- Indian Army List (various dates)
