= Sir George Dick-Lauder, 10th Baronet =

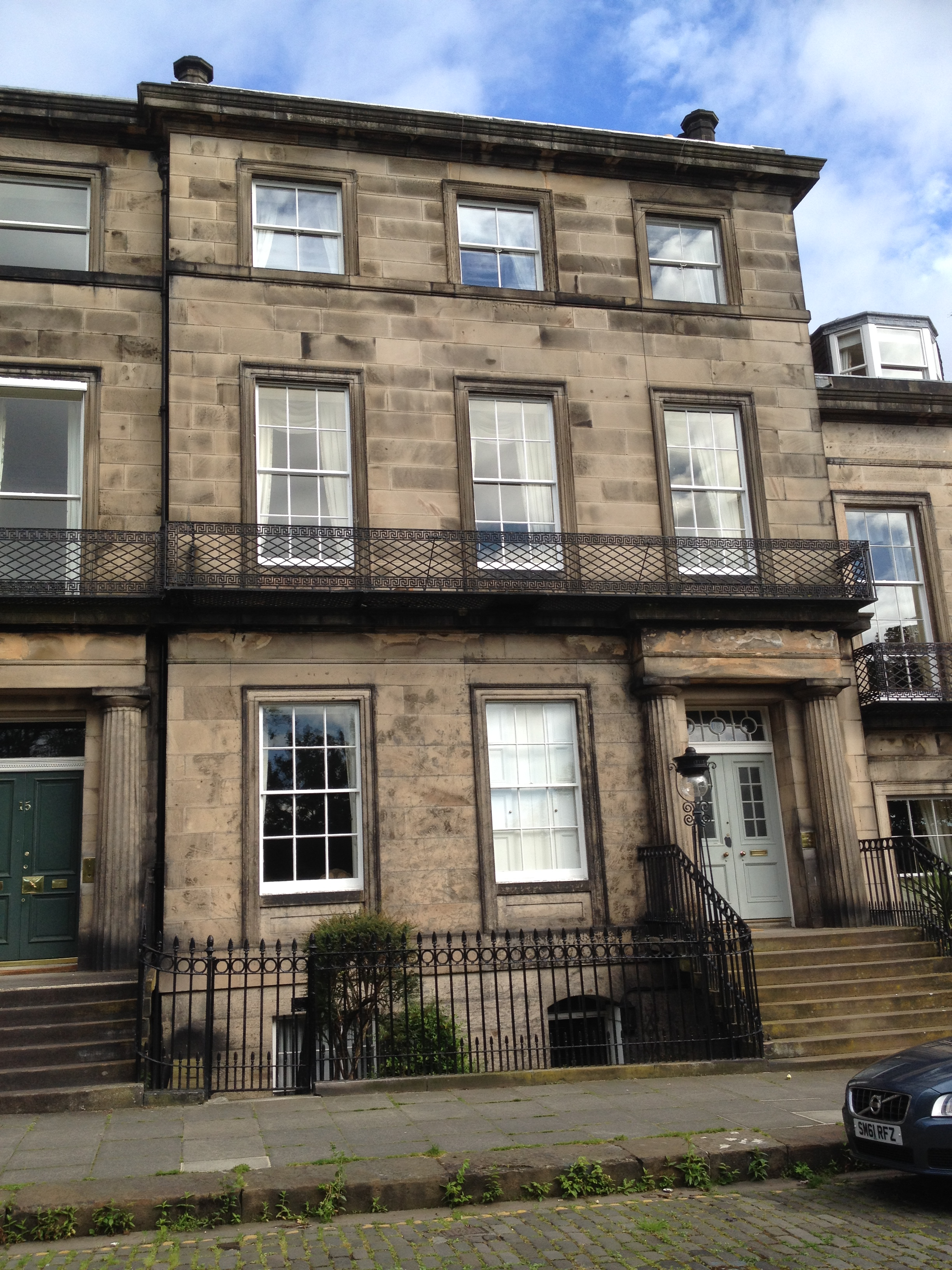
16 Regent Terrace, Edinburgh

Sir George William Dalrymple Dick Lauder of Fountainhall, 10th Baronet (4 September 1852 – 7 May 1936) was an Indian Civil Service Senior Administrator in the Government of India's Opium Department.

He was the third son of Sir John Dick-Lauder, 8th Baronet. Before succeeding to the baronetcy and Fountainhall Manor, he and his wife lived at Gorton House, Hawthornden, near Edinburgh. He also inherited Villa Lauder, at 16 via St Leonardo, Florence, Italy, from his brother who had died there and whom he succeeded in 1919.

Sir George was the last of his family to hold as proprietor and feudal baron the lands and manor house of Grange, Edinburgh, which the Edinburgh Corporation required for the relentless urban sprawl. His heirs had huge death duties to meet upon his death and the Grange was sold to developers and demolished for housing.

Sir George was a member of the New Club, and died at 16 Regent Terrace, Edinburgh, Scotland.

In 1882, Sir George married Jane Emily Clifford (died 22 August 1921), daughter of W P Woodward, Esq., of the Indian Civil Service. They had one son and heir: Sir John Dick-Lauder, 11th Baronet.

Baronetage of Nova Scotia
Preceded by Thomas Dick-Lauder	Baronet (of Fountainhall); 1919–1936	Succeeded by John Dick-Lauder
