= John Watson (Indian Army officer) =

British general and Victoria Cross recipient

Sir John Watson VC GCB
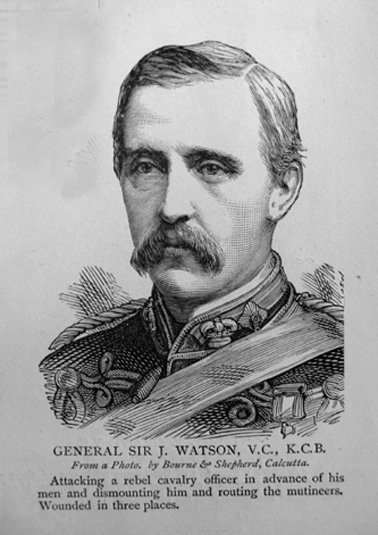
- Born: 6 September 1829; Chigwell, Essex
- Died: 23 January 1919 (aged 89); Finchampstead, Berkshire
- Burial place: St James Churchyard, Finchampstead
- Military career
- Allegiance: United Kingdom
- Branch: Bengal Army; British Indian Army
- Service years: 1848–?
- Rank: General
- Commands: 4th Sikh Irregular Cavalry
- Conflicts: Second Anglo-Sikh War; Indian Mutiny; Second Anglo-Afghan War; Umbeyla Campaign
- Awards: Victoria Cross

General Sir John Watson, VC, GCB (6 September 1829 – 23 January 1919) was an English recipient of the Victoria Cross, the highest and most prestigious award for gallantry in the face of the enemy that can be awarded to British and Commonwealth forces. An officer serving with the Bengal Army, Watson received his Victoria Cross for actions at Lucknow during the Indian Mutiny. He later rose to the rank of general in the British Indian Army.

== Early life ==
Watson was born on 6 September 1829 in Chigwell, Essex. His father was William George Watson. In 1848, at the age of 19, Watson travelled to London seeking to join the army of the British East India Company. Joining the Bengal Army as an officer he was initially sent to Madras. This offered little prospect of action, however, and Watson sought transfer to Bombay.

His first combat action came in December 1848 during the Second Anglo-Sikh War when Watson took part in the Siege of Multan, while serving with the 1st Bombay European Fusiliers. Shortly afterwards he took part in the Battle of Gujrat. By the early 1850s, he was adjutant of the 1st Punjab Cavalry, when Lieutenant, later Field-Marshal, Frederick Roberts observed that Watson "was looked upon as one of the most promising officers of the Frontier Force."

== Victoria Cross details ==
Watson was 28 years old, and a lieutenant in the 1st Punjab Cavalry, Bengal Army during the Indian Mutiny when the following deed took place on 14 November 1857 at Lucknow, India, for which he was awarded the VC:

Lieut. Watson, on 14 Nov., with his own squadron, and that under Captain, then Lieut. Probyn, came upon a body of the rebel cavalry. The Ressaldar in command of them – a fine specimen of the Hindustani Mussalman – and backed up by some half-dozen equally brave men, rode out to the front. Lieutenant Watson singled out this fine-looking fellow and attacked him. The Ressaldar presented his pistol at Lieut. Watson's breast at a yard's distance and fired, but most providentially without effect; the ball must have by accident previously fallen out. Lieutenant Watson ran the man through with his sword and dismounted him; but the native officer, nothing daunted, drew his tulwar, and with his sowars renewed his attack upon Lieutenant Watson, who bravely defended himself until his own men joined in the melee, and utterly routed the party. In this rencontre Lieutenant Watson received a blow on the head from a tulwar, another on the left arm, which severed his chain gauntlet glove, a tulwar cut on his right arm, which fortunately only divided the sleeve of his jacket, but disabled the arm for some time; a bullet also passed through his coat, and he received a blow on his leg which lamed him for some days afterwards.

== Later military career ==
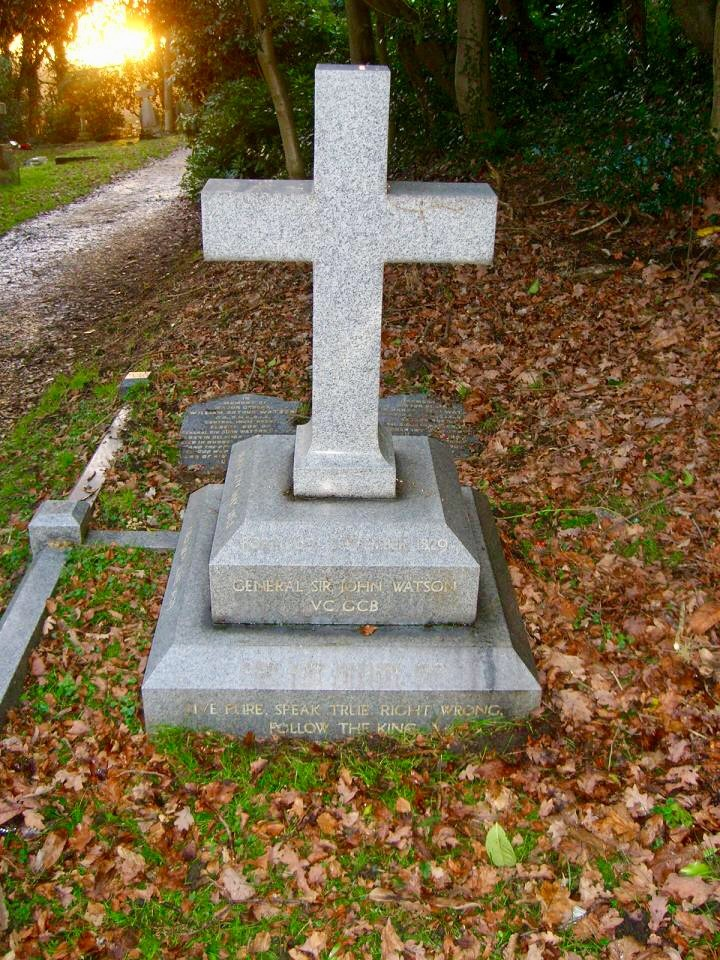
Grave in the churchyard of St James, Finchampstead

Following this, Watson took part in further fighting around Cawnpore and then the Relief of Lucknow. After this he returned to England briefly on convalescence leave before returning to India. In 1858, he raised the 4th Sikh Irregular Cavalry which later became the 6th Duke of Connaught's Own Lancers (Watson's Horse). He later took part in the Umbeyla Expedition (1863) and commanded the Central India Horse, 1871. He became Resident at Gwalior, 1877; Officiating Adjutant-General in Central India, 1871; commanded the Cavalry despatched from Bombay to Malta, 1878; and then commanded the Punjab chief's contingent of the Kurram Valley Field Force in the Second Anglo-Afghan War (1879–80). In 1891 he was promoted to the rank of general.

Watson also served in a number of other roles, including Aide-de-Camp to Her Majesty Empress Victoria, 1870–71 and the Agent to the Governor-General at Baroda from 1882 until 1886, for which he was subsequently knighted as a Knight Commander of the Order of the Bath (KCB) in 1886. He was promoted to Knight Grand Cross of the order (GCB) in the 1902 Coronation Honours list published on 26 June 1902, and was invested by King Edward VII at Buckingham Palace on 8 August 1902.

He was also made Colonel of the Regiment of the 13th Duke of Connaught Lancers in 1904.

== Death ==
Watson died on 23 January 1919, aged 89, at Finchampstead in Berkshire. His grave lies in the churchyard of St James in the village. His VC is on display in the Lord Ashcroft Gallery at the Imperial War Museum, London.
