= Lauder baronets =

Baronetcy in the Baronetage of Nova Scotia

There has been one baronetcy granted to the Lauder family. The baronetcy of Lauder of Fountainhall, Haddingtonshire, was created for John Lauder, last surviving male representative of the Lauders of that Ilk, a rich merchant-burgess and sometime Treasurer and baillie of the City of Edinburgh Council, and an armiger. He purchased (before 1672) the estate of Newington, Edinburgh, and subsequently (10 June 1681) the lands of Woodhead and Templehall near Pencaitland, which along with others in Edinburghshire and Haddingtonshire, were erected by Crown charter into the feudal barony of Fountainhall on 13 August 1681.

John Lauder was created a baronet in the Baronetage of Nova Scotia on 17 July 1688. The first Letters Patent was successfully contested by his eldest surviving son, Lord Fountainhall, and "reduced", and a second Patent with a new destination issued, dated 25 January 1690; the first Patent was formally annulled in 1692.

== Lauder baronets of Fountainhall, Haddingtonshire ==
Escutcheon of the Lauder baronets of Fountainhall

- Sir John Lauder, 1st Baronet (died 1692)
- Sir John Lauder, Lord Fountainhall, 2nd Baronet (1646–1722)
- Sir John Lauder, 3rd Baronet (1669–1728)
- Sir Alexander Lauder, 4th Baronet (1698–1730)
- Sir Andrew Lauder, 5th Baronet (1702–1769)
- Sir Andrew Dick-Lauder, 6th Baronet (1743–1820)
- Sir Thomas Dick Lauder, 7th Baronet (1784–1848)
- Sir John Dick-Lauder, 8th Baronet (1813–1867)
- Sir Thomas North Dick-Lauder, 9th Baronet (1846–1919)
- Sir George William Dalrymple Dick-Lauder, 10th Baronet (1852–1936)
- Sir John North Dalrymple Dick-Lauder, 11th Baronet (1883–1958)
- Sir George Dick-Lauder, 12th Baronet (17 November 1917 – 11 August 1981)
- Sir Piers Robert Dick Lauder, 13th Baronet, born 3 October 1947 at Nicosia, Cyprus (where his father was an officer serving in the British Army), computer programmer. He has, by his partner Jane Elix (b. 1960, d. 2012), a natural child, Angus Thomas Lauder Elix (born 1996). They also have a foster-daughter, Akira Crease.

The heir presumptive to the baronetcy is Mark Andrew Dick Lauder (born 1951), second and youngest son of the 12th Baronet. He was born in Berlin at the British Military Hospital.

His heir apparent is his only son, Martin Dick-Lauder (born 1976).

== Dick-Lauder coat of arms ==
=== Shield ===
- Quarterly: for Lauder (Lord Fountainhall's Arms of 1699), 1st and 4th: Gules, a griffin rampant within a bordure, Argent; and for Dick, 2nd and 3rd Argent, a fesse, wavy, Azure, between three mullets, Gules.

=== Crests ===
- 1st (for Lauder), a tower, with portcullis down, and the head and shoulders of a sentinel appearing above the battlements, in a watching posture, Proper; 2nd (for Dick) A stag's head, erased, Proper, attired, Or.

=== Supporters ===
- Two lions rampant, Argent

=== Motto of the arms ===
- Ut migraturus habita

=== Mottos of the crests ===
- (Lauder) Turris prudentia custos
- (Dick) Virtute
