= Sir Thomas Dick-Lauder, 9th Baronet =

Sir Thomas North Dick Lauder of Fountainhall, 9th Baronet KStJ (28 April 1846 – 19 June 1919) was a Scottish aristocrat and a Knight of Justice in the Order of St. John of Jerusalem

== Life ==
Thomas North Dick-Lauder was born on 28 April 1846 in Grange House, Grange, Edinburgh. He was the eldest son of Sir John Dick-Lauder, 8th Baronet and Lady Anne Dalrymple, the second daughter of North Dalrymple, 9th Earl of Stair. He was baptised 12 June at St Cuthbert's, Edinburgh. On 27 September 1867 he was served heir to his father.

On 30 December 1869 he was appointed an ensign (by purchase) in the 60th Rifles, and later served for a year (14 April 1869 – 11 April 1870) as a lieutenant in the part-time Edinburgh Militia.

His principal residences were Fountainhall, Pencaitland in East Lothian, and Grange House, Edinburgh. He was a member of the Army and Navy Club, the Junior Carlton Club (both in London) and the New Club in Edinburgh.

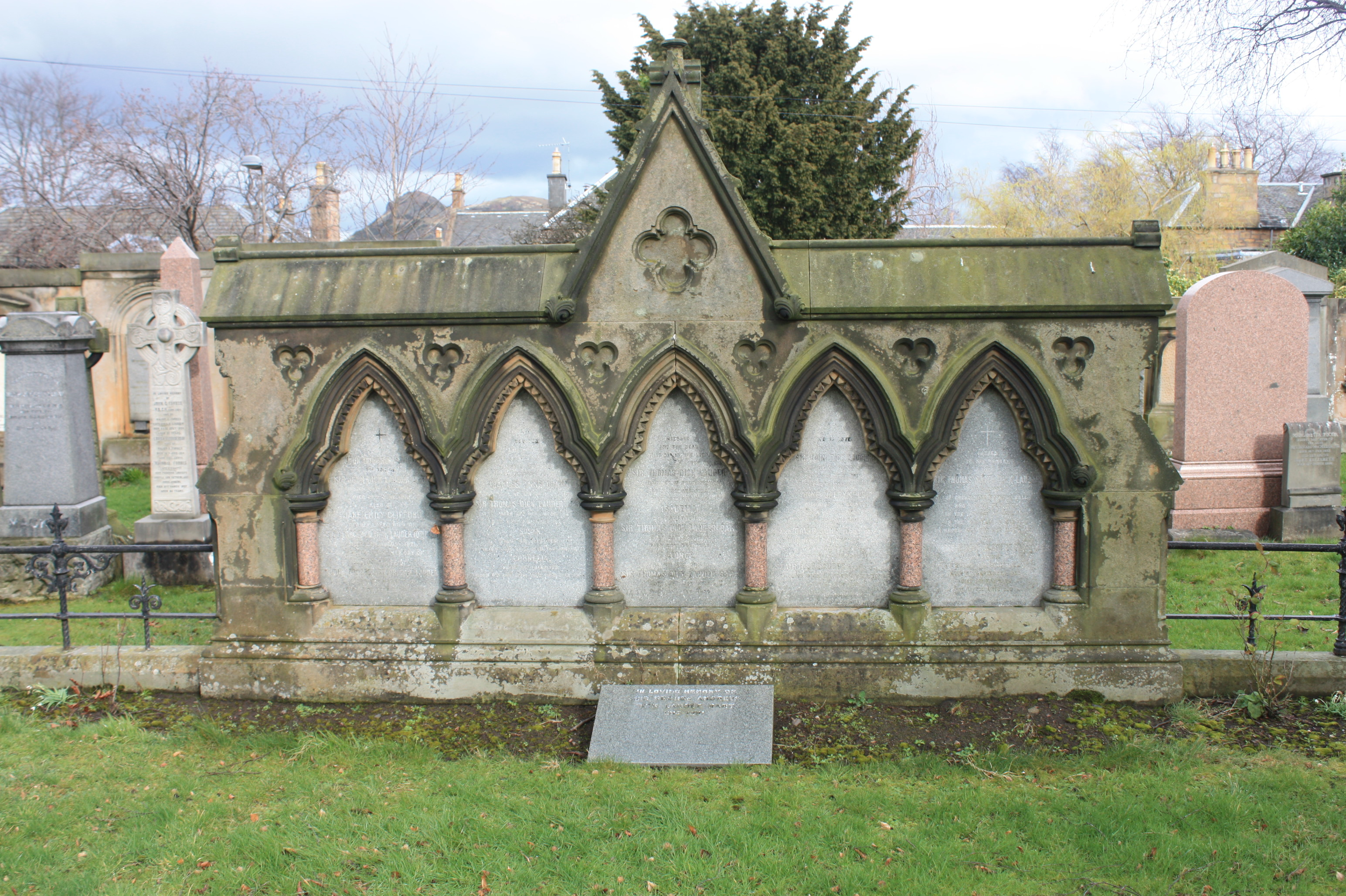
The Dick Lauder family plot, Grange Cemetery, Edinburgh

He died unmarried on 19 June 1919 in Villa Lauder, at 16 Via St. Leonardo, Florence, Italy. He was succeeded in the baronetcy and family estates by his younger brother, Sir George Dick-Lauder, 10th Baronet.

He is buried in the Dick Lauder family plot in the Grange Cemetery in south Edinburgh. The plot lies exactly halfway along the eastern path facing the high path over the vaults.

== Notes ==
Baronetage of Nova Scotia
| Preceded by John Dick-Lauder | Baronet (of Fountainhall); 1867–1919 | Succeeded by George Dick-Lauder |
