= Puffin's Club =

Scottish private luncheon club from 1961

Puffin's is a private members' luncheon club, established in the 1960s by the historian Sir Iain Moncreiffe of that Ilk. Named after his first wife, Diana Hay, 23rd Countess of Erroll (whose nickname was 'Puffin'), it started as an informal social gathering of Scots clan chiefs and aristocrats at Edinburgh.

== History ==
Originally, Puffin's met weekly on Tuesdays or Wednesdays in Edinburgh. It now convenes monthly on a Thursday, both in Edinburgh and London. Membership is strictly by invitation and open only to those whose families fought at the battle of Flodden or "would have had they been there".

It is believed that Puffin's throughout the 1960s and 1970s counted half the crowned heads of Europe in its circle, being variously described as distinguished and eccentric. In addition to former King Zog of Albania, Prince Juan of the Asturias and Archduke Otto von Habsburg (the last Austro-Hungarian Imperial Crown Prince), among other notable members were Prince Giulio Rospigliosi, Don Fernando Fitz-James Stuart, the actor Terence Stamp, writers Sir Patrick Leigh Fermor and Donald Adamson, Sir Nicholas Fairbairn, Sir Donald Cameron, Sir David Stirling, baronets Sir Fitzroy Maclean and Sir George Dick-Lauder, the Duke of Atholl, the Marquesses of Ailsa and of Lothian, ex-British PM Lord Home of The Hirsel, the 10th Earl of Selkirk (whose nephew and brief successor to the earldom, Lord Selkirk of Douglas was also a member), Lord Burton, Lord Dacre of Glanton, Lord Lovat and Lord Strange, who attended from time to time.

Nowadays among its membership are the founder's two sons, the Earl of Erroll and the Hon. Peregrine Moncreiffe of that Ilk, David Campbell Bannerman MEP and former MPs Major Narindar Saroop and Viscount Thurso, and clan chiefs including the Earl of Crawford and the Earl of Lauderdale, savants as well as various businessmen.

== See also ==
- Gentlemen's club
