= Sir George Dick-Lauder, 12th Baronet =

British Army officer and author (1917–1981)

Sir George Andrew Dick Lauder, 12th Baronet of the Fountainhall creation (17 November 1917 – 11 August 1981), was a British author and soldier.

He succeeded to the baronetcy in 1958 on the death of his father Sir John North Dalrymple Dick-Lauder, 11th Baronet.

== Education ==
Dick-Lauder was educated at Stowe and the Royal Military College, Sandhurst. Originally of Fountainhall, his family sold that estate.

== Career ==
He served in the 1939–45 war in Palestine; East Africa; and the Middle East. He also served, with the 52nd Middle East Commandos, in Sudan and Crete (where he was taken prisoner). He entered the Black Watch Regiment as a lieutenant in 1937, and was promoted Major in 1945. He served in Cyprus and Berlin, where his two sons were born, and was promoted second-in-command of the Black Watch (1955 – 1956). He was then seconded as second-in command to the 11th battalion King's African Rifles in Nairobi (1957–1960). He retired from the British Army in 1960.

== Marriage and death ==
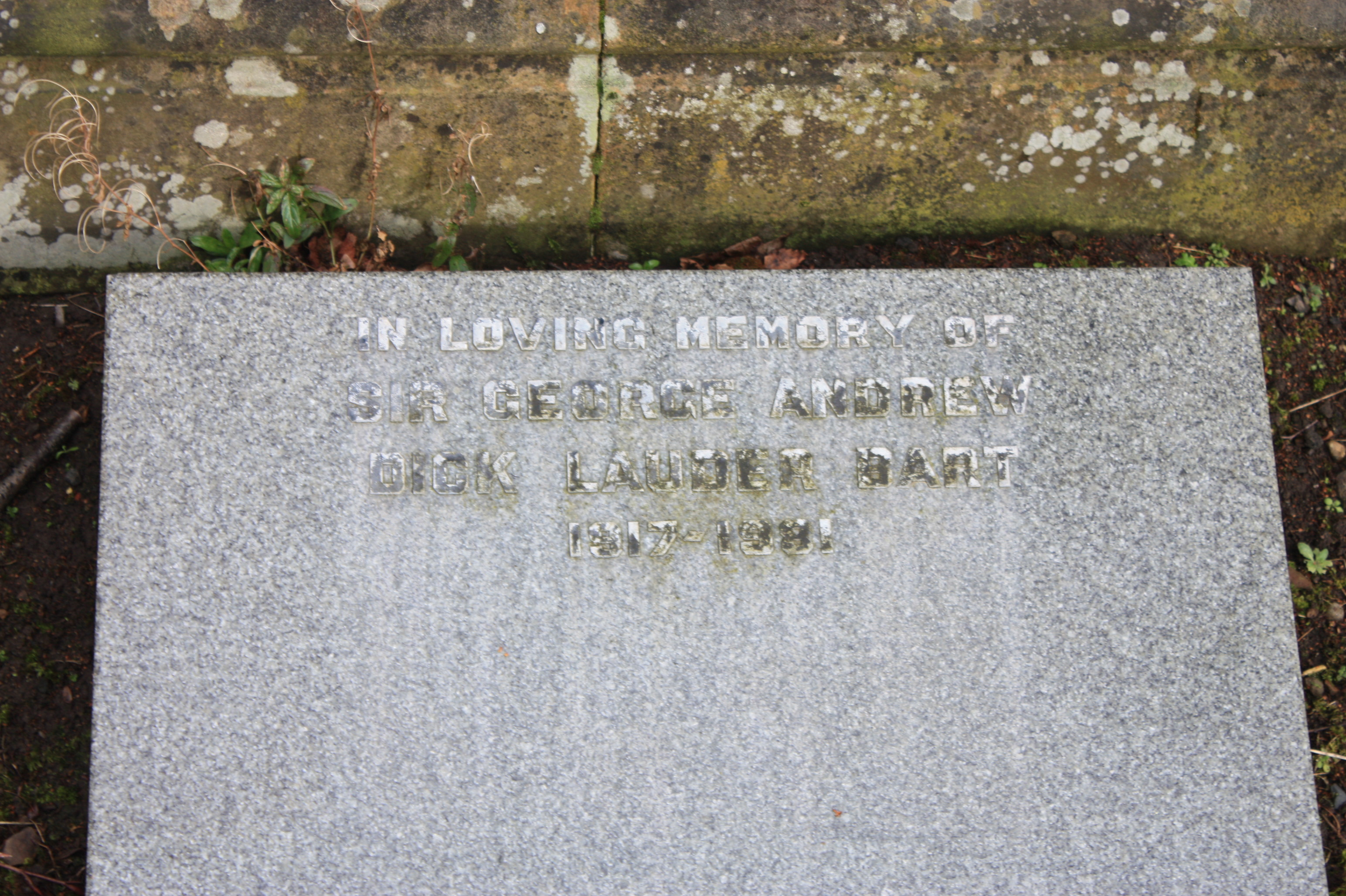
The grave of Sir George Andrew Dick Lauder, Grange Cemetery, Edinburgh

He died at Firth Mill House, Roslin, Scotland, having married on 13 November 1945 Hester Marguerite, daughter of Lieutenant-Colonel George Cecil Minett Sorell-Cameron, C.B.E. They had two sons and two daughters, Lauder being succeeded by his eldest son and heir Sir Piers Robert Dick-Lauder, 13th Baronet.

He is buried in the Dick Lauder family plot in Grange Cemetery in south Edinburgh. The plot lies midway along the eastern path facing the high path.

Lady Dick-Lauder died in 2017.

== Author ==
Lauder was the author of Skull and Two Crystals, Let Soldiers Lust, and Our Man for Ganymede. He was a member of Puffin's Club, Edinburgh, founded by his friend Iain Moncreiffe of that Ilk, 11th Baronet.

Baronetage of Nova Scotia
Preceded by John Dick-Lauder	Baronet (of Fountainhall); 1958–1981	Succeeded by Piers Lauder
