= Andrew Lauder (burgess) =

Sir Andrew Lauder of Fountainhall, 5th Baronet (8 May 1702 – 6 March 1769) was a Burgess of the Royal Burgh of Lauder (1 August 1737), and also of Musselburgh (8 June 1739).

He succeeded to the baronetcy in 1730 upon the death of his elder brother Sir Alexander Lauder, 4th Baronet.

During the Jacobite disturbances in Scotland, notably 1730 and 1745, Sir Andrew was noted as a "government man". During the latter uprising a Warrant was issued at Holyroodhouse dated 18 October 1745, in the name of Charles, Prince of Wales, "Regent of Scotland, England, France, and Ireland" to George Gordon of Beldorny, to proceed to Sir Andrew Lauder's manor at Fountainhall requisitioning his horses ("including his own bay gelding") and pistols and any other arms. Full descriptions of the estate and buildings are given in the Warrant. Prince Charles had already included Sir Andrew in his land-tax levies, for which he personally signed Sir Andrew's receipt, dated 29 September 1745.

In 1731 he married a future heiress, Isabel (1716–1758) daughter of Sir William Leslie Dick (d.1757) 3rd feudal baron of Grange, Edinburgh, who was in a direct descent from the Royal House of Plantagenet.

By his wife, Isabel, Sir Andrew Lauder had eighteen children: 11 boys and 7 girls. Of his sons, William (1739–1763) was an officer in the Honourable East India Company's Bengal Army, dying in Calcutta. Another son, John (1741–1757) was in the navy and died in Spain.

Sir Andrew is interred in the Lauder vault within Greyfriars Kirk and was succeeded by his son, Sir Andrew Dick-Lauder, 6th Baronet.

Baronetage of Nova Scotia
Preceded by Alexander Lauder	Baronet (of Fountainhall); 1730–1769	Succeeded by Andrew Dick-Lauder
