= Sir John Lauder, 1st Baronet =

Scottish baillie

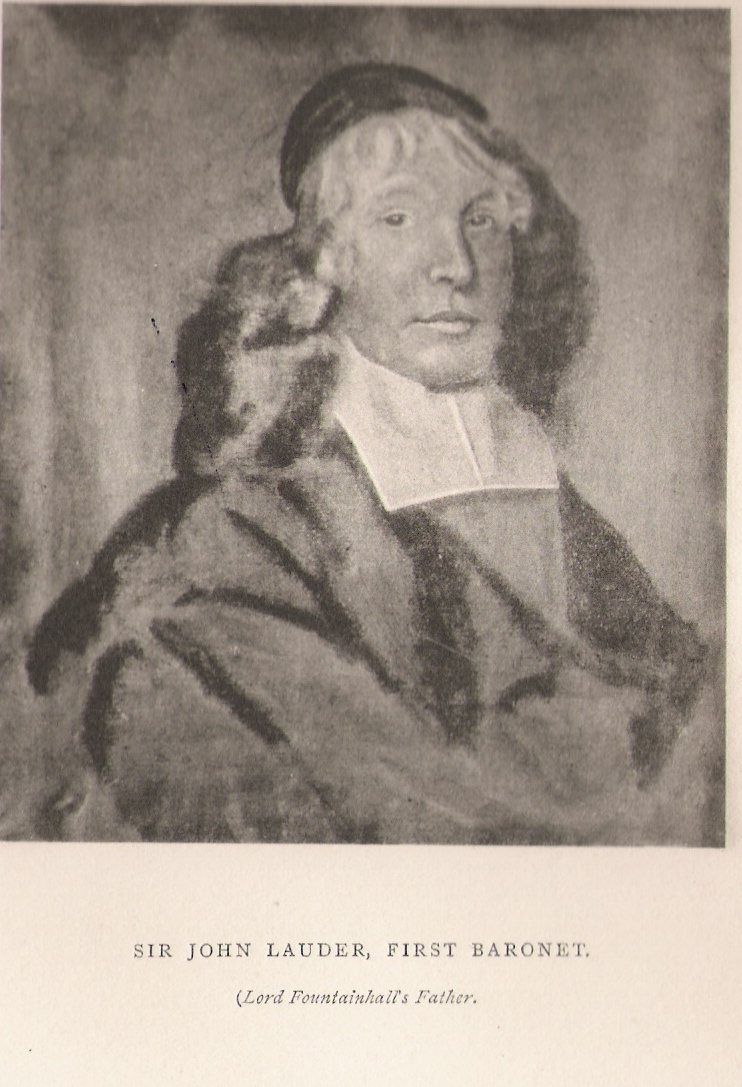
Sir John Lauder, 1st Bt

Sir John Lauder, 1st Baronet, of Newington and Fountainhall (1595 – 2 April 1692) was a notable Scottish baillie and Treasurer of the City of Edinburgh Council, who was raised to a Nova Scotia baronetcy in 1688.

== Antecedents ==
Lauder was born at Melville Mill and baptised 17 August 1595 at Lasswade church, the son of Andrew Lauder of Melville Mill, Lasswade (d. June 1658) and his first wife, Janet (d. April 1617), daughter of David Ramsay of Polton and Hillhead. His son, Sir John Lauder, Lord Fountainhall, recorded his ancestry in his Holograph Notes. He gives the 1st baronet's father as Andrew Lauder, and his father as William Lauder, a "second brother of [Robert] Lauder of that Ilk", sons of Richard Lauder, younger, of that Ilk (k. June 1567).

As John Lauder of Newington he matriculated Arms with the Lord Lyon King of Arms c. 1672 as descended of a second son of Lauder of that Ilk.

== Merchant career and estates ==
Lauder, mentioned in his mother's Testament, became a highly successful merchant-burgess in Edinburgh, being admitted as a Burgess on 23 November 1636. He served as Treasurer of the City of Edinburgh Council in 1652, and as bailie from 1657 to 1661. He purchased (before 1672) the estate of Newington, Edinburgh, and subsequently (10 June 1681) the lands of Woodhead and Templehall, which along with others in Edinburghshire and Haddingtonshire, were erected by Crown charter into the feudal barony of Fountainhall on 13 August 1681. He later purchased the lands of Idingtoun (now Edington) near Chirnside, Berwickshire, from his third father-in-law, George Ramsay of Idingtoun.

== Marriages ==
Lauder married three times: (1) 20 November 1639, at Edinburgh, Margaret (1618–1643) daughter of James Speirs by his wife Catherine née Curie; (2) 17 July 1643 at Edinburgh, Isabel (27 July 1628 – 2 February 1669), daughter of Alexander Ellis of Mortonhall and Stanhopmilnes by his wife Elisabeth, daughter of Nicol Edward, Dean of Guild in Edinburgh; (3) 15 February 1670, Margaret, daughter of George Ramsay of Idingtoun (of the Dalhousie family), by his wife Margaret Seton. After Lauder's death his widow married William Cunninghame, younger of Brounhill, sometime Provost of Ayr.

== Baronetcy ==
On 17 July 1688, he was created a baronet, of Fountainhall, East Lothian in the Baronetage of Nova Scotia, with special remainder to the eldest surviving male heir of his third marriage. This patent was successfully contested and "reduced" (cancelled)

on 19 February 1692 having been replaced on 25 January 1690 with a new Letters Patent altering the succession to include his eldest surviving son from any marriage.

He died on 2 April 1692, in his 97th year and was interred in the Lauder vault within Greyfriars Kirk. He had, in all, twenty-four children by his three wives and was succeeded in the baronetcy by his eldest surviving son (of his second marriage) Sir John Lauder, 2nd Baronet, later Lord Fountainhall.

Baronetage of Nova Scotia
New creation	Baronet (of Fountainhall); 1690–1692	Succeeded by John Lauder
