= John Lauder, Lord Fountainhall =

Scottish jurist

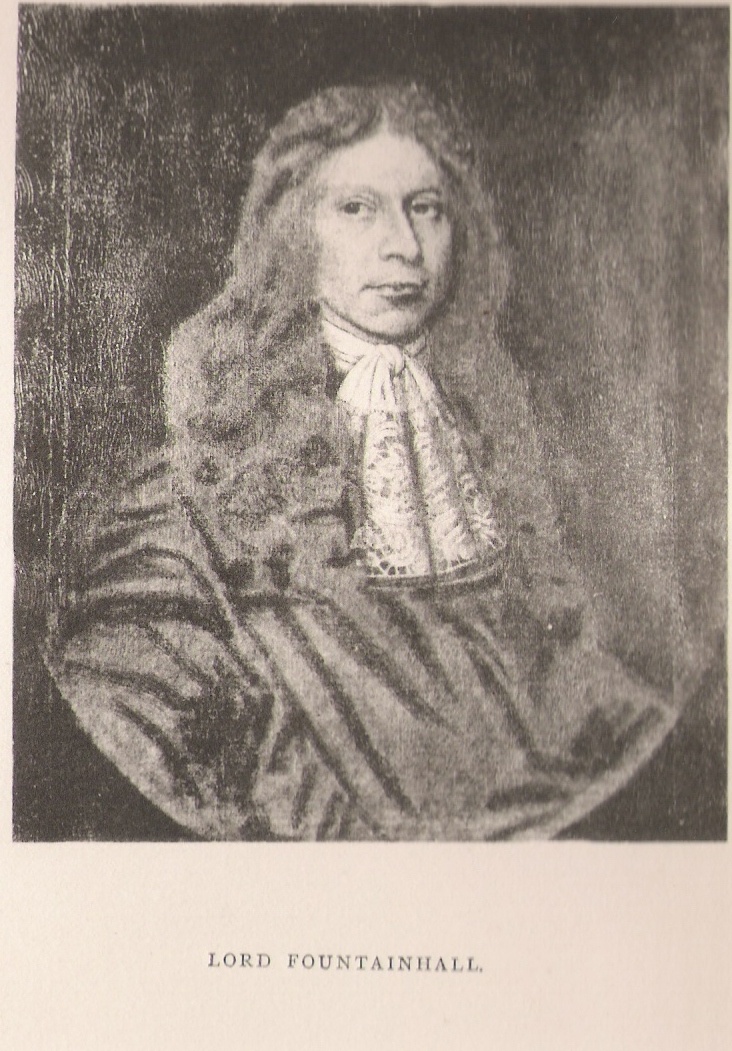
Engraving of Lord Fountainhall from Journals of Sir John Lauder, Lord Fountainhall.

Sir John Lauder of Fountainhall, 2nd Baronet, Lord Fountainhall (baptised 2 August 1646 – 20 September 1722) was one of Scotland's leading jurists who remains an oft-consulted authority. He was knighted in 1680 and matriculated his Arms with the Lyon Court on 15 June 1699.

He gives his name to Fountainhall Close on the Royal Mile in Edinburgh, it being the location of his Edinburgh townhouse.

== Life ==
Lauder was born in Edinburgh, the eldest son, by his second marriage, of Sir John Lauder, 1st Baronet, whom he succeeded after much acrimony. He was educated at the Royal High School, Edinburgh and the University of Edinburgh graduating, with an M.A., on 18 July 1664. He then went to the Continent, partly with the view of studying law there. After some travels, he lived at Poitiers from 28 July 1665 until 24 April 1666, following which he proceeded to Paris, Brussels, Antwerp, and Leyden, Holland, where he matriculated at Leiden University on 27 September 1666.

Lord Fountainhall was admitted as an Advocate on 5 June 1668. He was counsel for the Earl of Argyll at his trial, 12 & 13 December 1681, and was also one of the advocates chosen by the Duchess of Monmouth to defend her interests during her husband's trial on 15 February 1686. He was called to the Bench on 1 November 1689 as a Lord Ordinary in the Court of Session with the title Lord Fountainhall. He was appointed on 27 January 1690 a Lord of Justiciary, which he resigned after the Union of parliaments, which he had opposed.

He lived in buildings on the Lawnmarket, the upper part of the Royal Mile. These were later replaced by the James Court buildings.

In 1692 he was offered the post of Lord Advocate but declined because the condition was attached that he should not prosecute the persons implicated in the Glencoe Massacre. Sir George Mackenzie, who had been Lord Advocate under King Charles II, also refused to concur in five this partial application of the penal laws, and his refusal (unlike Fountainhall's) led to his temporary disgrace.

Sir John was a Justice of the Peace for Haddingtonshire in 1683 and a Burgess of Edinburgh (2 November 1687). He was the Commissioner for Haddingtonshire in Parliament (1685–86, 1690–1707), and spoke several times against the Union.

Lord Fountainhall left a large collection of legal opinions and papers, including some that record Court of Session proceedings from 1678 to 1712, which also note the transactions of the Privy Council of Scotland, and those of the Courts of Justiciary and Exchequer, works compiled with anecdotes of the times and much characteristic ingenuity of observation, to which professional lawyers still turn today.

Lord Fountainhall died at Edinburgh and was interred in the Lauder vault within Greyfriars Kirk. His Testament dated 2 December 1706 was not Proved until more than sixteen years later. He was succeeded in the baronetcy by his son Sir John Lauder, 3rd Baronet.

== Family ==
He married twice:

1. 21 January 1669, at the Tron Kirk, Edinburgh, Janet (1652–1686), daughter of Sir Andrew Ramsay, Lord Abbotshall, 1st Baronet, Lord Provost of Edinburgh and Senator of the College of Justice, (d. 1688), by his wife Janet née Craw. They had six sons (of whom Andrew Lauder, in Edinburgh, and David Lauder of Huntlywood, Berwickshire, were Advocates) and four daughters.
2. 26 March 1687, at Edinburgh, Marion, daughter of the Reverend John Anderson, of Balram, Minister of Dysart. They had three sons and three daughters.

His great-grandson was Gilbert Innes of Stow.

Baronetage of Nova Scotia
Preceded by John Lauder	Baronet (of Fountainhall); 1692–1722	Succeeded by John Lauder
