= 11th Cavalry (Frontier Force) =

Armoured regiment of the Pakistan Army

11th Prince Albert Victor’s Own Cavalry (Frontier Force)
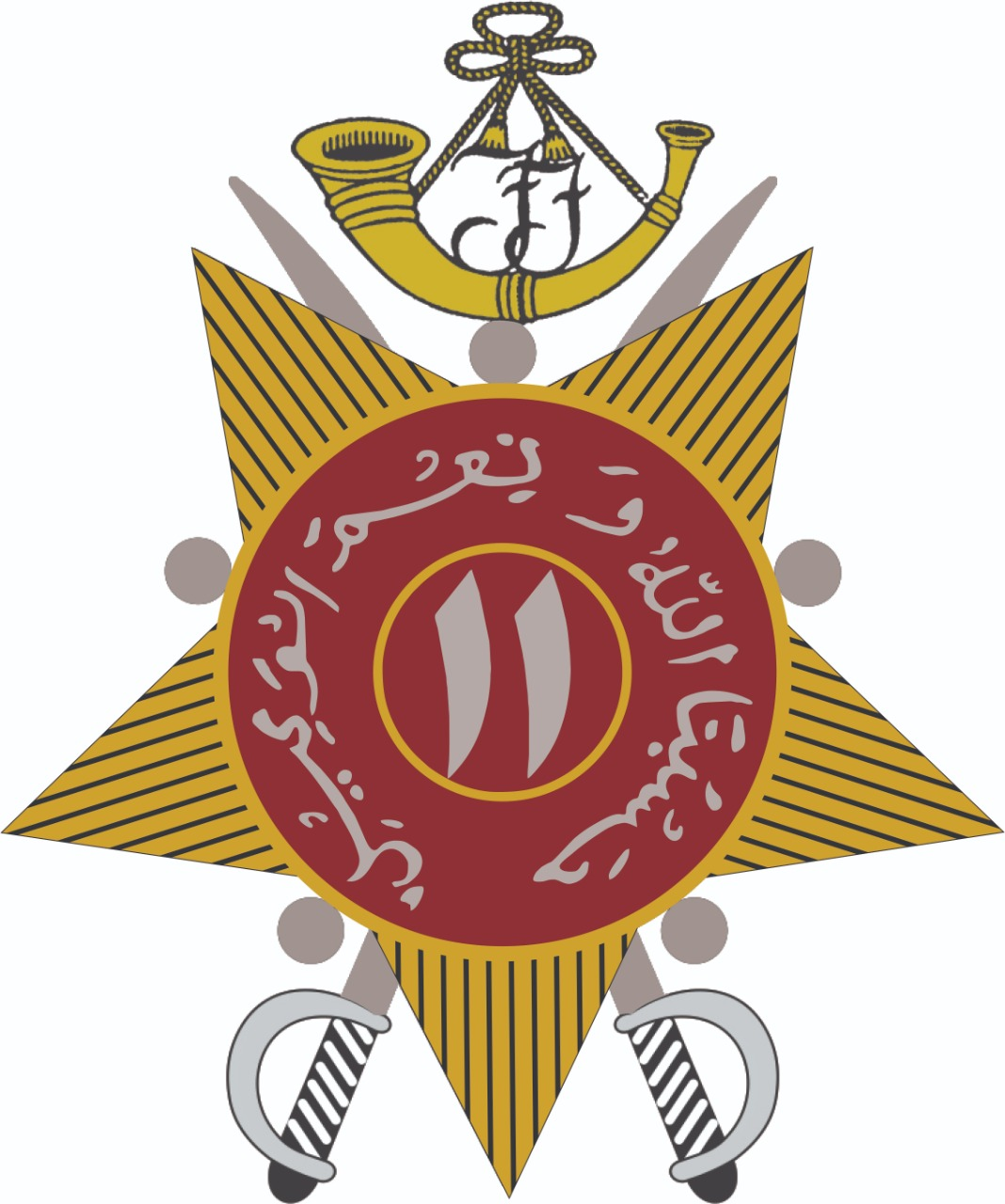
- Insignia since 1974
- Active: 1849–present
- Country: British India (1849-1947); Pakistan (1947-present)
- Branch: British Indian Army; Pakistan Army
- Type: Armoured Regiment
- Size: Regiment
- Nicknames: "PAVO Cavalry" "One One Charlie"
- Engagements: North West Frontier of India; Indian Mutiny of 1857; Second Afghan War 1878–80; First World War 1914–18; Third Afghan War; Second World War 1939–45; Indo-Pakistani War of 1948; Indo-Pakistani War of 1965; Indo-Pakistani War of 1971

Commanders
- Ceremonial chief: Prince Albert Victor
- Notable commanders: John Watson, VC; Charles Egerton; Lord Ismay; Sahabzada Yaqub Khan; Khalid Mahmud Arif; Charles Godwin

The 11th Cavalry (Frontier Force), is an armoured regiment of the Pakistan Army. It was previously known as the 11th Prince Albert Victor's Own Cavalry and was a regular cavalry regiment of the old British Indian Army. It was formed in 1849 and later 21st Prince Albert Victor's Own Cavalry (Frontier Force) and the 23rd Cavalry were amalgamated.

== 21st Prince Albert Victor's Own Cavalry (Frontier Force) (Daly's Horse) ==
The 21st Prince Albert Victor's Own Cavalry (Frontier Force) (Daly's Horse) was raised as the 1st Punjab Irregular Cavalry by Lieutenant Henry Daly at Peshawar on 18 May 1849. It was one of five regiments of Punjab Cavalry raised to guard the North West Frontier of India, which soon became famous as part of the legendary Punjab Frontier Force or the Piffers. Over the next decades, the regiment saw extensive service on the Frontier. During the Indian Mutiny of 1857–58, the regiment operated in North India and took part in the Siege of Delhi and the Relief of Lucknow, where Lieutenant John Watson won the Victoria Cross. During the Second Afghan War of 1878–80, it formed part of Kandahar Field Force and fought in the Battle of Ahmed Khel. In 1890, Prince Albert Victor, Duke of Clarence and Avondale (the elder son of Albert Edward, Prince of Wales and second in line to the British throne) was gazetted as their Colonel-in-Chief, giving his name to the regiment, which has endured to this day. During the First World War, the regiment served in the Mesopotamian Campaign as part of 6th Indian Cavalry Brigade. It fought on the Tigris Front and took part in the capture of Kut al Amara and Baghdad. It also fought in the Actions of Istabulat, Ramadi, Daur and Tikrit. Later it saw service in Kurdistan and took part in the capture of Kirkuk.

- 1849 1st Punjab Irregular Cavalry
- 1851 1st Regiment of Cavalry, Punjab Irregular Force
- 1865 1st Regiment of Cavalry, Punjab Frontier Force
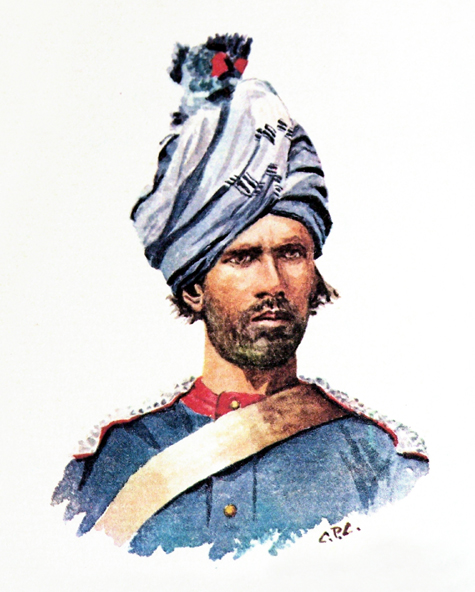
  A sowar of the 1st (Prince Albert Victor's Own) Regiment of Cavalry, Punjab Frontier Force, 1900. Painting by Chater Paul Chater.
- 1890 1st (Prince Albert Victor's Own) Regiment of Cavalry, Punjab Frontier Force
- 1901 1st (Prince Albert Victor's Own) Punjab Cavalry
- 1903 21st Prince Albert Victor's Own Cavalry (Frontier Force)
- 1904 21st Prince Albert Victor's Own Cavalry (Frontier Force) (Daly's Horse)

== 23rd Punjab Cavalry (Frontier Force) ==
The 23rd Cavalry was raised as the 3rd Punjab Irregular Cavalry by Lieutenant WG Prendergast at Lahore in 1849, and it too saw extensive service on the Frontier with the Punjab Frontier Force. During the Second Afghan War, it was part of the Kabul Field Force, and took part in Lord Roberts' famous march from Kabul to Kandahar and fought in the Battle of Kandahar. During the First World War, the regiment served in Mesopotamia as part of the 11th Indian Cavalry Brigade and was part of General Townsend's failed advance towards Baghdad. It then served on the Tigris Front. Later on, it moved to the Euphrates Front and fought in the Battles of Khan Baghdadi and Sharqat. One of its squadrons served in Persian Arabistan. On their return to Indian they saw service in the Third Afghan War of 1919.

- 1849 3rd Punjab Irregular Cavalry
- 1851 3rd Regiment of Cavalry, Punjab Irregular Force
- 1865 3rd Regiment of Cavalry, Punjab Frontier Force
- 1901 3rd Punjab Cavalry
- 1903 23rd Punjab Cavalry (Frontier Force)

== Combined regiment ==
After the First World War, the number of Indian cavalry regiments was reduced from thirty-nine to twenty-one. However, instead of disbanding the surplus units, it was decided to amalgamate them in pairs. This resulted in renumbering and renaming of the entire cavalry line. The 21st and 23rd Cavalry were amalgamated in 1921 to form 11th Prince Albert Victor's Own Cavalry (Frontier Force). The uniform of PAVO Cavalry was blue with scarlet facings. The new regiment's badge consisted of the Kandahar Star representing the five rivers of the Punjab. Its class composition was one squadron each of Punjabi Muslims, Sikhs and Dogras. The regiment was mechanised in 1940. During the Second World War, it initially served in Syria and Iran, and then went on to North Africa, where it fought in the Battle of Gazala. It then moved to Burma, where it greatly distinguished itself against the Japanese. In 1946, the regiment was sent to the Dutch East Indies (Indonesia) to pacify the country after the surrender of the Japanese.

On Partition of India in 1947, PAVO Cavalry was allotted to Pakistan. While travelling to Pakistan, the troops witnessed horrific communal violence, including a Sikh mob in Amritsar publicly abusing and killing captive Muslim women.

The regiment was soon engaged in fighting the Indians in Kashmir. The 11th Cavalry soon joined combat operations in Kashmir. Initially assigned to procure, store, and supply arms, ammunition, and explosives for the Azad Forces—a mix of armed local civilians, ex-servicemen, and Tribal Lashkars from the North-West Frontier Province—the regiment later conducted a successful ambush on a convoy moving from Naushera to Kotli. In addition to seizing numerous trucks and supplies, they captured armoured cars from the 7th Light Cavalry, which had been escorting the convoy. Remarkably, less than three years after fighting side-by-side in the Burma campaign, the two regiments now faced each other as adversaries.

In 1956, Pakistan became a republic and all titles pertaining to British royalty were dropped. The regiment's new designation was 11th Cavalry (Frontier Force). During the Indo-Pakistani War of 1965, 11th Cavalry took part in Pakistan Army's advance towards Akhnur in Kashmir. It then fought in the Battle of Chawinda. In 1971, the regiment again served in the Chhamb Sector of Kashmir. It is the only armoured regiment of Pakistan Army to carry Battle Honours on its Regimental Colours for all three wars fought with India.

- 1921 21st/23rd Cavalry (amalgamation)
- 1922 11th Prince Albert Victor's Own Cavalry (Frontier Force)
- 1927 Prince Albert Victor's Own Cavalry (11th Frontier Force)
- 1956 11th Cavalry (Frontier Force)

=== Badge ===
The badge worn by 11 Cavalry (Frontier Force) since 1974 is an amalgamation of badges of 21st Prince Albert Victor's Own Cavalry (Frontier Force) (Daly's Horse) and 23rd Punjab Cavalry (Frontier Force). It consists of the Kabul to Kandahar Star taken from the badge of 23rd Punjab Cavalry that participated in the Second Afghan War. The swords are taken from the badge of 21st PAVO Cavalry, however, Christian Swords were replaced by Muslim Swords. The Arabic Numerals "١١" replaced the English Numerals "11". Quranic Verse replaced "KABUL TO KANDHAR 1880" around the Numeral "١١". The bugle on top shows association of this regiment with PIFFERS.

=== Battle Honours ===
British India:

- Delhi 1857
- Lucknow 1857
- Afghanistan 1878–80
- Ahmad Khel 1880
- Kandahar 1880,
- Mesopotamia 1915–18
- Kut al Amara 1917
- Baghdad 1917
- Khan Baghdadi 1918
- Sharqat 1918
- Afghanistan 1919
- El Mechili 1941 (Libya)
- Halfaya 1941 (Egypt)
- Gazala 1941 (Egypt)
- Bir Hacheim 1942 (Egypt)
- Kohima 1944 (India)
- Monywa 1945 (Burma)
- Myinmu 1945 (Burma)
- Irrawaddy 1945 (Burma)
- Meiktilla 1945 (Burma)
- Mandalay 1945 (Burma)
- Rangoon 1945 (Burma)
- Malaya 1945
- Java 1946 (Malaya)

Pakistan:

- Kashmir 1948
- Chhamb 1965
- Chawinda 1965
- Chhamb 1971

== Affiliations & Alliances ==
- (Pakistan) 9th Battalion The Frontier Force Regiment
- (United Kingdom) 1st The Queen's Dragoon Guards
