= Aqeel Ahmed (colonel) =

Pakistani army colonel (born 1965)

Colonel (R) Aqeel Ahmed SI(M), psc, MSc, MBA
- عقیل احمد
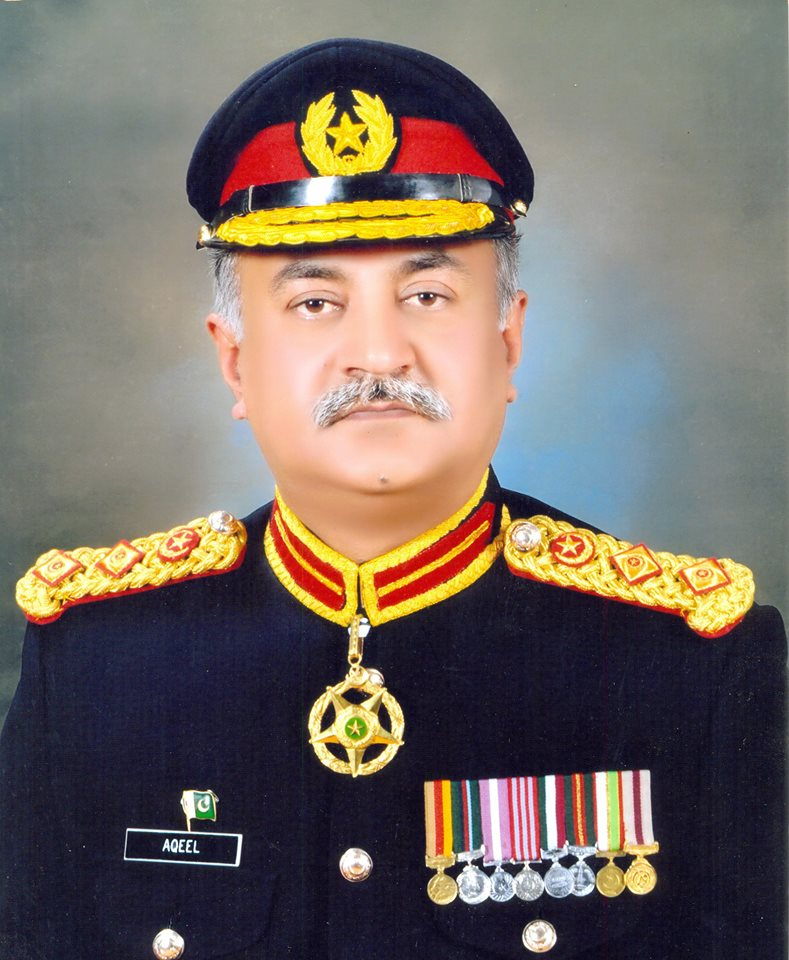

Secretary Heavy Industries Taxila Board
- In office January 2013 – Present

Director Heavy Industries Taxila Education Welfare Trust
- In office January 2013 – Present

Personal details
- Born: Rawalpindi, West Pakistan
- Parent: Major Abdur Razzaq(Father)
- Education: Pakistan Military Academy, College of Electrical and Mechanical Engineering, Pakistan Command and Staff College
- Awards: Sitara-e-Imtiaz (Military), psc

Military service
- Allegiance: Pakistan
- Branch/service: Pakistan Army
- Years of service: 1984-2012
- Rank: Colonel
- Unit: Pakistan Army Corps of Electrical and Mechanical Engineering
- Commands: 544 EME Battalion, Karachi. CEME 12 Div, Murree

Colonel Aqeel Ahmed (Urdu: عقیل احمد) SI(M) born 11 April 1965, is a Pakistani army colonel who currently holds the post of Secretary Heavy Industries Taxila, Ministry of Defence Production and Director Heavy Industries Taxila Education Welfare Trust after his retirement from Army. During his uniform days he Previously served as the General Manager Production (GM-P) Heavy Industries Taxila Taxila from 2007 to 2012. He belongs to the corps of EME and 70th Pakistan Military Academy Long Course. He was promoted to the rank of colonel in September 2007 and got retired from Pakistan Army in December 2012

== Early life and education ==
Aqeel was born on 11 April 1965 in Rawalpindi, West Pakistan into a Punjabi-speaking family that initially migrated from Jalandhar, Punjab, India during the independence. His father, Major Abdur Razzaq, was an officer of Pakistan Army who died in 1998 in Islamabad. His father Major Razzaq served in British Indian Army prior to independence and also fought World War II. Aqeel is the 4th of 5 brothers and a sister. Aqeel's older brother Shakil Ahmed was also a Pakistan Army officer who retired as Lieutenant Colonel from Pakistan Army Regiment of Artillery. His nephew, Captain Fahad Shakil is presently serving in Army Medical Corps.

Aqeel completed his secondary education from Islamabad before joining the Pakistan Army in 1980 as a Junior Cadet which directed him to attend the military academy. He was sent to attend the Pakistan Military Academy in Kakul and passed out with the class of 70th PMA Long Course 1984.

Aqeel is a graduate of the Pakistan Command and Staff College, Quetta, also attended College of EME for his Engineering Degree in Electrical Engineering & Masters in Computer Engineering. Aqeel also holds a degree of Masters in Business Administration (MBA).

== Notable achievements ==
=== Anza Missile ===
Aqeel was posted in Kahuta Research Laboratories (KRL) and was the core part of the team that made Anza (missile) for Pakistan Army. The Anza (عنزہ Anza) is a series of shoulder-fired, man-portable surface-to-air missiles produced by Pakistan. Guided by an infrared homing seeker, the Anza is used for short range air defence.

The Anza (missile) produced by Kahuta Research Laboratories (KRL) is one of the facility's main conventional weapons projects. Development was originally undertaken to eliminate dependence on importing expensive foreign systems. Various versions of the Anza are currently in service with the Pakistan Army, with the Mk-III version being the most recent. The Anza is also offered for export, Malaysia being its only known export customer after receiving 100 Anza Mk-I in 2002 and, later, a further 500 Anza Mk-II systems.

==== Variants of Anza Missile ====
- Anza MK-I
- Anza MK-II
- Anza Mk-III

=== HITEC Institute of Medical Sciences (HITEC-IMS) ===
Aqeel was the core part of the team that established HITEC Institute of Medical Sciences(HITEC-IMS) under the umbrella of Heavy Industries Taxila during his tenure as Secretary Heavy Industries Taxila in 2016.

HITEC-IMS was established back in 2016 by the team from Heavy Industries Taxila under HITEWT. Currently the institute is affiliated with National University of Medical Sciences, commonly referred as NUMS, which is a public university located in Rawalpindi, Punjab, Pakistan. HITEC-IMS id currently offering MBBS & BDS Courses for students.

== Awards ==
Aqeel has been decorated with the Sitara-i-Imtiaz, SI(M) for his military services.

== See also ==
- Pakistan Army
- Heavy Industries Taxila
- HITEC University
- Pakistan Army Corps of Electrical and Mechanical Engineering
