= Sir John Lauder, 3rd Baronet =

Sir John Lauder of Fountainhall, 3rd Baronet was born 3 and baptised 5 December 1669 at Greyfriars Kirk, Edinburgh, Midlothian, Scotland. He died in February 1728 at Fountainhall manor, near Pencaitland, and was interred in the Lauder burial vault within Greyfriars. He succeeded his father John Lauder, Lord Fountainhall in the baronetcy in September 1722.

== Biography ==
Sir John was greatly esteemed and made an Honorary Burgess of the following:

- the burgh of Aberdeen to John Lauder younger of Fountainhall, 28 October 1701;
- the City of Edinburgh, 18 February 1702;
- the burgh of North Berwick to John Lauder younger of Fountainhall, 21 October 1702;
- the burgh of Haddington to John Lauder younger of Fountainhall, 17 April 1703;
- the City of Elgin to John Lauder younger of Fountainhall, 5 October 1714;
- the burgh of Forres to Sir John Lawther [sic] younger of Fountainhall, 26 July 1715.

He married 10 August 1696, at Edinburgh, his cousin Margaret, daughter of Sir Alexander Seton of Pitmedden, 1st Baronet by his wife Margaret, daughter and heiress of William Lauder, Writer (solicitor) and Clerk of Session. They had seven sons and two daughters. He was succeeded by his son and heir, Sir Alexander Lauder, 4th Baronet.

Baronetage of Nova Scotia
Preceded by John Lauder	Baronet (of Fountainhall); 1722–1728	Succeeded by Alexander Lauder
