= 6th Lancers (Watson's Horse) =

Military unit in the British Indian Army and Pakistan Army

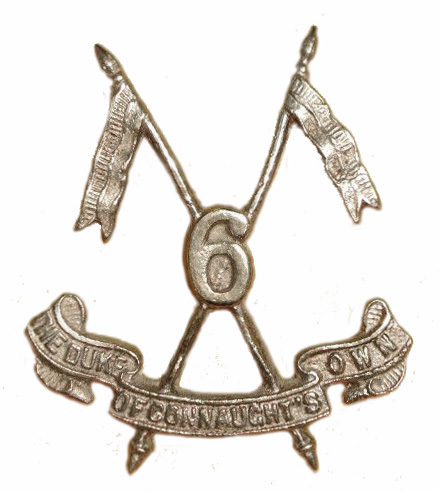
- Active: 1857–present
- Country: British India; Pakistan
- Branch: British Indian Army; Pakistan Army
- Type: Armoured Regiment
- Size: Regiment
- Nicknames: Watson's Horse; Fateh Khem Karan
- Engagements: Indian Mutiny of 1857; Bhutan War 1864–65; Second Afghan War 1878–80; Anglo-Egyptian War 1882; The Boxer Rebellion 1900; First World War 1914–18; Third Afghan War 1919; Second World War 1939–45; Indo-Pakistani War of 1965

Commanders
- Colonel-in-Chief: Prince Arthur, Duke of Connaught and Strathearn (Son of Her Majesty Queen Victoria)
- Senior Most Commandant: Lt. Gen Mian Muhammad Afzaal HI(M) SI(M) OA(M) SBt (Shaheed) (CGS)
- Notable commanders: General Sir John Watson VC GCB; Brigadier Francis Ingall DSO OBE

The 6th Lancers is an armoured regiment of the Pakistan Army. Previously, it was known as the 6th Duke of Connaught's Own Lancers (Watson's Horse), and was a regular cavalry regiment in the British Indian Army. It was formed in 1921 by amalgamation of the 13th Duke of Connaught's Lancers (Watson's Horse) and the 16th Cavalry. The regiment and its predecessors have seen active service on the North West Frontier, in Egypt during 1882, in China during the Boxer Rebellion, the two World Wars and the Indo-Pakistani War of 1965. On the Partition of India in 1947, the regiment was allotted to the Pakistan Army, where it remains in service today.

13th (Duke of Connaught's) Bengal Lancers scouting. Painting by Harry Paine, 1890.

== 13th Duke of Connaught's Lancers (Watson’s Horse) ==
The 13th Duke of Connaught's Lancers was originally raised in Sep 1857, at Lahore, as the 4th Sikh Irregular Cavalry by Lieutenants H Cattley and John Watson VC. Watson was appointed the commandant but did not join until 1860. He would go on to command the regiment for eleven years and is better known for introducing changes in the riding practices of the cavalry, whereby the rider would rise in the stirrups during the trot instead of bumping along in the saddle. The regiment served in the Second Afghan War of 1878–80 and in Egypt in 1882, where it fought against Arabi Pasha at the Battle of Tel-el-Kebir. It so impressed the Duke of Connaught that he requested his mother, Queen Victoria, to appoint him as their Colonel-in-Chief. In 1897, the regiment was engaged in suppressing the tribal uprisings on the Northwest Frontier. During the First World War, the regiment remained on the Northwest Frontier until July 1916, when it moved to Mesopotamia for the relief of Kut-al-Amara. On its return, it served in Waziristan during the Third Afghan War in 1919.

- 1857 4th Sikh Irregular Cavalry
- 1861 13th Regiment of Bengal Cavalry
- 1861 13th Regiment of Bengal Cavalry (Lancers)
- 1874 13th Regiment of Bengal Lancers
- 1884 13th (Duke of Connaught's) Regiment of Bengal Lancers
- 1901 13th (Duke of Connaught's) Bengal Lancers
- 1903 13th Duke of Connaught's Lancers
- 1904 13th Duke of Connaught's Own Lancers (Watson's Horse)

== 16th Cavalry ==
The 16th Cavalry was raised as the Rohilcund Horse at Haldwani in 1857 and spent the next two years pacifying the Rohilkhand. In 1864, the regiment was sent to conquer Bhutan as part of the Bhutan Field Force. It was disbanded in 1882 when three regiments were broken up to provide an additional, fourth squadron for the other regiments. However, fears of a Russian invasion led to the approval for an increase in strength of the cavalry and the 16th Cavalry was reformed in 1885 at Ambala. In 1900, the regiment went to China to relieve the international legations in Peking during the Boxer Rebellion. On relieving the American Legation, the 16th Cavalry was presented with the United States flag, which had flown over the building and, for many years, it had hung in the Officers' Mess. During the First World War, the 16th Cavalry served in the Mesopotamian Campaign. After the war, it served in the Third Afghan War of 1919.

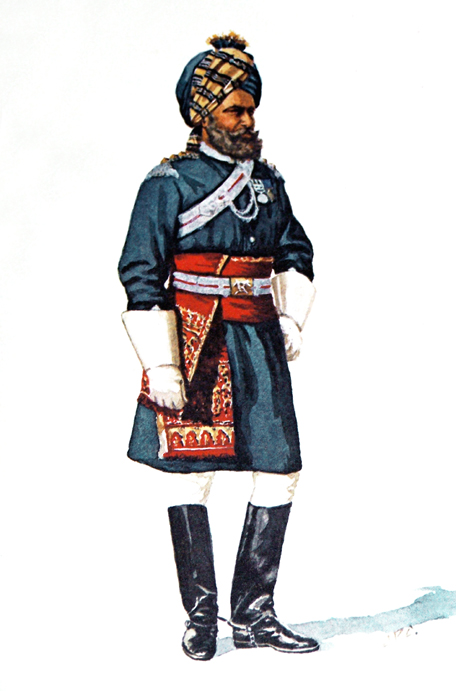
Risaldar-Major of 13th (Duke of Connaught's) Bengal Lancers, 1897. Painting by CP Chater

- 1857 Rohilcund Horse
- 1861 16th Regiment of Bengal Cavalry
- 1864 16th Regiment of Bengal Cavalry (Lancers)
- 1874 16th Regiment of Bengal Lancers
- 1882 Disbanded
- 1885 16th Regiment of Bengal Cavalry (re-raised)
- 1901 16th Bengal Lancers
- 1903 16th Cavalry

== 6th Duke of Connaught’s Own Lancers (Watson’s Horse) ==
After the First World War, the number of Indian cavalry regiments was reduced from thirty-nine to twenty-one. However, instead of disbanding the surplus units, it was decided to amalgamate them in pairs. This resulted in renumbering and renaming of the entire cavalry line. The 13th Duke of Connaught's Lancers (Watson's Horse) and 16th Cavalry were amalgamated at Meerut on 1 June 1921 as the 13th/16th Cavalry; becoming the 6th Duke of Connaught's Own Lancers a year later. Their uniform was blue with scarlet facings, while the new badge was to be crossed lances with the figure '6' on the intersection and a scroll below, reading 'The Duke of Connaught's Own'. Their composition was one squadron each of Punjabi Muslims, Sikhs and Dogras.

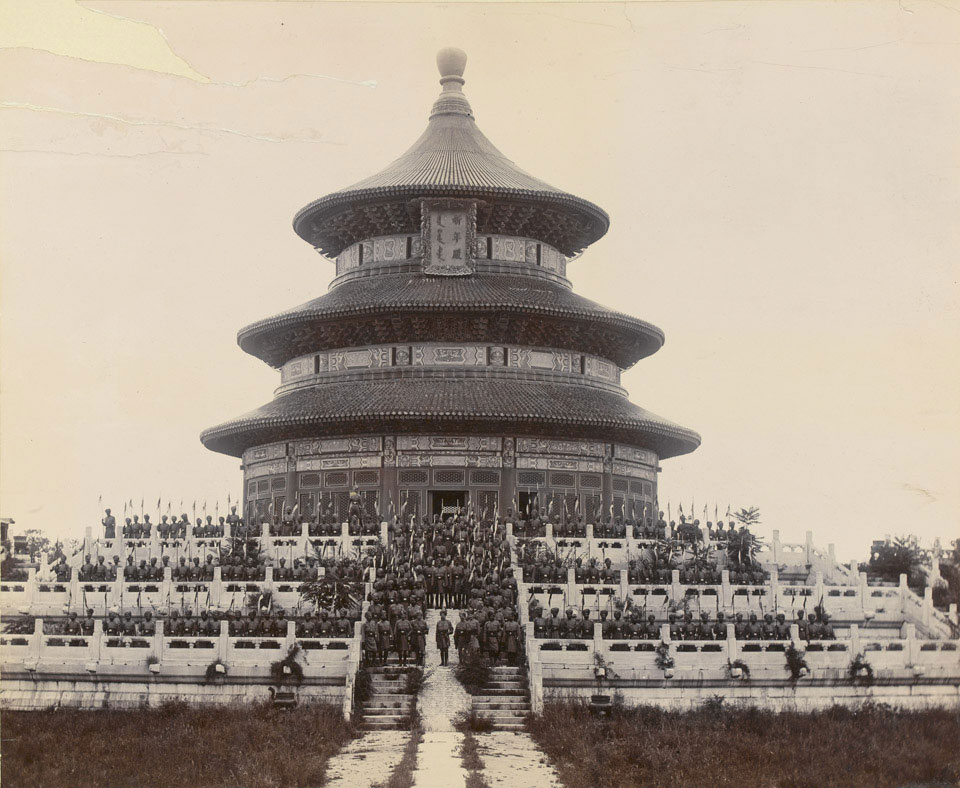
Indian troops, including those of the 16th Bengal Lancers at the Temple of Heaven, Peking; 3rd China War (Boxer Rebellion), 1900

During the Second World War, the 6th Duke of Connaught's Own Lancers, now mounted on armoured cars, served as the Reconnaissance Regiment of the 10th Indian Infantry Division and later with the 8th Indian Infantry Division in the Italian Campaign. The regiment was engaged in a number of actions, most notably the Second Battle of Cassino, Monte Moro, crossing of the Rivers Po and Adige and the race to Venice. In August 1947, on the Partition of India, the 6th DCO Lancers was allotted to Pakistan. The regiment's Jat Squadron went to the 7th Light Cavalry in exchange for their Punjabi Mussalman Squadron, while the Sikh Squadron was exchanged with the Punjabi Mussalmans of the 8th King George V's Own Light Cavalry. 6th Lancers and 11th Cavalry were designated as light armoured regiments and they were equipped with Stuart tanks and Daimler armoured cars, but retained the organisation of a reconnaissance regiment. 6th Lancers moved to Sialkot in 1948, and was then allocated to 10th Division at Lahore.

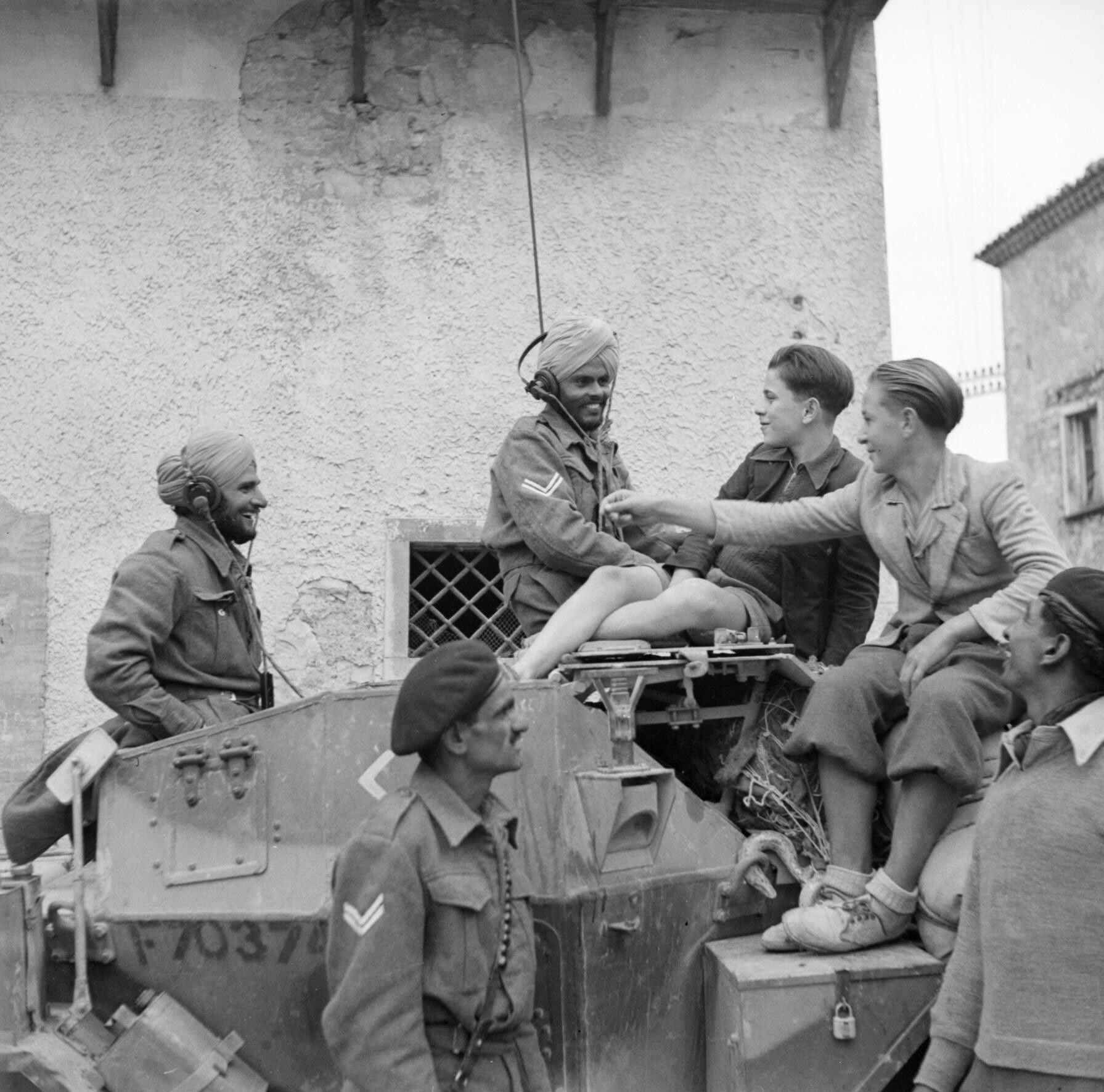
The 6th Duke of Connaught's Own Lancers at San Felice, during the advance towards the River Sangro, Italy, 1943

In 1956, Pakistan became a republic and all titles pertaining to the British royalty were dropped. The regiment's new designation was 6 Lancers. During the Indo-Pakistani War of 1965, 6 Lancers spearheaded the Pakistan Army's advance in the Kasur Sector and captured the Indian town of Khem Karan under the dynamic leadership of their Commandant, Lieutenant Colonel Sahib Zad Gul, who fell in battle while leading his regiment.

- 1921 13th/16th Cavalry (amalgamation)
- 1922 6th Duke of Connaught's Own Lancers
- 1927 6th Duke of Connaught's Own Lancers (Watson's Horse)
- 1956 6 Lancers

== Battle honours ==
Afghanistan 1878–80, Tel-el-Kebir, Egypt 1882, Punjab Frontier, China 1900, Shaiba, Kut al Amara 1915, Ctesiphon, Tigris 1916, Baghdad, Kut al Amara 1917, Sharqat, Mesopotamia 1915–18, NW Frontier, India 1915, Afghanistan 1919, The Trigno, Tuffilo, The Sangro, The Moro, Cassino II, Pignataro, Liri Valley, The Senio, Santerno Crossing, Italy 1943–45, Khem Karan 1965.

== Affiliations and alliances ==
(United Kingdom) Light Dragoons

== See also ==
- 6th Lancers (India)
