= 6th Lancers (India) =

Indian Army regiment

6 Lancers
- Active: 1984 – present
- Country: India
- Allegiance: India
- Branch: Indian Army
- Type: Armour
- Size: Regiment
- Mottos: Dridhta Shaurya Sada Buland (Determination and Valour, always to the fore)
- Colors: Maroon, French Grey and Forest Green.
- Equipment: T-90

Commanders
- Colonel of the Regiment: Lieutenant General Vivek Kashyap

Insignia
- Abbreviation: 6L

The 6th Lancers is an armoured regiment of the Indian Army.

== Formation ==
6 Lancers was raised on 1 February 1984 at Nabha, Punjab as 6 Armoured Regiment. The first Commanding Officer of the Regiment was Lt Col R S Deol, SM. The class composition is 'All India All Caste".

== History ==
Initially, the Regiment was equipped with Vijayanta tanks and was immediately immersed in maintaining law and order in Punjab during Operation Blue Star. The regiment later served in Suratgarh, moving to Samba in 1988 and back to the Punjab in 1992 where it served during Operation Rakshak-II. It served in Operation Rakshak (in Jammu & Kashmir), Operation Vijay and Operation Parakram, during its deployment in Jammu and Kashmir state. The Regiment converted to modern Soviet/Russian T-90 main battle tanks in 2002.

In February 2006, it was re-designated as 6 Lancers, but is not to be confused with the 6th Duke of Connaught's Own Lancers (Watson's Horse), a cavalry regiment of the British Indian Army, which was allotted to Pakistan during the Partition.

The first Colonel of the Regiment was Lt Gen Ajai Singh, PVSM, AVSM (Retd) of the Poona Horse. The Regiment celebrated its Silver Jubilee in 2009. The Regiment was presented the President's Standard along with four other Armoured Regiments of the 1 Armoured Division on 27 November 2011 by the then President of India Mrs Prathiba Patil, while at Patiala. The regiment was awarded GOC-in-C, South Western Command Unit Citation in 2018.

== Regimental Insignia ==
The cap badge of the regiment closely resembles that of its Pakistani counterpart, comprising a pair of crossed lances with pennons and the numeral 6 placed at the junction of the Lances, the whole badge being in white metal. The shoulder title is in brass and initially consisted of the numeral 6, connected to a right-handed armoured fist. After re-designation, the shoulder title now consists of the numeral 6 connected to the capital letter L. The cap badge and shoulder titles are worn by all ranks of the Regiment.

== See also ==
- 6th Lancers (Pakistan)
