= Sir John Dick-Lauder, 8th Baronet =

Sir John Dick Lauder of Fountainhall, 8th Baronet (21 April 1813 – 23 March 1867) was a deputy lieutenant and magistrate for Midlothian, and justice of the peace for Wigtownshire. He succeeded his father, Sir Thomas Dick Lauder, 7th Baronet, in 1848.

Dick-Lauder was born at Relugas, Moray, on 21 April 1813. In his early years Lauder served for two years in the Portuguese Army during that country's Civil War, which ended in 1834. He joined, that year, the Honourable East India Company's Bengal Army as a Cadet and was raised to an Ensign in June the following year in the North India Regiment. He arrived in India on 28 July 1835 and was promoted to lieutenant on 15 December 1838. On 14 February 1839 he was appointed adjutant to the HEIC's Jalaun Corps (which later became the Bundelkhand Legion), and served in disturbances in Bundelkhand (1840-1), Jigni, and Chirgaon, and became Acting Captain-Commandant of cavalry, Bundelkhand Legion, on 24 January 1842. He was in Singapore and China for 10 months in 1843–4, returning to India and the Legion the latter year. He retired from that army on 19 May 1847 returning to civilian life in Scotland.

Dick-Lauder was later a Knight of Justice of the Order of St. John of Jerusalem, and had two seats: Fountainhall Manor, near Pencaitland, Grange House, near Edinburgh, and a residence in Edinburgh at 13 Grosvernor Crescent.

On 22 May 1845, Lauder married Lady Anne (1820–1919), daughter of North Dalrymple, 9th Earl of Stair at St Cuthbert's, Edinburgh. They had three daughters and four sons. He was succeeded by his eldest son and heir, Sir Thomas North Dick-Lauder, 9th Baronet.

Lauder died in Bournemouth, Hampshire on 23 March 1867. His death was reported in the Illustrated London News, 6 April 1867, (p347).

Baronetage of Nova Scotia
Preceded by Thomas Dick Lauder	Baronet (of Fountainhall); 1848–1867	Succeeded by Thomas Dick-Lauder
