= Christ Church, Mussoorie =

Church building in Uttarakhand, India

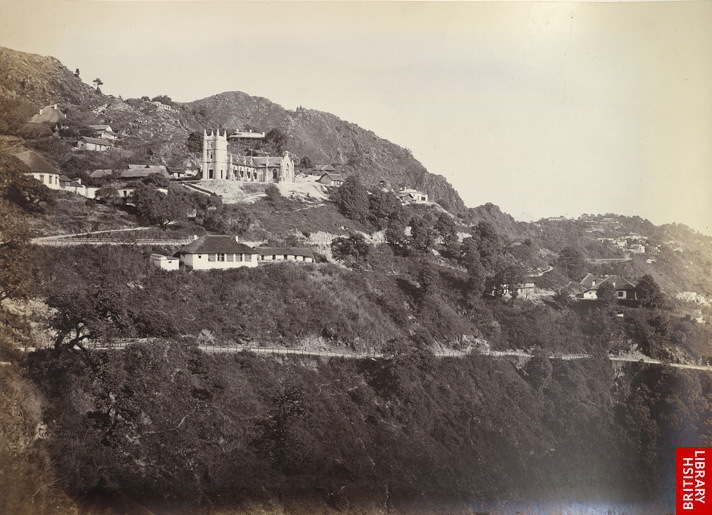
An 1867 image of the Christ Church in Mussoorie

Christ Church, Mussoorie is a church in Mussoorie, Uttarakhand, India, that is considered to be the oldest church in the Himalayan region. It was erected in 1836 by the small British community that had made the town their home. Today, it is part of the Church of North India, a part of the Anglican Communion. It is built in Gothic Revival style.
