= Angus (surname) =

Angus is a surname. Notable people with the surname include:

- Alan Angus (1912–1988), Australian racing cyclist
- Alex Angus (1889–1947), Scottish international rugby union and cricket player
- Barbara Angus (1924–2005), New Zealand diplomat and historian
- Charlie Angus (born 1962), Canadian politician
- Colin Angus (explorer), Canadian author and explorer
- Colin Angus (musician) (born 1961), British musician
- W. David Angus (born 1937), Canadian politician
- Derek Angus (1938–2024), New Zealand politician
- Geoff Angus (born 1948), Australian football player
- George Angus (disambiguation), multiple people
- Graeme Angus (born 1971), English cricketer
- Harry James Angus (born 1982), Australian musician
- Henry Angus (1891–1991), Canadian lawyer
- Ian Angus (disambiguation), multiple people
- Iain Angus (born 1947), Canadian politician
- Jack Angus (disambiguation), multiple people
- James Angus (disambiguation), multiple people
- Jennifer Angus (born 1961), Canadian artist
- John Angus (disambiguation), multiple people
- Kristi Angus (born 1971), Canadian actress
- Marion Angus, Scottish poet
- Michael R. Angus (1930–2010), British businessman
- Nikitta Angus (born 1988), British musician
- Peggy Angus (1904–1993), British artist
- Percy Roy Angus (1893–1961), New Zealand engineer (NZR)
- Richard B. Angus (1831–1922), Canadian railroad financier
- Rita Angus (1908–1970), New Zealand painter
- Ron Angus (born 1956), Canadian judo champion and coach
- Samuel Angus (1881–1943), Australian theologian
- Samuel F. Angus, American baseball executive
- Stevland Angus (born 1980), English football player
- Terry Angus (born 1966), English football player
- Tom Angus (cricketer) (1934–1988), English cricketer
- William Angus (disambiguation), multiple people
- Winfield Angus, American football coach
