= Mordington =

Civil parish in Scottish Borders, Scotland

Coordinates: 55°48′N 2°05′W

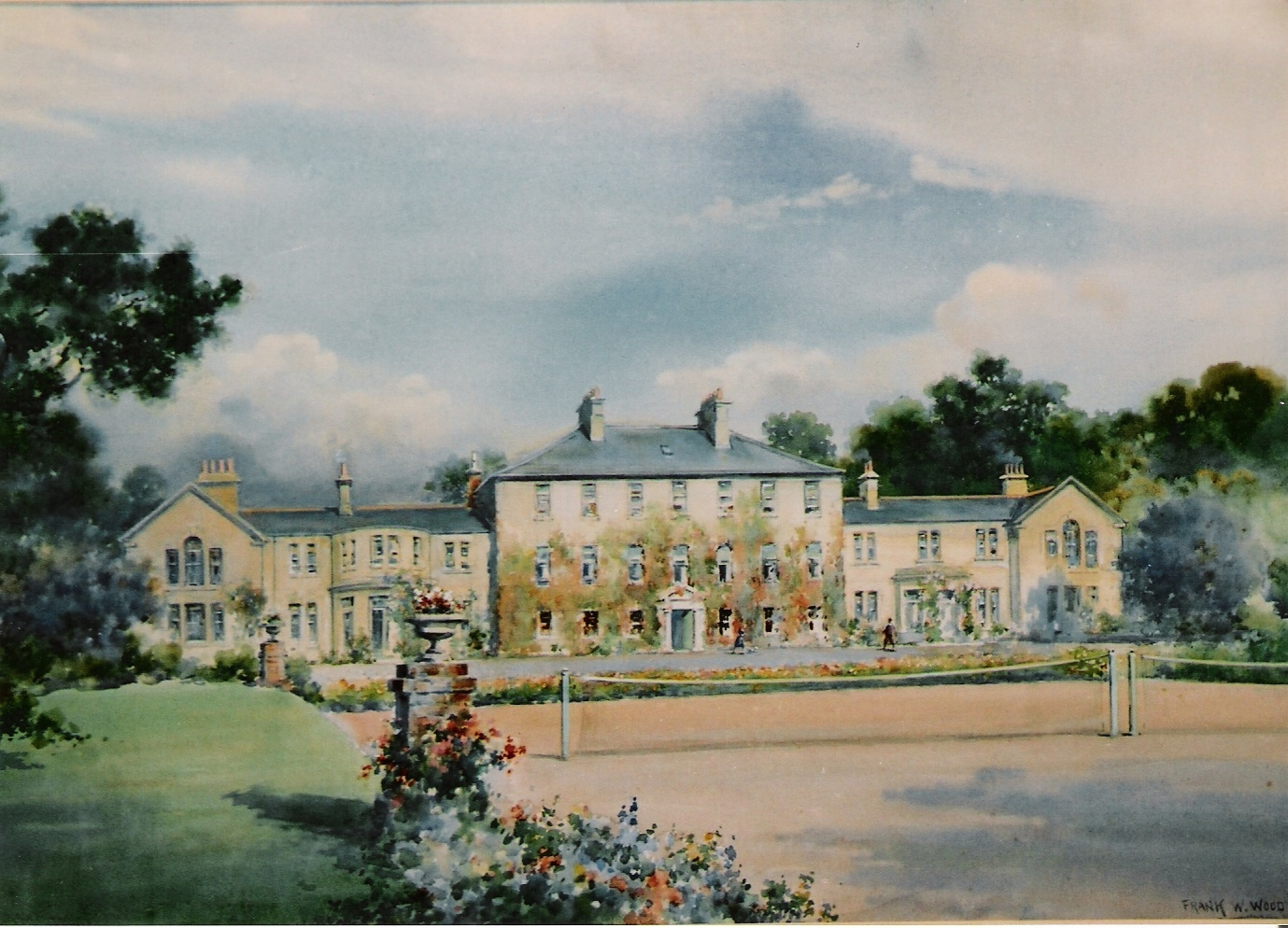
Mordington House (1932)

Mordington is an agricultural parish in the extreme south-east of Berwickshire in the Scottish Borders region. It is five miles from Berwick-upon-Tweed and borders Northumberland to the east, and south (where the boundary is the Whiteadder Water), Foulden to the west, and Lamberton to the north. The parish is bisected by the A6105 Berwick to Duns road. The lower part of the parish is covered by the Edrington estate. It is possibly the warmest parish in Scotland; the annual hours of sunshine are said to be almost as high as at Dunbar, which records the most hours in Scotland.

== Origins ==
It is said that there was once a Saxon village, dating from the 11th century, in the northern part of the parish but this has long vanished. Originally claimed by Coldingham Priory, the larger part of the parish eventually came into the possession of the de Mordington family who appear to have failed in the male line. Sir Peter de Mordington, knight, son of the deceased Sir William de Mordington, gave a feu to Simon Baddeby of certain lands in neighbouring Lamberton circa 1276.

== Churches ==
Mordington was said to have had a chapel before the 11th century. The first parish church of which there is reasonable record stood on high ground known as the Kirk Park, near Mordington House, above the ancient bullock-track which dissected the parish from the Whiteadder to Lamberton Common. Apart from the tarmac, this single-lane road is the same today. In 1275 the vicar at Mordington refused to pay the crusader's tithe, and his successor, Bernard de Linton, swore allegiance to King Edward I on 24 August 1296. It mysteriously burnt down in 1757 and a new church was erected on the Duns road on what became known as the Minister's Glebe. Both of these churches had burial grounds attached to them, and the latter has survived. Little remains of the original churchyard, although in 1662 William Douglas, 2nd Lord Mordington erected a new doorway to an ancient burial vault which is still extant. The parish was long united to Longformacus, but was disjoined in 1666. In 1870 a new church was erected a quarter of a mile uphill from the 2nd church. It was Gothic and cruciform. It too had a churchyard, which is still in use. This church was quickly demolished circa 1989 when the Duns Presbytery refused to pay £3,000 for essential roof repairs.

In 1843 the Free Church of Scotland erected a church on Kirk Hill adjoining Edrington Mains farm and services were maintained there until about 1910. Although still standing, it is now used as a farm building. The two manses in Mordington are today private residences.

After more than 900 years Mordington has no parish church and parishioners must now travel to Foulden.

== Later proprietors ==
With the exception of Edrington estate, the rest of Mordington parish had a succession of landed proprietors over the centuries. The feudal barony of Mordington was long held by the Douglas of Dalkeith family but was split, with Crown consent, early in the 17th century. At that time Over Mordington came into the ownership of Sir James Douglas (died 1656), a son of William Douglas, 10th Earl of Angus. In 1641 Sir James Douglas was made a Lord of Parliament as Lord Mordington. Three years later a Visitation to the parish of Mordingtoun by the Presbytery of Chirnside, called upon James, Lord Mordington, to conform to an Ordinance of the Commissioners of the General Assembly that he, "in the face of God's kirk, should renounce Popery", swear and subscribe the Confession of Faith, and also the Solemn League and Covenant, which his Lordship did at Mordington Kirk, 23 May 1644.

The Ramsay family held Nether Mordington direct from the Crown, and had a tower house there (today Edrington House). Eventually the Lords Mordington acquired this too. However, Charles Douglas, 5th Lord Mordington, took part in the Jacobite rising of 1745, was captured at Carlisle and died in prison in 1745, his estates all forfeited to the Crown. The Over Mordington estate was next purchased by Thomas Hay of Mordington (died 1752), brother of Sir John Hay of Alderston, 1st Baronet. In 1752 it passed to a relative, Alexander Hay of Mordington (died 1788), Advocate. Thereafter it passed to the Renton (later Campbell-Renton) of Lamberton family who retained possession until the 1970s, when, having failed in the male line, the family ended with a female inheritor who preferred to reside in Edinburgh. The House and Estate was then purchased by the Trotter family of Charterhall and Mortonhall in the late 1980s. It is still under their ownership today.

== Mordington House ==
A Pele or tower house existed at Mordington from a very early date, probably from the time of the ownership of Thomas Randolph, 1st Earl of Moray, in the time of Robert the Bruce. His daughter Black Agnes certainly lived there, where she is buried. On 22 July 1650 Oliver Cromwell's forces marched from Berwick-upon-Tweed to the Mordington Tower house and camped there for two days. It appears the Hays may have been responsible for the construction of the magnificent Mordington House, a Georgian mansion centred upon the original Peel tower sections of which were incorporated in its walls. This was the centre block, two storey with basement and vaults, a seven bay front, flanking wings, originally two-storey Palladian pavilions, with single storey links to the main house. In 1932 the artist Frank W Wood painted the house and grounds (see above). Tragically, with great controversy, the house was demolished in 1973. A few years later a new smaller house was built on the site. The original house's lodge survives.

== The Clappers ==
School and headmaster's house, 1891

The only hamlet in the parish is a small group of five tradesmen's houses, once part of the Mordington Estate, known as The Clappers. They include the blacksmith's house and smithy with the blacksmiths being the Jeffrey family who were there 1703-2019. A joiners shop and residence stood nearby but the poor condition of the main row of four houses meant that in 1976 they were demolished to be replaced by three cottages.

Nearby is the Old School House (c1840), and the old schoolroom which was originally built next to it a few decades later, both by the laird, and extended in 1909. Both have been given Listed Building status by Historic Scotland. At one time as many as 50 pupils attended the school but by 1960 the school had closed due to dwindling numbers. Thereafter it was used as a village hall. The schoolroom was sold in 2002 and despite its Listed status was gutted three years later to form a small private residence. The council failed to take action.

== The Holdings ==
Following The Great War a great part of the Mordington estate was compulsorily purchased to provide smallholdings for returning soldiers. Because of their size these could only ever be of a subsistence-farming nature and since 1950 several of the small holdings have been merged with others to provide larger farms.

== Foulden, Mordington and Lamberton Community Council ==
Following the 1973 Local Government Act, Mordington became part of the monolithic Borders Regional Council (today Scottish Borders Council or SBC). In 1976 the combined Foulden Mordington and Lamberton Community Council (the rough equivalent to an English parish council) was established, with eleven elected councillors, which considers all planning and other matters, and advises the SBC accordingly of local decisions.

== Notable people ==
- John Campbell (1814-1856), Member of Parliament for Berwick-upon-Tweed.
- William Angus Knight, Professor of Philosophy at St Andrews University, was born at the manse, 22 February 1836. Knight was a noted editor and biographer of William Wordsworth and was a moving force behind the preservation of Wordsworth's home at Dove Cottage, Grasmere, and Coleridge's cottage at Nether Stowey, Somerset.
- Robert Charles Campbell-Renton (1867-1948) Laird of Mordington & Lamberton, J.P.
- Conor Devaney former midfielder for Aberdeen F.C. under-19s.

== See also ==
- List of places in the Scottish Borders
- List of places in Scotland
