= James Douglas, 1st Lord Mordington =

Arms as recorded in Brown's The Peerage of Scotland, 1834

Sir James Douglas, 1st Lord Mordington (died 11 February 1656) was the second son of William Douglas, 10th Earl of Angus by his spouse Elizabeth, daughter of Laurence Oliphant, 4th Lord Oliphant. He was created, by King Charles I, a Lord of Parliament on 14 November 1641 as Lord Mordington.

== Knighted ==
He had been knighted prior to 1621, and obtained a grant from the Crown of the lands and barony of Over Mordington in Berwickshire on 24 August 1634, although he appears to have already been in possession, as a minute of the Privy Council of Scotland records Sir James Douglas of Mordington, Alexander Lawder, brother of Robert Lawder of Edrington, Alexander Torrie in Mordington, and Patrick Torrie there, are found in dispute with George Roull, Minister at Mordington, when the latter is asking for his sureties (or cautions) to be reduced, dated April 1631.

== Covenant ==
A summons (National Archives of Scotland GD220/3/74) was issued to James, Lord Mordington, and others, charging them to compear before the Estates of Parliament on 4 June following, to answer for not "swearing and subscribing" the Solemn League and Covenant, and to "swear and subscribe it publicly in open face of Parliament", under the pains therein mentioned, dated 20 April 1644. The Presbytery were clearly not satisfied with that summons, and a Visitation (GD220/3/74) to the Kirk of Mordingtoun by the Presbytery of Chirnsyde was made in order to get him to conform to the Ordinance of the Commissioners of the General Assembly of the Church of Scotland "that James Lord Mordingtoun, in the face of God's kirk, should renounce Popery, swear and subscribe the Confession of Faith and also the Solemn League and Covenant, which his Lordship did. Mordington Kirk, May 23, 1644".

== Enforced taxation for English army ==
Lord Mordington held property over the border, and was liable for English taxation there. On 17 October 1644, a letter was sent, addressed to Colonel Lindsay, Governor of Berwick-upon-Tweed, certifying that the Committee and Commissioners for the Parliament of England have assessed the estate of James, Lord Mordington, in the bounds of Berwick to pay £100 Sterling for the forces, and requiring the governor to collect said sum.

== Cromwell ==
He was present at his Tower house of Mordington on 22 July 1650, when Oliver Cromwell's forces arrived and set up camp there for several days, using his home as their headquarters.

== Marriage ==
Lord Mordington married in 1624, Anne, only child and daughter of Laurence Oliphant, 5th Lord Oliphant. This lady claimed the peerage of Oliphant, but in the Court of Session in 1633, it was determined, in the presence of King Charles I, in favour of the heir male. The king, however, decided to create her husband a peer with the title of Lord Mordington, with the precedency of Oliphant (1458). They had:

- William Douglas, 2nd Lord Mordington, his son and heir.
- James
- Anne, married Robert Sempill, 7th Lord Sempill (d.1675), with issue a son & two daughters.

Peerage of Scotland
| New creation | Lord Mordington; 1634–1656 | Succeeded by William Douglas |
