= Tom Angus =

Tom Angus may refer to:

- Tom Angus (cricketer) (1934–1988), English cricketer
- Tom Angus (entomologist) (1915–2005), Canadian entomologist and politician
