= William Angus =

William Angus may refer to:

== Nobility ==
- William Douglas, 2nd Earl of Angus (c. 1398–1437), Scottish nobleman and soldier
- William Douglas, 9th Earl of Angus (1533–1591), Scottish nobleman
- William Douglas, 10th Earl of Angus (1552–1611), Scottish nobleman

== Others ==
- William Angus (VC) (1888–1959), Celtic footballer and Victoria Cross recipient
- William Angus (lawman) (1849–1922), sheriff during the Johnson County War
- William Angus (Fulham footballer) on List of Fulham F.C. players (1–24 appearances)
- William Angus (Australian politician) (1871–1965), South Australian Lower House politician and agriculturist
- William Angus (engraver) (1752–1821), English engraver from Islington, Middlesex
- William Angus (British politician) (1841–1912), president of the National Liberal Federation in the United Kingdom
- William Angus, escaped prisoner from the St. Michael of Scarborough
