= James Douglas, 3rd Lord Mordington =

James Douglas, 3rd Lord Mordington (born 1651), succeeded his father William Douglas, 2nd Lord Mordington,

It is recorded in The Great Seal of Scotland (charter number 294) confirmed at Edinburgh on 2 August 1662, that James Douglas, Master of Mordington, eldest son of William Douglas, 2nd Lord Mordington, acquired the estates of Nether Mordington, as well as Edrington and its castle, which occupied the lower half of the parish. In the National Archives of Scotland (GD206/6/20) are Legal papers relative to the 20 merklands of Over and Nether Mordington in parish of Mordington, regality of Dalkeith and sheriffdom of Berwickshire, dated 1671 – 1710.

In his journals, Sir John Lauder, Lord Fountainhall relates how he went with his father to Iddingtoun in Berwickshire in September 1670, and mentions that the superior of the nearby town of Chirnside was "My Lord Mordington" who was also patron of the Kirk there. He also said that he "saw Paxtoun and Edringtone, a part of [Lauder of] Basses lands, and given away to a brother, now belongs to my Lord Mordington. Saw (Over) Mordington and Nether Mordington (today Edrington House); saw the bounds road with my Lord's park. My Lord Mordington (also) had all of Magdalene field (by the River Tweed), but he could not get it peaceably possessed for thesse of Berwick, so he sold it to Watsone."

An Inventory of the Writs in the National Archives (GD206/6/153) produced for Walter Harper in process of reduction and improbation pursued by Robert Rochead of Masterton are against the creditors of [Lord] Mordington with the Writs (legal papers), dated 1706. It is presumed these referred to either the estate of William Douglas, 2nd Lord Mordington, who appeared to be in debt, or the 3rd Lord, James. (They have not been examined).

James Douglas, 3rd Lord Mordington, married Anne (b.1651) daughter of Alexander Seton, 1st Viscount of Kingston by his first wife, Jean (d. August 1651), daughter of Sir George Fletcher, of the Innerpeffer family. Their son and heir was George Douglas, 4th Lord Mordington.
