= Edrington =

Castle in the UK's Scottish Borders

Edrington Castle
- Edrington Castle Farm, Scottish Borders, Scotland

Site information
- Condition: Ruins

Location
- Coordinates: 55°46′25″N 2°05′47″W

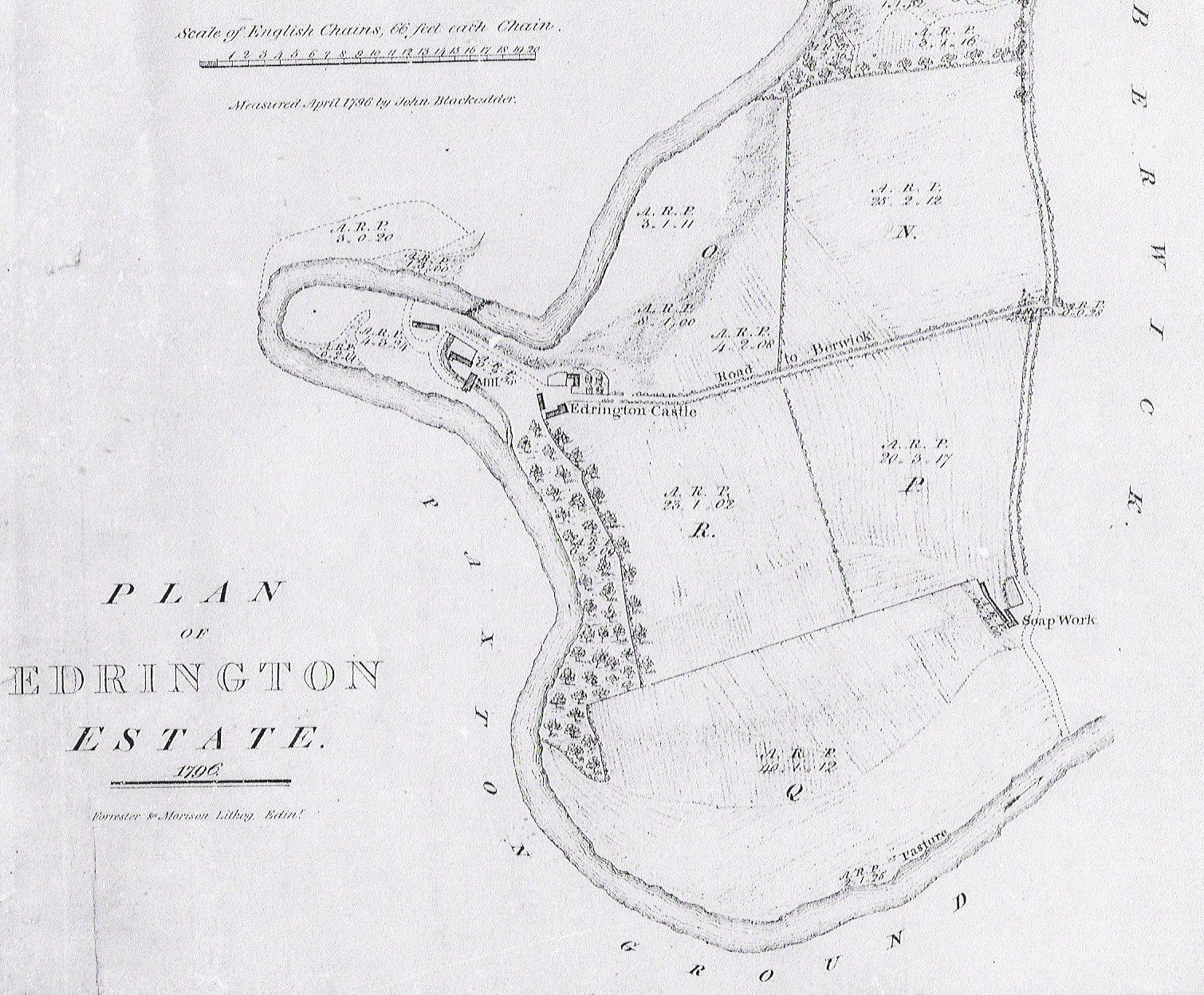
Part of Edrington estate – click on image to see castle & mill

Edrington is a medieval estate occupying the lower part of Mordington parish in Berwickshire, Scotland, five miles (8.0 km) west of Berwick-upon-Tweed. From probably the 14th century, if not earlier, a castle occupied the steep hill above the mill of the same name on the Whiteadder Water. The castle ruin is still marked on today's Ordnance Survey maps, and still appears in locality references in The Berwickshire News. The principal farm of the estate is Edrington Mains.

== Early history and lairds ==
Carr's Coldingham Priory states that Edrington derived its name from its contiguity to the river Whitadder but he does not further explain how he associates the names. Edinburgh lawyer and amateur historian James Logan Mack refers to Edrington as "one of the earliest Border strongholds. The ancient castle occupied the summit of a steep bank above the Whitadder, and must have been a place of considerable strength and importance."

An early reference to Edrington is in Coldingham Parish & Priory which mentions charters (circa 1097) of King Edgar by which were granted the profits of the mansions of, inter alia, Fulden & Hadrington (Foulden & Edrington) "for the souls" of His House (i.e. the Priory). The superiority of the lands of Edrington appear to have originally been claimed by the Palatinate of Durham, although at a very early date they were annexed by the Scottish Crown.

== 14th century ==
Bain carries a reference in the year 1304 to "the King's lands of Edringtone", and also to the King's mill there. However, The Parish of Mordington suggests that the King was Edward I of England. These were 'disputed lands', as we have already seen, with the early charters referring to King Edgar, although Edrington has always been in Scotland.

For centuries the proprietors of Edrington were the Lauders of The Bass. This family had campaigned with both Sir William Wallace, and Robert The Bruce who had appointed Sir Robert de Laweder of the Bass Justiciar of Lothian (or more properly Justiciary of Scotland South of the Forth) before 1316.

On 28 July 1328, Robert the Bruce granted a charter of restitution to Sir Henry Percy of all his father's lands and rents, etc., in Scotland. Witnesses to this charter included Roberto de Lawedre, senior, Knight, (ref: Stones). John J. Reid states: "Sir Robert of Lauder of The Bass was, in 1329, employed on a mission to England, no doubt diplomatic in its character, and payments out of public funds amounting to £60 were made to him for the expense of his journeys to London and York.

In 1330, he possessed hereditarily the fishings of Edrington and was Keeper of Berwick Castle and Sheriff there". "Roberto de Lawedre, Militibus, Justiciario Lowdonie" was a witness in a charter granted by Thomas Randolph, 1st Earl of Moray, to John Stewart, 1st Earl of Angus, of Morthyntoun (Mordington) in 1331. Edrington to this day lies within the parish of Mordington.

Shaw records that "Sir Robert Lauder or Lawedre – both father and son – were present at the battle of Halidon Hill, on July 20, 1333." The famous chronicler Knyghton also states that Sir Robert senior "was present but did not take part due to the fact that he was unable to dismount from his horse in full armour owing to his advanced age".

Halidon Hill is just two miles (3.2 km) from Edrington Castle. J. Stewart Smith (1898) states that "the eldest son of Lauder of The Bass took Edrington during his father's lifetime".

During the English wars the Lauders were frequently forfeited of Edrington and other estates by the English King, but which were always overturned upon Scottish restoration. Until 1376, Edrington Mill had been feued to the de Paxton family in which year it was forfeited due to their part in a rebellion. Thereafter millers were directly employed by the Lauders.

== 15th century ==
"Robertus de Lawedre de Edryngtoune de Scotia, miles" [knight] is mentioned along with "Venerabilis pater Wills epus Glasguen' cancellar' Scotie (William de Lawedre, Bishop of Glasgow and Lord Chancellor of Scotland) and Patricius de Dunbar de Bele de Scotia, mils", under date 12 May 1423 in the Rotuli Scotiae. Again on 19 August 1423, when he was envoy for the ransom of King James I of Scotland; and again on 3 December of that same year. Joseph Bain, quoting from Foedera and other original documents, confirms this.

On 14 December 1425, he was invested in the family estates:- "The King confirms to Robert de Lawedre of Edringtoun, knight, justiciario Scotia, the lands of le Crag, Balgone, the Bass, Edringtoun, Simprin, Easter Pencaitland, Newhall, etc"., for him and his legitimate heirs. According to Alexander Nisbet he too was Justiciar of the Lothians.

Describing him as "Roberto de Lawedre de Edringtoun militi", John J. Reid mentions that this Sir Robert was also an Auditor of Exchequer, and between 1425 and 1433 he was Governor of Edinburgh Castle. His name can be seen today on the Table of Governors on display in the Great Hall at Edinburgh Castle. His son thereafter took Edrington. Rev. Ferrier notes that Sir Robert de Lawedre de Eddringtoun, knight, endowed an altar to St. Mary in North Berwick Church on 4 March 1435. Further, in a charter dated 20 June 1443 re the lands of Hownam, 'Robert of Lawadre of Eddringtoun' appears as a witness

James Logan Mack states that "about the year 1450 Edrington was conveyed by James II of Scotland to Robert Lauder of Bass" but as already noted they were already designated "of Edrington" so this must have been another reconfirmation. A Great Seal charter dated 25 April 1450 mentions a David de Lawder, "a nephew of Robert Lawder of Edringtoune". The same "Robert de Lawedre Lord of Edrington, militibus" appears as a witness to a charter to "Patrick de Dunbar de Bele, militi", signed in "the castle of Bele" (Biel, near Stenton), and confirmed at Edinburgh 24 April 1452.

Around 1462, Berwick-upon-Tweed Castle was put into the hands of Robert Lauder of Edrington. He kept his position uninterruptedly till 1474 when he was succeeded, briefly, by David, Earl of Crawford (later David Lindsay, 1st Duke of Montrose). Scott records that, in 1464, "Robert Lauder was paid £20 for repairs made to Berwick Castle." Robert de Laweder de Edringtoun is the first witness to a Retour of Service dated 1467 of Margaret Sinclair as one of the heirs of her grandfather John Sinclair in the lands of Kimmerghame, Berwickshire.

In a charter of 1471 the King confirmed to Robert Lauder son and heir apparent of Robert Lauder of Edrington, the lands of Edrington and Coalstell with the fishings of 'Edermouth' (Whiteadder Water) plus the mill there (at Edrington) which Robert the father personally resigned to Robert junior and his male heirs failing which those relations bearing the Lauder arms. The spouse of Robert senior, Jonette Home, gave her consent.

In a further charter signed at Edinburgh 26 June 1474 and confirmed there on 27 July 1475, the King confirms a charter of Robert Lauder junior, "Lord of Edringtoun", Witnesses included Robert Lauder of Bass, father of said Robert junior.

On 20 January 1478, the King again appointed Robert Lauder of Edrington as custodian of the castle at Berwick-upon-Tweed for five years with a retainer of 200 merks (Scott gives it as £250) per annum.(The Great Seal). He was not at the castle the following month, as on 2 February 1478, King James III of Scotland advised the bearers of the instalment of Princess Cecilia's dower that he had sent, amongst others, Robert Lawdir of Edrington, son and heir apparent to Robert Lawdir of The Bass, to conduct them to Edinburgh (Bain). Scott notes that he continued as Governor of Berwick Castle till the last year of Scottish occupation, when Patrick Hepburn of Hailes had possession. The printed Exchequer Rolls record that payments were made to "Robert Lauder, Captain and Keeper of the castle at Berwick-upon-Tweed" in 1480 and 1481.

On 12 September 1489, a Charter signed at Linlithgow from King James IV confirmed "to his squire, Robert Lauder of Edrington" various lands. This Robert Lauder of Edrington had married Isobel Hay, daughter of John Hay, 1st Lord Hay of Yester (a descendant of Robert The Bruce), and his wife Mary Lindsay.

== 16th century ==
A charter of 29 March 1509 mentions the next Robert Lauder of Edrington (died 1576) and his father Sir Robert Lauder of The Bass (who had married Isobel Hay), and on 29 April 1519 the new confirmeded to [the new] Robert Lauder of The Bass, was confirmed as superior of the "island of The Bass, with the lands of Edringtoun with tower, and mill".

Around 1540, the Lords of Council issued a summons against Ninian Trotter at the instance of Robert Lauder of the Bass (d. 1576), who claimed that Mr. Trotter had interfered with people using Robert Lauder's mill at Edrington in Berwickshire. Trotter had abducted and imprisoned Mr. Rauf Cook from Berwick, who, with Lauder's consent, "had come to grind his corns at the said Robert's mylne forsaid."

On 15 August 1542, King James V sent an order to the Captain of Dunbar Castle to blow up Edrington Castle "with two half-barrels of powder" because it had been taken and strengthened by the English. The Captain is told to that he consult a William Lauder "the man of most experience within the said castle". However it is clear this order was never carried out.

Robert Lawder of The Bass (d. 1576) loaned two thousand pounds to Mary, Queen of Scots, and Henry Stuart, Lord Darnley. He was with Queen Mary at Carberry Hill on 14 June 1567, and subsequently at the battle of Langside. As a result, on 5 July 1568, Casper Home was granted an escheat of the goods of Robert Lawder of The Bass, including his cattle and other goods at Edringtoun, the said Robert being convicted, become in will, fugitive or at the horn for taking part with Archibald Campbell, 5th Earl of Argyll, Claud Hamilton, and others at Langside or for not finding surety to underlie the law for art and part in the slaughter there of one James Ballany. This escheat was later removed by a precept of remission.

The next laird of Edrington of note was Robert Lauder of the Bass's 4th son, George, then Rector of Auldcathy in Fife. In charter of The Great Seal (no. 688), a reconfirmation at Holyroodhouse on 21 March 1598, of "Eddrington" belonging to Sir George Lauder of The Bass who was a Privy Counsellor and personal friend of King James VI of Scotland and tutor to his son, Henry Frederick, Prince of Wales. Sir George, like several of his predecessors, married late in life Isobel, daughter of Sir Patrick Hepburn of Waughton. This charter also confirms the superiority of Edrington to his only child and heir, George Jr (b. 1597).

George's younger brother, William, was at sometime invested in the hereditary feu of the Edrington estates. In the Muniments of the Scottish National Archives (GD45/16/2757) there is an instrument of sasine dated 19 July 1574 in favour of William Lauder, son of Robert Lauder of The Bass (d. 1576), and Isobel Ramsay, William's future wife in liferent, of the lands and mill of Edrington, Berwickshire.

He was described as William Lauder of Edrington in a precept of clare constat containing a precept of sasine dated 7 September 1587 granted by his brother George Lauder of Bass, but was dead by 1622.

== 17th century ==
In a Duns Sheriff Court Deed (SC60/56/1) dated 6 November 1622 two of William's sons are mentioned: "Alexander Lauder brother to Robert Lauder of Edrington". A sasine registered on 10 March 1634 (RS25/22 fol.82) mentions "the late William Lauder of Edringtoune" and his "eldest lawful son and apparent heir, Robert". Robert's brother Alexander is also again mentioned here, and the Edinburgh Apprentice's Register records that they had another brother, "William, son to William Lauder of Edrington" who was indentured in 1609. Robert was still alive in 1642, in receipt of the annualrents of Poppill in Haddingtonshire, In this Sasine, Robert was resigning them to Sir Patrick Hepburn of Waughton.

Sir John Lauder, Lord Fountainhall states that during a journey he made with his father to the Borders in 1670 he "saw Paxton, and Edringtone a part of [Lauder of] Basses lands, and given away to a brother; now belongs to my Lord Mordington".

By the end of 1641 the superiority of Edrington had passed to Sir Patrick Hepburn of Waughton, the last George Lauder of The Bass's uncle. His son John Hepburn, a Royalist and Episcopalian, held the castle of The Bass against Oliver Cromwell, and was heavily fined and imprisoned. John Hepburn of Waughton was forced to resign Edrington in charter 1948 dated 1 March 1648 to James Scott, a merchant-burgess of Edinburgh. Scott was dead by June 1653 when his widow, Jeanette Archibald, was described as his relict in a charter of that date. It then passed to another of his family, probably his son, Patrick Scott, who also became a merchant-burgess of Edinburgh, and who was designated "of Edringtoune" in a charter dated 22 February 1653, when he was confirmed in the lands of Langshaw in the barony of Melrose.

== Lord Mordington ==
Patrick Scott and James Winraham, who held wadsets (mortgages) over Edrington, resigned "the lands of Edrington", with fishings etc., and "the manor-place" [castle], on 16 June 1661 by sale, recorded in the Great Seal of Scotland, to James, Master of Mordington, "eldest lawful son of William Douglas, 2nd Lord Mordington, and his heirs male, whom failing to William Douglas his next younger brother and his heirs male, whom failing to Francis Douglas his second brother" etc.

The Lauder connexion continued as Lords Mordington intermarried with the Douglas of Whittingehame family who had intermarried with the Lauders of The Bass about 1537. George Douglas, 4th Lord Mordington was married to Catherine Lauder (both died 1741). Their son, Charles Douglas, 5th Lord Mordington, was a Jacobite and was forfeited following the 1745 uprising. He died s.p. Uncles did not attempt to reclaim the title and it fell dormant. In 1799 the proprietor of the estate was a Joseph Marshall, Esq.

== Today ==
Thereafter the estate changed hands at least twice in every century. In 1945 it came into the possession of the Robertson sisters, who established in May 1961 the Robertson Trust. Elspeth, Agnes, and Ethel Robertson had inherited, from their father James Robertson, the controlling interest in Robertson & Baxter and the Clyde Bonding Company, which was renamed The Edrington Group, wholly owned by the Trust.

The estate was bought by Michael Edmund Thornhill, a former Hong Kong solicitor, in 1991.

== Edrington Castle ==
The castle ruins have been incorporated into some of the farm buildings.

Tytler states that during the crisis of 1481 the Border barons and those whose estates lay near the sea were commanded to put into a posture of defence their various castles, one of which was Edrington. In July 1482, Edrington Castle was taken and burnt by Richard (the future King Richard III), Duke of Gloucester's army but was soon afterwards rebuilt and fortified by order (and presumably paid for) of the Scottish Parliament.

Pitcairn records on 7 April 1529, a "remission to Robert Lauder of The Bass and eleven others for treasonably intercommuning, resetting and assisting Archibald Douglas, 6th Earl of Angus (who had been forfeited), George Douglas, his brother, and Archibald, their uncle" whom Lauder had given refuge to in his castle of Edrington. The Douglases went into exile across the border.

About 1546 Edrington Castle was again captured by the English and in that year the Scots demanded that "their house of Edrington" should be immediately restored to them; and in accordance with a Treaty concluded in the church at Norham, Edward VI vacated it.

Edrington Castle as a residence, it would appear, was eventually superseded by the Pele Tower at Nether Mordington, today Edrington House, probably when it was rebuilt about 1750. [See: Timothy Pont's map of Mercia in Blaeu's Atlas].

The Parish of Mordington says of Edrington castle that "at the close of the eighteenth century the tower and battlements were substantially intact"; and H. Drummond Gauld (Brave Borderland, London 1934) states "towards the close of the 18th century Edrington Castle was still four storeys in height, a commanding ruin perched on the pinnacle of a crag clothed with trees. On the western side the castle was inaccessible and was well adapted to stem the torrent on incursion from the English shores of the Tweed." James Logan Mack too said that "after the Union [1707] it was suffered to fall into decay." The Old Statistical Account of Scotland (vol. 15, c. 1795) mentions "Edrington Castle, ruins, demands our notice."

One hundred years on, the Ordnance Gazetteer (Edinburgh 1885) was still referring to Edrington castle as "a ruined fortalice". But The Castellated & Domestic Architecture of Scotland from the 12th to the 18th Century, (vol. IV, Edinburgh, 1892) says that it was by then "a mere fragment of an ancient castle; a place of some importance in the Border wars."

By 1892, the year of publication of the abovementioned architectural survey, Mr. Edward Gray, the new owner, had completed a new country house nearby called Cawderstanes, with some cottages also adjoining the castle incorporating parts of it. Almost certainly his builders have been responsible for quarrying the stone from the castle for the big house.

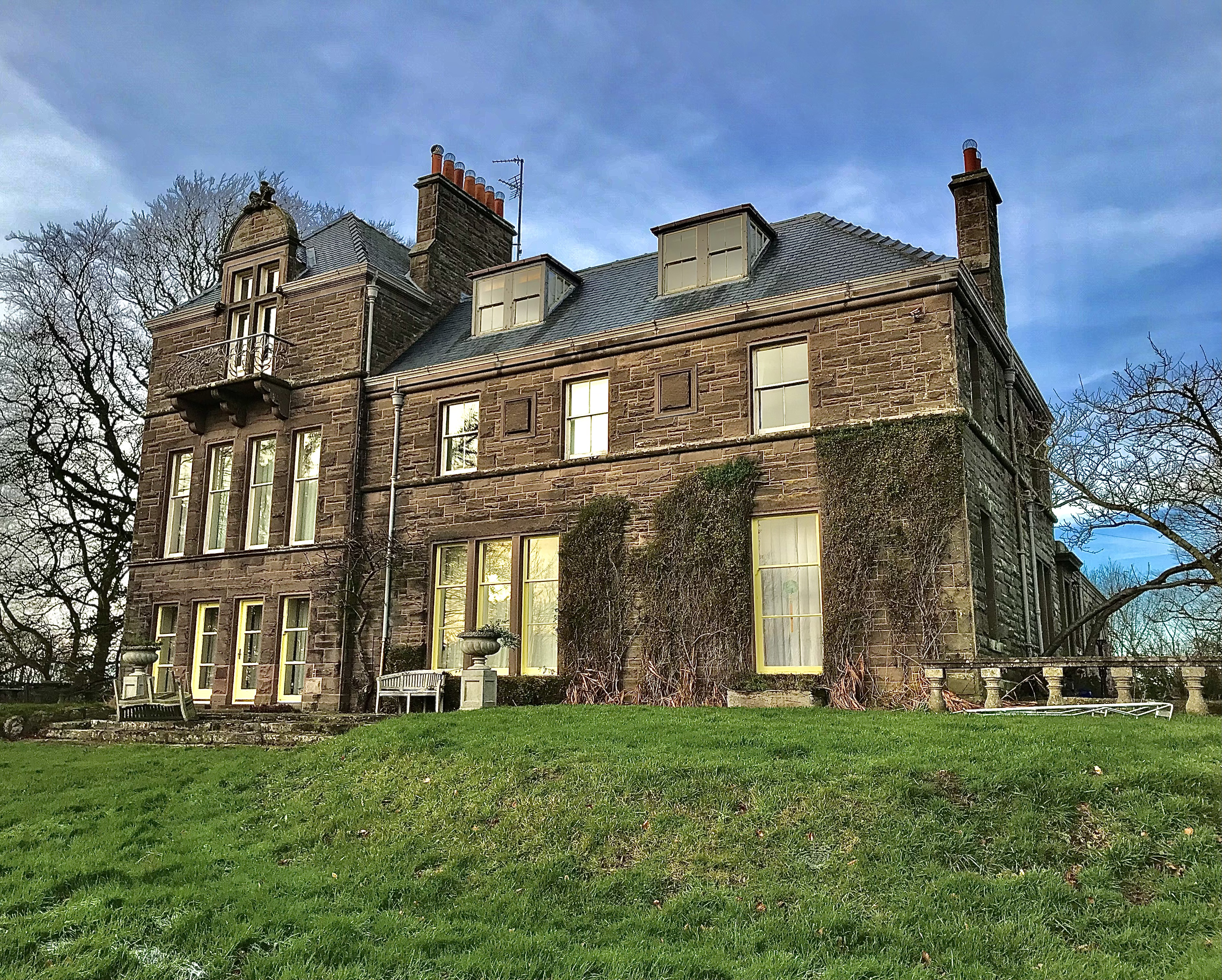
Cawderstanes in closeup, viewed from the south

By 1909, Sir Herbert Maxwell, Bt., notes: "Edrington Castle, opposite Paxton, once a place of great strength and importance, has been quarried away to near ground level." The Sixth Report & Inventory of Monuments & Constructions in the County of Berwick (HMSO, Edinburgh, 1915) states "this castle is situated about three and a half miles west of Berwick, on a rocky bank above the Whitadder. A mere fragment remains, adjoining and incorporated in the farm buildings." Mr. Drummond Gauld (1934) laments that the castle "has suffered more from the attentions of local vandals than it ever did from the English."

== Edrington Mill ==
Edrington Mill, however, continued in its full operations into the 20th century. In 1789 a major rebuild of the mill commenced and a stone to this effect can still be seen. From about 1890 on the mill was tenanted out, the last miller facing the massive floods which swept the district on 12 August 1948 (a stone on the wall today shows the high-water mark). All work ceased and the mill has been closed up ever since, having operated since at least 1300. Calls have recently been made by the Berwickshire Civic Society for its restoration.

Edrington remains an entirely rural estate on the English border, accessed from both the English and Scottish road networks, and largely unchanged over the centuries. Today a footbridge and footpath connects Edrington to nearby Paxton.

== Gallery ==
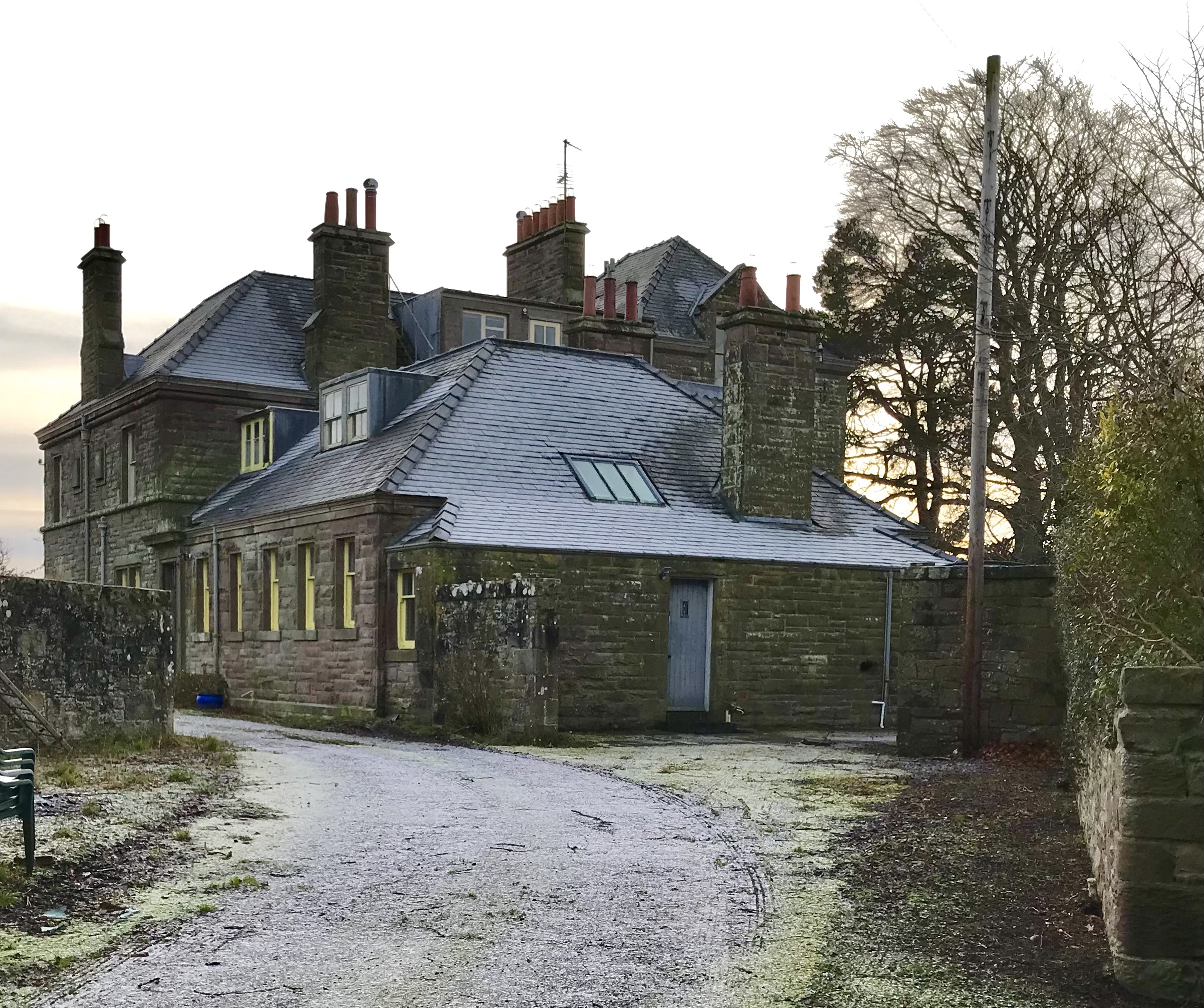
Cawderstanes, north side

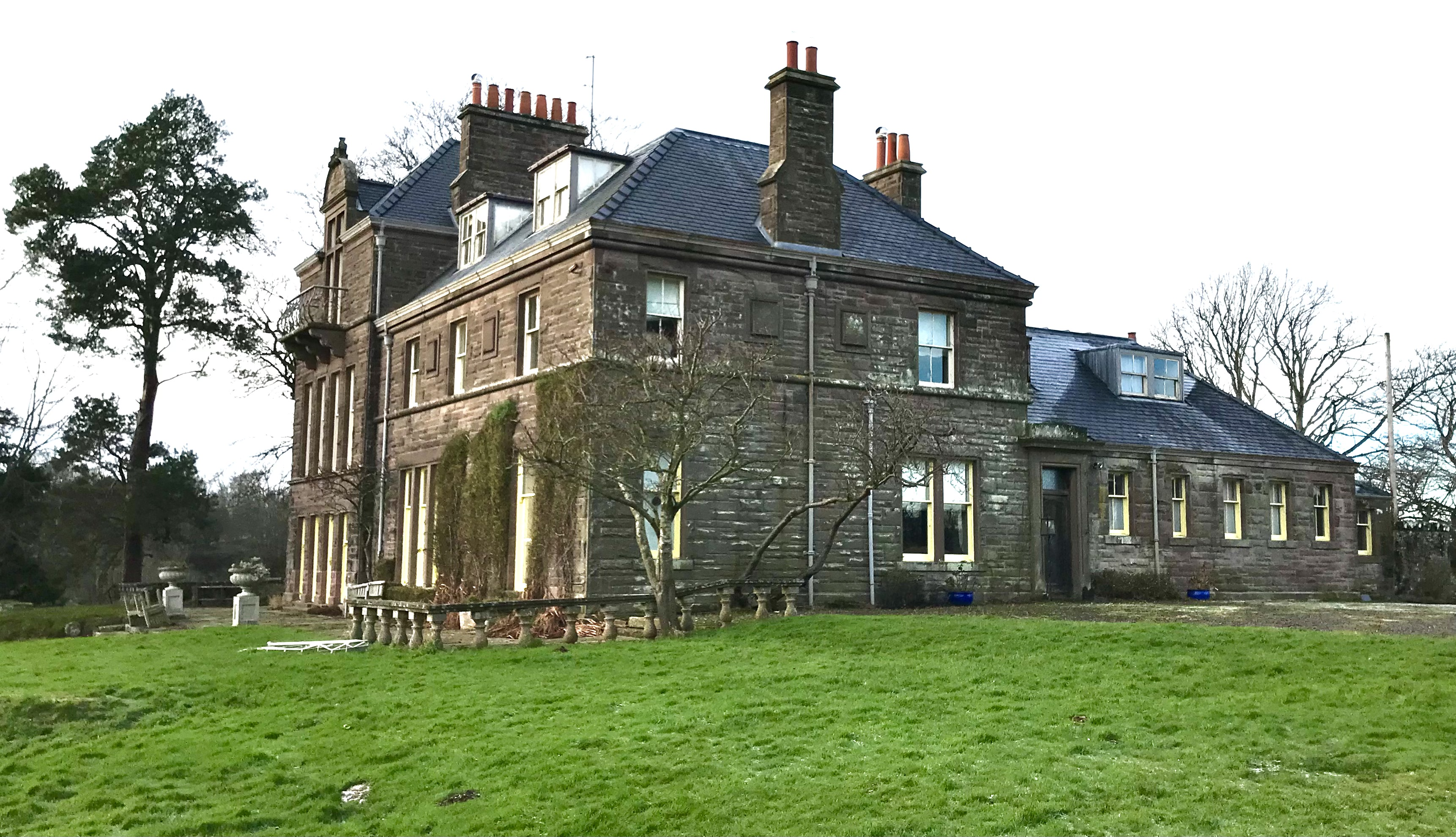
Cawderstanes, east and south sides

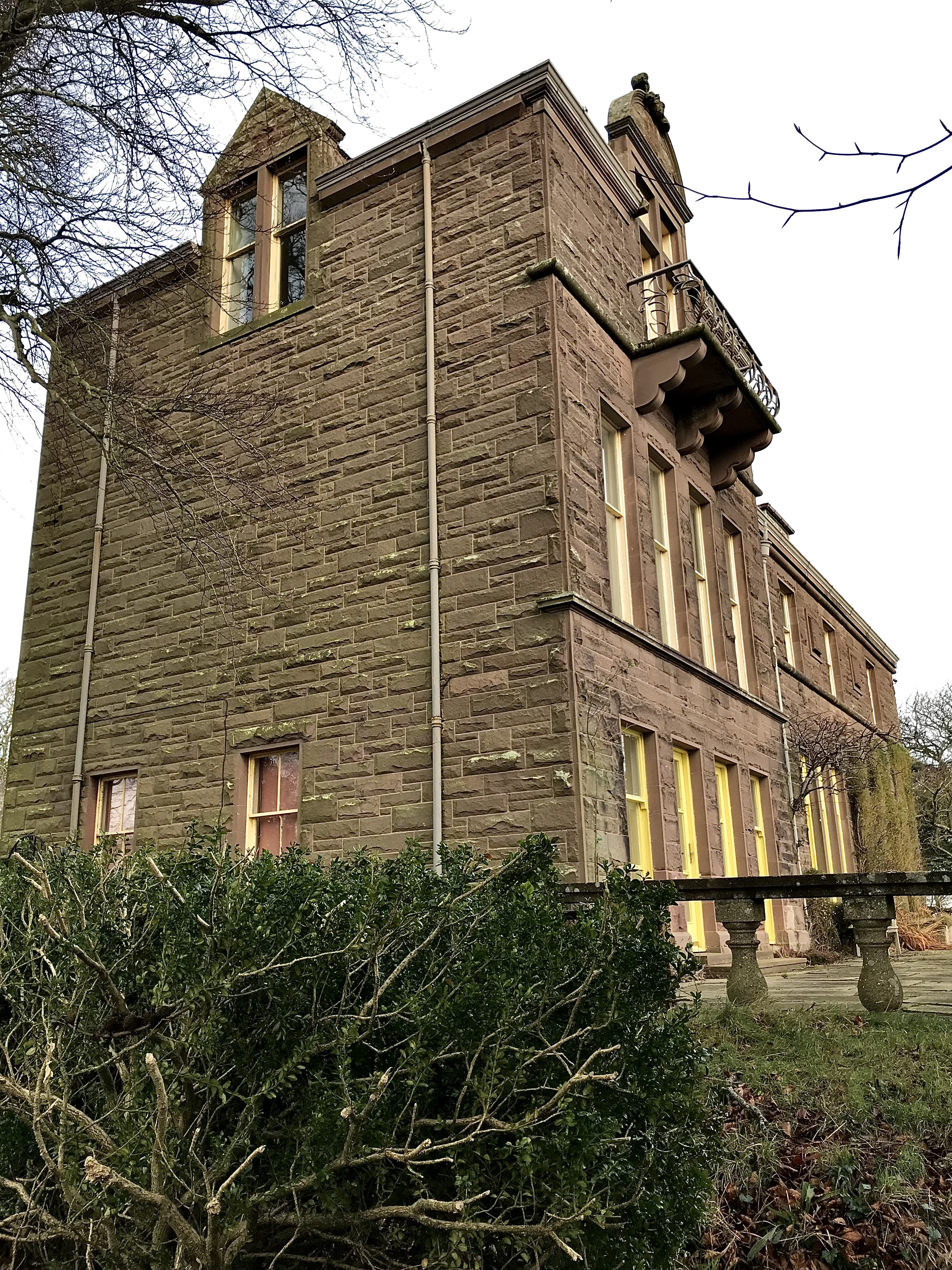
Cawderstanes: the (largely windowless) west side of the house

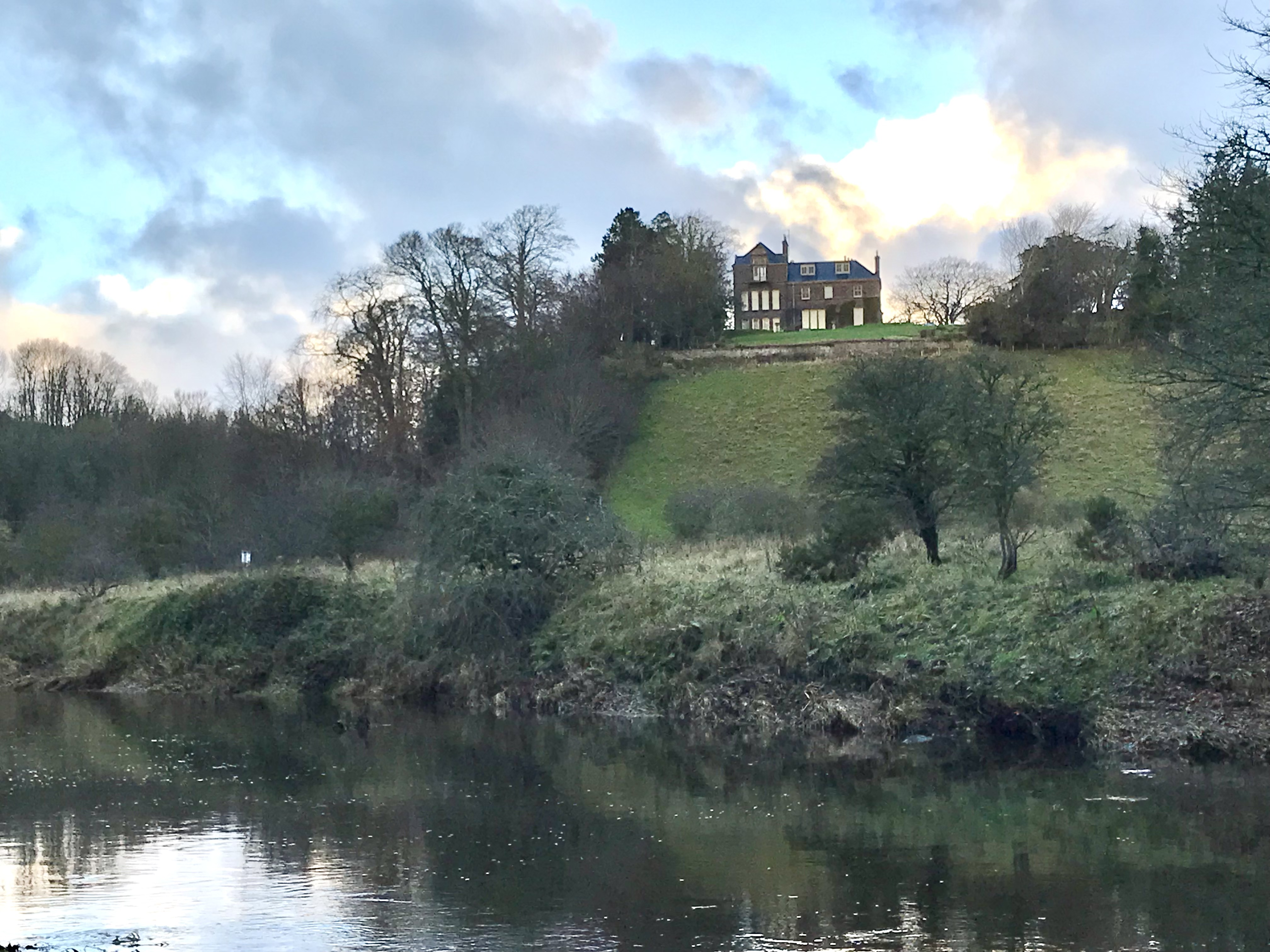
Cawderstanes, viewed from West bank of Whiteadder near its confluence with the Wall Mire stream

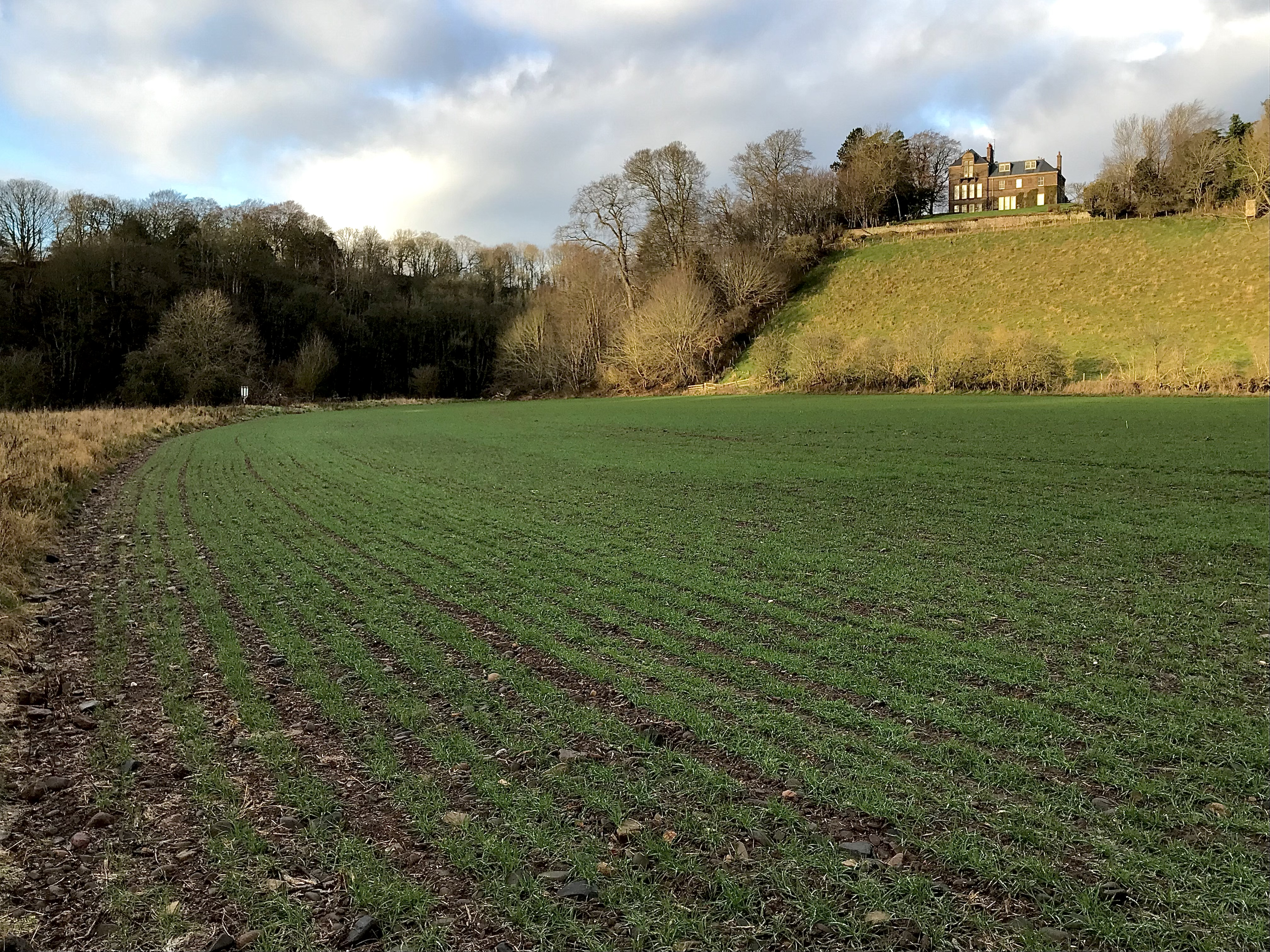
Cawderstanes, viewed from the field at the foot of the bluff upon which it stands

== See also ==
- List of places in the Scottish Borders
- List of places in Scotland

== Other references ==
- Systems of Heraldry, by Alexander Nisbet, Edinburgh, 1722.
- The History of Scotland, by Patrick Fraser Tytler, Edinburgh, 1866, vols: IV (p. 226) and V (p. 204).
- The Register of The Privy Council of Scotland, vol. III, Edinburgh, 1880, p118-119.
- History of the Province of Moray, by Lachlan Shaw, 3 vols, Glasgow, 1882.
- Early Notices of the Bass Rock and its Owners, by John J Reid, B.A., in The Proceedings of the Society of Antiquaries of Scotland, Edinburgh, December 1885.
- The Exchequer Rolls of Scotland, 1480–1487, edited by George Burnett, LL.D., Lord Lyon King of Arms, Edinburgh, 1886, vol. IX, pp. 63–64. 81, 145 & 157.
- The Exchequer Rolls of Scotland, 1513–1522, edited by A.E.J.G.Mackay, M.A., LL.D. Edinburgh, 1893, vol. XIV, pps: 619–620.
- Calendar of Documents Relating to Scotland, by Joseph Bain, Edinburgh 1888, vol. 4, number 1445, p. 294.
- Berwick-upon-Tweed, The History of the Town and Guild, by John Scott, London, 1888.
- The Grange of St.Giles, by J Stewart-Smith, Edinburgh, 1898.
- Journals of Sir John Lauder, Lord Fountainhall, 1665–1676, edited by Donald Crawford, Edinburgh, 1900, p. 202.
- Coldingham Parish & Priory, by A. Thomson, Galashiels, 1908.
- The Border Line, by James Logan Mack, Edinburgh, 1924.
- Register of the Privy Seal of Scotland 1567–1574, edited by Gordon Donaldson, D.Litt., vol. vi, Edinburgh, 1963, number 355, p. 76.
- Anglo-Scottish Relations, 1174–1328, edited & translated by Professor E.L.G. Stones, Oxford, 1965, p345, no.172.
- The Parish of Mordington, by W. R. Johnson, Berwick-upon-Tweed, 1966.
- The North Berwick Story, by Reverend Walter M Ferrier, North Berwick, 1980.
- The Borders Family History Society Magazine, issue number 41, October 1999. ISSN 0268-5701
- Edrington Mill in the Berwickshire Civic Society Newsletter, no.27, Autumn 2006.
- Carr, A. A. (1836). A history of Coldingham Priory. Edinburgh.
- Coventry, Martin (2008). Castles of the Clans: the strongholds and seats of 750 Scottish families and clans. Musselburgh.
