= John Angus =

John or Jack Angus may refer to:

- John Angus (minister) (1724–1801), English independent minister
- John Angus (politician) (1943–2026), Canadian politician in Manitoba
- John Angus (children's advocate) (1948–2015) New Zealand historian, social worker and children's advocate
- John Angus (footballer, born 1868) (1867–1891), Scottish football goalkeeper who played for Everton
- John Angus (footballer, born 1938) (1938–2021), Burnley and England footballer
- Jack Angus (footballer, born 1868) (1868–1933), Scottish footballer, who played for Ardwick, Southampton and Fulham
- Jack Angus (footballer, born 1909) (1909–1965), English footballer, who played for Exeter City from 1930 to 1948
