= Frank W. Wood =

English painter (1862–1953)

Frank Watson Wood
- Born: 19 September 1862; Berwick upon Tweed, England
- Died: 23 March 1953 (aged 90); Strathyre, Scotland

Francis Watson Wood (19 September 1862 – 23 March 1953) was an internationally regarded watercolourist.

== Early life ==
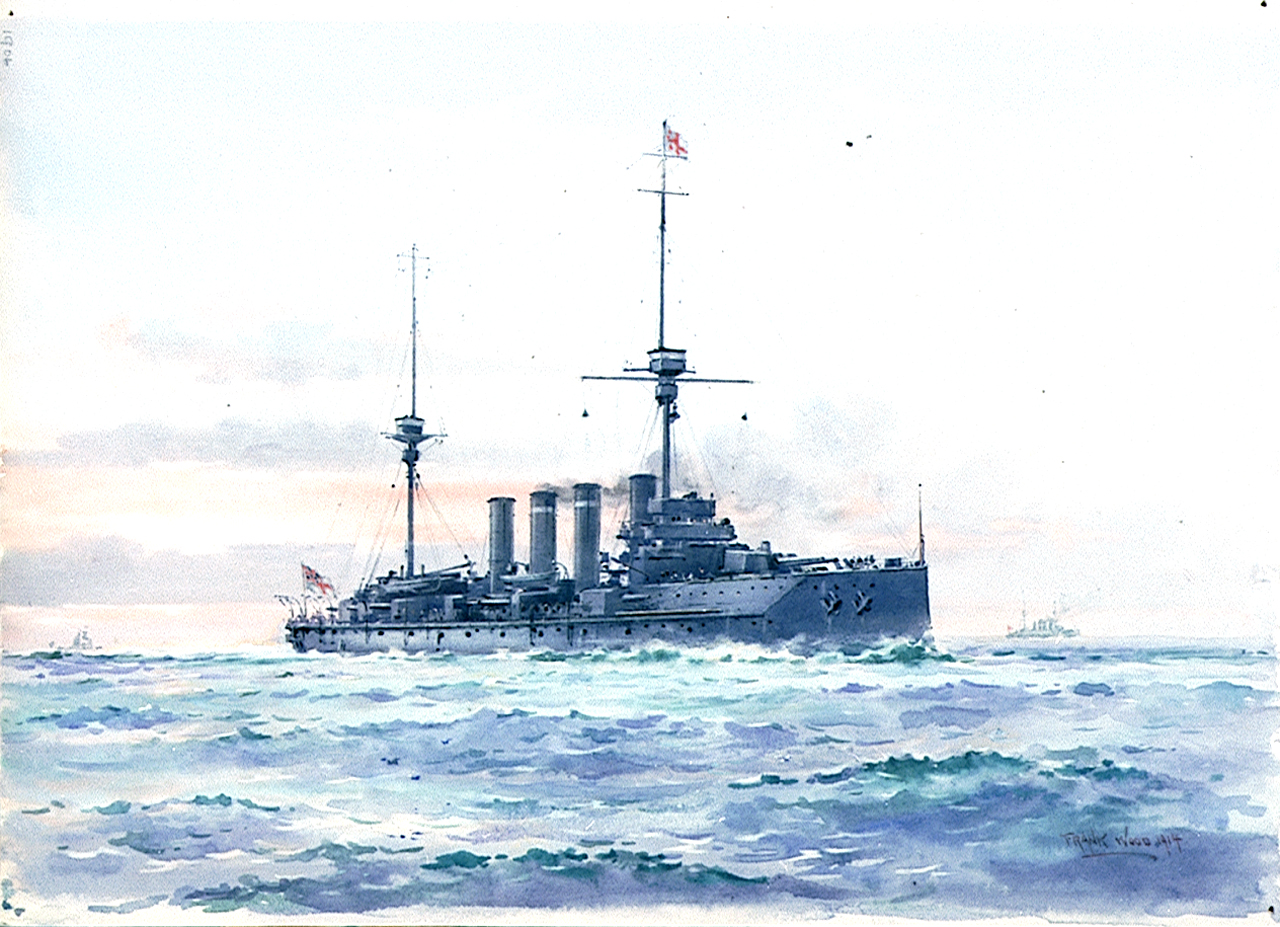
HMS Shannon (1914)

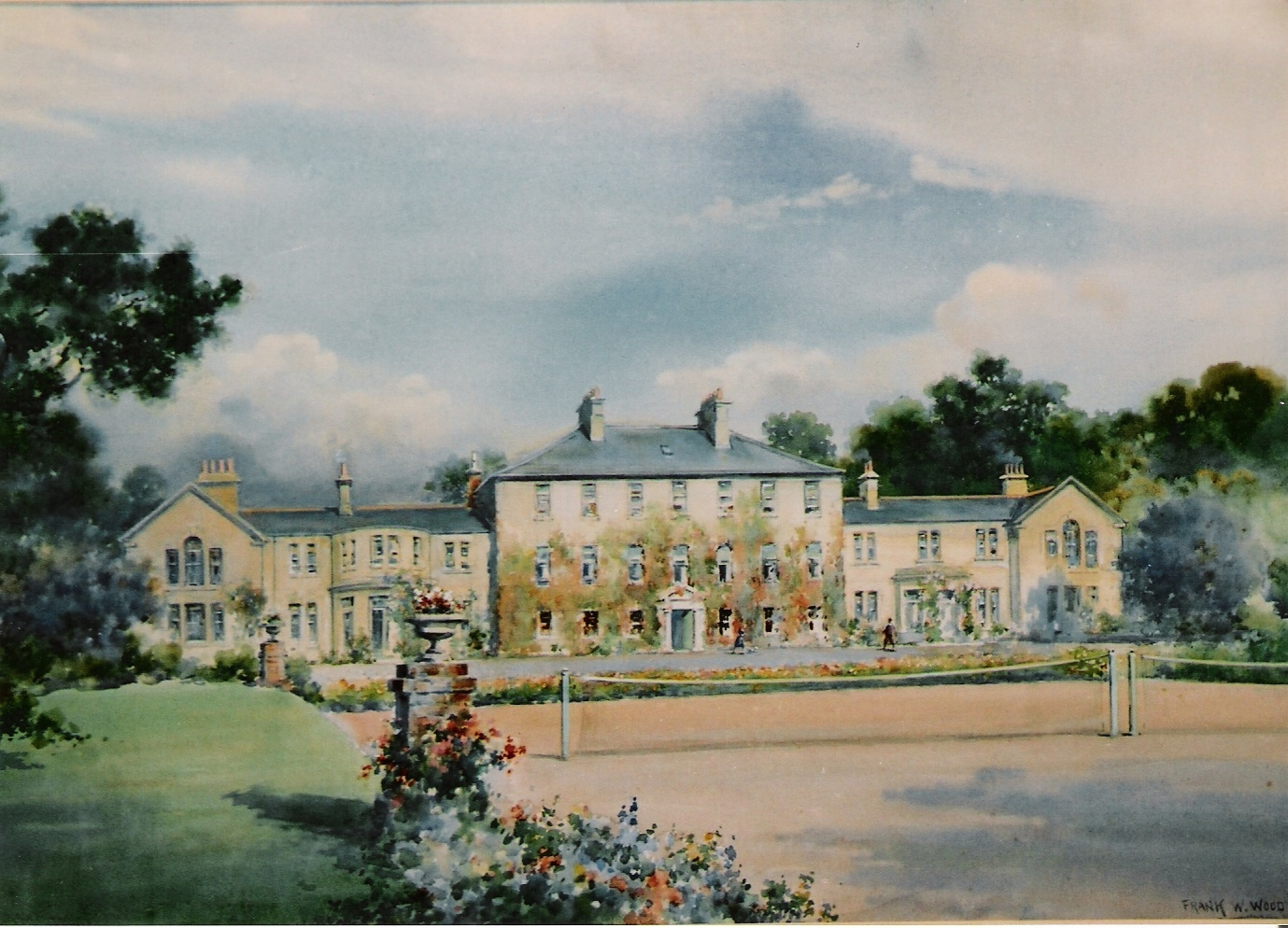
Wood's watercolour of Mordington House (1932)

The son of Robert and Ann, who resided in the High Street of Berwick-upon-Tweed, Frank Wood was initially apprenticed to a Grocer but, having convinced his parents of his talent, soon moved to study at the Berwick School of Art. Soon after he moved to Kensington to study at the South Kensington Art School (later The Royal College of Art) and in 1886, moved to the Newcastle School of Art where he served as Second Master. After a period as Headmaster of the White School of Art, he decided to become a professional artist in 1899 and moved to Portsmouth in 1906 to focus on painting ships. Moving amongst the officers of the fleet, in August 1903 he sold King Edward VII a watercolour which he hung in the Royal Yacht. Queen Alexandra purchased at the same time a further three pictures, all associated with views taken during Cowes Regatta week. In November 1907 the Queen again purchased from him two large watercolours. These two sales set his artistic career in motion and he developed into one of the most prolific and talented marine artists of the 20th century.

== Painting ==
=== Landscapes and building ===
In addition to his main passion of warships, Wood was also a keen painter of landscapes and buildings in and around Berwick Upon Tweed. During his life he often returned to paint scenes and places familiar to his youth and his paintings were always meticulously detailed.

=== Marine Painting at Portsmouth ===
Much of Woods early work came from serving or retiring officers who commissioned paintings of their ships - or ships that they had served in. These paintings form the bulk of Woods work and provide valuable images of some of the more obscure ships of that period.

Alongside William Wyllie, Wood was invited to join the Grand Fleet Flagship HMS Queen Elizabeth and tour the surrendered German High Seas fleet at Scapa Flow in 1918.

Wood was in Bermuda in 1929 and 1931, and painted Admiralty House (since demolished) and Admiralty Cove, in those days the Headquarters of the America & West Indies Squadron.

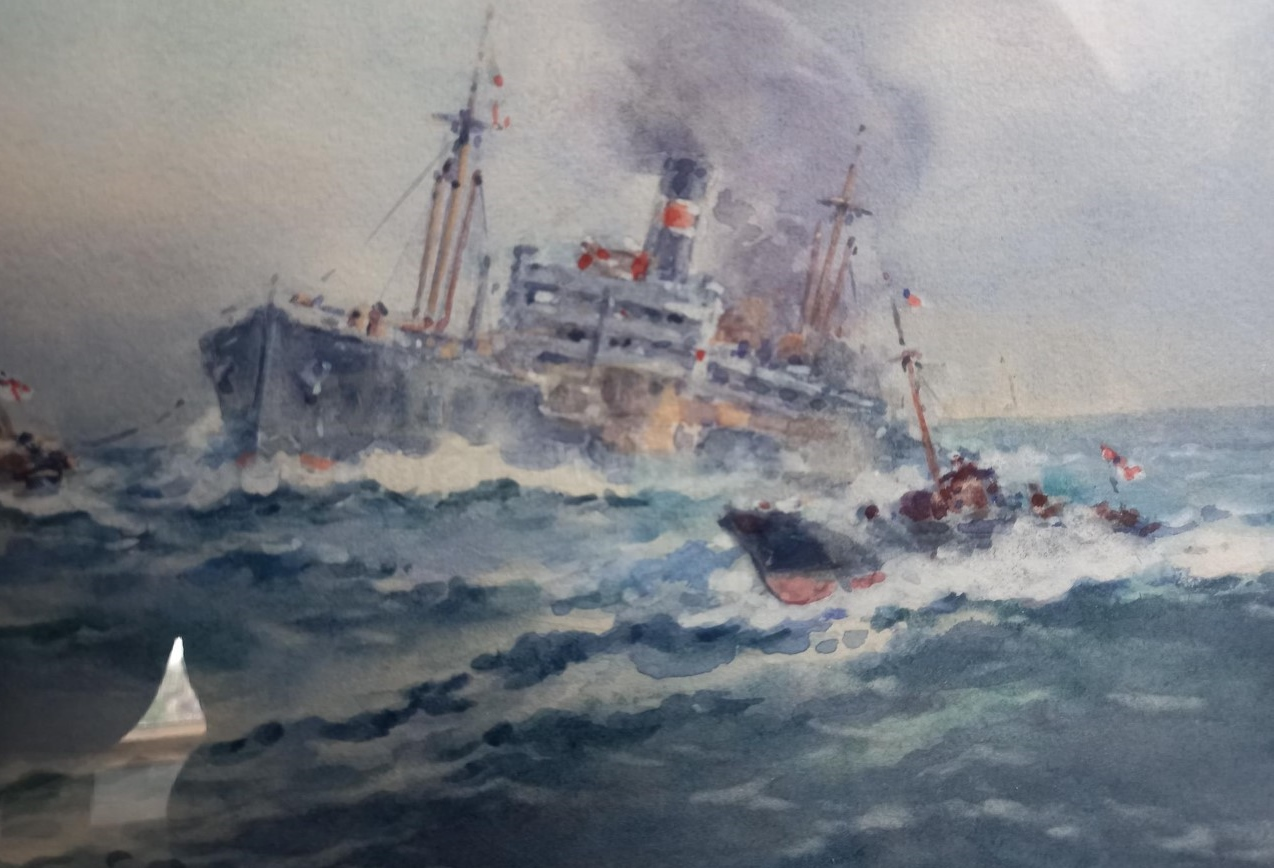
Torpedoed convoy ship at sea (1943).

During the 1930s Frank Wood had developed his craft so well that he was freely allowed to watch and paint some of the most well known ships in the British fleet at that time, for example HMS Hood, HMS Barham and HMS Royal Oak.

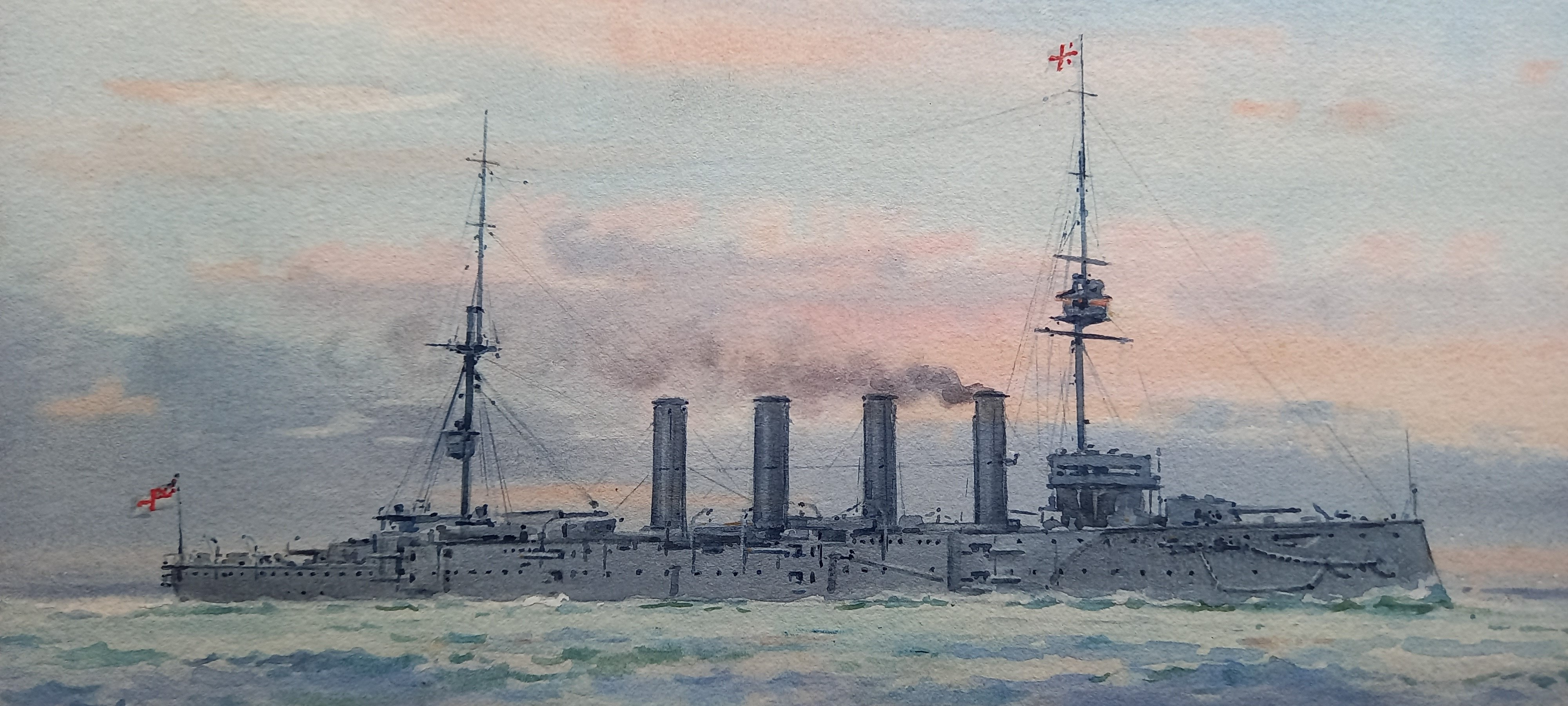
British cruiser (1913).

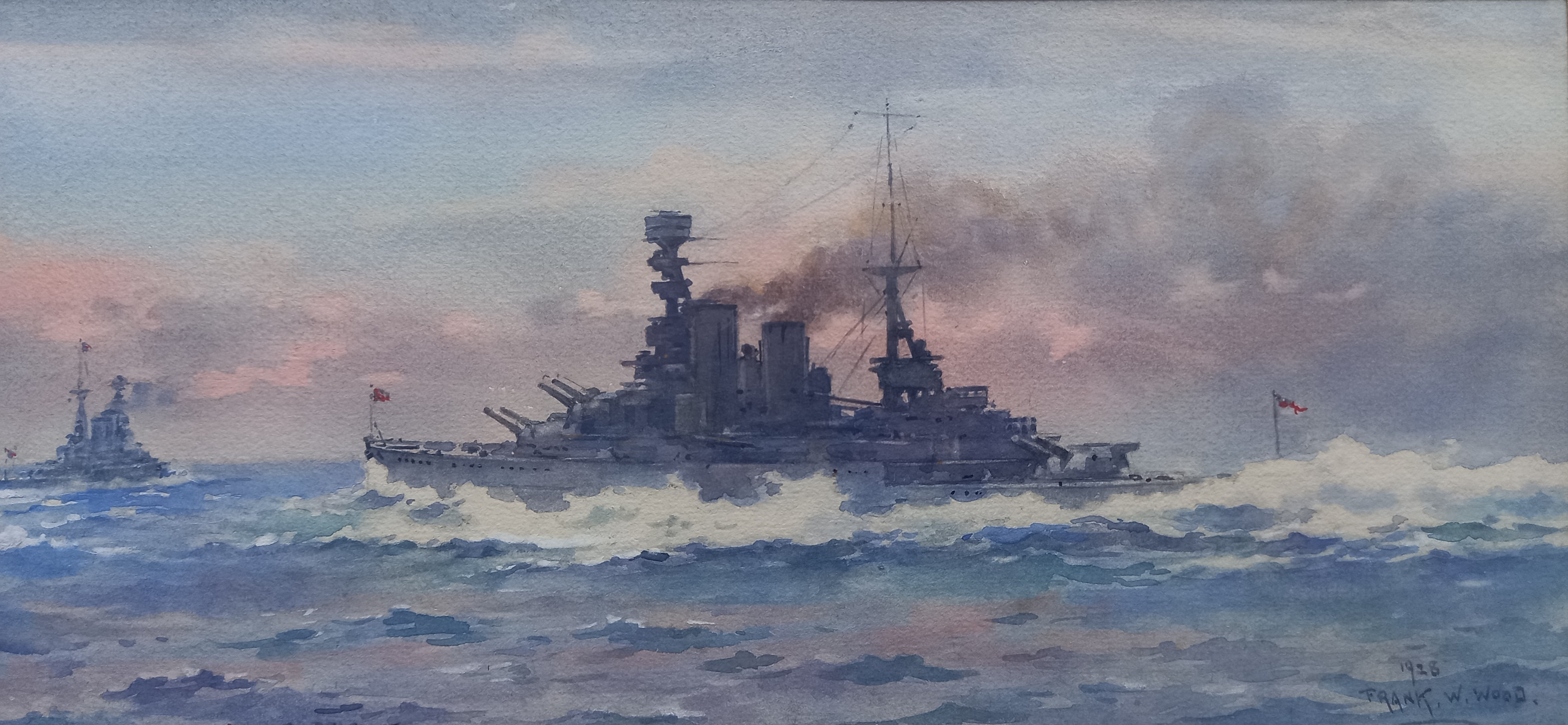
HMS Renown (1928).

=== World War Two ===
During World War Two, Wood created also paintings to commemorate some of the major events of the war that had a naval component for example "The Epic of Dunkirk" and "Graf Spee and the Battle of The River Plate".

== Legacy and death ==
Frank Wood was a talented painter of British Royal Navy warships and landscapes. With the resurgence of interest in naval pictures in the 1990s, his paintings became and still are highly sought after at auction. His attention to detail and ability to capture the spirit of a ship at sea of in port make his paintings unique - this was no doubt partly due to his own naval service. His final years were spent in Perthshire and he died at Dochfour, Strathyre in 1953 at the age of 91. Many of his paintings are in private collections and others can be found in the National Maritime Museum in Greenwich.

== Words ==
- "Cowes"
- "Edinburgh from The Braids"
- "Linlithgow Palace"
- "Springtime on the River Tweed"
- "Mordington House" (1932)
- "A View of Berwick-upon-Tweed"
- "Topography of Berwick"
- "Gullane" (1933)
- "HMS Lion" (1930)
- "The epic of Dunkirk" (1940)
- "HMS Hood" (1920)
- "HMS Hood" (1938)
- "HMS Edinburgh" (1906)
- "HMS Revenge" (1918)
- "HMS King Edward VII and The Channel Fleet" (1908)
- "HMS Sylvia" (1904)
- "Review of the fleet off Torbay" (1922)
- "French Warship Dakar" (1940)
- "Graf Spee and the Battle of the River Plate" (1939)
- "HMS Royal Oak leaving Plymouth"
- "HMS Karakatta" (1906)
- "Dreadnought, Portsmouth Harbour" (1910)
- "Paddle tug & Fishing boats" (1900)
- "The Hamoaze" (1935)
- "HMS Emperor of India at Scapa Flow" (1918)
- "Britannia Royal Naval College" (1928)
- "HMS Tiger" (1919)
- "1st Cruiser Squadron" (1918)
