= Charles Douglas, 5th Lord Mordington =

Charles Douglas, 5th Lord Mordington (d. after 1746), son of George Douglas, 4th Lord Mordington by his wife Catherine née Lauder, was a Jacobite.

He went to sea when he was young and did not return to Britain until after his father's death.

Engaging in the 1745 Jacobite rebellion, he was captured at Carlisle, and tried on 11 September 1746 under the designation of Charles Douglas, Esquire. He then pleaded his peerage, which was objected to by the counsel for the Crown, but upon proof being provided his trial was postponed and he was imprisoned on remand in Carlisle Castle, from which he was soon released.

Upon the abolition of heritable jurisdictions the following year, he claimed for the privilege of Regality over the lands of Nether Mordington the sum of £300 which was refused.

His estates were forfeited. He was unmarried and upon his death the title became dormant, although his sister Mary styled herself 'Baroness Mordington' after his death. She died without issue.
