= James Angus =

James Angus may refer to

- James Angus (artist) (born 1970), Australian sculptor
- James Angus (scientist) (born 1949), Australian pharmacologist
- James Stout Angus (1830–1923), Shetland writer
