= Ian Angus =

Ian Angus may refer to:

- Ian Angus (activist) (born 1945), Canadian socialist and ecosocialist activist
- Ian Angus (footballer) (born 1961), Scottish former footballer
- Ian Angus (librarian) (1926–2022), British librarian and editor
- Ian Angus (philosopher) (born 1949), Canadian interdisciplinary philosopher

== See also ==
- Iain Angus (born 1947), Canadian politician
