= George Douglas, 4th Lord Mordington =

George Douglas, 4th Lord Mordington, died 10 June 1741 at Covent Garden, London, was the son and heir of James Douglas, 3rd Lord Mordington by his wife Anne, daughter of Alexander Seton, 1st Viscount of Kingston. On 16 November 1704 Douglas married Mary Dillon (d. ca. 1745), an Irish catholic. He was imprisoned for debt at Newgate on 22 April 1706, and was in prison when he succeeded to the title of Lord Mordington. He abandoned his wife soon afterwards and repudiated the marriage, though she insisted on styling herself Lady Mordington. Mordington "went through a form of marriage" with Catherine (d. June 1741) daughter of Dr. Robert Lauder, Rector of Shenley, Hertfordshire, by his wife Mary, née Snow.

A political writer, Mordington obtained a prominent mention in Walpole's Royal and Noble Authors (Parks edition, vol.v, p. 147) as the author of a work called The Great Blessing of a Monarchical Government – "when fenced about with and bounded by the laws, and these laws secured and observed by the monarch". Mordington added "that as a Popish government is inconsistent with the true happiness of these kingdoms, so great also are the miseries and confusions of anarchy. Most humbly dedicated to His Majesty by George Douglas, Lord Mordington, London, 1724."

Two pieces against a weekly paper called the Independent Whig are also mentioned by Walpole as being written by Lord Mordington.

Mordington and his acknowledged wife Catherine had three children:

- their son and heir: Charles Douglas, 5th Lord Mordington, a Jacobite;

and two daughters:

- Campbellina,
- Mary (d.22 July 1791) de jure Baroness Mordington, who married William Weaver, an Officer in the Royal Horse Guards (d. 28 April 1796, Hallow Park, Worcestershire, England), who fought at the battle of Dettingen and the battle of Fontenoy.

== Bibliography ==
- Philip, Carter (2004). "Douglas, George, fourth Lord Mordington". Oxford Dictionary of National Biography (online ed.). Oxford University Press. doi:10.1093/ref:odnb/7887. (Subscription, Wikipedia Library access or UK public library membership required.)
- Eglin, John (2023). The Gambling Century: Commercial Gaming in Britain from Restoration to Regency. Oxford University Press. p. 142.
- The Peerage of Scotland. Peter Brown, Edinburgh. 1834. p. 176.
- Anderson, William (1867). The Scottish Nation, vol.7. p. 206.
