= William Douglas, 9th Earl of Angus =

Scottish nobleman (1533–1591)

William Douglas, 9th Earl of Angus (1533 – 1 July 1591, at Glenbervie) was a Scottish nobleman and zealous supporter of Mary, Queen of Scots.

== Biography ==
Douglas was the eldest son of Sir Archibald Douglas of Glenbervie, Knt., by his spouse Agnes, daughter of William Keith, 3rd Earl Marischal, and upon the death of Archibald Douglas, 8th Earl of Angus without issue, William succeeded to that Earldom as heir-male, in 1588.

Sir Robert Douglas states that "Sir William Douglas of Glenbervie [as he was styled prior to his succession to the earldom] was a man of great honour and integrity, and a steady friend of Queen Mary". He accompanied her in her expedition to the north, and behaved with utmost fortitude and resolution at the battle of Corrichie in 1562".

He had two charters under The Great Seal of Scotland, from Queen Mary, of the lands and barony of Glenbervie, Kemnay, and several others.

According to David Hume of Godscroft, Angus and Lord John Hamilton argued over precedence in the king's privy or outer chamber at Holyrood Palace. James VI came out of his bed chamber and made them reconcile. Meanwhile, Sir John Carmichael, Captain of the Guard, had made the palace secure, and Angus had to signal to his followers from a window that all was well.

The earldom was claimed by James VI, who brought a suit against Douglas, for reducing the charters connected with the title, but on 7 March 1589, a decision was given in favour of the latter.

In 1590, the Earl of Angus bore the sword at the coronation of Anne of Denmark in St Giles, Edinburgh.

Douglas died in July 1591, in his 59th year.

== Family ==
The earl married Giles, daughter of Sir Robert Graham of Morphie, and had six sons and four daughters:

- William Douglas, 10th Earl of Angus, eldest son and heir,
- Archibald Douglas, Parson of Glenbervie (d. 1584).
- George Douglas (d. 1590), who attended James VI in Denmark.
- Sir Robert Douglas of Glenbervie, received from his father the lands of Glenbervie by charter dated 14 July 1592.
- Duncan Douglas, Parson of Glenbervie (d.1591)
- Gavin Douglas (d. bef 1 October 1616) who married Elizabeth Keith; ancestors of the family of Douglas of Bridgeford
- Sir John Douglas of Barras
- Francis Douglas (d.c. 1600)
- Henry Douglas of Tannachy (d. 5 October 1595) who married Janet Murray at sometime before 1580. Had issue Janet Douglas born 16 April 1580 Dunfermline Scotland.
- Margaret Douglas, married William Forbes of Monymusk
- Jean Douglas, married John Wishart of Balisycht
- Elizabeth Douglas, married Thomas Gordon of Cluny
- Sarah Douglas, married 1st Robert Strachan, 2nd George Auchinleck of Balmanno

== Notes ==
Peerage of Scotland
Preceded by Archibald Douglas	Earl of Angus; 1588–1591	Succeeded by William Douglas
