= George Angus =

George Angus may refer to:

- George Angus (footballer) (1875–1917), Australian rules footballer
- George Angus (printer) (1784–1808), Tyneside printer and publisher
- George Angus (architect) (1792–1845), Scottish architect
