= John Angus (minister) =

English independent minister

John Angus (1724–1801), was an English independent minister.

Angus was born at Styford, near Hexham, Northumberland, in 1724, was sent at the age of 16 to the university of Edinburgh. Two years later he removed to London, and in 1748 he took charge of the independent congregation at Bishop's Stortford, Hertfordshire. For nearly 54 years he exercised his ministry in that town, where he died 22 December 1801. He published some occasional discourses, including a funeral sermon on the death of the Rev. D. Parry (1770), and another on the death of the Rev. T. Davidson (1788).
