= William Douglas, 2nd Lord Mordington =

William Douglas, 2nd Lord Mordington (27 September 1626 – after 1671) was the eldest son and heir of Sir James Douglas, 1st Lord Mordington (died 1656) by his spouse Anne, daughter of Lawrence Oliphant, 5th Lord Oliphant.

In the first parliament of King Charles II in Edinburgh in January 1661, a protest was lodged by Lord Mordington and the Earl of Hartfell on behalf of the young Earl of Angus (who became the 2nd Marquess of Douglas), that his absence (due to being under-age) should not prejudice his hereditary claim to the first vote in Parliament, to leading the van in battle, and to carrying the Crown at the riding of Parliament. Two Dukes, Hamilton and Lennox, challenged this claim, but it was confirmed by an Order of the Privy Council in 1669.

This Lord Mordington was responsible for the reconstruction of the wall and stone entrance to the burial vault containing Black Agnes.

The 2nd Lord Mordington appears to have been in debt, doubtless due to the prevailing wartime scenario in Scotland, and the disruption to agriculture, and there are a great many papers in the National Archives of Scotland in this respect. An example (GD206/1/47) is a Great Seal charter of confirmation of a bond, dated 23 September 1667, by William, Lord Mordingtoun, to William Dowglas, advocate, for £2000 Scots and an annual rent of £120 Scots from the lands and barony of Chirnside and teinds thereof in the parish of Chirnsyde and sheriffdom of Berwick.

Confirmation in the register is dated 7 July 1671, by which time Lord Mordington is thought to have died.

He married Elizabeth, daughter of Hugh Sempill, 5th Lord Sempill, and had the following issue:

- James Douglas, 3rd Lord Mordington (b.1651), his son and heir.
- William (b.1653).
- Lewis (d. 7 July 1682, Westminster, London, England).
- Francis (b.1655).
- Anne, married c1690 Patrick Porterfield in Comiston.
