= William Douglas, 10th Earl of Angus =

16th and 17th-century Scottish nobleman

William Douglas
- Earl of Angus
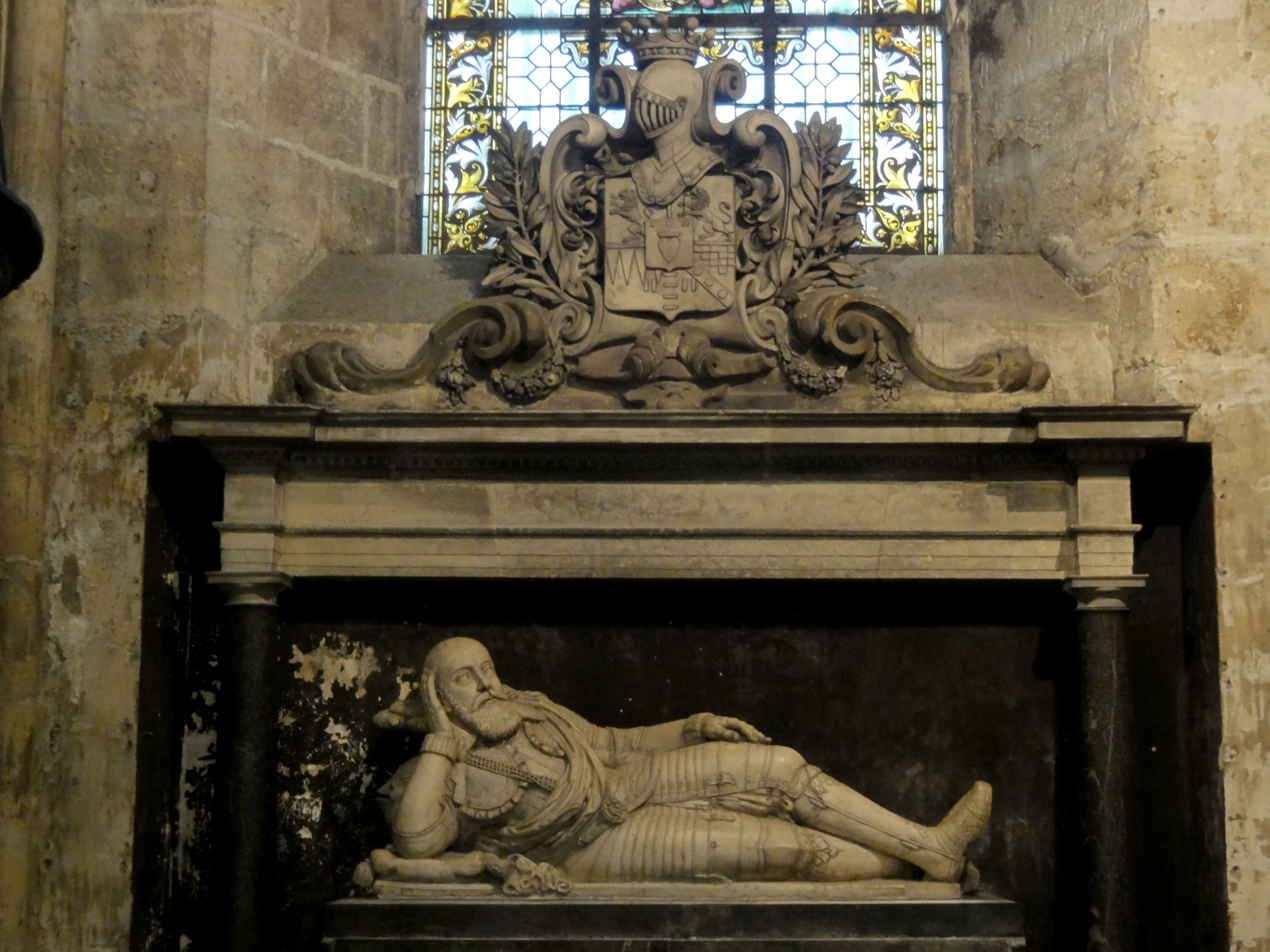
- Tomb of the 10th Earl of Angus
- Predecessor: William Douglas, 9th Earl of Angus
- Successor: William Douglas, 11th Earl of Angus
- Other titles: Lord Abernethy; Lord Bonkyll & Preston; Lord Jedburgh Forest
- Born: 15 March 1554
- Died: 3 March 1611 (aged 56); Paris, France
- Buried: Abbey of Saint-Germain-des-Prés
- Noble family: Angus
- Spouse: Lady Elizabeth Oliphant
- Issue: William Douglas, 1st Marquess of Douglas; James Douglas, 1st Lord Mordington; Sir Francis Douglas; Lady Catherine Kerr; Mary Livingstone, Countess of Linlithgow; Lady Elizabeth Campbell
- Father: William Douglas, 9th Earl of Angus
- Mother: Egidia Graham

William Douglas, 10th Earl of Angus (1554 – 3 March 1611) was a Scottish nobleman. He was the son of William Douglas, 9th Earl of Angus (1533–1591).

== Career ==
Douglas studied at St. Andrews University and joined the household of the Earl of Morton. Subsequently, while visiting the French court, he became a Catholic, and was in consequence, upon his return, disinherited and placed under restraint.

Nevertheless, Douglas succeeded to his father's titles and estates in 1591, and though in 1592 he was disgraced for his complicity in Lord Bothwell's plot, he was soon liberated and performed useful services as the King's Lieutenant in the north of Scotland. In June 1592 he was injured falling from his horse while hunting with James VI and sent for drugs from the surgeon Gilbert Primrose.

In July 1592 he asked for help from Queen Elizabeth in a plot with the Earl of Erroll and other lords against John Maitland of Thirlestane, the Chancellor. Lord Maxwell accused him of misdemeanours including meeting the rebels James Douglas of Spott and the Countess of Bothwell. He protested his absolute rejection of Spanish offers, but in October he signed the Spanish Blanks. On the discovery of this treason he was imprisoned in Edinburgh Castle on his return to Scotland in January 1593.

Douglas escaped from Edinburgh Castle on 13 February 1593 with the help of his Countess, joining the Earls of Huntly and Erroll in the north. They were offered an Act of "oblivion" or "abolition" provided they renounced their religion or quit Scotland. Declining these conditions they were declared traitors and "forfeited."

They remained in rebellion, and in July 1594 an attack made by them on Aberdeen roused James's anger. Huntly and Erroll were subdued by James himself in the north, and Angus failed in an attempt upon Edinburgh in concert with the Earl of Bothwell.

Subsequently, in 1597 they all renounced their religion, declared themselves Presbyterians, and were restored to their estates and honours. Angus was again included in the Privy Council, and in June 1598 was appointed the King's Lieutenant in southern Scotland, in which capacity he showed great zeal and conducted the "Raid of Dumfries," as the campaign against the Johnstones was called. At Christmas time in 1598 the English diplomat George Nicholson heard that people were saying Angus wore a jewel resembling a cross in his hat (which might be taken a sign of Catholicism), but the king said it was not and laughed at their daftness.

Angus, offended at the advancement of Huntly to a Marquessate, recanted, resisted all the arguments of the ministers to bring him to a "better mind," and was again excommunicated in 1608.

In 1609 Douglas withdrew into exile, and died in Paris, France, on 3 March 1611. He is buried at the Abbey of Saint-Germain-des-Prés.

== Household accounts ==
A household account for the Earl survives. It commences on 11 June 1608 when the Earl moved his lodging in Glasgow from the house of George Lyon to that of John Ross. In October he moved to the Canongate of Edinburgh. On 5 November he moved to Tantallon Castle.

== Quotation ==
From The Scottish Nation:

William, ..., tenth earl, was well versed in the antiquities and history of his country, and wrote a chronicle of the Douglases. Becoming a Roman Catholic, he, in 1592, engaged with the earls of Errol and Huntly in the treasonable plot of obtaining the King of Spain's assistance for the reestablishment of popery in Scotland, and on the 1st of the following January he was seized and committed to the castle of Edinburgh. On the 15th of February, however, he made his escape, and joined the other two earls in the north. On the 11th October, they came suddenly into the king's presence, and offered to submit themselves to trial. On the 26th November, it was determined that they and their associates should be exempted from all farther inquiry or prosecution on account of their correspondence with Spain, and that before the 1st of February 1594, they should either submit to the church, and renounce popery, or remove out of the kingdom. They refused to accede to these conditions, and continued their treasonable negotiations. After the battle of Glenlivet, 3d October of the same year, in which, however, he was not present, Angus retired to the continent, and spent the remainder of his life in acts of devotion. He died at Paris 3d March 1611, in the 57th year of his age, and was buried in the church of St. Germain de Prez, where a magnificent monument was erected to his memory, the inscription on which is printed at length in the Scots Magazine for 1767. By his countess, Elizabeth, eldest daughter of Lawrence Oliphant, 4th Lord Oliphant, he had three sons and two daughters; James, the second son, was the first Lord Mordington, see that title.

== Marriage and children ==
Douglas married Elizabeth Oliphant, a daughter of Laurence Oliphant, 4th Lord Oliphant, in spring 1585, and they had three sons and three daughters. His second son, James, was created Lord Mordington in 1641. His daughter Mary was married to Alexander Livingston, 2nd Earl of Linlithgow.

Name	Birth	Death	Notes
William Douglas, 1st Marquess of Douglas	1589	19 February 1659	Married 1st Lady Margaret Hamilton, 2nd, Lady Mary Gordon; had issue.
James Douglas, 1st Lord Mordington	1591	11 February 1656	Married Lady Anne Oliphant and Lady Elizabeth Hay; had issue.
Sir Francis Douglas of Sandilands	1593
Lady Catherine Douglas	1595		Married Sir Andrew Kerr
Lady Mary Douglas	1597		Married Alexander Livingston, 2nd Earl of Linlithgow; had issue.
Lady Elizabeth Douglas	1599		Married Sir John Campbell

Douglas was succeeded by his son William, as 11th earl of Angus, afterwards 1st marquess of Douglas (1580–1660). The title Earl of Angus is now held by the Duke of Hamilton, and is used as a courtesy title for the eldest son of the heir apparent to the current dukedom.

Peerage of Scotland
Preceded by William Douglas	Earl of Angus; 1591–1611	Succeeded by William Douglas
