= Tom Angus (cricketer) =

English cricketer

Personal information
- Full name: Thomas Angus
- Born: 23 November 1934; Gateshead, County Durham, England
- Died: 14 May 1988 (aged 53); Englefield Green, Surrey, England
- Batting: Left-handed
- Bowling: Right-arm fast-medium

Domestic team information
- Years: Team
- 1962–1967: Durham
- 1956–1957: Middlesex

Career statistics
Competition	First-class
Matches	7
Runs scored	49
Batting average	8.16
100s/50s	-/-
Top score	18*
Balls bowled	890
Wickets	23
Bowling average	15.34
5 wickets in innings	-
10 wickets in match	-
Best bowling	4/81
Catches/stumpings	5/-
- Source: , 14 August 2008

Thomas Angus (born 23 November 1934 – 14 May 1988) was an English first-class cricketer who played for Middlesex. His highest score of 18* came when playing for Middlesex in the match against Kent. His best bowling of 4/81 came when playing for Middlesex in the match against Oxford University.

He also played 19 Minor Counties Championship games, mostly Middlesex Second XI, but also for Durham.
