= Gilbert Cavan =

- Bishop of Galloway (elect)
- Church: Roman Catholic Church
- See: Diocese of Galloway
- In office: 1412 × 1415-1415
- Predecessor: Elisaeus Adougan
- Successor: Thomas de Buittle
- Previous posts: Rector of Carnesmole/Kirkinner; Archdeacon of Galloway

Orders
- Ordination: before 1402
- Consecration: none

Personal details
- Born: unknown Probably Dumfriesshire or Galloway
- Died: 1420

Gilbert Cavan (died 1420) was a cleric based primarily in Galloway in the early 15th century, a servant of the earls of Douglas and briefly Bishop of Galloway-elect. His name is also written Caven, Cawan, Caben, with other variants, perhaps representing Gaelic or Irish Cabhan, although the name is not locational, it is a dictus rather than a de name.

== Biography ==
=== Background ===
Much about his early background rests on whether or not Gilbert Cavan was the clerk who was granted expectative provision on 1 June 1381, to a vicarage under Holyrood Abbey and then another vicarage under Kelso Abbey on 21 December. If this was Gilbert Cavan seeking benefices as early as 1381, then he would have been 24 years old or over at that date, and thus born before 1357. Likewise his student days may have begun as early as 1381, but he is not known to have had any academic award until 1 May 1406, and is not given any academic title even as late as 1402. It is doubtful that this was Gilbert Cavan, especially as he disappears from records for more than two decades. A letter from Antipope Benedict XIII in late summer 1400 provided one Gilbert Oliverei, "perpetual vicar of Caerlaverock, to the parish church of Kyrkynner, alias Carnismole". According to the view of Professor Donald Watt, this Gilbert Oliverei ("[son] of Oliver") is probably not Gilbert Cavan either, but a namesake rival, though this is admitted to be rather tentative. It is known for certain though that by 1406, he held a bachelorate in Decrees (i.e. Canon Law); in English safe-conducts dating to 1412/3, he is styled Magister (i.e. Master), but this title is doubtful as he is never styled so in papal letters. He studied at the University of Paris.

=== Early career in the church ===
A letter from Antipope Benedict XIII, dated 15 September 1402, addressed Gilbert as rector of the parish church of Carnemol (Carnesmole, now Kirkinner in Farines, Wigtownshire), and confirmed him as rector of that church after the death of the previous rector Domhnall MacDomhnaill. The letter mentioned that, upon the death of Domhnall, Archibald Douglas, 4th Earl of Douglas, who had the right of presentation, presented Gilbert to Stephen [de Malcavston], Prior of St Mary's Isle, the prelate acting as vicar general of spiritualities in the diocese of Galloway while Bishop Thomas de Rossy was abroad. Gilbert is said to have doubted the validity of this process, and thus the papal letter was issued in order to confirm Gilbert in his position as rector of Carnesmole. A repetition of this letter was issued on 1 May 1406, addressed to the abbot of Sainte Geneviève (University of Paris), the abbot of Glenluce, and the chancellor of Noyon, now styling Gilbert a Bachelor of Decrees.

=== Bishop and Archdeacon of Galloway ===
Sometime between 1412 and 1415, probably in the latter year, the chapter of Whithorn elected Gilbert to succeed the late Elisaeus Adougan as Bishop of Galloway; but, despite travelling to the papal court in Spain, Gilbert failed to obtain papal confirmation, and the papal chaplain and auditor, Thomas de Buittle, Archdeacon of Galloway, was provided to the bishopric instead by Antipope Benedict XIII on 14 June 1415. This probably occurred against the will of the Douglas family, to whom Cavan was a senior clerk. Perhaps in compensation, six days later (20 June) Gilbert received provision to the now vacant archdeaconry of Galloway, a position Cavan held only very shortly, for he resigned it on exchange with John Gray sometime before 20 May 1417. On 3 July 1415, he was given a canonry in the diocese of Moray with the prebend of Invecheclyn (i.e. Inverkeithny, Strathbogie), being permitted to retain Carnesmole. The Antipope had earlier allowed him to retain the parish church of Carnesmole even after becoming archdeacon. He received the church of Kirkandrews (Purton), near Borgue in Kirkcudbrightshire.

=== Service to the Douglases ===
Gilbert was a clerk and associate of the earls of Douglas. A papal letter of 1406 mentioned that he was "chaplain and familiar" of Princess Margaret, Duchess of Touraine, and tutor to her first-born son, Archibald. He made several trips to England in 1412 and 1413 in connection with the earl's ransom, and was one of several clerks that the earl used as ambassadors and messengers. He remained a clerk of the earl of Douglas until 1420, the year of his death. He died at some point between 19 August and 22 November 1420.

== Notes ==
Religious titles
Preceded by Elisaeus Adougan	Bishop of Galloway; Elect only 1412 × 1415-1415	Succeeded by Thomas de Buittle
Preceded by Thomas de Buittle	Archdeacon of Galloway; 1415-1415 × 1417	Succeeded by John Gray
