= Vass of Lochslin =

The Vass family (sometimes spelt Vaus, Wass or Waus) were a minor noble Scottish family, but also recognised septs of the Clan Ross and Clan Munro, both Scottish clans of Ross-shire in the Scottish Highlands.

== History ==
=== Origins in Scotland ===
The names Vass and Wass were originally de Vallibus or Vaux and were derived from John Vaux or de Vallibus who was a Norman settler and who witnessed a charter in Kincardine, Sutherland by Alexander III of Scotland in 1252.

=== Scottish clan affiliations ===
As the Munros and Rosses were closely associated, it was only natural that their dependents are found having served both families.

== Castle ==
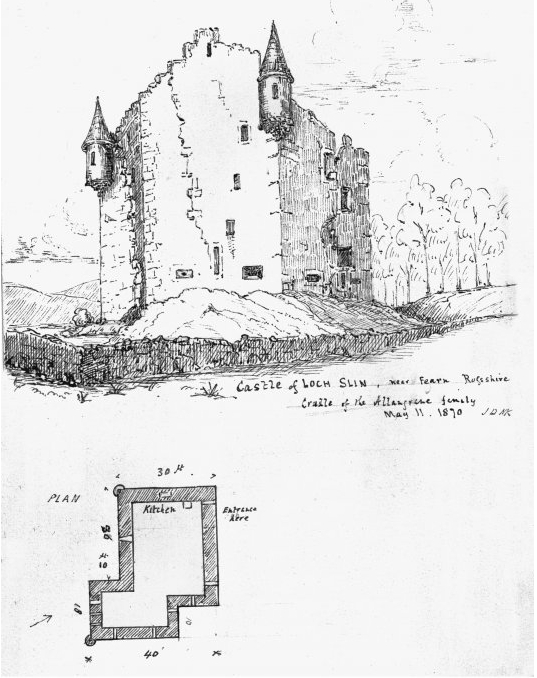
Loch Slin Castle (Lochslin) as drawn in 1870 near Fearn, Highland, where the Vass family were seated

The Vasses were seated at Lochslin Castle in Easter Ross from the 15th-century until 1603 when they were declared rebels. The castle is mentioned in a charter of the Vasses in 1590. Their successors at Lochslin Castle were the Munros of Meikle Tarrel.

== Lairds of Lochslin ==
=== Origins in Lochslin ===
The earliest reference to the Vasses of Lochslin in Easter Ross is in a charter confirming the lands of Bambarroch in Wigtown, in south-west Scotland, where John Vass of Lochslin is named as brother of Robert Vass of Barnbarroch in 1457. Robert had acquired these lands just five years before and this could have been attributed to the influence of Alexander Vaus or Vass who was the Bishop of Galloway. The bishop had already given a charter to Robert Vass's daughter, Margaret Vass, and to Robert's son-in-law Thomas McDowall the younger of Garthland. Alexander also had strong ties with the north having previously been the Bishop of Orkney and Caithness. It is not possible to show which is the senior line, the Vasses of Ross-shire or Galloway, but it is possible that both descend from the de Vaux family who owned lands in East Lothian in the 13th century and who built the earliest surviving parts of Dirleton Castle.

It is not known exactly when the Vasses first acquired the lands of Lochslin but they first appear on records in Inverness in 1440.

=== John Vass of Lochslin ===
John Vass of Lochslin appears on record from 1456 to 1545 but clearly this is not always the same person and the records do not show the number of generations with same name: in 1456/7 he is mentioned as a brother of Robert Vass of Barnbarroch in a Crown charter. In 1484, John Vass is recorded as one of the citizens of Tain who granted land in the town on behalf of the community. In 1487, there is a tradition that John Vass of Lochslin was killed at the Battle of Aldy Charrish fighting for the Clan Ross against the Clan Mackay. Historian of the 17th century, Sir Robert Gordon, 1st Baronet records that among those that were slain were: "Alexander Ross of Balnagown, Mr. William Rosse, Alexander Terral, Angus McCulloch of Terrell, William Rosse, John Wasse, William Wasse, John Mitchell, Thomas Wause, Hutcheon Waus."

In 1498, along with Angus MacCulloch of Plaids, John Vass of Lochslin paid 35 merks to a burgess of Dysart in Fife. There is a tradition that Alexander Vass who was sheriff to William Munro, 12th Baron of Foulis was killed supporting him at the Battle of Drumchatt in 1501. According to Clan Munro Association historian, R.W Munro, a Jhonne the Vaus blaze bailie and burgess of the burch of Dyngvalle is recorded in contemporary documents the Munro of Foulis Writs in 1490. He is again recorded as sheriff in this part when he granted a charter to Hector Roy Mackenzie in the king's name for Gairloch in 1494 and it is possible that he was the Sheriff Vass who accompanied William Munro into Mackenzie territory and who was killed at Drumchatt in 1501.

In 1512, John Vass received a royal charter for the lands of Lochslin and Newton which he had resigned into the King's hands. In 1514, he witnessed at Inverness a retour of Lady Elizabeth Gordon to her brother John, Earl of Sutherland. In 1534, he mortgaged the lands of Lochslin and Newton to Robert Vass, burgess of Inverness. In 1536, along with wife Elizabeth Urquhart he obtained a charter for the lands of Lochslin from the King. In 1537/8 he sold the lands of Lochslin and Newton to his relative Robert Vass, burgess of Inverness. In 1544/5 John Vass of Lochslin died, the document says "at the field of ...", which may have been the Battle of Ancrum Moor.

=== Robert Vass ===
Robert Vass, was burgess of Inverness and is on record from 1538 to 1545. He had purchased Lochslin in 1538 but does not appear with the designation of Lochslin and therefore may not have survived John Vass's death for very long.

=== Jasper Vass of Lochslin ===
Jasper Vass of Lochslin is on record from 1542 to 1569. He appears during this time as a burgess and provost of Inverness without any territorial designation but as Jasper Vass of Lochslin in matters outside of the burgh. In 1545/6 he put his name to an Inverness statute directed against the "indrawing of outlandish men of great clans nor able nor qualified to use merchandise nor make daily residence, nor policy, nor any manner of bigging within the said burgh". He witnessed a document as Jasper Vass of Lochslin in 1547. He appears as Provost of Inverness in 1560/61. Jasper Vass last appears as Provost on 1 August 1562 and John Ross his successor appears on 17 October. Jasper Vass remained as a burgess of Inverness with considerable property and he died by 19 December 1572. He had married Elizabeth Dunbar in 1553/4 and their children included John, Robert, Alexander and Katherine.

=== John Vass of Lochslin ===
John Vass of Lochslin is on record from 1567 to 1607 but there may have been more than one generation with this name. In 1567, John Vass, son of Jasper Vass, produced a charter of the lands of Diriebucht in Inverness. In 1578, John Vass of Lochslin appears on record as a burgess of Inverness. In 1578/9 he received a royal charter confirming his purchase of part of the lands of Arkboll from Alexander Ross of Little Tarrell. In 1580, he agrees with a precept from the Convention of Royal Burghs for burgesses to only live in their own burghs for the rest of the year, which he agrees to. In 1585, he is mentioned in a commission with his son John. In 1587/8 he was a bailie for William Keith of Delny but when he tried to hold a baron court was interrupted by armed men. In 1589/90 he mortgaged to his brother, Alexander, half of the lands of Lochslin, reserving the castle and its garden for himself. In 1591, John Vass of Lochslin and his heirs appear in a confirmation charter of the lands of Barnbarroch in Galloway - which they would later inherit. In 1600, with the consent of his wife, Katherine, John Vass of Lochslin gave to his brother, Alexander who was a merchant burgess of Edinburgh, a charter of feu for lands in Lochslin. In 1605, Alexander received a charter for more of John's lands at Over Pitneilies. In 1607, with the consent of his son second son, David Vass, John Vass sold parts of the lands of Allan to John Munro of Fearn, witnessed by his sons, Alexander and Jasper Vass.

=== John Vass of Lochslin ===
John Vass of Lochslin is on record from 1608 to 1610. He was the last Vass to own Lochslin, retreating into the relative anonymity of a burgess of Inverness. He appears on 28 April 1608 in connection with his lands in Inverness, as his father's eldest son, and the witnesses are his younger brothers, David and Jasper. On 14 April 1609, he was retoured heir to his father in the lands of Lochslin and Newton, Over Pitneilies and Pittogarti. With the consent of his brothers, David, Jasper, James and Alexander, he sold the lands of Over Pitneilies to George Munro of Meikle Tarrel on 7 August/24 September 1610. The rest of the lands of Lochslin soon followed into the hands of George Munro, who on 27 May 1622 sold the lands of Lochslin and Newton, Inver of Lochslin and Over Pitneilies to James Cuthbert of Drakies. In 1624, the lands passed from Cuthbert to John, second son of Kenneth Mackenzie, 1st Lord Mackenzie of Kintail. Upon John Mackenzie's death the lands went to his younger brother, Simon Mackenzie, who was father of George Mackenzie of Rosehaugh.

== See also ==
- Vass (disambiguation)
- Wass (disambiguation)
- Vaus
