= Ninian Spot =

- Bishop of Galloway
- Church: Roman Catholic Church
- See: Diocese of Galloway
- In office: 1458-1480 × 1482
- Predecessor: Thomas Spens/Thomas Vaus
- Successor: George Vaus
- Previous post(s): Treasurer of Dunkeld

Orders
- Consecration: 1459

Personal details
- Born: unknown unknown
- Died: 1480 × 1482

Ninian Spot [de Spot] (died 1480 × 1482) was a royal clerk and prelate in the 15th century Kingdom of Scotland. He spent much of his youth at university, eventually obtaining Master's Degree.

He can be found as Comptroller of the Rolls (compotorum rotulator) in 1456, 1457 and in 1459; in such a role his name occurs frequently in the Register of the Great Seal of Scotland, which also mentions that he was a canon of Dunkeld Cathedral. This is certain, as he is found in the Bargany Papers as Treasurer of the diocese of Dunkeld on 24 September 1454. The prebend was presumably the church of Menmure, which was taken by John Balfour, later Bishop of Brechin, after Ninian became Bishop of Galloway in 1458/9. Before becoming Bishop of Galloway (or Whithorn), he had also held the parish church of Nelbland, probably Newlands in the diocese of Glasgow, which is mentioned in papal documents because it became vacant upon Spot's accession to the bishopric.

He was provided to the bishopric of Galloway on 15 December 1458, after the second and successful translation of the former bishop Thomas Spens to the bishopric of Aberdeen; the first translation of Spens had been unsuccessful, and so his first replacement, Thomas Vaus, did not take up the bishopric. It is not clear why Spot rather than Vaus became bishop on the second occasion. Spot was consecrated sometime between 12 March and 16 April 1459, and was granted the temporalities of the see on 27 April.

As Bishop of Whithorn, Ninian attended the parliaments of 1459, 1462, 1467, 1476 and that of 1 June 1478. He continued his work as a government clerk, appearing as a witness to charters under the Great Seal until 1476, his last appearance dating to 22 July 1476; his last appearance as auditor of the exchequer was on 12 June 1480. This is Bishop Ninian's last appearance in any records, and because he is not known to be dead until 9 December 1482, he must have died at some point between these two dates. It was during Ninian's episcopate that Pope Sixtus IV created the Archbishopric of St Andrews, under which Galloway became a suffragan. Although no bishop of Galloway had sworn allegiance to an Archbishop of York since the episcopate of Michael MacKenlagh (1355-1358 × 1359), and although since then the see had been directly under Roman authority, this act made the break with York final.

== Notes ==
Religious titles
Preceded by Thomas Archer	Treasurer of Dunkeld; 1432 × 1454-1454 × 1456 i.e. fl. 1454	Succeeded by Maurice MacNab
Preceded by Thomas Spens/ Thomas Vaus	Bishop of Galloway; 1458-1480 × 1482	Succeeded by George Vaus
