= Vaus =

Vaus is a surname. Notable people with the surname include:

- Alexander Vaus, 15th-century Roman Catholic bishop
- George Vaus (died 1508), Scottish Roman Catholic bishop
- Steve Vaus (born 1952), American country singer-songwriter
- Thomas Vaus, Scottish 15th-century Roman Catholic bishop

== See also ==
- Arkanoid Controller, or Vaus, game controller for the Nintendo Entertainment System
