= Diocese of Galloway (disambiguation) =

The Diocese of Galloway may refer to:

- Diocese of Galloway (1128 - 1560), one of the thirteen (after 1633 fourteen) historical dioceses of the Scottish church
- Roman Catholic Diocese of Galloway (1878- present), modern Roman Catholic diocese resurrected in the late 19th century upon the model of the old diocese, but based at Ayr
- Diocese of Glasgow and Galloway, Scottish episcopal created in the 18th century on the model of two earlier dioceses combined, and based at Glasgow

== See also ==
- Anglo-Saxon Diocese of Whithorn (c. AD 700 - c. 803)
