= Thomas de Buittle =

Scottish prelate (??–1420/22)

- Bishop of Galloway
- Church: Roman Catholic Church
- See: Diocese of Galloway
- In office: 1415–1420; 1422
- Predecessor: Gilbert Cavan
- Successor: Alexander Vaus
- Previous posts: Provost of Maybole; Archdeacon of Galloway

Orders
- Ordination: on or before 1388
- Consecration: 14 June - 5 September 1415

Personal details
- Born: unknown Probably Galloway
- Died: c. 1420–1422

Thomas de Buittle [Butil, Butill, Butyll, Butyl, Bucyl] (died c. 1420–1422) was a Scottish prelate, clerk and papal auditor active in the late 14th and early 15th centuries. Probably originating in Galloway, Scotland, Thomas took a university career in canon law in England and France, before taking up service at the court of Avignon Pope Benedict XIII. He obtained a number of benefices in the meantime, including the position of Archdeacon of Galloway, and is the earliest known and probably first provost of the collegiate church of Maybole. The height of his career came however when the Pope provided him to the bishopric of Galloway, a position he held from 1415 until his death sometime between 1420 and 1422.

== Background and education ==
Thomas' name suggests a strong likelihood that he came from Buittle in Kirkcudbrightshire, Galloway, lands in the control of the Douglas family. In 1388, it was claimed that he had been a scholar of Decrees (i.e. Canon law) at the University of Oxford for five years, a claim to some extent confirmed by the grant of safe-conduct from the English crown on 18 February 1380, to travel and study at Oxford for a year.

By 18 April 1390, he had obtained a Bachelor's degree (in Decrees) from the University of Avignon; he appears in the Avignon university student rolls on 9 August 1393 and again on 21 October 1394. Thomas had obtained a doctorate (in Decrees) sometime between 15 July 1401 and 9 June 1410. He witnessed Bishop Henry de Wardlaw's foundation charter of the University of St Andrews on 28 February 1412 and was named in the grant of privileges made to the new university by Pope Benedict XIII on 28 August 1413.

== First provost of Maybole ==
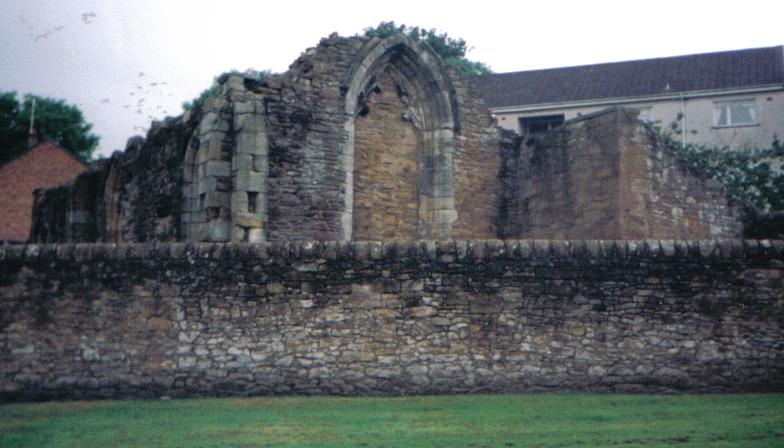
The ruins of collegiate church of Maybole (2005); it was dedicated to St Mary rather than St Cuthbert; St Cuthbert however was the dedication of the parish church.

On 1 February 1388, a letter from Avignon Pope Clement VII to the official of the diocese of Glasgow says that Thomas "holds the provostship of the chapel of St Mary de Mayboyl, Glasgow diocese, which is a simple benefice without cure". The collegiate church of Maybole was founded under the patronage of John Kennedy, Lord of Dunure, a short time before 2 February 1382, when a mandate was issued by the papacy confirming its erection. A year previously the Lord of Dunure had founded a chapel to St Mary beside the parish church of Maybole, and the erection established a provost, two chaplains and a clerk. Thomas de Buittle held the vicarage there. It is possible that Thomas was the senior priest there when it was erected into a collegiate church; Thomas is certainly the earliest known provost, and neither the appointment nor the death of any predecessor are noted anywhere.

He held the vicarage of Lochrutton in Kirkcudbrightshire in 1388, when a papal letter indicated that he was expected to resign Lochrutton after obtaining the benefice of Maybole in the gift of the Prioress of the nunnery of North Berwick. He still held Lochrutton on 18 April 1390, when the letter was repeated. Thomas remained provost of Maybole until at least 1401, and perhaps until his consecration as Bishop of Galloway in 1415. No one else is known to have held the position of provost there until 1439, although this proves nothing as the evidence for such things in the south-west of Scotland in this period is always scarce.

== Archdeacon of Galloway ==
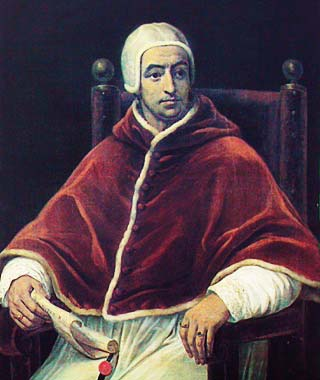
Pope Benedict XIII [of Avignon], Thomas' master and patron.

On 2 March 1391, Thomas was provided by the papacy to be Archdeacon of Galloway. On 23 May a mandate was sent to the senior clergy of the bishopric of Glasgow authorising them to collate Thomas to the archdeaconry of Galloway, at that point occupied "unlawfully" by Patrick Smerles; the mandate gave dispensation for Thomas to retain control of both the provostship of Maybole and the vicarage of Lochrutton. He was still litigating with Smerles on 9 August 1393, by which point in time he had resigned Lochrutton; he was in firm possession of the archdeaconry by 21 October 1394. During his time as Archdeacon of Galloway, the church of Penninghame was annexed as a prebend of the office.

== Papal career and other benefices ==
He resigned the vicarage of Maybole through a proxy (Patrick de Houston) at the papal court on 16 February 1398, in exchange with Gilbert Adounane for the church of Kirkcolm in Wigtownshire. Sweetheart Abbey, overlords of Kirkholm parish, dispossessed him briefly of this benefice, but Thomas obtained papal restitution in a papal mandate dated 13 October 1410. He got papal provision on 5 December 1412, to the politically important vicarage of Dundonald in Kyle, but this was unfruitful as the previous vicar turned out still to be alive. Presumably in its place he obtained the vicarage of Abernyte in the diocese of Dunkeld on 30 January 1413, but despite promising annates, failed to obtain possession.

He did however successfully obtain provision to the church of Kinkell in the diocese of Aberdeen, and the prebend of Inverkeithny in the diocese of Moray with its associated canonry in Elgin Cathedral. As Thomas seems to have spent most of the early 15th century outside Scotland in the employment of the papacy, these positions were probably given to supplement Thomas' income. When he was in Scotland in February 1412 witnessing the foundation charter of St Andrews University, he was said to hold to elevated post of "auditor of the sacred apostolic palace". He had returned to Pope Benedict's court in Spain later in the same year, and can be found conducting various business there over the next few years, both for the papacy and as a proctor for people in Scotland.

== Bishop of Galloway ==
As a reward for his service to the "Avignon Pope", now only recognised in Scotland, Sicily, Aragon and Castile, Thomas was provided to the bishopric of Galloway following the death of Elisaeus Adougan, the previous bishop. This occurred on 14 June 1415. Although the local chapter had elected one Gilbert Cavan, a clerk of the Earl of Douglas, to fill this position, Benedict overturned this election and put Thomas there instead. This probably occurred against the will of the Douglas family, to whom Cavan was a senior clerk. Thomas resigned the archdeaconry of Galloway, with Gilbert Cavan succeeding him there. Presumably in compensation, Gilbert also received Thomas' previous holdings in the dioceses of Moray and Aberdeen. It had been supposed by some authorities that Thomas supported the capitulation of Narbonne, renounced his allegiance to Pope Benedict and supported the adherence to the Council of Constance in December 1415, but this is based on a misreading of the evidence.

It is not clear that, with possible Douglas opposition, Thomas obtained possession of the bishopric smoothly. There is a mandate, dated 5 September 1415, to the subdean of Glasgow Cathedral, ordering the latter to protect "Thomas and his successors in possession of the lands and heredities of Innermasan, Dyrmor, Innysmocrinyl, Kykkenot, Mirtum and Nicoltum in Candida Casa [i.e. Whithorn] diocese ... which are being molested". No more of such problems are heard. Thomas is next found testifying to an inspeximus at Perth on 17 March 1416. This was made by Bishop Henry de Wardlaw of St Andrews on the request of the Council of Constance, a sign of the waning loyalty in Scotland and perhaps in Thomas to the Avignon papacy. Bishop Thomas appears to have been suffering ailing health by 1420. In this year he failed to attend a provincial council of the Scottish church at Perth, although he did send a proctor. He died at some point between 16 July 1420 (date of the council) and 4 December 1422, when Alexander Vaus, Bishop of Caithness, was translated to be Thomas' successor as Bishop of Galloway. Professor Donald Watt believes that his death probably occurred sometime in 1422.

== Notes ==
Religious titles
New creation	Provost of Maybole; 1384; 1388–1401; 1415	Vacant Title next held by John Kennedy
Preceded by Robert Smerles	Archdeacon of Galloway; 1391–1415	Succeeded by Gilbert Cavan
Preceded by Gilbert Cavan	Bishop of Galloway; 1415–1420; 1422	Succeeded by Alexander Vaus
