= Pehthelm =

- Bishop of Candida Casa
- Church: Roman Catholic
- See: Candida Casa
- In office: 730/1 – 735/6
- Predecessor: none
- Successor: Frithwald
- Previous posts: (?) Diocese of Sherborne (deacon) (?) Malmesbury Abbey (monk)

Personal details
- Born: uncertain uncertain
- Died: 735/6 uncertain

Pehthelm (died 735/6) was the first historical bishop of the episcopal see of Candida Casa at Whithorn. He was consecrated in 730 or 731 and served until his demise. His name is also spelled as Pecthelm, Pechthelm, and sometimes as Wehthelm.

Prior to his elevation to bishop he had been a deacon or monk in the Kingdom of Wessex under Aldhelm (later, Saint Aldhelm), the Bishop of Sherborne and founder of the Benedictine Abbey at Malmesbury. He was evidently a person of high repute, as Boniface (later Saint Boniface, and himself of Wessex origin) sought Bishop Pehthelm's advice on an ecclesiastical matter, and sent him a present of a corporal pallium. Pehthelm's historical significance is largely confined to his status as the first bishop in the newly created diocese.

== Background ==
=== Historical context ===
The Kingdom of Northumbria was ascendant from the seventh through the ninth centuries, and it was the premier regional power in Great Britain between the Humber and the Firths of Clyde and Forth. At the Synod of Whitby in 664, King Oswiu repudiated the Celtic Christianity (so called, and also called Columban after its most notable proponent) that had previously been dominant in the northern Northumbrian territory of Bernicia, and aligned Northumbria with the continental church organisation favoured by Northumbria's southern neighbors.

Whatever Oswiu's motivations at Whitby, the move may have been politically expedient, as the Iona-oriented Columban churches and clerics (who were mostly Irish) were now replaced by Northumbria's Anglo-Saxon, York-oriented churches and clerics. However, the authority of the Bishop of York was diluted by Theodore, the Archbishop of Canterbury, who created several bishoprics out of Northumbrian territory, with the intent that they be subordinate to Canterbury rather than to York. York resisted and was ultimately equal to the challenge, as the bishopric was elevated to an archbishopric by the Pope in 735 and was able to oversee its own subordinate bishoprics.

One of York's successful efforts in this power struggle was the supervision of a subordinate bishopric created circa 730 in Galloway, which was then under Northumbrian rule.

=== Pehthelm's name ===
The modern English translations of manuscripts variously spell the name as Pehthelm, Pechthelm, or Pecthelm. Wechthelm, Wettelm, or Wethelm had been offered as alternative possibilities by Thomas Arnold, the editor of an 1879 publication of the 1155 Chronicle of Henry of Huntingdon, which argued that occasionally medieval writers wrongly transcribed old Anglo-Saxon 'w' as 'p'. Similar discussions have revolved around the name of Pybba (or Wybba) of Mercia. Charles Plummer's 1896 edition of Bede's History made note of Arnold's observation, but then went on to translate Pehthelm as 'helm of the Picts', without any stated authority.

== Historical evidence ==
=== Original sources ===
Pehthelm is first mentioned in 731 by Bede (672 – 735) in his Ecclesiastical History of the English People. Bede relates a hagiographic story of a vision in Mercia that is said to have occurred sometime between 704 and 709, and then notes that he heard the story from Pehthelm. In the events of 705, Bede says that Pehthelm was for a long time either deacon or monk with Bishop Aldhelm (639 – 709), and that he was fond of telling stories of miraculous cures associated with the place where Bishop Hedda (d. 705) had died. Finally, in a passage describing the ecclesiastical state of Britain in 731, Bede says that there are four Northumbrian bishops, of which Pehthelm is the one in the place called the White House, and is the first prelate there. He adds that this is a new episcopacy, created because of an increased number of believers.

The 'White House' referred to is the Candida Casa that is first mentioned by Bede himself in his account of Saint Ninian, an account that provides a provenance for Pehthelm's new diocese.

Sometime between 730 and 735 Boniface (c. 672 – 754) writes to Bishop Pehthelm seeking his opinion on the ecclesiastical question of whether a man may marry a woman for whose son he is godfather. Boniface addresses Pehthelm as coepiscopo ('fellow bishop'), and includes gifts of a corporal pallium adorned with white scrolls, and a towel to dry the feet of the servants of God. The letter from the influential Boniface (later Saint Boniface) implies his high regard for Pehthelm's ecclesiastical scholarship, and may also reflect their common ecclesiastical origins in Wessex. Pehthelm's response to the letter is unrecorded.

The Anglo-Saxon Chronicle for 763 states that Pehthelm's successor, Frithwald, had died that year, and provides a rough dating for the start of his episcopacy at Whithorn. This allows the date of Pehthelm's death to be estimated at 735 or 736.

In a very old (811 – 814) manuscript of Northumbrian genealogies, Pehthelm appears first in the list of bishops at Candida Casa. While not an original source per se, the antiquity of the compiled list supports the assertion that Pehthelm was the first bishop at Whithorn, and contradicts later assertions (discussed below) that he was the second bishop. The modern editor of the book that it appears in reasons that it was written in the Kingdom of Mercia by a Northumbrian scribe.

=== Later sources ===
In his Deeds of the Bishops of England (1125), William of Malmesbury briefly mentions Pehthelm as the first bishop at Candida Casa, adding that he was a "disciple" of Aldhelm in "Westsaxonia", and saying that the diocese had later failed due to incursions by the Picts and Scots. This is a repetition of information known from earlier sources, except that the assertion that Pehthelm was Aldhelm's disciple (or pupil) is William's own characterisation.

In the Chronicon ex chronicis (1140), John of Worcester notes that Pehthelm of Candida Casa is one of the four bishops of Northumberland in 731, and that he died in 735 and was succeeded by Frithowald. This is a repetition of information from earlier sources.

=== Conflicted sources ===
The Chronicon ex chronicis (1140) also contains a list of the names of the Bishops of Whithorn located in "The Territory of the Picts", with Pehthelm listed as the second bishop, after Trumwine. Trumwine was consecrated as bishop of the Picts in 681, and his diocese was briefly based at Abercorn, just south of the Firth of Forth. However, this was abandoned after the Pictish victory over the Northumbrians at the Battle of Nechtansmere in 685. By the twelfth century when the Chronicon was written the compiler of the list seems to have assumed it as Trumwine's domain, as in the 12th century Galloway was commonly described as "Pictish" in northern English sources. Bede makes clear that Candida Casa was a new diocese and Pehthelm was its first bishop. In his Annals of Galloway, Ritson notes the error in the Chronicon and condemns the propagation of this mistake by late writers rather vigorously.

Richard of Hexham, writing about 1141, provides yet another medieval chronicle largely repeating the accounts of Bede and the Anglo-Saxon Chronicle, and borrowing from the work of Symeon of Durham. However, he also says that he has heard that Acca of Hexham (c. 660 – c. 742) left his see at Hexham and had a role in the preparations for and founding of the episcopacy of Candida Casa. The suggestion is widely regarded as spurious, as it contradicts all reliable prior sources. Haddan and Stubbs merely note its implausibility, while Skene (who quotes and translates Richard's passage) provides a credible reason as to where the confusion lay.

== Notes ==
Religious titles
Preceded by None	Bishop of Whithorn x731–735	Succeeded by Frithwald
