= Elisaeus Adougan =

Scottish Catholic cleric

- Bishop of Galloway
- Church: Roman Catholic Church
- See: Diocese of Galloway
- In office: 1406–1412 × 1415
- Predecessor: Thomas de Rossy
- Successor: Gilbert Cavan
- Previous post: Provost of Lincluden

Orders
- Consecration: c. 1406 or 1407

Personal details
- Born: Probably Dumfriesshire or Galloway
- Died: 1412 × 1415

Elisaeus Adougan was a late 14th century and early 15th century Scottish Catholic cleric.

His name has been said to have occurred for the first time in a papal letter datable to 25 November 1390, but this letter is simply a repetition of another addressed to him, dated 2 August that year; both letters address him as the rector of the parish church of Kirkmahoe, and authorise him to take up the position of provost of the Collegiate Church of Lincluden providing he resigned Kirkmahoe within a period of two years.

This Collegiate Church, previously a Benedictine nunnery, was erected only on 7 May 1389, after a petition of Archibald Douglas ("the Grim"), Lord of Galloway, to Avignon Pope Clement VII. Papal authorisation came in a letter to the Bishop of Glasgow, inside whose diocese Lincluden lay, which stated:

...as is contained in the petition of Archibald, Lord of Galloway, his predecessors founded and built the monastery of Lincluden, O. CLUN., ... and endowed it for the maintenance of eight or nine nuns, to be ruled by a prioress, while right of patronage remained with the lords of Galloway ...

The letter goes into the details of the monastery's problems and decline, details provided to the papacy by the Lord of Galloway, and asks Bishop Walter Wardlaw:

to ascertain that these facts be true and having transferred the nuns to a house of the Cluniac or Benedictine order, to erect the collegiate church and hospice ...

He still held both Lincluden and Kirkmahoe on 17 May 1391, when the Pope wrote to him providing him to a canonry and prebend of Glasgow Cathedral.

Elisaeus retained his position as provost of Lincluden until 1406. In that year he was elected and received papal provision to the vacant diocese of Galloway. This election was ascribed by historian Michael Brown to the influence of the Lord of Galloway, now Archibald Douglas II. In a lost MacDowall charter, witnessed by Robert Keith and datable to 1412, he was said to have been in his seventh year of consecration. Nothing more is known about Elisaeus's career as Bishop of Galloway; the time of his death is not known either, but he died sometime before 14 June 1415, when there occurs the earliest evidence that a successor for Galloway was needed.

== Notes ==
Religious titles
New title	Provost of Lincluden; 1389 × 1390–1406	Succeeded by Alexander de Carnis
Preceded by Thomas de Rossy	Bishop of Galloway; 1406–1412 × 1415	Succeeded by Gilbert Cavan
