= Rosnat =

Early Celtic Christian monastery

The monastery of Rosnat was an important center of the early Celtic Christianity. Scholars differ as to its actual location. Two locations much discussed are Ninian's Candida Casa at Whithorn in Scotland, and Ty Gwyn overlooking Whitesands Bay (Pembrokeshire).

== History ==
According to Alban Butler, in his youth, Tigernach of Clones "...was carried away by pirates into Britain, and fell into the hands of a British king, who being taken with his virtue, placed him in the monastery of Rosnat." Butler does not indicate a location for Rosnat.

It appears that Rosnat was a double monastery with a separate house for women.

== Possible locations ==
Although the names "Whithorn", "Candida Casa", and "Rosnat" appear to be used interchangeably, there remain different views as to the applicability of the latter.

An alternate name for the "great monastery" was Alba, i.e. "white". This has been used to support claims for

- Candida Casa, from the Latin casa (meaning hut) and candidus/candida (meaning shining or glittering white), ("Shining White House");
- Ty Gwyn - (Welsh for "White" or "Blessed House"); and
- Bangor - ban in Irish signifying "white", Ban-chor meaning "white choir".

=== Whithorn ===
Bishop John Healy identifies the site with Ninian's Candida Casa, near Whithorn in Galloway. "This monastery of Rosnat is by some writers placed in the valley of Rosina, in Wales, where a certain St. Manchen is said to have founded a religious house. We are inclined to agree with Skene that it was rather the celebrated monastery known as Candida Casa, or Whithern, founded by St. Ninian at the extremity of the peninsula of Galloway." (Skene is antiquary William Forbes Skene.)

Irish Church historian John Lanigan identifies Rosnat with Candida Casa, established by Ninian some time before. However, British medievalist and Celtic scholar David Dumville does not find that credible and notes that St. Davids's in Dyfed has also been proposed.

P.A. Wilson says that the development of the cult of Ninian after publication of Bede's Ecclesiastical History caused later editors of vita pertaining to Irish saints who trained in Britain, to identify the unknown Rosnat and its abbot Macannus with Candida Casa and Ninnian. He notes that whether or not Whithorn was Rosnat, it was held in high regard by the Irish, and a number of Irish ecclesiastics may have trained there.

=== Ty Gwyn ===
Mrs. Dawson, writing in the Archaeologia Cambrensis, argues for Ty Gwyn, in Pembrokeshire, pointing out that "Ty Gwyn" is Welsh for "White House". According to John Francis Shearman, the most celebrated abbot of Ty Gwyn was Pawl Hen, also known as Paulinus of Wales or Paulinus of the North (sometimes identified with Paul Aurelian), which he then identified with Ty Gwyn ar Daf in Carmarthenshire. Ty Gwyn ar Dar, which means "White House on the River Taf", is now known as Whitland. Dawson maintains that Shearman is correct in naming Pawl Hen as founder of the monastery, but incorrect in placing Pawl Hen in that Ty Gwyn.

=== Other locations ===
Irish hagiographer and historian John Colgan believed Rosnat or "Alba" was Bangor-on-Dee, founded about AD 560 by Saint Dunod from the preface "ban", meaning "white".

"Dr Breeze, writing in the Welsh Journal of Religious History (Vol 7), is convinced that “Rosnat was surely in Cornwall, near Truro”. This is supported by an old Cornish play on St Kea, which came to light in 2007. It refers to the saint’s place of residence (now called Old Kea) as in Rosewa or Rosene."
