= Roger Gordon =

Scottish cleric

Roger Gordon was a 16th-century Scottish cleric who briefly served as Bishop of Galloway.

== Life ==
He was Dean of Dunblane Cathedral from at least 13 April 1554, a position he may have retained for the remainder of his life.

In 1572 he was minister of Whithorn. He was elected to the bishopric of Galloway on the death of Alexander Gordon in 1575. He got Crown confirmation to the bishopric with mandate for consecration on 17 September 1578.

However, John Gordon had been chosen as successor by Alexander in 1568, 7 years before the latter's death, and John Gordon seems to have prevented Roger from taking up the position of Bishop of Galloway in practice. Roger was called "pretended bishop" on 27 June 1579. Roger never seems to have taken possession of the see.

In 1580 he became minister of Kirkmaiden.

Although Watt says he "died before 12 May 1587" Scott says he returned to Whithorn in 1599.

== Notes ==
Religious titles
Preceded by William Gordon	Dean of Dunblane; 1551 × 1554 – 1577 × 1587	Succeeded by John Johun
Preceded by Alexander Gordon	Bishop of Galloway; 1578 – 1579 × 1587	Succeeded by John Gordon
Preceded by Alexander Gordon	Dean of the Chapel Royal; 1578 – 1579 × 1587	Succeeded by John Gordon
