= Anglo-Saxon Diocese of Whithorn =

The Anglo-Saxon Diocese of Whithorn was a Northumbrian bishopric or diocese of the Anglo-Saxon Church. It was centred on Whithorn, now in Galloway in Scotland, during the 8th century AD. The first known Bishop of Whithorn was Pehthelm.

== Origins ==
According to Anglo-Saxon ecclesiastical tradition, a Pictish church called Candida Casa was founded by Ninian in the late 4th century to early/mid-5th century. Christianity flourished in Galloway in the 6th century and there was possibly a 6th-century Magnum Monasterium, or Monastery of Rosnat in Whithorn during this time.

While there was some relationship between Northumbrian Christianity and that in Galloway in the 7th century, following the repudiation of Celtic Christianity by the Northumbrian Church at the Synod of Whitby in 664, the Archbishop of Canterbury created several bishoprics out of Northumbrian territory with the intent that they be subordinate to Canterbury rather than to York. York resisted this development, notably by establishing a subordinate bishopric in Whithorn, which at that time was under Northumbrian rule. Specifically, Whithorn appears to have briefly been a diocese from 681 to 681 and then from c. 730. The subordination of Whithorn to York was reinforced when York was elevated to an archbishopric by Pope Gregory III in 735.

== Whithorn in the Northumbrian church ==
Whithorn within the Kingdom of Northumbria around 700 AD.

It the seventh century, the Bishopric of Hexham had been divided from the Bishopric of Lindisfarne. and the short-lived missionary Bishopric of Abercorn had been established. The seventh century creation of Whithorn briefly took the number of bishoprics in the north of Northumbria to four before returning to the eighth century pattern of Lindisfarne, Hexham and Whithorn.

== List of known Anglo-Saxon bishops of Whithorn ==
Tenure	Incumbent	Notes
731 – 735	Pehthelm	Died in office.
d. 762 x 764	Frithwald	
d. 776 x 777	Pehtwine	
bp. 777	Æthelberht of Whithorn	Was translated to the bishopric of Hexham around 789.
790 – c. 803	Beadwulf	Last known Bishop of the Northumbrian era.

Heathored is described as the successor to Beadwulf by some accounts. His inclusion on the list as a Bishop of Whithorn is not credible.

== Demise ==
In his Deeds of the Bishops of England (1125), William of Malmesbury states that the diocese failed due to incursions by the Picts and Scots.

== Surviving artefacts ==
John Godfrey holds that the Anglo-Saxon stone crosses at Aberlady and Abercorn were products of the Diocese of Whithorn.
