= Loch Slin Castle =

Coordinates: 57.8004°N 3.9376°W

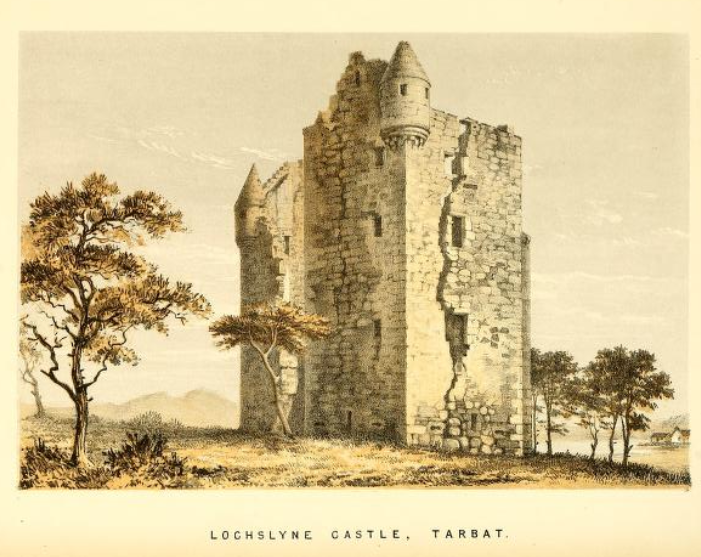
"Lochslyne Castle" (Loch Slin or Lochslin) as appears in William Fraser's The Earls of Cromartie; Their Kindred, Country, and Correspondence, Volume 1 (1876)

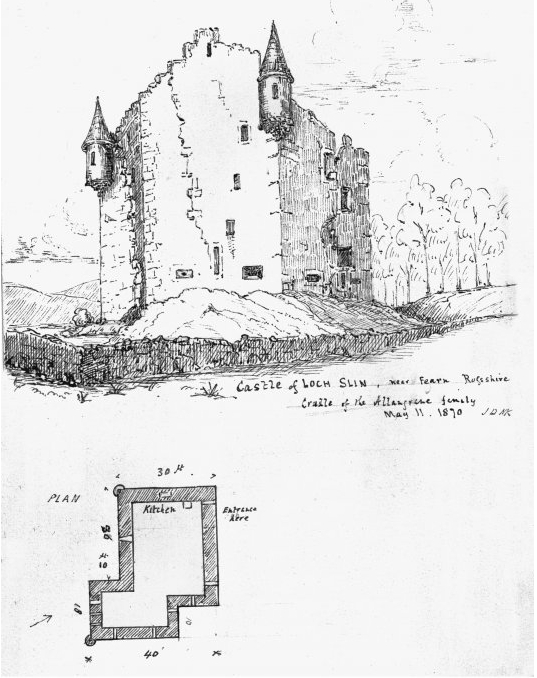
Loch Slin Castle (Lochslin) as drawn by J D Mackenzie in 1870

Loch Slin Castle (sometimes spelt Lochslin) is a ruined castle near Fearn, Highland, Scotland. From the 15th to 17th centuries it was the seat of the Vass family. The castle stood close to Loch Eye on the boundary of the parishes of Tain and Tarbat, but takes its name from an earlier name of the nearby loch.

== Architecture ==
The last upstanding part of the castle collapsed on 31 January/1 February 1953. However, old photographs clearly show that it had a high-level corbelled angle turret. It also had cable-moulded decoration comparable to that at Castlecraig. The building was an L-plan castle with the kitchen on the first floor, and seems to have been similar in layout to Castle Leod and other Mackenzie residences. Although according to Geoffrey Stell it is very doubtful that the castle was actually built by the Mackenzies who did not come into possession of it until 1624. The castle consisted of two nearly square keeps with staircases in the corners. According to the Old Statistical Account of Scotland which was written in the late 18th century, the smaller keep looking west was about 20' square, the other about 38' square. The castle was 60' high, and was fortified with three large turrets, two on the larger square and one on the smaller.

== History ==
The castle stood about half a mile east of Loch Eye. According to the New Statistical Account of Scotland the castle was 14th-century. The Vass family had been in possession of the castle from the 15th century to the early 17th century when in 1603 they were declared rebels. Their successors in the castle were the Munros of Meikle Tarrel. The castle later passed from the Munros to the Mackenzies.

== See also ==
- Castles in Scotland
