= Frithwald =

Anglo-Saxon Bishop of Whithorn

Frithwald (Old English: Friþuweald or Friðewald; d. 762 × 764) was an Anglo-Saxon Bishop of Whithorn. The version of the Anglo-Saxon Chronicle in the Worcester Chronicle says that in 735 he succeeded Pehthelm, after the latter's death, as Bishop of Whithorn. The only other source for Frithwald is the entry in versions D and E of the Anglo-Saxon Chronicle which, sub anno 762, relate that:

Frithwald, bishop at Whithorn, died on the Nones of May [May 7]. He was consecrated at Chester on the eighteenth before the Kalends of September [August 15], in the sixth winter of Ceolwulf's kingship [734/5]; and he was bishop twenty-nine winters
Friþuweald biscop æt Hwiterne forðferde on Nonas Maius, se wæs gehalgod on Ceastre on .xviii. Kalendas September þam .vi. wintra Ceolwulfes rices, 7 he wæs biscop .xxix. wintra.

If the Worcester source is correct, that would put his death in 764; the entry is also sometimes thought to cover the year 763.

== Notes ==
Religious titles
Preceded by Pehthelm	Bishop of Whithorn; 735–762 × 764	Succeeded by Pehtwine
