= Thomas Spens =

15th-century Scottish bishop

- Bishop of Aberdeen
- Church: Roman Catholic Church
- See: Diocese of Aberdeen
- In office: 1457–1480
- Predecessor: Ingram Lindsay
- Successor: William Forbes
- Previous posts: Bishop of Galloway (1450–1458); Archdeacon of Moray; Archdeacon of Galloway

Orders
- Consecration: November 1399

Personal details
- Born: 1415 Glen Douglas
- Died: 15 April 1480 Edinburgh

Thomas Spens [de Spens] (c. 1415–15 April 1480) was Scottish statesman and prelate. The son of John Spens of Glendouglas, he received his education at Edinburgh before becoming a royal servant and councilor under James II and James III.

== Biography ==
By his exceptional abilities, he attracted the notice the Scottish king, James II, who sent him on errands to England and to France, where he negotiated several treaties. About 1450 he became bishop of Galloway; soon afterwards he was made Keeper of the Privy Seal of Scotland, and in 1459 he was chosen bishop of Aberdeen.

Much of his time, however, was passed in journeys to France and to England, and in 1464 he and Alexander Stewart, duke of Albany, a son of James II, were captured at sea by some English sailors. Edward IV, to whom the bishop had previously revealed an assassination plot, set him at liberty, and he was perhaps partly responsible for the treaty of peace made about this time between the English king and James III.

He also helped to bring about the meeting between Edward IV and Louis XI of France at Picquigny, and another treaty of peace between England and Scotland in 1474. Spens was a frequent attender at the Scottish parliaments, and contributed very generously to the decoration of his cathedral at Aberdeen. In 1479 Spens founded a hospital dedicated to Mary at the foot of Leith Wynd in Edinburgh, catering for up to 12 poor men. A chapel later attached and dedicated to St Paul brought about the name of Paul's Hospital.

He died in Edinburgh on 15 April 1480 and was buried in the north aisle of Trinity College Kirk close to the hospital which he founded.

In 1582 Edinburgh council forbade "papists" from operating Paul's Hospital and in 1619 had the building rebuilt under the new name of "Paul's Work" which had a function both as hospice and as college. Five Dutchmen were brought to teach production of "coarse woollen stuffs" but this was not a success and around 1621 the building became a house of correction.

Political offices
Preceded by William Turnbull; Bishop of Glasgow	Keeper of the Privy Seal of Scotland; 1458–1459	Succeeded by John Arouse
Preceded by James Lindsay; Provost of Lincluden	Keeper of the Privy Seal of Scotland; 1467–1470	Succeeded by William Tulloch; Bishop of Orkney
Catholic Church titles
Preceded by Robert de Tulloch	Archdeacon of Moray; 1444–1447 x 1448	Succeeded by Patrick Fraser
Preceded by Not known Last known archdeacon: John Benyng	Archdeacon of Galloway x 1450	Succeeded by Not known Next known archdeacon: John Otterburn
Preceded by Alexander Vaus	Bishop of Galloway; 1450–1458	Succeeded by Thomas Vaus
Preceded by Ingram Lindsay	Bishop of Aberdeen; 1457–1480	Succeeded by Robert Blackadder
