= Vass =

Vass or VASS can refer to:

== People ==
- Ádám Vass, Hungarian footballer currently playing for Brescia Calcio
- Baillie Vass, a nickname given to Alec Douglas-Home by Private Eye magazine
- Ghizela Vass, Romanian communist activist and politician
- Joan Vass (1925-2011), American fashion designer.
- Márta Vass, Hungarian long-distance runner

== Other uses ==
- VASS (cardmakers), Vereinigte Altenburger und Stralsunder Spielkarten-Fabriken, German cardmakers, now ASS Altenburger
- Vass, North Carolina, a town
- Vass of Lochslin, Scottish family
- Vector addition system with states, a mathematical modeling language
- Volleyball All-Star Showcase, an all-star exhibition event in the Philippines
