= George Vaus =

Scottish prelate

George Vaus (died 1508) was a Scottish prelate of the late 15th and early 16th century.

== Career ==
Possessing a master's degree, he became a parson of Wigtown, and on 9 December 1482, he was provided the bishopric of Galloway. He was consecrated by 9 October 1483, when he appeared before the lords auditors on behalf of his nephew, Patrick Vaus, the future Prior of Whithorn, for whom George was tutor. Patrick was involved in a suit concerning certain lands, against Sir William Stewart of Dalswinton and his wife, Euphame, who was Patrick's grandmother. The suit ended in Patrick's favour. On 13 March 1503/4, George Vaus was one of the bishops in Parliament. In 1504, he became Dean of the Chapel Royal at Stirling, a position which King James IV of Scotland had recently decided to attach permanently to the bishops of Galloway.

== Death and Burial ==
The date of Bishop Vaus' death is not known precisely, but two circumstances provide a range: (a) he was alive on 25 October 1507, and (b) James IV attended a mass for the soul of the bishop on 30 January 1508. Nor is the site of his burial is unknown, but historian Richard Oram has suggested he may have been interred at Whithorn Priory, where he oversaw extensive renovations, and, indeed, on the left side of the priory's doorway, there is a carved angel bearing the bishop's arms.

== Reputation ==
Bishop George Vaus has been characterized as "a very worldly man who fits easily into the rather distorted stereotype of the late medieval, pre-Reformation cleric." He had two illegitimate children: a son Abraham, who was gifted by his father with the lands of Portincalzie in the Rhins of Galloway; and a daughter Margaret, who married Patrick Dunbar of Clugston. He was, moreover, a frequent practicer of nepotism.

== Sources ==
- Donaldson, Gordon, "The Bishops and Priors of Whithorn", in Dumfriesshire and Galloway Natural History & Antiquarians Society: Transactions and Journal of Proceedings, Third Series, vol. 27 (1950), pp. 127–54
- Dowden, John, The Bishops of Scotland, ed. J. Maitland Thomson, (Glasgow, 1912)
- Watt, D. E. R., Fasti Ecclesiae Scotinanae Medii Aevi ad annum 1638, 2nd Draft, (St Andrews, 1969)

Religious titles
| Preceded by Ninian Spot | Bishop of Galloway; 1482–1508 | Succeeded by James Beaton |
| Preceded by James Allardice | Dean of the Chapel Royal; 1504–1508 | Succeeded by James Beaton |
