= Archdeacon of Galloway =

The Archdeacon of Galloway was the only archdeacon in the medieval Diocese of Galloway (Whithorn), acting as a deputy of the Bishop of Galloway. The following is a list of archdeacons:

== List of archdeacons of Galloway ==
- Robert, fl. 1154 x 1186
- John, fl. 1186 x 1222
- Michael, fl. 1235 x 1253
- Geoffrey, 1254–1294
- John Nepos, 1294–1294
- Gilbert de Galloway (Galwidia), fl. 1320 x 1321
- Patrick Macdowell, x 1331–1360
- Stephen de Makerstoun (Malcarston), fl. x 1367.
- Duncan Petit, fl. 1363
- Richard Smerles fl. x 1391.
- Thomas de Buittle, 1391 - 1415.
- Gilbert Cavan, 1415-1415 x 1417.
- John Gray, 1415 x 1417–1425
- Patrick Young, 1423–1471
  - David de Hamilton, 1425
  - John Betoun, 1427–1428
  - John Benyng, 1430
  - Thomas Spens, x 1450
- John Otterburn, 1471–1478
- George Brown, 1477–1478
- Andrew Stewart, 1502–1507
- Walter Betoun, 1507
- Thomas Nudry, 1509-1510 x 1512.
- Alexander Shaw, 1512–1513
- Henry Wemyss, 1513 x 1522–1531
- Patrick Arnot, 1529–1543
  - Thomas Hay, 1531
- Lyon Brown, 1576–1577
- James Adamson, 1614–1637

== See also ==
- Bishop of Galloway
