= Corseyard Farm =

Architecturally unusual dairy farm in Scotland

- The Coo Palace
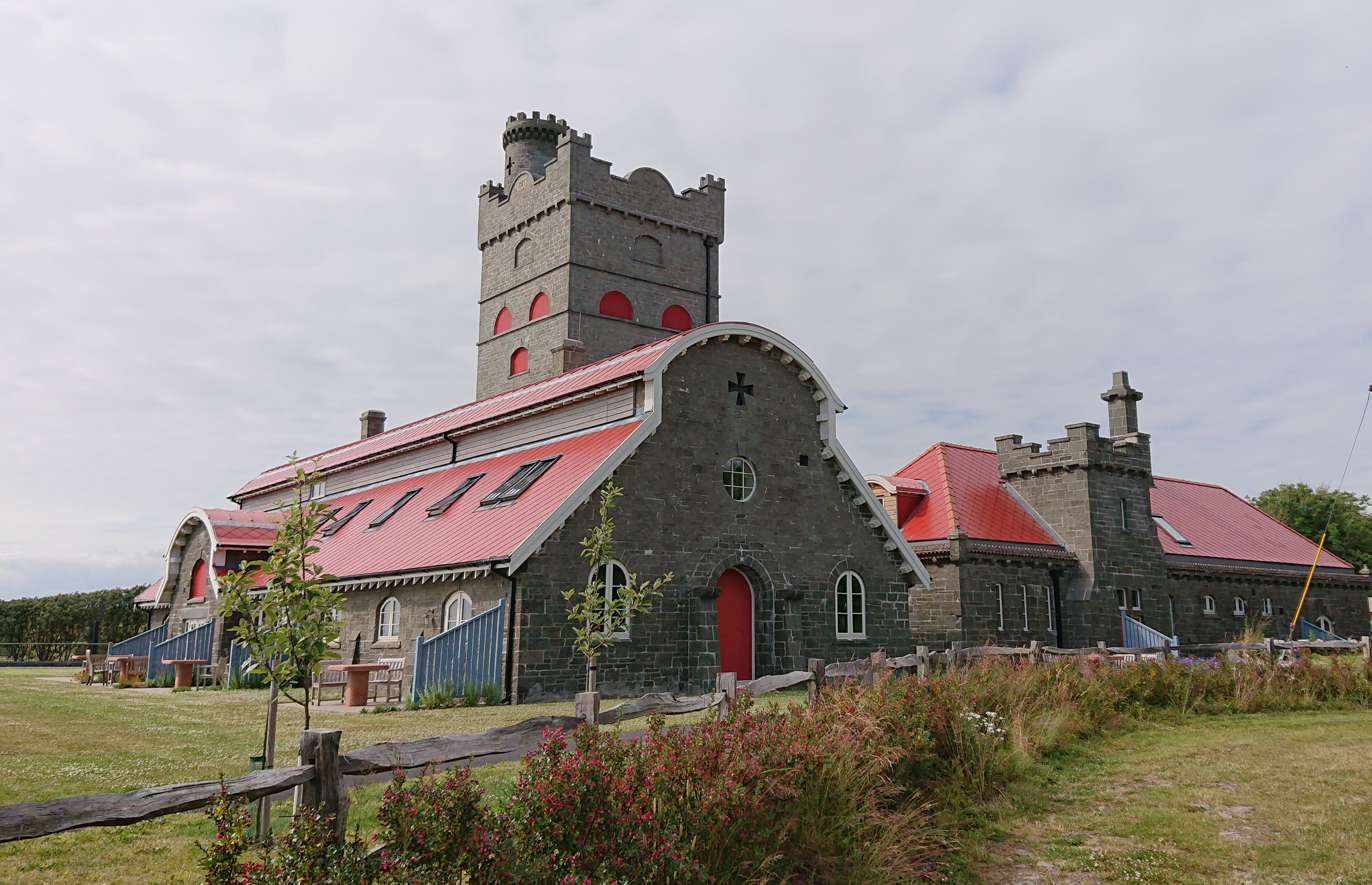
- The view from the south east
- Interactive map of the Corseyard Farm area

General information
- Type: Dairy farm, converted into holiday accommodation
- Architectural style: Gothic Revival
- Classification: Category A listed building
- Location: Near Kirkandrews, Dumfries and Galloway, Scotland
- Coordinates: 54°48′44″N 4°11′39″W
- Construction started: 1911
- Completed: 1914
- Renovated: 2020
- Owner: Holiday Property Bond

Design and construction
- Architect: G M Higginbottom
- Designations: Category A listed building

Renovating team
- Architect: JMP Architects

Website
- www.hpb.co.uk/property-portfolio/coo-palace/details

Corseyard Farm, known locally as the Coo Palace and now marketed under that name, is an architecturally unusual dairy farm near Kirkandrews in Scotland, built between 1911 and 1914 and since converted into holiday accommodation. Erected for the Manchester businessman James Brown as part of a series of flamboyant improvements to the Knockbrex Estate, which he had bought in 1894, it was designed in the Gothic Revival style to resemble a fortified castle with battlemented roofs, arrowslit windows and arched entrances.

The buildings were designated a Category A listed building in 1981, by which time they were already in a dilapidated condition. A number of schemes were proposed to rescue and repurpose the buildings between 1990 and 2010, and in 2017 consent was given for it to be converted into holiday accommodation by the Holiday Property Bond. Work was carried out on the site between 2018 and 2020, and it opened to receive its first holidaymakers in 2020.

== Description ==
Corseyard Farm is a collection of dairy farm buildings about 1 kilometre (0.6 mi) west of Kirkandrews in Kirkcudbrightshire. Designed in a distinctive and flamboyant manner, primarily in the Gothic Revival style and incorporating elements of Arts and Crafts and Art Nouveau design, it was converted into holiday accommodation between 2018 and 2020. The principal buildings are laid out around a square courtyard. On the south side of the courtyard is the main block, which was originally a milking parlour. It is buttressed, and accessed by round arched entrances at either end, and its walls are pierced by large cruciform mock-arrowslit windows. On the north side of this is a tall battlemented tower, surmounted by a turret; originally this was built as a water tower, but it did not work properly and was soon disused. The "heavy detailing" of these buildings is described by architectural historian John Gifford as imparting a "nightmarish quality".

On the east side of the courtyard was a stable block, which incorporates a smaller tower, again battlemented. The north and west sides of the courtyard were the barn and cart shed, which are less elaborately decorated. The southern boundary wall is decorated by the insetting of pebbles taken from the nearby coastline, and is accessed by a gabled gateway with ball finials. In the west corner of the enclosure is a small battlemented tower, which housed a weighbridge and was also used as a tool shed.

== History ==
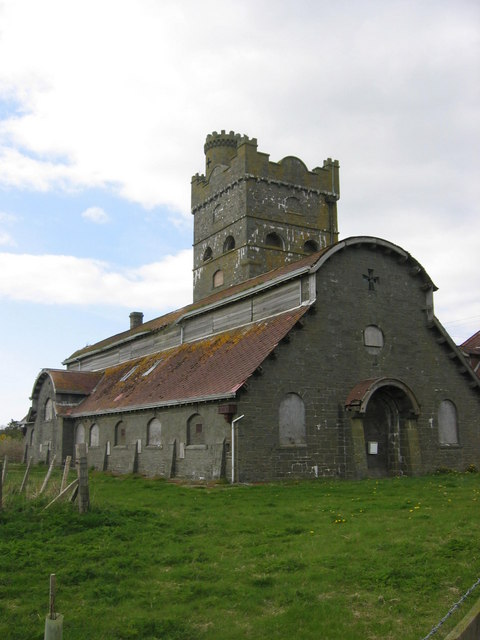
The Coo Palace in 2006, prior to its renovation.

In 1894 James Brown, a successful draper from Manchester who had been made rich by the department store he helped establish, Affleck & Brown, purchased and retired to the estate of Knockbrex. He set about a programme of building on the estate, renovating existing structures and constructing new ones, all in a distinctive and unusual style. He often employed the Manchester architect G H Higginbottom, who is thought to have designed Corseyard Farm. Construction started in 1911, it was completed in 1914 and became home to a herd of 12 cows. Its elaborate design, which was most unusual for a utilitarian building, inspired people to refer to it as the Coo Palace (Scots language for Cow Palace), which is still how it is generally known in the local area.

In 1981, Corseyard Farm was designated a Category A listed building, but it was already in a state of disrepair and it needed remedial work in 1988 to make it wind and water tight. At the same time, discussions were held between its owners and Historic Scotland (now Historic Environment Scotland) about an application for planning consent to convert the building into holiday accommodation.

By 1994, the building had deteriorated further: part of the roof and several doors were missing, and birds were roosting inside. In 1995, it was sold to a developer who planned to restore it for mixed use, as a residence and film studio, for which listing building consent was given in 1998, but the plans for the development were called in for review by Historic Scotland later in 1998 due to concerns about how the designs would change the external appearance of the building. Deterioration of the fabric continued, and by 2010 there were concerns about the buildings' survival.

In 2014, Holiday Property Bond purchased Corseyard Farm, and had architectural firm JMP Architects of Lancashire draw up plans to convert the buildings into holiday accommodation. In 2017 Historic Environment Scotland gave the plan their backing, and advised Dumfries and Galloway Council to approve the scheme, which they did in November of that year. By 2018 building work was underway, and in 2020 the site was opened, marketed as The Coo Palace.

== Sources ==
- "Kirkandrews Church Kirkandrews Dumfries and Galloway". Architects of Greater Manchester. The Manchester Group of the Victorian Society.
- "Kirkcudbrightshire's 'Coo Palace' conversion approval advised". BBC News. BBC.
- "Conversion of 'Coo Palace' near Borgue approved". BBC News. BBC.
- "Corseyard Farm and Model Dairy". Buildings at Risk Register. Historic Environment Scotland.
- "Coo". Dictionary of the Scots Language.
- Gifford, John (1996). The Buildings of Scotland:Dumfries and Galloway. London: Penguin. ISBN 0140-71067-1.
- Gordon, Haig (2008). The Kirkcudbrightshire Companion. Kirkcudbright: Galloway Publishing. ISBN 978-0-9553183-3-7.
- "Corseyard Farm". Canmore. Historic Environment Scotland.
- Historic Environment Scotland. "Corseyard Farm including boundary walls, tool shed and weighbridge (Category A Listed Building LB3381)".
- "Coo Palace". Holiday Property Bond.
- Tyeson, Tamsin. "Kirkcudbrightshire 'coo palace' to be preserved". The Scotsman. JPIMedia Publishing Ltd.
