= Thomas MacDowell =

Roman Catholic bishop, died 1363

Thomas MacDowell (Scottish Gaelic: Tòmas MacDhùghaill) was Bishop of Galloway (1359–1363). He had previously been rector of the parish of “Kyrteum” (perhaps Kirkcolm?), and so was certainly a native of Galloway as his Gaelic name further suggests. He was provided to the see by Pope Innocent VI sometime before December 1359. He was consecrated at Avignon by Cardinal Peter, Bishop of Ostia.

He appeared in the records for the last time in a document dating to September 1362, along with the Bishop of Dunkeld and the Bishop of Brechin as an arbitrator in a dispute between the chapter of Glasgow and its bishop. His successor Adam de Lanark was provided to the see in November 1363, so it is probable that Thomas died sometime in the early part of 1363.

Religious titles
Preceded by Michael MacKenlagh	Bishop of Galloway; 1359–1363	Succeeded by Adam de Lanark
