= Thomas Vaus =

Scottish royal official and cleric

Thomas Vaus (also de Vaus, Vause) was a 15th-century Scottish royal official and cleric. He was a graduate of the University of Paris, being admitted there as a Bachelor ad eundem in 1445, graduating as a Licentiate in 1447. At some stage he completed an M.A., and bore the title of "Master". His brother Martin Vaus, later Dean of Ross, was at Paris with him. He became Keeper of the Privy Seal of Scotland and secretary of King James II of Scotland.

On 8 May 1456, he was provided to succeed James Inglis as Dean of Glasgow Cathedral. In the following year, Vaus was provided to bishopric of Galloway, vacant on the expected translation of Thomas Spens to the bishopric of Aberdeen on 21 November 1457. Unfortunately for Vaus, Spens' translation to Aberdeen was not effective, and while Spens was indeed successfully translated to Aberdeen in the following year, it was Ninian Spot, not Vaus, who on 15 December 1458 got the new provision to Galloway. The reasons for this change are not clear, but Thomas never became a consecrated Bishop of Galloway nor did he ever attain another bishopric.

In 1468, he exchanged the deanery of Glasgow with James Lindsay to become Precentor of Elgin Cathedral ("Precentor of Moray"). He was Dean of Fortrose Cathedral ("Dean of Ross") following the death of the previous dean David Ogilvie; this occurred perhaps as early as 18 May 1457, that is if Vaus is the same as the "Thomas Ross" provided in that year; he was certainly provided to the deanery by 21 October 1458,. This provision involved him in litigation with one David Balfour, who was said to have been in possession of the deanery on 25 June 1463. Thomas in turn was said to have been in possession of the deanery on 27 September 1466; but sometime between the last date and 14 May 1468 Thomas resigned it to the Bishop of Aberdeen, who in turn collated Thomas' brother Martin to the deanery.

Thomas Vaus resigned, sometime between 4 August 1478 and 8 June 1480, the precentorship of Moray to his relative Alexander Vaus, not to be confused with Alexander Vaus the bishop. Little is heard of Thomas after this.

== Notes ==
Religious titles
Preceded by James Inglis	Dean of Glasgow; 1456–1468	Succeeded by James Lindsay
Preceded by Thomas Spens	Bishop of Galloway unsuccessful provision 1457	Succeeded by Ninian Spot
Preceded by David Ogilvie; Thomas Ross?	Dean of Ross; 1457 × 1458-1466 × 1468 opposed by: David Balfour, 1458-1463; Alexander de Lumsden, 1466	Succeeded by Martin Vaus
Preceded by James Lindsay	Precentor of Moray; 1468–1478 × 1480 opposed by: James Inglis, 1468-1471 × 1474	Succeeded by Alexander Vaus (not bishop Alexander Vaus)
