= Cruggleton Castle =

Castle in Scotland

- Cruggleton, Wigtownshire, Dumfries and Galloway, Scotland; UK grid reference NX483428
- The castle in 2016

Site information
- Type: Castle
- Owner: Private
- Open to the public: Yes
- Condition: Ruined

Location
- Shown within Scotland
- Location within Scotland
- Coordinates: 54.757167°N 4.357333°W

Site history
- Built: 13th Century
- Materials: Stone

Cruggleton Castle is a multi-period archaeological site on the coast of the Machars, in the historical county of Wigtownshire in south-west Scotland. It is located at Cruggleton Point, around 4.5 kilometres (2.8 mi) east of Whithorn and 6 kilometres (3.7 mi) south-east of Sorbie. Excavations in the 1970s and 1980s revealed several periods of use, from the 1st century AD to the 17th century. The first stone tower was built in the 13th century, on an earlier motte.

The castle is located on a high outcrop of shale, which forms a promontory on the east-facing cliff edge, about 40 metres (130 ft) above sea level. The name "Cruggleton" is taken to derive from the rocky nature of the site.

== History of the site ==
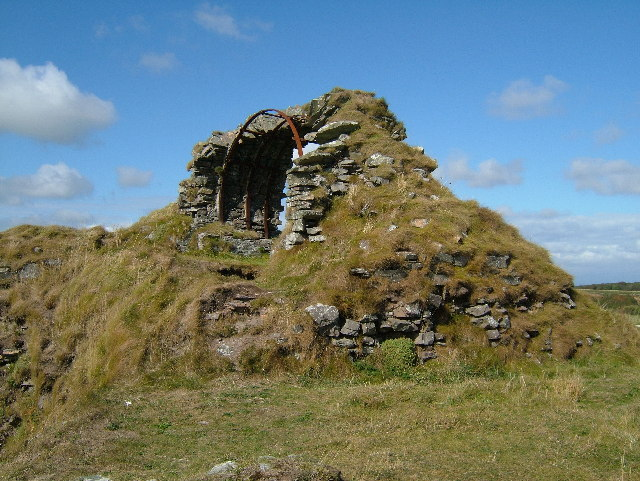
Cruggleton Castle in 2005 showing metal support arches

Excavations on the site revealed the remains of a late Iron Age hut circle, and of a timber hall dated to the early medieval period. During the 12th or 13th century, the rock outcrop was raised to form a motte and a timber tower was built. During this time, Cruggleton Castle was possibly a seat of the Lords of Galloway, passing to the Earls of Buchan. The earliest stone tower and curtain wall was built between the late 13th and early 15th centuries. In the 1290s, John Comyn, Earl of Buchan, had a licence from Edward I to dig for lead in the Calf of Man, to cover eight towers of the castle. Cruggleton, also known as "The Black Rock of Cree", has been associated with the stronghold on the Water of Cree that William Wallace captured, with his companions Stephen of Ireland and Kerlé, according to Blind Harry. It was again taken by Scottish forces in 1307 and subsequently demolished. Later in the 14th century, King David II granted Cruggleton to Gilbert Kennedy. In 1424, it was granted to the Prior and Canons of Whithorn.

In 1563, the spies of Queen Elizabeth I of England visited south-west Scotland to examine the defences at Cruggleton, Wigtown, Cardoness and Kirkcudbright. They noted that Cruggleton "is now kept but with 2 men only but when the Prior of Whithorn lies there then under 20 men without artillery." They also made a coloured drawing of the castle, now held by the British Museum, that shows a high tower, surrounded by a curtain wall with sloped merlons and defended by drawbridge and portcullis.

After the Reformation, church lands were distributed among the nobles of Scotland. A dispute arose over Cruggleton Castle between Lord Robert Stewart, Commendator of Whithorn Priory, and John Fleming, 5th Lord Fleming, which was heard by the civil courts. Despite this in 1569 Stewart, an illegitimate son of James V, was besieged in the castle by Lord Fleming. James Stewart, 1st Earl of Moray, also an illegitimate son of James V, interceded on his brother's behalf by writing to Sir Patrick Vaus of Barnbarroch, urging him to relieve the siege. The dispute was resolved in favour of Margaret Stewart, Mistress of Ochiltree, in the 1580s.

Cruggleton was later held by Sir Patrick Vaus, who died in 1598. It passed to his son Sir John Vaus who disposed of the property to Peter McDowall of Machermore, who in turn sold it to James Kennedy in 1606. The castle passed through various owners during the following decades, but by 1684 it was described as "wholly demolished and ruinous."

== Cruggleton ruins ==
Cruggleton Castle is accessible along a coastal path from the grounds of nearby Galloway House. Today the outward remains consist of a narrow section of barrel vaulting in what was the tower. It is known locally as 'The Arch' and is clearly visible from the B7063 Garlieston to Isle of Whithorn road. Formerly supported on metal bands, the stonework has recently been rebuilt (how recently?) and stands around 3 metres (9.8 ft) high. The foundations of several further buildings can be seen across the site. The outline of the motte is still clearly visible, measuring around 31 by 29 metres (102 by 95 ft), as is a broad ditch across the promontory, about 50 metres (160 ft) west of the ruins. The remains are a scheduled monument.

== Cruggleton Church ==
Cruggleton Church is about 750 metres (2,460 ft) west of the castle and may indicate the approximate site of the village of Cruggleton. It was established in the early 12th century by Fergus, Lord of Galloway, and remains the most complete Romanesque church in the area. The church was restored from a ruined condition in the 1890s by William de B M Galloway for the 3rd Marquess of Bute. The church is a category A listed building. An ecumenical service is held in the church every September.

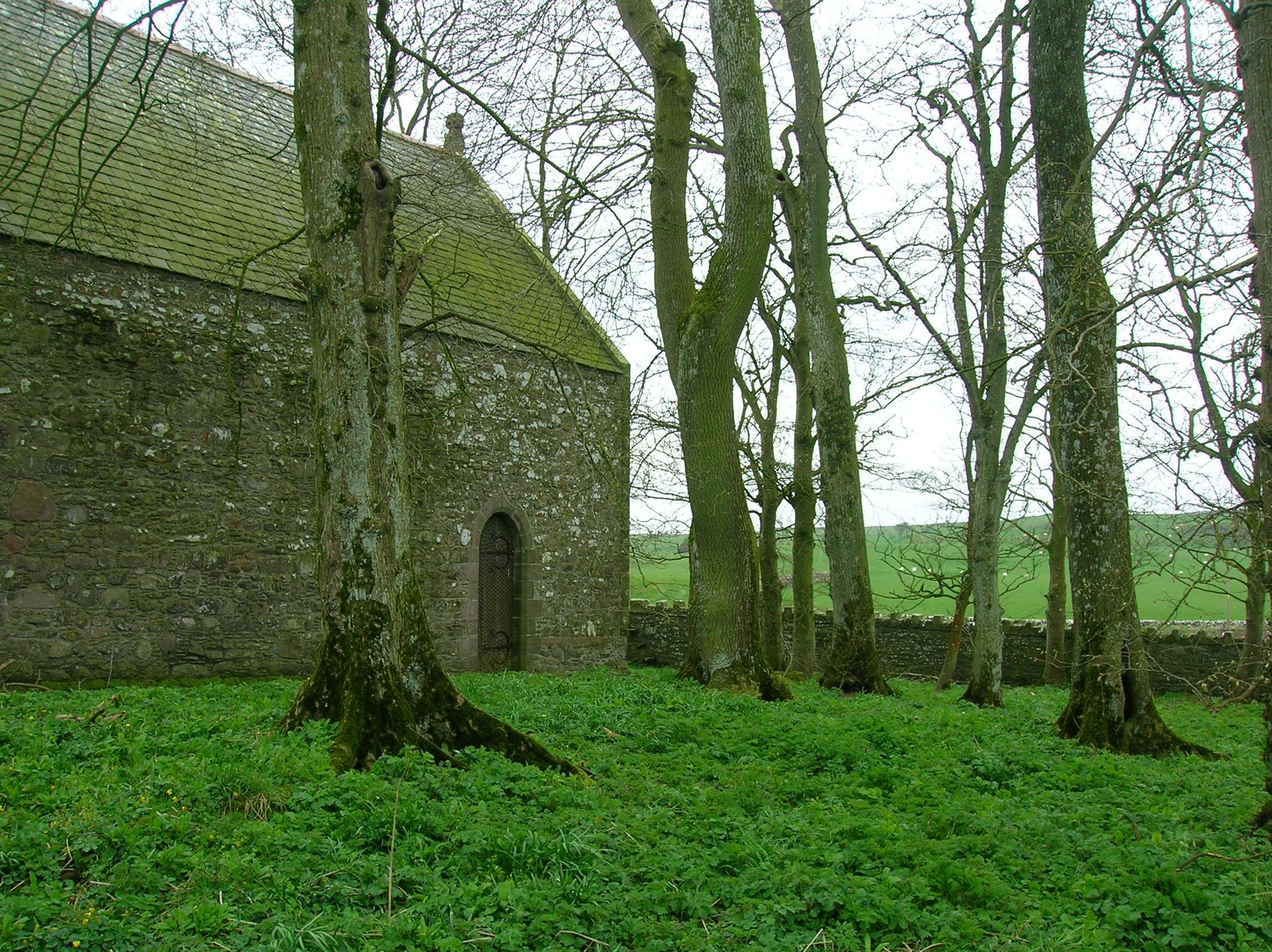
Cruggleton Church south side.

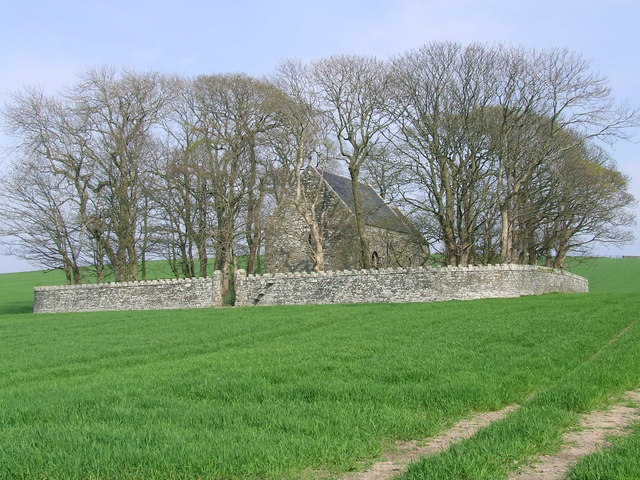
Cruggleton Church.

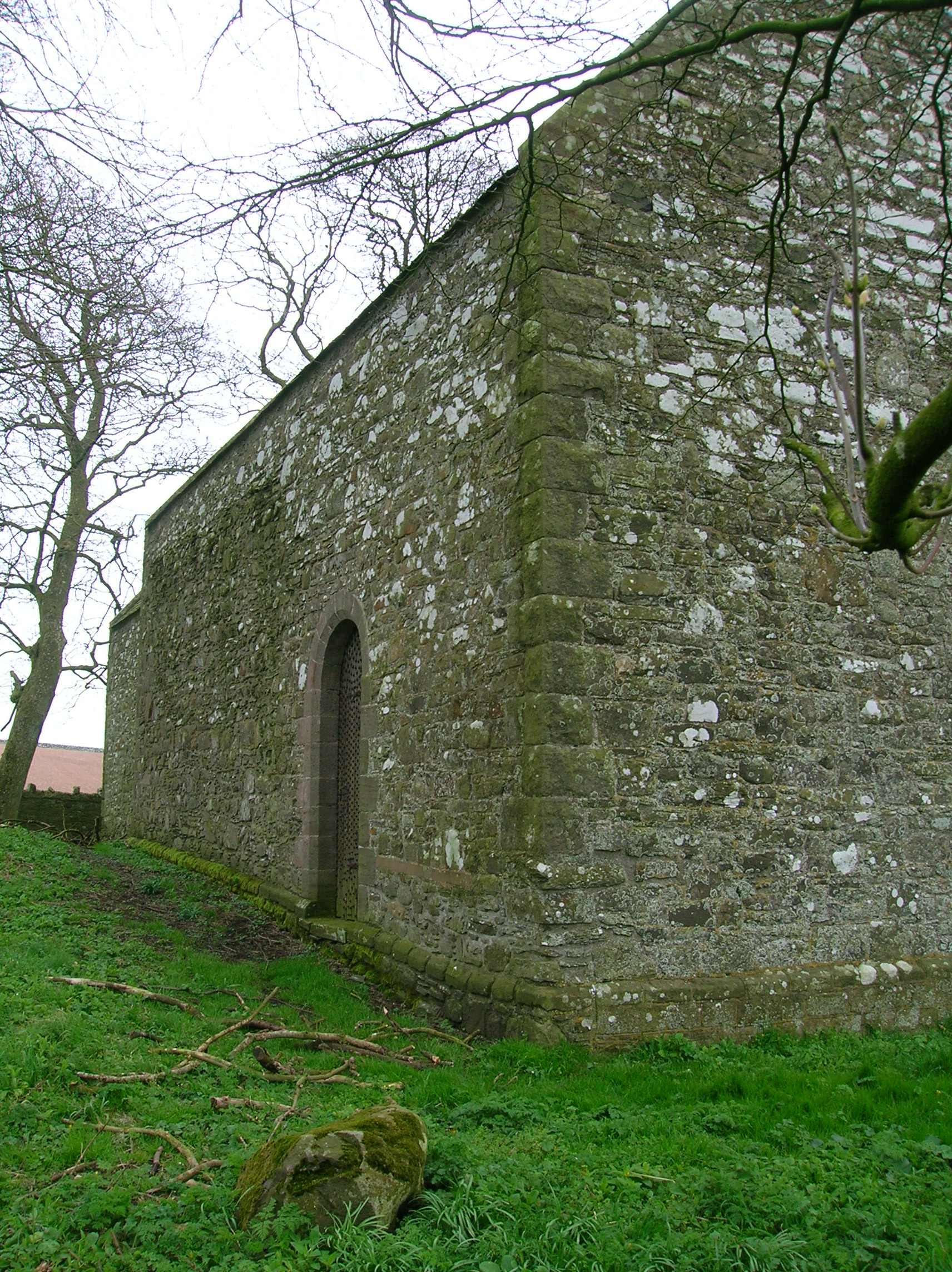
Cruggleton Church, north-facing side.

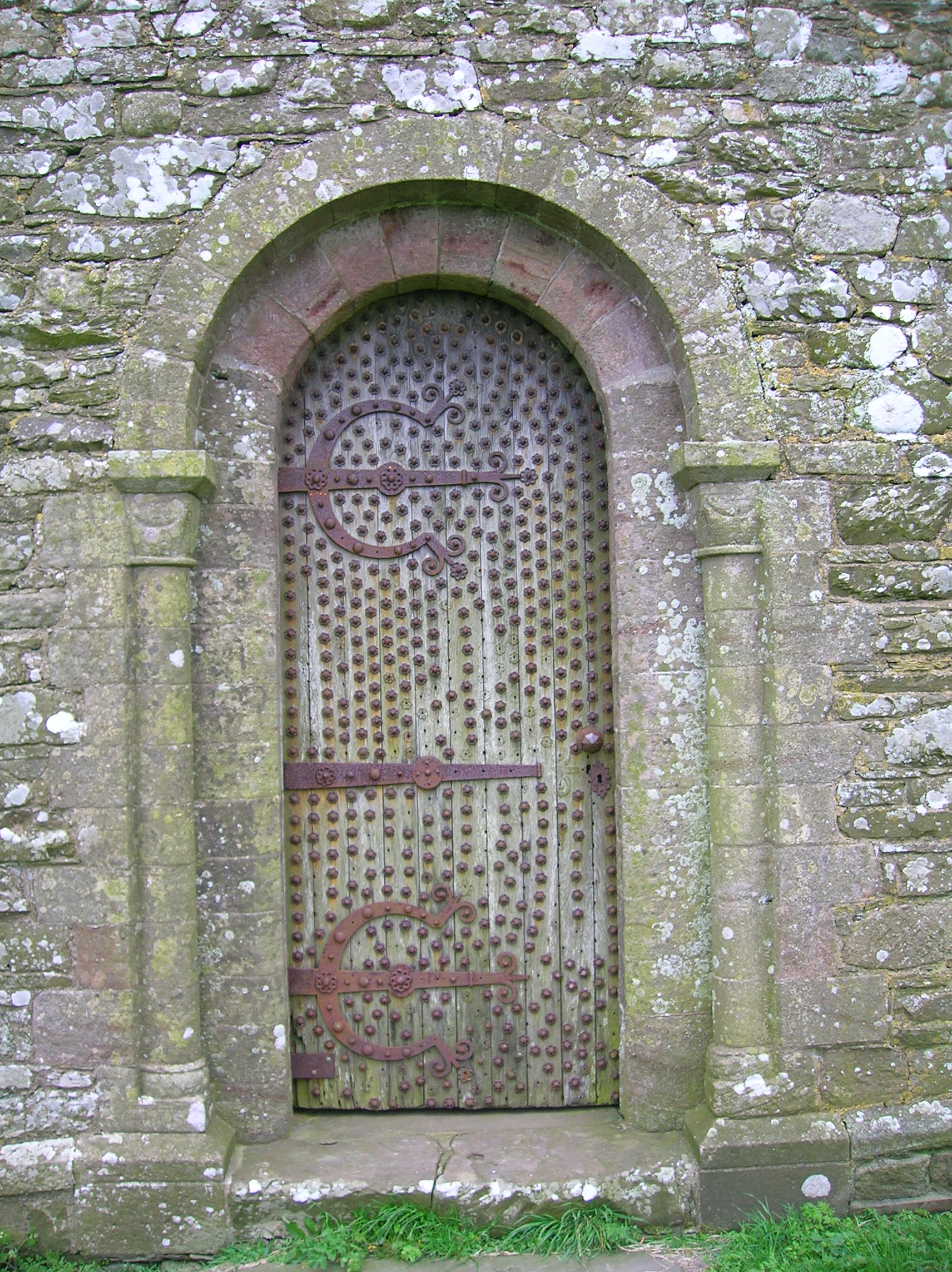
Cruggleton Church door.
