= Diocese of Galloway =

Coordinates: 55.069°N 3.608°W

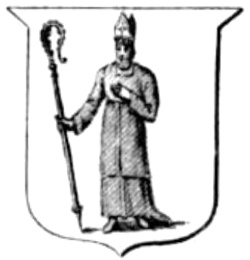
- Head: Bishop of Galloway
- Archdeacon(s): Archdeacon of Galloway
- Known rural deans: Desnes, Farines, Rhinns
- First attestation: 9 December 1128
- Metropolitan before 1472: Archbishop of York
- Metropolitan after 1492: Archbishop of Glasgow
- Cathedral: Whithorn Priory
- Dedication: Martin of Tours
- Native dedication: Ninian (Uinniau, Finnian)
- Canons: Premonstratensian canons
- Mensal churches: Girthon; Inch; Kirkinner; Rhinns.
- Common churches: Borgue; Clayshant; Cruggleton; Gelston; Glasserton; Great Sorbie; Kilcolmkill; Kirkandrews; Kirkdale; Kirkinner; Kirkmaiden; Kirkmichael; Little Sorbie; Longcastle; Mochrum; Toskerton; Whithorn; Wigtown.
- Prebendal churches: Kells; Penninghame.
- Catholic successor: Resurrected: 1876
- Episcopal successor: Diocese of Glasgow and Galloway

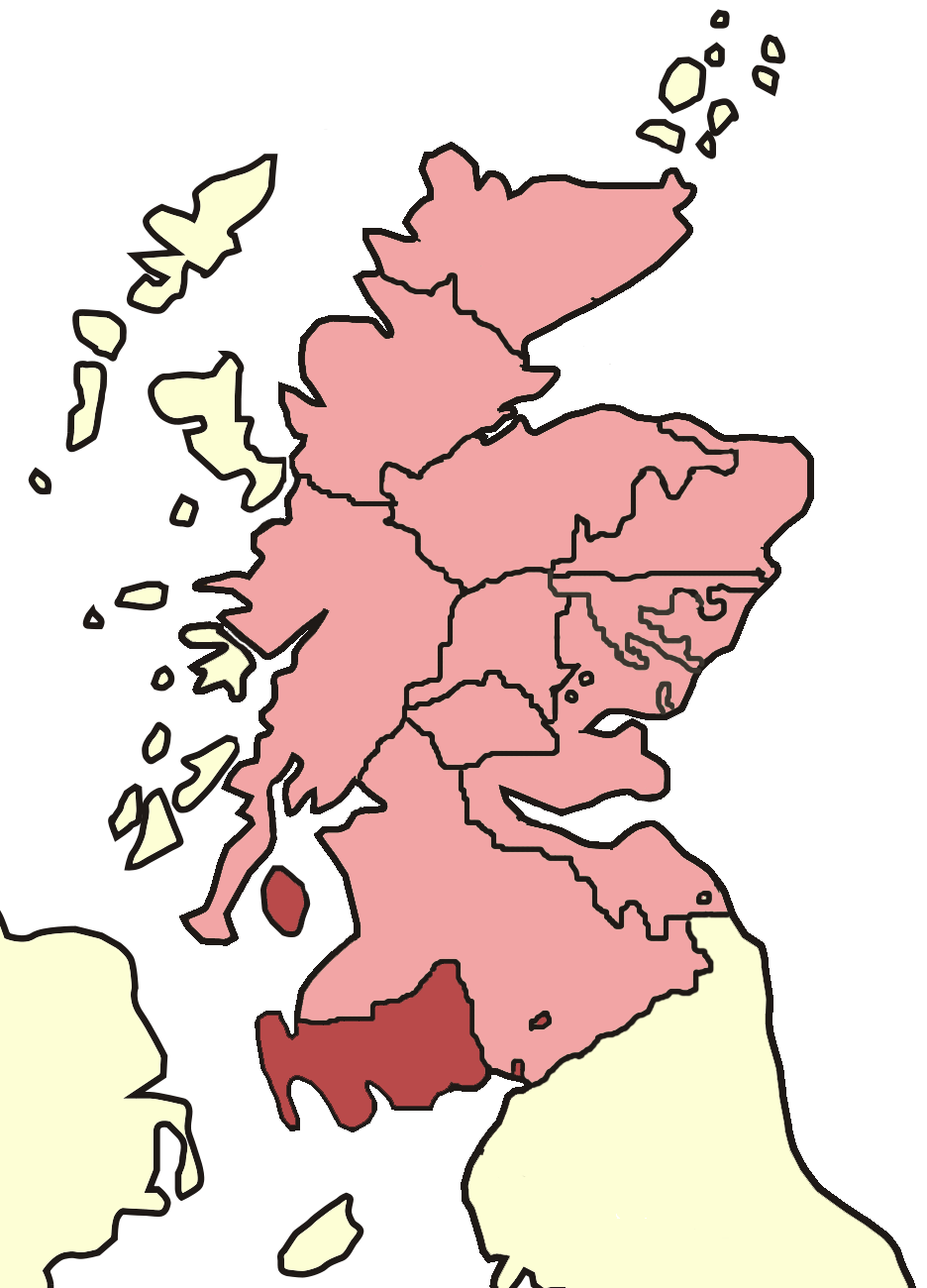
Skene's map of Scottish bishoprics in the reign of David I (reigned 1124–1153).

The Diocese of Galloway was one of the thirteen (after 1633 fourteen) dioceses of the pre-1689 Scottish Church. The Diocese was led by the Bishop of Galloway and was centred on Whithorn Cathedral.

In the Middle Ages, there was only one archdeacon, the Archdeacon of Galloway. There are three known deaneries, the deaneries of Desnes (Kirkcudbright), Farines (Wigtown) and Rhinns. The deaneries of Farines and Rhinns had been combined by the 16th century.

== List of bishops ==
- See Bishop of Galloway

== List of archdeacons ==
- See Archdeacon of Galloway

== List of cathedral priors ==
- See Prior of Whithorn

== List of known rural deans ==
=== Early known rural deans ===
- Mac Bethad or Máel Bethad, fl. 1165 x 1174
- James, 1185 x 1197

=== List of known deans of Desnes ===
- Matthew, 1200 x 1209-1209 x 1222
- Thomas, fl. 1250
- John Wallace, fl. 1331
- Herbert Dunn, fl. 1529.

=== List of known deans of Farines ===
- William, fl. 1200 x 1209
- S.[...], fl. 1254-1257

=== List of known deans of Rhinns ===
- Gilbert, fl. 1200 x 1209

=== List of known deans of Farines and Rhinns ===
- John MacCraken, fl. 1538-1552
- Michael Hawthorn, fl. 1559

== List of civil parishes ==
1. Anwoth
2. Balmaclellan
3. Balmaghie
4. Balnacross
5. Borgue
6. Buittle
7. Clayshant
8. Colmonell
9. Colvend
10. Crossmichael
11. Cruggleton
12. Dalry
13. Dunrod
14. Galtway
15. Gelston
16. Girthon
17. Glasserton
18. Glenluce
19. Inch
20. Kells
21. Kelton
22. Kirkandrews
23. Kirkbean
24. Kirkbride a.k.a. Blaiket
25. Kirkchrist
26. Kirkcolm
27. Kirkcormack
28. Kirkcowan
29. Kirkcudbright
30. Kirkdale
31. Kirkgunzeon
32. Kirkinner
33. Kirkmabreck
34. Kirkmadrine
35. Kirkmaiden
36. Kirkpatrick Durham
37. Kirkpatrick Irongray
38. Leswalt
39. Lochrutton
40. Longcastle
41. Minigaff
42. Mochrum
43. New Abbey a.k.a. Kinderloch
44. Parton
45. Penninghame
46. Portpatrick
47. Rerrick
48. Senwick
49. Sorbie
50. Soulseat
51. Southwick
52. Stoneykirk
53. Terregles
54. Tongland
55. Toskerton
56. Troqueer
57. Twynholm
58. Urr
59. Whithorn (Cathedral)
60. Wigtown

== Bibliography ==
- Watt, D.E.R., Fasti Ecclesiae Scoticanae Medii Aevi ad annum 1638, 2nd Draft, (St Andrews, 1969), pp. 138–9
