= Candida Casa =

Church ruin in Dumfries and Galloway, Scotland

Coordinates: 54.733391°N 4.417136°W

Candida Casa was the name given to the church established by St Ninian in Whithorn, Galloway, southern Scotland, in the mid fifth century AD. The name derives from Latin: casa (meaning hut) and candidus/candida (meaning shining or glittering white), referring possibly to the stone used to construct it, or the whitewash used to paint it.

== History ==
Whithorn, an early trading centre, precedes the island of Iona by 150 years as a birthplace of Scottish Christianity. In 397, St Ninian established the first Christian mission north of Hadrian's Wall there, while the Roman legions still occupied Britain. He erected a small stone church known as the "Candida Casa", or White House, which was Scotland's first Christian building. The church site quickly grew to prominence in the early medieval period, becoming a cathedral and monastery, and remaining a centre for pilgrimage despite the unstable political situation in the region.

At Whithorn, many monks were trained who later went into the missionary field to become famous apostles of Ireland and Alba, even as far north as the Orkney and Shetland islands. Saint Éogan, founder of the monastery of Ardstraw, was an Irishman who lived in the 6th century and was said to have been taken by pirates to Britain. On obtaining his freedom, he went to study at Candida Casa. Bishop Healy identifies the site with the great seminary of Rosnat, "...and undoubtedly was one of the chief sources from which Irish monasticism was derived."

Pottery and glass from the Mediterranean and Western France reached this early Christian monastery and many of the monks may have come from France itself, bringing new technology and crafts with them.

Whithorn and the surrounding area passed from Brythonic control to the Northumbrians. An Anglo-Saxon Diocese of Whithorn was established no later than c. 730. Later the area fell under Norse control before finally returning to Celtic control by 1100, by which time the area was part of the Kingdom of Scots. The bishopric of Whithorn was re-established in 1128, and a new cathedral and adjoining priory were built on the site.

The site fell into disrepair throughout the Scottish Reformation and beyond. Whithorn Priory and Museum encompasses the ruins and is maintained by Historic Environment Scotland. Adjoining this is St Ninians's Priory, built in 1822 as the Church of Scotland parish in Whithorn and still in use as of 2017.
