= Expectative =

In the canon law of the Roman Catholic Church, an expectative, or an expectative grace (from the Latin expectare, to expect or wait for), is the anticipatory grant of an ecclesiastical benefice, not vacant at the moment but which will become so, regularly, on the death of its present incumbent.

== History ==
In 1179 the Third Lateran Council, renewing a prohibition already in existence for a long time, forbade such promises or gifts. This prohibition was further extended by Pope Boniface VIII. Nevertheless, during the Middle Ages expectative graces were customarily conferred upon applicants to canonical prebends in the cathedral and collegiate chapters. This fact was due to toleration by the Holy See, which even accorded to the chapters the right of nominating four canons in the way of expectative graces. Several chapters preferred to renounce this right; others continued to employ expectatives even contrary to the canonical enactments.

The popes, especially, made use of this grace from the twelfth century. After having first asked, then ordered, the collators to dispose of certain benefices in favour of ecclesiastics whom they had previously named to them, the popes themselves directly granted, in the way of expectatives, benefices which were not at the moment vacant; they even charged another ecclesiastic with the future investiture of the appointee with the benefice. The privilege of granting expectatives was conceded also to the delegates of the Holy See, the universities, certain princes, etc., with more or less restriction.

This practice aroused grave opposition and gave rise to many abuses, especially during the Western Schism.

== Council of Trent ==
The Council of Trent suppressed all expectatives excepting the designation of a coadjutor with the right of succession in the case of bishops and abbots; there are additionally the prefects Apostolic. Although the council intended to forbid also the collation of expectatives by privileges granted by the pope, still the latter is not bound by such a prohibition. However, the only expectatives now in use are those authorized by the Council of Trent.
