= Kirkmichael, Dumfries and Galloway =

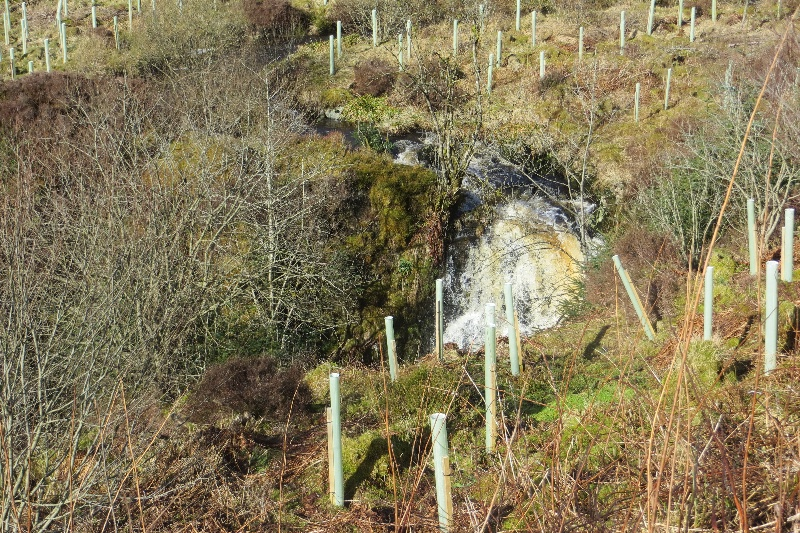

Kirkmichael, is a locality, and parish in Dumfries and Galloway, Scotland. It is located 8.5 miles (13.7 km) northeast of Dumfries.

Kirkmichael House, now know the Barony is located within the locality.
