= Pehtwine =

Anglo-Saxon Bishop of Whithorn

Pehtwine or Peohtwine ("Friend of the Picts"; died 776 × 777) was an 8th-century Anglo-Saxon Bishop of Whithorn, in Scotland. The Anglo-Saxon Chronicle records his consecration as bishop at a place called Ælfetee, it has been suggested that this was Elvet in County Durham, although there is no archeological support for this; the consecration was perhaps conducted by Egbert, Archbishop of York. The same source(s) inform us that he died in either 776 or 777, on the "thirteenth before the Kalends of October", i.e. on 19 September; it also says he was bishop for 14 winters.

== Notes ==
Religious titles
Preceded by Frithwald	Bishop of Whithorn; 762 × 764–776 × 777	Succeeded by Æthelberht
