= Michael MacKenlagh =

Michael MacKenlagh (Scottish Gaelic: Mìcheal MacFhionnlaigh) was Bishop of Galloway or Whithorn (1355–58). He had previously been Prior of Whithorn, head of the cathedral's monastery and leader of the local religious elite. He was elected to the episcopate sometime between March 1354, the death date of his predecessor, and June 1355, when it was recorded that he had been granted safe conduct by Edward III of England to receive confirmation by John, Archbishop of York. The latter date and event indicates a recent election, almost certainly in the year 1355. He was consecrated in July of that year by William Edendon, Bishop of Winchester. He is recorded for the last time in January 1358, when it is recorded that he received a letter of safe-conduct by King Edward to visit the Archbishop of York. His successor, the priest Thomas MacDowell, was bishop by December 1359.

Religious titles
Preceded by Simon de Wedale	Bishop of Galloway; 1355–x1359	Succeeded by Thomas MacDowell
