= Kirkandrews, Dumfries and Galloway =

Hamlet in Dumfries and Galloway, Scotland

Coordinates: 54.809°N 4.179°W

Kirkandrews
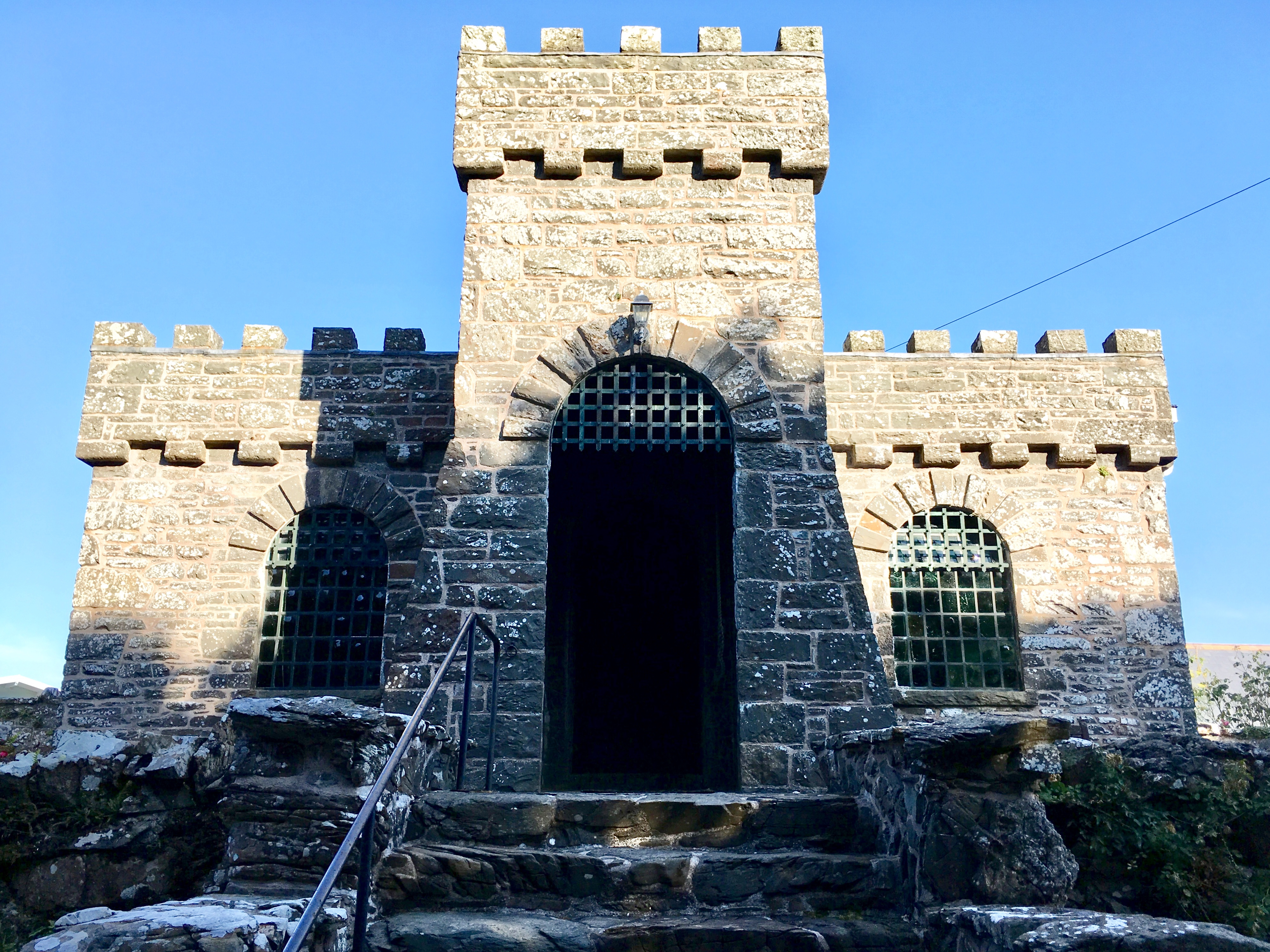
- Kirkandrews Kirk (completed 1906)

- Location within Dumfries and Galloway
- OS grid reference: NX600481
- Council area: Dumfries and Galloway
- Lieutenancy area: Kirkcudbrightshire
- Country: Scotland
- Sovereign state: United Kingdom
- Post town: KIRKCUDBRIGHT
- Postcode district: DG6
- Dialling code: 01557
- Police: Scotland
- Fire: Scottish
- Ambulance: Scottish
- UK Parliament: Dumfries and Galloway
- Scottish Parliament: Galloway and West Dumfries

Kirkandrews, sometimes written as Kirkanders in older documents, is a coastal hamlet about 9 kilometres (6 mi) west-southwest of Kirkcudbright in Dumfries and Galloway, Scotland. It sits in farmland at the head of Kirkandrews Bay, an inlet of Wigtown Bay.

The history of Kirkandrews' name is not altogether clear. Some authors have suggested that it was named for a Northumbrian or Irish saint who established a church here in the first millennium; certainly there was an ancient church at the site, but most recent scholarship suggests that both the original church and its name have been lost, and that a new church was built and dedicated to St Andrew, the apostle and patron saint of Scotland, at some point before 1174.

Evidence of human habitation at the site dates to the Iron Age, and a Christian church has been there since the early medieval period. Originally an independent parish, it was amalgamated into the parish of Borgue in the 1790s. There was a barony of Kirkandrews, which changed hands many times during its history. By the nineteenth century it had declined to the status of a small hamlet within the grounds of the Knockbrex estate, which was purchased in 1894 by James Brown of Affleck & Brown, who embarked on a series of building works that would put his distinctive, flamboyant architectural stamp on Kirkandrews and its immediate vicinity.

There are no shops or commercial businesses in the hamlet, but there are a number of historical sites. These include the ancient churchyard with some surviving stonework from its medieval church, a listed village hall that is used for religious services and private events, and a short distance along the coast there is a dun, built in the Iron Age and reused by Scandinavians, which was renovated in the early 20th century and has since been designated a scheduled monument.

== Name ==
Kirkandrews takes its name, sometimes written as Kirkanders in historical records, from that of its ruined medieval church, but the history of the church's dedication is not clear. Local author Andrew McCulloch writes that it is named for a Northumbrian saint called Andrew, and the nineteenth-century writers William Daniell and Richard Ayton, in an account of their travels in the region, report that St Andrew is said to have arrived there by sea from Ireland. A similar account is given by W. J. Pennell in The Story of Knockbrex, which reports that the church was built on the site by monks from Iona Abbey, and was named for a 9th-century Irish saint called Andrew.

Other authors take a different view. George Chalmers, in his account of Scottish history Caledonia, indicates that it was named for the St Andrew, the apostle and patron saint of Scotland. R. C. Reid, a fellow of the Society of Antiquaries of Scotland, argues that the original name of the church must have been lost because the prefix 'Kirk' is not one that would have been used at the time when Ionian monks were active in the area. He suggests that the church was probably rebuilt at some point prior to 1174 and rededicated to St Andrew at that time. A 1970 assessment by the Ordnance Survey's Archaeology Division also noted that it was probably rededicated to St Andrew in the 12th century, and that its earlier dedication is unknown. Local historian Daphne Brooke agrees with this assessment, and suggests that the choice of St Andrew, a fisherman, would have been in keeping with Kirkandrew's status as a port town.

== Geography ==
Kirkandrews sits amidst fields of arable farmland at the head of Kirkandrews Bay, an inlet of Wigtown Bay. It is approximately 9 kilometres (6 mi) west-southwest from Kirkcudbright, and 3 kilometres (2 mi) west of Borgue in the Stewartry of Kirkcudbright in Dumfries and Galloway, Scotland.

The closest weather observation site is at Dundrennan, 11 kilometres (7 mi) away from Kirkandrews. The observations are taken at an elevation of 113 metres (371 ft), considerably higher than Kirkandrews which is around 10 metres (33 ft) above sea level.

Climate data for Dundrennan, Kirkcudbrightshire, elevation: 113 m (371 ft), 1981–2010
Month	Jan	Feb	Mar	Apr	May	Jun	Jul	Aug	Sep	Oct	Nov	Dec	Year
Mean daily maximum °C (°F)	6.2 (43.2)	6.4 (43.5)	8.0 (46.4)	10.5 (50.9)	13.8 (56.8)	16.0 (60.8)	17.8 (64.0)	17.6 (63.7)	15.7 (60.3)	12.3 (54.1)	9.1 (48.4)	6.7 (44.1)	11.7 (53.0)
Mean daily minimum °C (°F)	2.1 (35.8)	1.9 (35.4)	2.9 (37.2)	4.2 (39.6)	6.9 (44.4)	9.5 (49.1)	11.6 (52.9)	11.5 (52.7)	9.9 (49.8)	7.5 (45.5)	4.6 (40.3)	2.4 (36.3)	6.3 (43.3)
Average rainfall mm (inches)	102.7 (4.04)	77.6 (3.06)	95.4 (3.76)	74.0 (2.91)	67.5 (2.66)	74.5 (2.93)	82.8 (3.26)	95.8 (3.77)	99.4 (3.91)	139.1 (5.48)	118.8 (4.68)	114.9 (4.52)	1,142.5 (44.98)
Average rainy days (≥ 1 mm)	15.5	12.3	14.5	12.2	11.1	10.7	12.6	13.2	12.4	16.1	15.3	14.1	159.8
Source: Met Office

== History ==
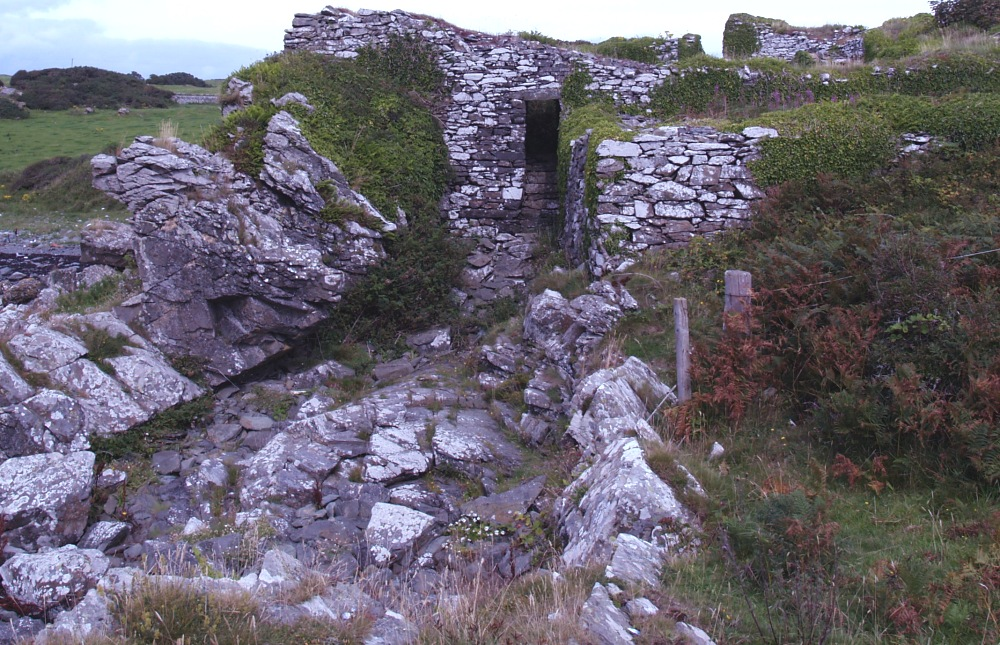
The dun at Castle Haven, an Iron Age stone fort extensively renovated in the early 20th century

The area around Kirkandrews Bay retains evidence of very early human activity. At Tongue Croft, in a field just to the east of the village, is a rock bearing a set of four prehistoric cup and ring marks with up to six rings. There are signs of Iron Age habitation at Castle Haven, 700 metres (0.4 mi) along the coastline to the north west, in the form of a 1st-century BCE dun. This structure shows signs of reuse in the late first millennium, and was largely rebuilt and heightened in 1905. It is known locally as the Borg or Borgue, probably from the Old Norwegian word for a fort, indicating probable Scandinavian use.

Angles from Northumbria conquered much of south west Scotland in the 7th century, and there is evidence of an Anglian coastal settlement at Kirkandrews. Older histories record that a church was established at the site by monks from Iona very early in Scotland's Christian history, and that it was transferred to the ownership of Holyrood Abbey in the 12th century by William the Lion. More recent work has called some of these details into question. Brooke argues that there were in fact two early Christian settlements in the vicinity called Kirkandrews: this one, Kirkandrews Purton (port village), and another some miles away known as Kirkandrews Balmaghie (village in the woods). She believes that it was Kirkandrews Balmaghie that was founded by Iona and later transferred to Holyrood, but agrees that there was certainly an Anglian religious settlement at Kirkandrews Porton, and that the old churchyard that survives today is at least pre-conquest in age.

In the 13th century, the barony of Kirkandrews was granted to Robert de Champaign, brother to the constable of Roxburgh Castle Ralph de Champaign. Robert ruled the area from a substantial nearby stronghold, the earthworks of which survive and are known as Roberton Motte. It passed to his son, also named Robert, and then to his daughter Margaret and her husband, the Northumbrian nobleman Bernard de Rippelay. There are records of the lands being leased by William Lennox of Cally in the 15th century, and in 1472 James III granted the barony to William, Lord Moneypenny, who had served as a Scottish diplomat at the French court of Louis XI.

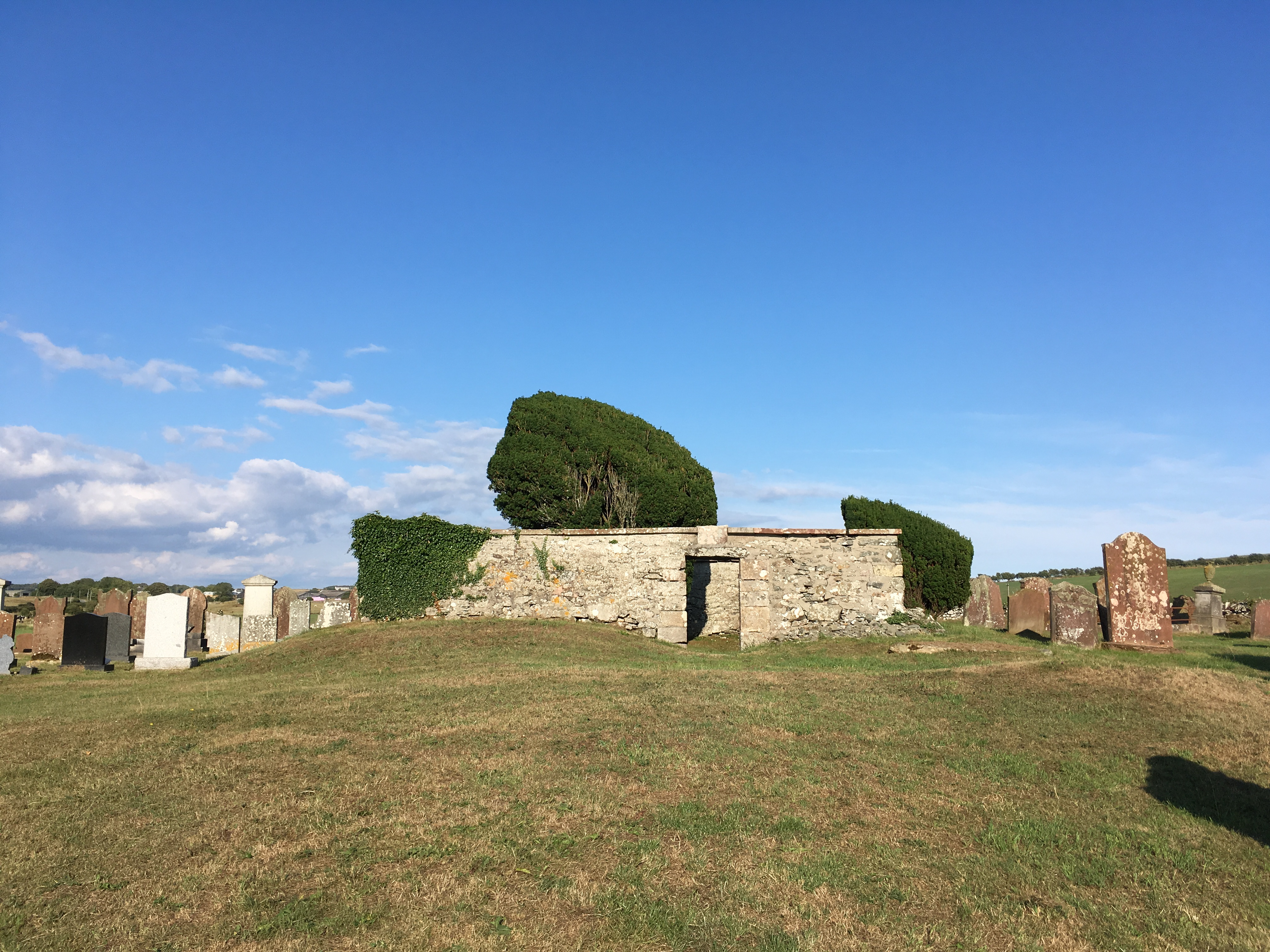
Kirkandrews Old Churchyard viewed from the west

In the late 16th century the barony was purchased by John Gordon of Lochinvar, and in the 17th century the village hosted thriving annual markets. The minister Andrew Symson, in his Large Description of Galloway published in 1684, records that "in the kirk-yard of Kirkanders, upon the ninth day of August, there is a fair kept, called St. Lawrence Fair, where all sorts of merchant-wares are to be sold; but the fair only lasts for three or four hours, and then the people, who flock hither in great companies, drink and debauch, and commonly great lewdness is committed here at this fair."

In the late 1790s, the Statistical Accounts of Scotland record that the parish of Kirkandrews was merged with those of Borgue and Senwick; the new amalgamated parish was known simply as Borgue. The Accounts also record that a planned village was to be built at Kirkandrews by Lord Daer, but this plan was never realised. The settlement around that time appears to have been in a very run-down condition: Daniel and Ayton, recounting their visit in the summer of 1813, described it as "the ne plus ultra of lowness and obscurity". They explain that it had previously been a centre of smuggling but that customs officers had seized all the village's boats and broken up the racket, leaving the inhabitants with no means of making an income.

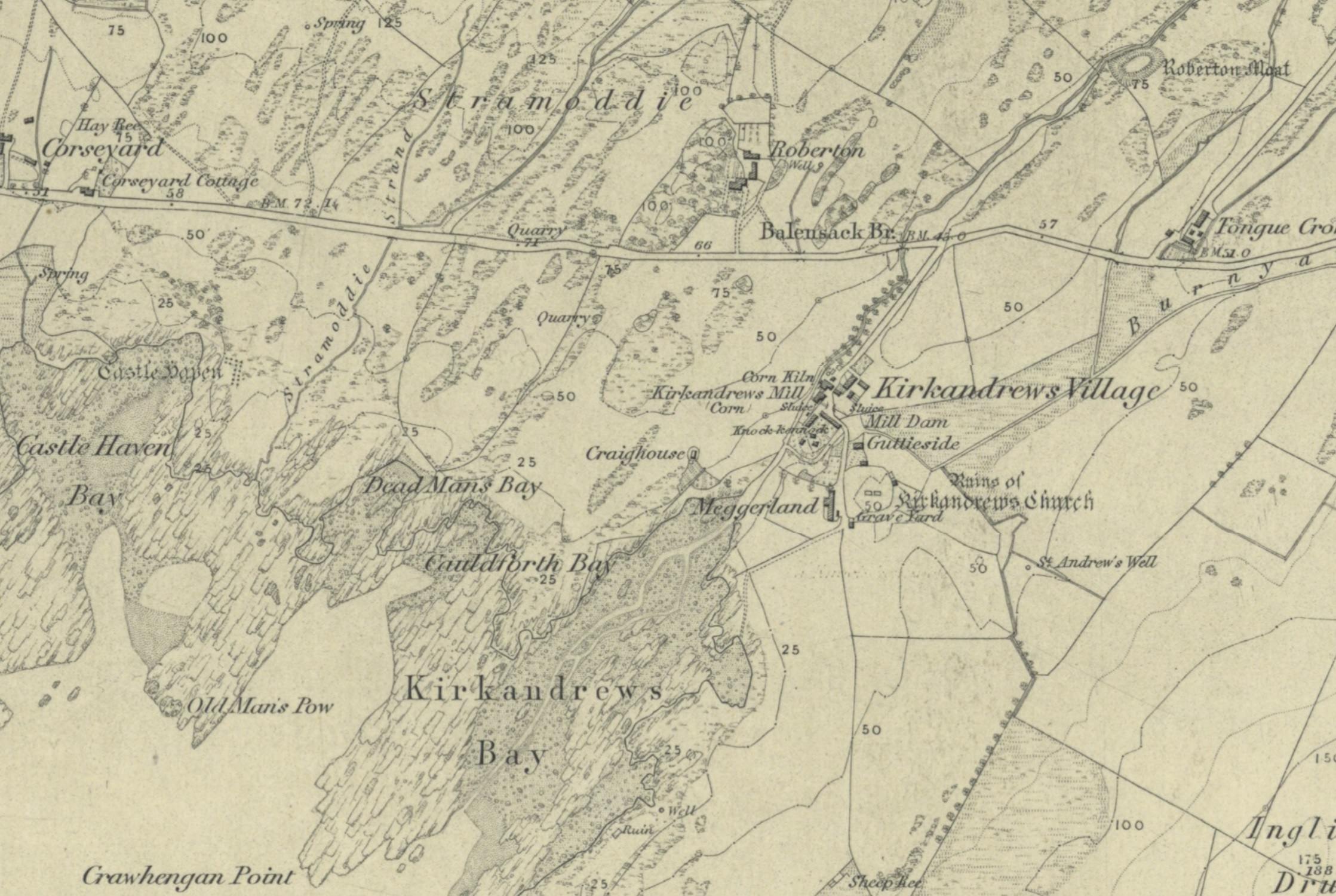
Kirkandrews in the 1854 Ordnance Survey map

The Ordnance Survey map of 1854 shows a corn mill at Kirkandrews, and four buildings labelled Guttieside, Meggerland, Craighouse and Knockkennock. By the late 19th century, Kirkandrews seems to have become a quiet and romantic backwater. A guidebook to the area, published in 1876, describes a pleasant walk into the village, where "the murmur of the little stream, as it glides over the stones and brushwood in its course, is wafted to the ear, and nought of din, or sign of life, is heard or seen, save one of the aged liferenters drawing water from a pool of the running stream, or the grating sound of the mill wheel revolving on its rusty axle." The author comments on the "quaint and picturesque" nature of the houses, but also on the fact that some of them were derelict, and "only fit models for the painter." The 1885 Ordnance Gazetteer of Scotland notes Kirkandrews' decline, from "a place of some note, long the scene of an annual fair, with horse and foot races, to the condition of a small, picturesque hamlet."

By 1894, Kirkandrews was a part of the nearby estate of Knockbrex, which was acquired by James Brown, a successful draper from Manchester who had been made rich by the department store he helped establish, Affleck & Brown. He set about a programme of building on the estate, renovating existing structures and constructing new ones, all in a distinctive and individual style influenced by the Arts and Crafts movement, and described by Historic Environment Scotland as having "a stylistic individuality bordering on the idiosyncratic". These buildings, mostly castellated and ornately decorated, include a folly known as the Toy Fort; Corseyard Farm, a dairy built to resemble a large castle tower; and within Kirkandrews itself a village hall known as Kirkandrews Kirk. Brown was also responsible for the reconstruction and heightening of the dun at Castle Haven, an act described by one local writer as "well-meant vandalism"; what remains of it today has been described as "an important example of Edwardian restoration of a specialised Iron Age stone fort".

== Kirkandrews today ==
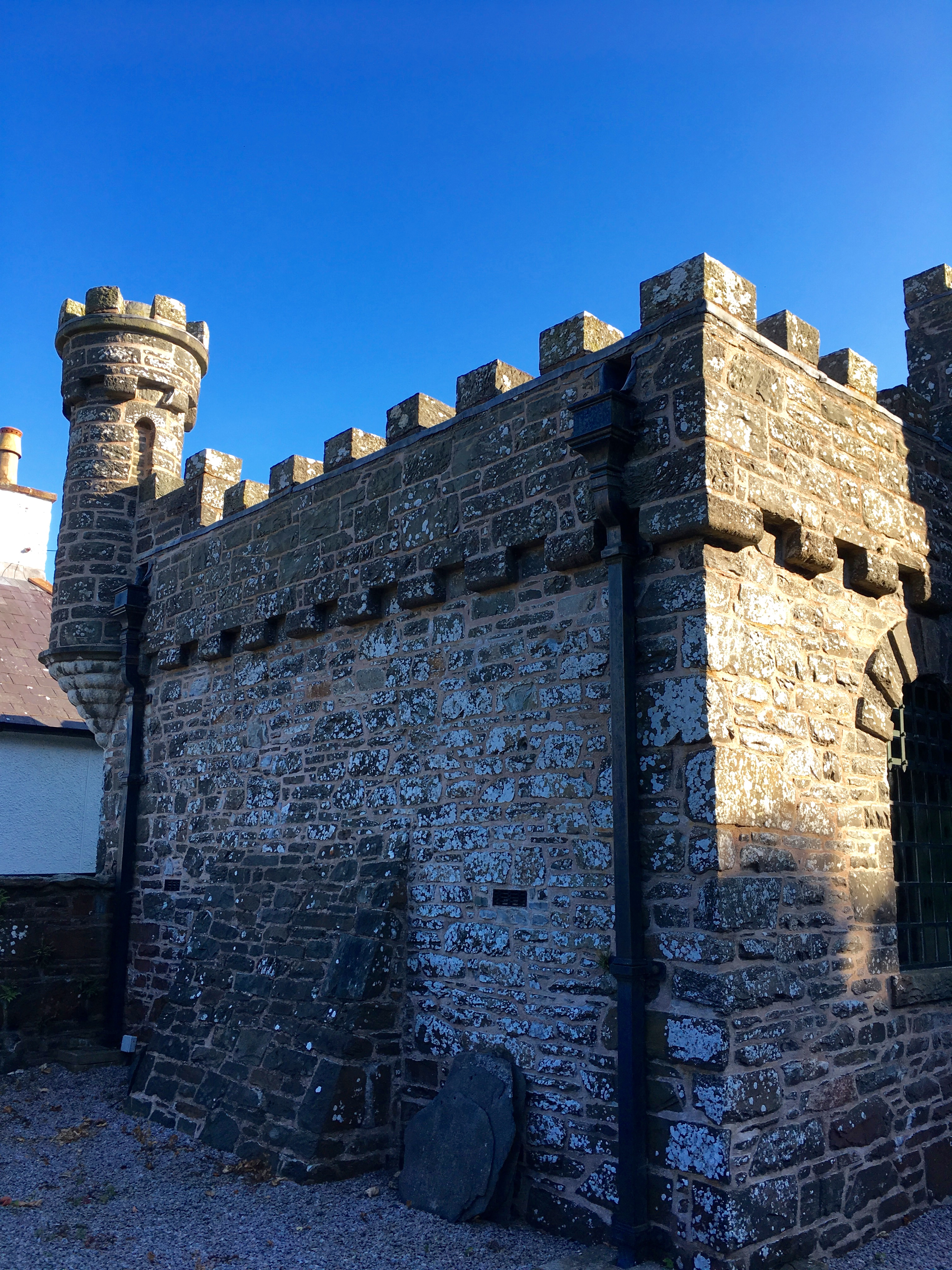
The chimney of Kirkandrews Kirk

Modern Kirkandrews consists of a handful of domestic buildings, but there are no shops or other businesses. It is approached by a single-lane road which follows the Pulwhirrin Burn south from the main road. The first building the road passes is Kirkandrews Kirk, the village hall built by James Brown and completed in 1906, and a Category B listed building. Designed by the Arts and Crafts architect George Harry Higginbottom, it is accessed through an elaborate timber lychgate, and made to resemble a small castle. It is buttressed and crenellated, with mock portcullises built into the round arches above the doorway and windows. The interior walls are lined with a carved wooden dado with Celtic designs, and there is a rubble fireplace surmounted by a heraldic panel depicting St Andrew; the chimney above the fireplace is disguised externally to look like a turret. Built into the walls of the enclosure around the kirk are memorials for members of the Brown family, including James Brown himself, who died in 1920. The building is maintained by a charity, the Kirkandrews Kirk Trust, and used for ecumenical religious services, weddings and private functions.

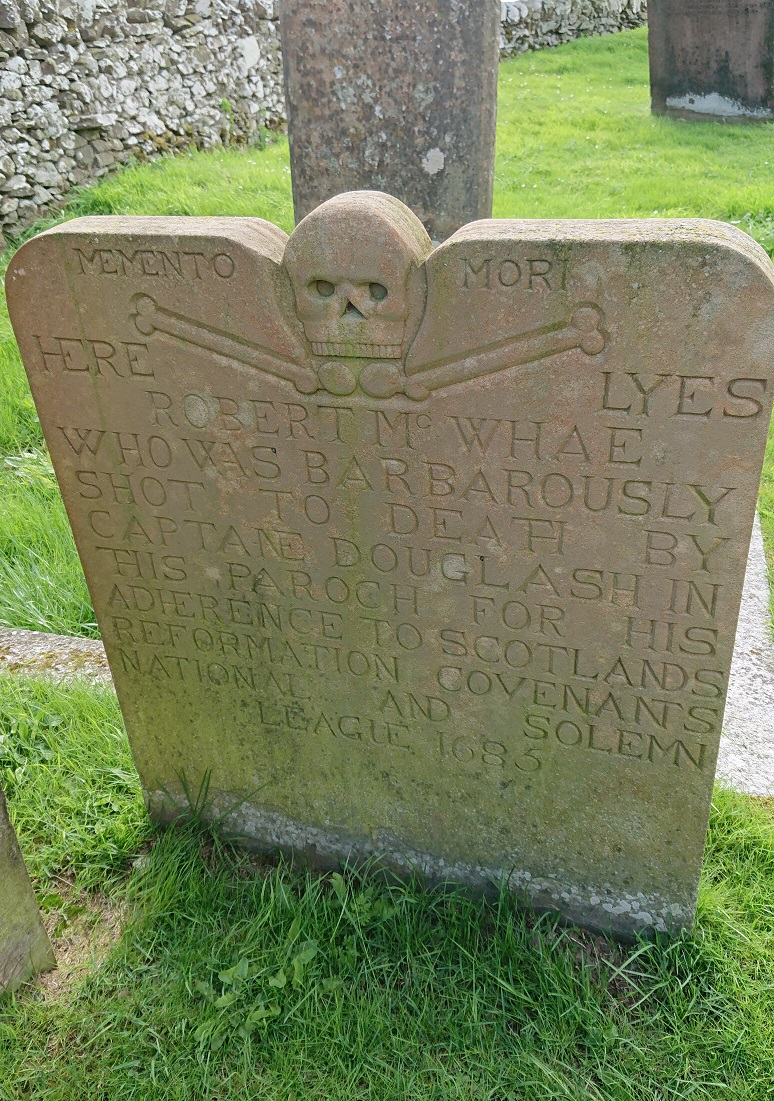
The memorial to Robert McWhae

The road passes a number of houses, then comes to the old medieval churchyard. The church no longer remains as a complete building, but two burial enclosures in the middle of the yard appear to incorporate some of the fabric of its original walls. There are gravestones and memorials in the churchyard dating back to the 18th century, and because Lance Corporal Francis James Elms, who died in October 1918 during the First World War, is buried there, the churchyard is registered as a Commonwealth War Grave. A carved stone cross, dated to the 11th or 12th century and now standing in the forecourt of the Stewartry Museum in Kirkcudbright, is thought to have been taken from the churchyard. The poet William Nicholson, who was born in Borgue, is buried in the graveyard, and there is a memorial to Robert McWhae, a Covenanter martyr killed in 1685.

The Castle Haven dun, which was designated a scheduled monument in 1928, is approached from Kirkandrews by a path which crosses the burn over a wooden bridge and follows the coast to the north-west. It is built on a rocky promontory, with inner and outer walls, and is the only known example in Galloway of this type of structure, which is more common in Argyll and the Outer Hebrides. The outer wall, roughly 2.7 metres (8.9 ft) thick, encloses an area of 39 metres (128 ft) by 20 metres (66 ft), with entrances to the north east and south east. The inner enclosure is approximately 18 metres (59 ft) by 11 metres (36 ft), and there are steps up to the top of the walls in the north east corner. Although the walls were substantially heightened by Brown in 1905, the original outline of the walls was faithfully maintained. During the excavations that preceded the modifications, artefacts including bronze spiral finger-rings and a blue glass paste bead, dated to the Iron Age, were discovered, alongside a brooch and fragments of mail that are suggestive of later reuse.

== General sources ==
- Brooke, Daphne (1991). "The Northumbrian settlements in Galloway and Carrick: an historical assessment". Proceedings of the Society of Antiquaries of Scotland. 121: 295–327. doi:10.9750/psas.121.295.327. S2CID 160478203.
- Chalmers, George (1824). Caledonia or an Account, Historical and Topographic of North Britain, from the Most Ancient to the Present Times. London: T. Cadell and A. Constable.
- Donnachie, Ian L.; Macleod, Innes (1974). Old Galloway. Newton Abbot Devon: David and Charles (Holdings) Ltd. ISBN 0-7153-6459-6.
- Gifford, John (1996). The Buildings of Scotland:Dumfries and Galloway. London: Penguin. ISBN 0140-71067-1.
- Gordon, Haig (2008). The Kirkcudbrightshire Companion. Kirkcudbright: Galloway Publishing. ISBN 978-0-9553183-3-7.
- Groome, Francis H. (1885). Ordnance Gazetteer of Scotland: A Survey of Scottish Topography, Statistical, Biographical and Historical (Volume IV). Edinburgh: Thomas C. Jack, Grange Publishing Works.
- Historic Environment Scotland. "Castle Haven, dun, Castle Haven Bay (SM1116)".
- Historic Environment Scotland. "Corseyard Farm including Boundary Walls, Tool Shed and Weighbridge (Category A Listed Building LB3381)".
- Historic Environment Scotland. "Kirkandrews Chapel, Burial Ground and Boundary Walls (Category B Listed Building LB3383)".
- Historic Environment Scotland. "Knockbrex "Toy Fort", Gatepiers, Gates and Boundary Walls (Category B Listed Building LB3398)".
- Hume, John R (2000). Dumfries and Galloway: An Illustrated Architectural Guide. Edinburgh: The Rutland Press. ISBN 1-873-190-344.
- "Kirkandrews Church Kirkandrews Dumfries and Galloway". Architects of Greater Manchester. The Manchester Group of the Victorian Society.
- "Kirkandrews, Dumfries and Galloway". Get Outside. Ordnance Survey.
- "Kirkandrews Kirk". Kirkandrews Kirk. Kirkandrews Kirk Trust. Archived from the original on 11 August 2020.
- "Kirkandrews, Old Church And Burial-ground". Canmore. Historic Environment Scotland.
- "Kirkandrews Old Churchyard". Commonwealth War Graves. Commonwealth War Graves Commission.
- "Roberton Motte". Canmore. Historic Environment Scotland.
- Macleod, Innes (1986). Discovering Galloway. Edinburgh: John Donald Publishers Ltd. ISBN 0-85976-114-2.
- Macleod, Innes (1988). Sailing on Horseback. Dumfries: T. C. Farries and Co. Ltd. ISBN 0-948278-06-4.
- McCulloch, Andrew (2000). Galloway: A Land Apart. Edinburgh: Birlinn Ltd. ISBN 1-84158-027-9.
- McLachlan Harper, Malcolm (1876). Rambles in Galloway: Topographical, Historical, Traditional and Biographical. Edinburgh: Edmonston and Douglas.
- Pennell, W. J. The Story of Knockbrex. Castle Douglas.
- Reid, R. C. (1949). "The Church of Kirkandrews" (PDF). Transactions and Journal of Proceedings of the Dumfriesshire and Galloway Natural History and Antiquarian Society. 26: 114–118. Archived from the original (PDF) on 29 July 2019.
- "Scotland - Land Use Viewer". National Library of Scotland.
- Stell, Geoffrey (1996). Dumfries and Galloway. Edinburgh: The Stationery Office. ISBN 0-11-495294-9.
