= Prior of Whithorn =

The Prior of Whithorn was the head of the monastic community at Whithorn Priory, attached to the bishopric of Galloway at Whithorn. It was originally an Augustinian establishment, but became Premonstratensian by the time of the second or third known prior. As most of the priors of Whithorn appear to be native Galwegian Gaels, it would appear that most priors before the 16th century at least were drawn from region, something unusual in medieval Scotland. The following is a list of abbots and commendators.

== List of priors of Whithorn ==
- Edanus (Adam or Áedan), 1154 x 1161
- William (?), 1172x1178
- Michael, 1200 x 1209.
- Malcolm, 1209 x 1226
- Paul, 1217 x 1235
- Duncan, 1235
- Gregory, 1235 x1253
- Duncan, 1273
- Dungal, 1279
- Thomas, 1287
- John, 1293 -1294
- Maurice, 1296
- Michael MacKenlagh (or de Makenlagh), 1355
- Gilbert, 1382-1413
- Thomas "Macilhachnisi" ("Makillehachuyfy"), 1413 -1431
- James Cameron, 1446
- William Douglas, 1447-1467 x 1468
- Fergus MacDowell, 1466-1470
- David Ralston, 1468
- David Lindsay, 1470
- Roger, 1473
- Patrick Vaus, 1474 -1503
- Patrick McCathroge [MacCaffrey?], x 1477
- Thomas Adunnale, 1470s
- Henry MacDowell, 1503-1514 x 1516

== List of commendators ==
- Alexander Stewart de Pitcairne, 1516-1518
- Silvio Passarini, 1516-1526
- Gavin Dunbar, 1518-1524
- William Dick, 1520
- John Maxwell, 1524
- Ninian Fleming, 1524-1537 x 1539
- Abraham Vaus, 1532
- Malcolm Fleming, 1539-1568
- Robert Stewart, 1568-1581 x 1582
- William Fleming, 1568-1594
- Patrick Stewart, 1582-1605
- Gavin Hamilton, 1605-1612

== Bibliography ==
- Donaldson, Gordon, "The Bishops and Priors of Whithorn", in Dumfriesshire and Galloway Natural History & Antiquarians Society: Transactions and Journal of Proceedings, Third Series, vol. 27 (1950), pp. 127–54
- Dowden, John, The Bishops of Scotland, ed. J. Maitland Thomson, (Glasgow, 1912)
- Watt, D.E.R. & Shead, N.F. (eds.), The Heads of Religious Houses in Scotland from the 12th to the 16th Centuries, The Scottish Records Society, New Series, Volume 24, (Edinburgh, 2001), pp. 216–20

== See also ==
- Whithorn Priory
- Bishop of Galloway
