= Alexander Vaus =

Scottish prelate (??–c.1450)

- Bishop of Galloway
- Church: Roman Catholic Church
- See: Diocese of Galloway
- In office: 1422–1450
- Predecessor: Thomas de Buittle
- Successor: Thomas Spens
- Previous posts: Bishop of Orkney (unconsecrated); Bishop of Caithness; Precentor of Dornoch Cathedral; Archdeacon of Caithness

Orders
- Consecration: before 16 July 1380

Personal details
- Born: unknown Probably Scotland
- Died: unknown, though after 1450

Alexander Vaus [Vause, de Vaus] (died after 1450) was a late 14th century and 15th century Scottish prelate. Said to have been the younger son of one Patrick Vaus (died 1392), he apparently held "church livings" in Galloway as early as 1421.

He is found in possession of the precentorship of Dornoch Cathedral, seat (cathedra) of the diocese of Caithness, when a papal mandate from Avignon Pope Benedict XIII, 25 July 1398, authorised his appointment as Archdeacon of Caithness:

To William de Gerland and Thomas de Edname, canons of Caithness, and the official of Caithness. Mandate to collate Alexander Vause, of noble birth, precentor of Caithness, to the archdeaconry of Caithness, a non-elective, non-major dignity with cure, value not exceeding 30 merks sterling, vacant because John de Innes had held it for more than a year without being raised to the priesthood, and without dispensation, and still unlawfully detains it at present; notwithstanding that Alexander is known to hold the said precentorship, which, however, on his peaceful assecution to the archdeaconry he is to demit.

He may have held this archdeaconry for as many as nine years, until he was provided as Bishop of Orkney by Pope Benedict XIII sometime between the date of the above letter and 7 November 1408, probably close to the latter date.

It is not clear if he ever obtained possession of the bishopric of Orkney, being opposed by the nominee of the Roman pope, probably John Pak of Colchester, and by the King of Norway with Orkney's metropolitan, the Archbishop of Trondheim. A letter from the Avignon pope, dated 12 February 1408, granted faculty to Alexander to be consecrated as Bishop of Orkney by three other bishops, "without prejudice to the archbishop of Nidaros to whom Orkney is accustomed to be subject". Alexander does not appear to have been consecrated by the time he was provided, on 4 May 1414, to the bishopric of Caithness.

Alexander received from the Pope an indult for local consecration, dated 22 January 1415, and although the act of consecration itself is unrecorded, he was certainly consecrated by 16 January 1419, when he appeared for the first time as full bishop in a Melrose Abbey document. He was Bishop of Caithness for around eight years, before being translated again, on 4 December 1422, to become Bishop of Galloway. His translation occurred while Alexander was present at the papal see, following the death of Bishop Thomas de Buittle.

Alexander was told by the papacy to take the oath of fealty to the Pope Martin V in the presence of the Bishop of Glasgow and the Bishop of Dunkeld. He held the bishopric of Galloway for nearly twenty-eight years. Little of Vaus' activities as Bishop of Galloway, like any of the sees that he held are particularly well documented. He witnessed a charter of Margaret, Duchess of Touraine and Countess of Douglas, at "Treyff", on 26 November 1426, and on 22 September 1429. He attended the Perth parliament of 10 March 1430. He is found again in the Register of the Great Seal on 24 July and again on 6 September 1444. He resigned the see to Thomas Spens on 8 January 1450. The later historian Hector Boece related that Bishop Vaus had gone to a great deal of effort to enable Spens to succeed him. Vaus seems to have lived for some time after his voluntary resignation of the see of Galloway, as it was said by Boece that Spens refrained from being styled as lord or bishop in the presence of the elderly Vaus.

== Notes ==
Religious titles
Preceded by John Derling	Precentor of Caithness; 1368× –1398	Succeeded by Alexander de Sutherland
Preceded by John de Innes	Archdeacon of Caithness; 1398– ×1407	Succeeded by Alexander Barber
Preceded by Robert Sinclair	Bishop of Orkney (Avignon); 1398 × 1407–1414	Succeeded by William Stephani
Preceded by Alexander Man	Bishop of Caithness; 1414–1422	Succeeded by John de Crannach
Preceded by Thomas de Buittle	Bishop of Galloway; 1422–1450	Succeeded by Thomas Spens
