= Bishop of Galloway =

Ecclesiastical position

The Bishop of Galloway, also called the Bishop of Whithorn, is the ecclesiastical head of the Diocese of Galloway, said to have been founded by Saint Ninian in the mid-5th century. The subsequent Anglo-Saxon bishopric was founded in the late 7th century or early 8th century, and the first known bishop was one Pehthelm, "shield of the Picts". According to Anglo-Saxon ecclesiastical tradition, the bishopric was founded by Saint Ninian, a later corruption of the British name Uinniau or Irish Finian; although there is no contemporary evidence, it is quite likely that there had been a British or Hiberno-British bishopric before the Anglo-Saxon takeover. After Heathored (fl. 833), no bishop is known until the apparent resurrection of the diocese in the reign of King Fergus of Galloway. The bishops remained, uniquely for Scottish bishops, the suffragans of the Archbishop of York until 1359 when the pope released the bishopric from requiring metropolitan assent. James I formalised the admission of the diocese into the Scottish church on 26 August 1430 and just as all Scottish sees, Whithorn was to be accountable directly to the pope. The diocese was placed under the metropolitan jurisdiction of St Andrews on 17 August 1472 and then moved to the province of Glasgow on 9 January 1492. The diocese disappeared during the Scottish Reformation, but was recreated by the Catholic Church in 1878 with its cathedra at Dumfries, although it is now based at Ayr.

== Pre-Reformation bishops ==
=== List of known Anglo-Saxon bishops of Whithorn ===
Tenure	Incumbent	Notes
731 – 735	Pehthelm	Died in office.
d. 762 x 764	Frithwald	
d. 776 x 777	Pehtwine	
bp. 777	Æthelberht of Whithorn	Was translated to the bishopric of Hexham around 789.
790 – c. 803	Beadwulf	Last known Bishop of the Northumbrian era.

Heathored is described as the successor to Beadwulf by some accounts. His inclusion on the list as a Bishop of Whithorn is not credible.

=== List of known bishops of Galloway/Whithorn ===
Tenure (an "x" between two years indicates a range of possible starting or ending dates)	Incumbent	Notes
1128–1154	Gille Aldan	
1154–1186	Christian of Whithorn	
1189–1209	John of Whithorn	
1209–1235	Walter of Whithorn	
1235–1253	Gilbert of Glenluce	
1235	Odo Ydonc (bishop-elect)	Elected in opposition to Gilbert, lost litigation and therefore was never consecrated, and never took possession of see.
1253–1293	Henry of Holyrood	
1294–1324 x 1326	Thomas de Kirkcudbright	Also called Thomas de Dalton and Thomas de Galloway.
1326–1355	Simon de Wedale	Previously Abbot of Holyrood.
1355–1358 x 1359	Michael MacKenlagh	
1358 x 1359–1362 x 1363	Thomas MacDowell (bishop-elect)	
1363–1378	Adam de Lanark	
el. 1378x1379; cons. 1379	Oswald of Glenluce	Anti-Bishop of the Western Schism. Consecrated with the support of the Archbishop of York and Pope Urban VI, in opposition to the other Galloway bishops, who were supporter of the Avignon Pope. Never took possession of see.
1378 x 1379	Ingram de Ketenis	Received papal provision, but refused to accept the position.
1379–1393 x 1394	Thomas de Rossy	
1409–1412 x 1415	Elisaeus Adougan	
1412 x 1415	Gilbert Cavan (bishop-elect)	Antipope Benedict XIII rejected his election in favour of Thomas de Buittle.
1415–1422 x 1422	Thomas de Buittle	
1422–1450	Alexander Vaus	Previously Bishop of Caithness.
1450–1457/8	Thomas Spens	Translated to the Bishopric of Aberdeen in 1457.
1457	Thomas Vaus	Dean of Glasgow, provided to bishopric on translation of Spens to Aberdeen in 1457; as this translation was not effective, and had to be repeated in 1458, but Vaus' provision was not repeated.
1458–1480 x 1482	Ninian Spot	
1482–1508	George Vaus	
1508–1509	James Beaton	Became Archbishop of Glasgow.
1509–1526	David Arnot	
1526–1541	Henry Wemyss	
1541–1558	Andrew Durie	
1559–1560	Alexander Gordon	Formerly Archbishop of Glasgow (1550–51), titular Archbishop of Athens (1551–53) and Bishop of the Isles (1553–59); appointed Bishop of Galloway by the Holy See in 1559; he became a Protestant when the Church of Scotland broke links with the Roman Catholic Church in 1560.

== Post-Reformation bishops ==
=== Church of Scotland succession ===
Tenure	Incumbent	Notes
1560–1575	Alexander Gordon	Died in office
1575–1586	John Gordon	Roger Gordon got crown provision and a mandate for consecration, but never actually seems to have taken control of the see. John Gordon resigned in 1586 in favour of his brother George.
1578–1579 × 1587	Roger Gordon	Got crown provision in 1578, but does not appear to have been able to oust John Gordon.
1586–1588	George Gordon	
1588–1605	See vacant	Due to hostility to episcopacy in Scotland, there was a lull in appointing new bishops in this period, though no bishops in possession were deposed.
1605–1612	Gavin Hamilton	
1612–1619	William Couper	
1619–1634	Andrew Lamb	Translated from the bishopric of Brechin.
1635–1638	Thomas Sydserf	Along with every other bishop in Scotland, he was deprived of his bishopric in 1638. He became bishop of Orkney in 1661 after The Restoration and the renewal of episcopacy. He died in 1663.
1638–1661	See abolished	The episcopacy was abolished in Scotland for this period.
1661–1674	James Hamilton	First bishop after the renewal of episcopacy.
1676–1679	John Paterson	Translated to the bishopric of Edinburgh.
1679	Arthur Rose	Previously Bishop of Argyll. He was translated to the Archbishopric of Glasgow, and later became Archbishop of St Andrews.
1680–1687	James Aitken	Previous Bishop of Moray. Resided mostly in Edinburgh.
1687/8–1689	John Gordon	Deprived of the temporalities in 1689 when episcopacy was permanently abolished in the Church of Scotland following the Glorious Revolution.

=== Scottish Episcopal Church succession ===
Tenure	Incumbent	Notes
1689–1697	'John Gordon	After the Glorious Revolution, he continued as a nonjuring bishop until resigned the see in 1697. Later converted to Roman Catholicism and took the name James Clement Gordon.
1697–1731	See administered by the bishops of Edinburgh	
1731–1733	David Freebairn	Also Primus (1731–1738) and Bishop of Edinburgh (1733–1739)
1733–1837	See administered by the bishops of Edinburgh	
In 1837, the see became part of the united bishopric of Glasgow and Galloway

=== Roman Catholic bishops (from 1878) ===
The modern Bishop of Galloway is the Ordinary of the Roman Catholic Diocese of Galloway in the Province of Saint Andrews and Edinburgh.

The Roman Catholic diocese was established on 4 March 1878 from the Vicariate Apostolic of the Western District. The church of Saint Andrew in Dumfries served as pro-cathedral until it was destroyed by a fire in May 1961 and the seat moved to Ayr in 1962. The diocese covers an area of 9,332 km². The see is in the Ecclesiastical City of Ayr. Until 2007 the seat was located at the Cathedral Church of the Good Shepherd which was built in 1957. In early 2007 Pope Benedict XVI accepted the petition of Right Reverend John Cunningham, the 7th Bishop of Galloway, to move the seat to St Margaret's Church, Ayr. After this took place, the Church of the Good Shepherd was closed and largely demolished.

(Any dates appearing in italics indicate de facto continuation of office. The start date of tenure below is the date of appointment or succession. Where known, the date of installation and ordination as bishop are listed in the notes together with the post held prior to appointment.)

Tenure	Incumbent	Notes
22 March 1878 to 16 January 1893	John McLachlan	Priest; ordained 23 May 1878; died in office
16 June 1893 to 19 January 1914	William Turner	Priest; ordained 25 July 1893; died in office
25 May 1914 to 24 December 1943	James McCarthy	Priest; ordained 9 June 1914; died in office
24 December 1943 to 2 February 1952	William Mellon	Coadjutor Bishop of Galloway; died in office
19 July 1952 to 4 April 1981	Joseph McGee	Priest;ordained 11 November 1952; retired
4 April 1981 to 7 April 2004	Maurice Taylor	Priest; ordained 9 June 1981; retired
7 April 2004 to 22 November 2014	John Cunningham	Priest; ordained 28 May 2004; retired
22 November 2014 to 2022	William Nolan	Priest; ordained 22 February 2015; became Archbishop of Glasgow
22 December 2023	Francis Dougan	Priest; ordained 9 March 2024.

== See also ==
- Prior of Whithorn
