= Castle of Park =

Tower house in Dumfries and Galloway, Scotland

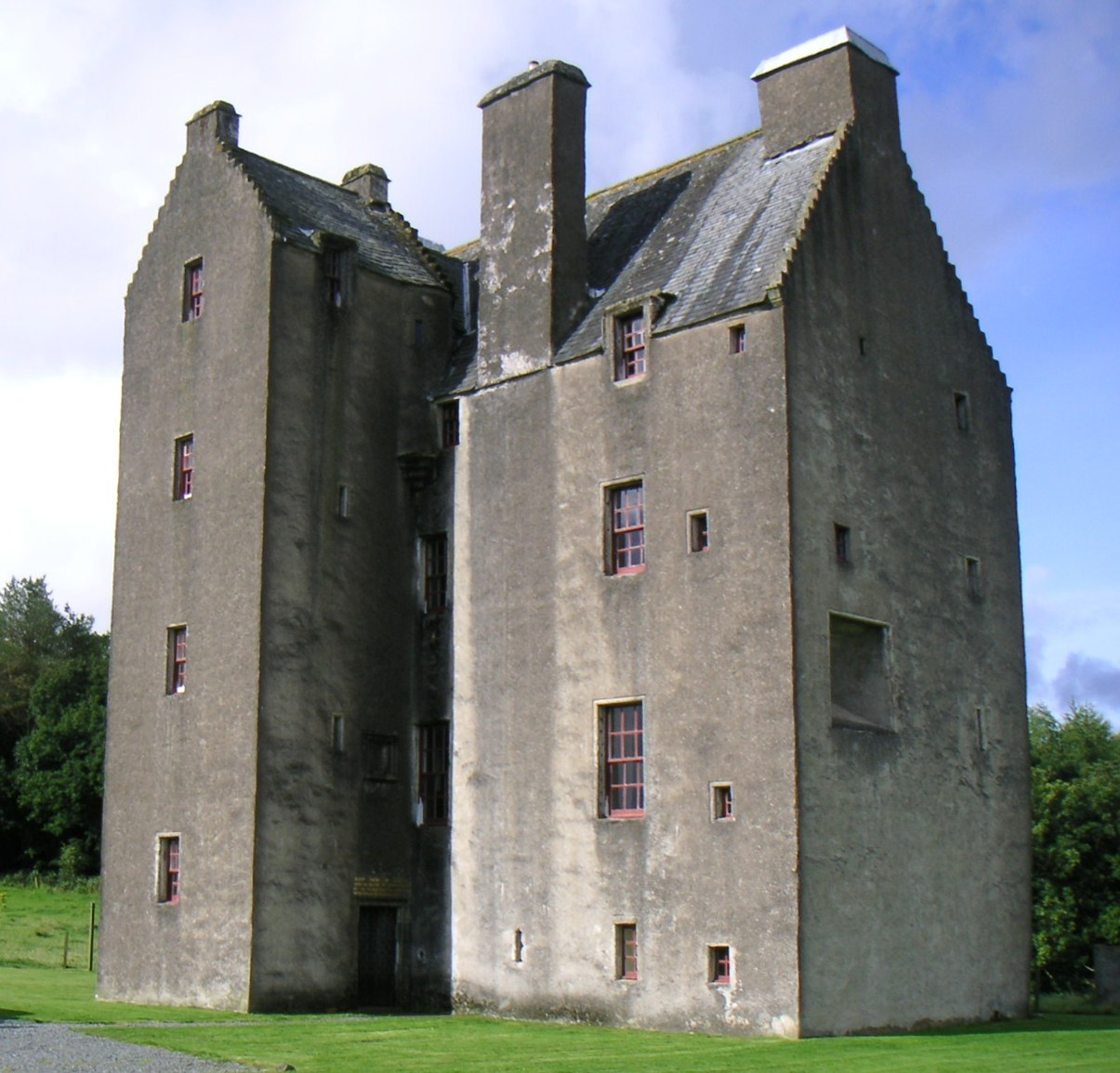

- Location within Dumfries and Galloway

General information
- Type: Tower house
- Location: Glenluce, Scotland
- Coordinates: 54.8760°N 4.8255°W
- Construction started: 1590
- Completed: Before 1599

The Castle of Park is a 16th-century L-plan tower house near Glenluce, in the historic county of Wigtownshire in Dumfries and Galloway, Scotland. It is a category A listed building.

== History ==
The castle was begun in 1590 for Thomas Hay, the son of one of the Commendators of Glenluce Abbey, and his wife Jonet MakDouel. It was completed by 1599.

The building was extended in the 18th century, and was used by the Hay family until Sir John Dalrymple-Hay sold the Park estate in 1875; it was then left uninhabited.

The Cunningham family acquired Castle of Park in 1830. They later abandoned Castle of Park in favour of Dunragit House, using Castle of Park to house farm labourers.

It is reported that Castle of Park is haunted by the ghost of a monk who was murdered by walling him up in one of the rooms. A green lady who became pregnant whilst working at the castle has also been seen through the years.

A program of restoration was carried out in the 1950s and 1960s by the Ministry of Public Building and Works, including removal of the 18th-century wings. In the 1980s, additional work was done by the Landmark Trust. The building is now maintained using income from its use as holiday accommodation.

At various times the building has also been known as "Park Hay", "The Park O' Luce", "Park Castle", "Park House" and "House of Park". The antiquarian Richard Pococke visited in 1760, and described, "The Park, Sir Thomas Hay's, a castle most beautifully situated on a ridge which is at the foot of hill, having towards the river a steep hanging ground covered with wood, and a more gentle descent southwards to the meadows on the bay adorned with trees".

== Description ==
The building is divided into four floors. The lowest floor consists of three barrel vaulted rooms used as kitchens and store-rooms; above this is the main hall measuring some 22 feet (6.7 m) by 17 feet (5.2 m). The third and fourth floors are divided into smaller rooms. The southward projection contains a large spiral staircase, from which a further spiral stair leads to the roof and to a small room above the main stair.

Although imposing, the building is not defensible. Unlike earlier examples such as Drum Castle, the walls are hollowed out with additional staircases and, to quote the 1898 description, "commodious closets".
