= Odo Ydonc =

- Bishop of Galloway (elect)
- Church: Roman Catholic Church
- See: Diocese of Galloway
- In office: 1235–1241 x
- Predecessor: Walter
- Successor: Gilbert
- Previous post(s): Abbot of Dercongal

Orders
- Consecration: None

Personal details
- Born: unknown unknown
- Died: unknown

Odo Ydonc was a 13th-century Premonstratensian prelate. The first recorded appearance of Odo was when he witnessed a charter by Donnchadh, Earl of Carrick, on 21 July 1225. In this document he is already Abbot of Dercongal, incidentally the first Abbot of Dercongal to appear on record.

Dercongal Abbey (also Holywood Abbey, from Latin Sancti Nemoris), which is Gaelic or Irish Doire Conghaill, "oak-wood of St Congall", was a recently established house of Premonstratensian canons, perhaps founded by Alan, Lord of Galloway, but Odo's appearance is the first time we know about the abbey's existence. An abbot of Dercongal, unnamed but surely Odo, was recorded as a papal mandatory in a document of Paisley Abbey on 18 December the same year (1225).

It is unknown from what point or rather until at what point Odo held the abbacy of Dercongal, but by 11 March 1235, when he next appeared on the record, he was merely a former abbot, and thus had been demoted in the intervening period. This appearance in the sources occurs because the Prior of Whithorn and the canons of Whithorn Priory chose to elect Odo as their own candidate to succeed Bishop Walter as Bishop of Galloway; as Odo was a fellow Premonstratensian and a canon of Whithorn, he was thus "one of them" and a natural choice.

Unfortunately for Odo, King Alexander II of Scotland had his own candidate, another former abbot, Gilbert of Glenluce, Cistercian ex-Abbot of Glenluce, now monk of Melrose Abbey; Alexander was recently crushing a revolt in Galloway, and probably took an interest in the new bishop for this reason. Appeals to both the Archbishop of York and the Pope himself were forwarded, and despite the protests of the canons and their argument about the "illegality" of Gilbert's election (who appears to have been supported only by Michael, the archdeacon of Galloway), Gilbert secured consecration by Archbishop Walter de Gray at York on 2 September.

An investigation by Pope Gregory IX had already been started on 9 June, in which the Pope had issued a mandate to the Bishop of Rathlure, the Bishop of Raphoe, and the Archdeacon of Raphoe, authorising them to investigate the legality of Odo's election, and if they found it to have accorded with canon law, to consecrate him as Bishop of Galloway and compel Gilbert to restore everything he had taken; the results of this investigation are not known. Odo was still claiming the bishopric on 19 June 1241, but disappeared from the records after this date. It is not known when Odo died.

== Notes ==
Religious titles
Preceded by ?	Abbot of Dercongal fl. 1225	Succeeded by ? Next recorded abbot was Dungall (Dúnghall)
Preceded by Walter	Bishop of Galloway (elect); 1235–1241	Succeeded by Gilbert of Glenluce
