= Marcus Dods =

Marcus Dods may refer to:

- Marcus Dods (musician) (1918–1984), British musician and composer
- Marcus Dods (theologian born 1786) (1786–1838), Scottish minister and theological writer
- Marcus Dods (theologian born 1834) (1834–1909), Scottish divine and biblical scholar
