= Gilbert of Glenluce =

Cistercian monk, abbot, and bishop

Gilbert
- Bishop of Galloway
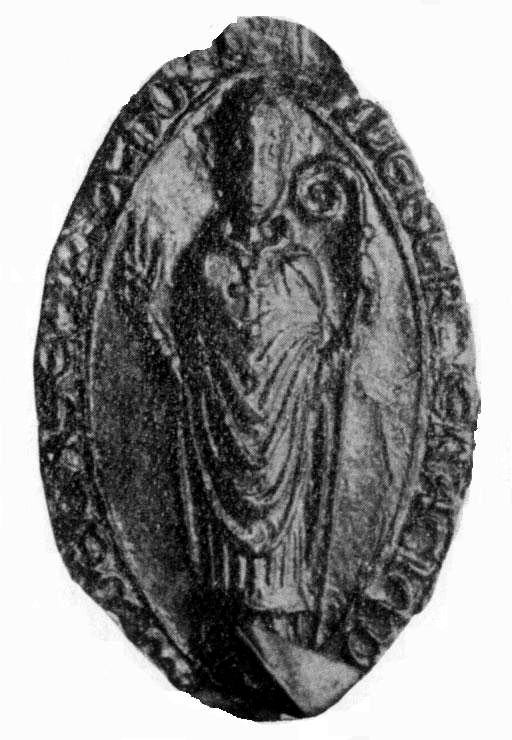
- Bishop Gilbert's seal
- Church: Roman Catholic Church
- See: Diocese of Galloway
- In office: 1235–1253
- Predecessor: Walter
- Successor: Henry of Holyrood
- Previous post: Abbot of Glenluce (resigned 1233)

Orders
- Consecration: 2 September 1235

Personal details
- Born: Probably late 12th century unknown
- Died: 1253

Gilbert (died 1253) was a 13th-century Cistercian monk, abbot and bishop. His first appearance in the sources occurs under the year 1233, for which year the Chronicle of Melrose reported that "Sir Gilbert, the abbot of Glenluce, resigned his office, in the chapter of Melrose; and there he made his profession". It is not clear why Gilbert really did resign the position of Abbot of Glenluce, head of Glenluce Abbey in Galloway, in order to become a mere brother at Melrose Abbey; nor is it clear for how long Gilbert had been abbot, though his latest known predecessor is attested last on 27 May 1222. After going to there, Gilbert became the Master of the Novices at Melrose.

The Melrose Chronicle tells us that "Sir Gilbert, master of the novices at Melrose, and formerly abbot of Glenluce, was elected bishop by the whole people and the clergy on Galloway, excepting the prior and the convent of Whithorn". This occurred on the first Sunday of Lent, i.e. on Sunday 25 February 1235. The Melrose Chronicle however, supportive of Gilbert and his election, failed to note the significance of those who did not elect him, as the "prior and convent" of Whithorn believed that they enjoyed the right of election, and it is not clear who in Galloway actually did support Gilbert's election except the Archdeacon of Galloway, Michael. The Prior of Whithorn and the canons of Whithorn Priory chose to elect, on 11 March, their own candidate, Odo Ydonc; the latter was himself a fellow Premonstratensian and canon of Whithorn, and was formerly Abbot of Dercongal.

The "election" of Gilbert was supported by King Alexander II of Scotland, who gave his assent to the election on 23 April. Richard Oram and other historians argue that Gilbert was actually forwarded by King Alexander, part of a general effort to impose "Scottish" [i.e. crown] control on Galloway in the aftermath of the annexation of the province following the death of Alan, Lord of Galloway, and amidst the Galwegian revolt of 1235 led by Gille Ruadh. There proceeded various appeals to both the Archbishop of York and the Pope himself; despite the protests of the canons and their argument about the "illegality" of Gilbert's election, Gilbert secured consecration by Archbishop Walter de Gray at York on 2 September. An investigation by Pope Gregory IX had already been started, on 9 June, in which the Pope had issued a mandate to the Bishop of Rathlure, the Bishop of Raphoe, and the Archdeacon of Raphoe, authorising them to investigate the legality of Odo's election, and if they found it to have accorded with canon law, to consecrate him as Bishop of Galloway and compel Gilbert to restore everything he had taken; the results of this investigation are unknown, and Gilbert retained his bishopric.

Gilbert's twelve-year episcopate left a few notices of his activity. He confirmed to Dryburgh Abbey the gift of the church of Sorbie granted by his predecessor Walter, amalgamating the two churches of Sobrie Minor and Sorbie Maior, and granting to that abbey the church of Borgue with provision for a vicar set aside. He was also active in England, particular in the Bishopric of Durham during vacancies in that bishopric, when Gilbert could perform episcopal functions there like granting indulgences and dedicating altars. He died in 1253, his obituary being noted by both the Melrose Chronicle and the Lanercost Chronicle.

== Notes ==
Religious titles
Preceded by John	Abbot of Glenluce; 1222 × 1233-1233	Succeeded by Robert
Preceded by Walter	Bishop of Galloway; 1235–1253	Succeeded by Henry of Holyrood
