= Clockwork universe =

Deterministic model of the universe

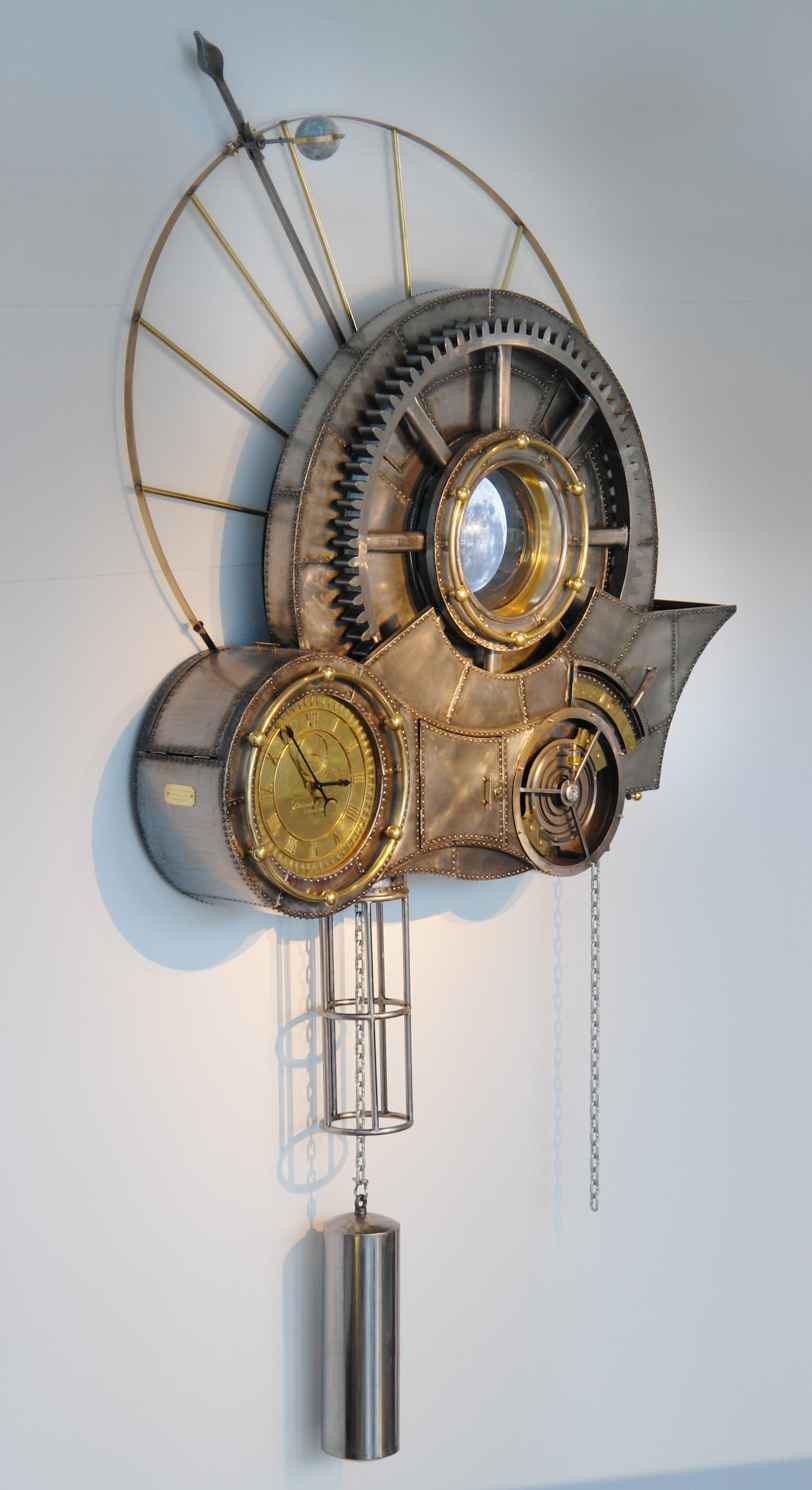
Tim Wetherell's Clockwork Universe sculpture at Questacon, Canberra, Australia (2009)

The clockwork universe is a concept which compares the universe to a mechanical clock. It continues ticking along, as a perfect machine, with its gears governed by the laws of physics, making every aspect of the machine predictable. It evolved during the Enlightenment in parallel with the emergence of Newton's laws governing motion and gravity.

== History ==
This idea was very popular among deists during the Enlightenment, when Isaac Newton derived his laws of motion, and showed that alongside the law of universal gravitation, they could predict the behaviour of both terrestrial objects and the Solar System.

A similar concept goes back to Johannes de Sacrobosco's early 13th-century introduction to astronomy: On the Sphere of the World. In this widely popular medieval text, Sacrobosco spoke of the universe as the machina mundi, the machine of the world, suggesting that the reported eclipse of the Sun at the crucifixion of Jesus was a disturbance of the order of that machine.

Responding to Gottfried Leibniz, a prominent supporter of the theory, in the Leibniz–Clarke correspondence, Samuel Clarke wrote:

The Notion of the World's being a great Machine, going on without the Interposition of God, as a Clock continues to go without the Assistance of a Clockmaker; is the Notion of Materialism and Fate, and tends, (under pretence of making God a Supra-mundane Intelligence,) to exclude Providence and God's Government in reality out of the World.

In 2009, artist Tim Wetherell created a wall piece for Questacon (The National Science and Technology centre in Canberra, Australia) representing the concept of the clockwork universe. This steel artwork contains moving gears, a working clock, and a movie of the lunar terminator.

== See also ==
- Mechanical philosophy
- Determinism
- Eternalism (philosophy of time)
- History of science
- Orrery
- Philosophy of space and time
- Superdeterminism
