= Kelvin House =

Kelvin House may refer to:

== United Kingdom ==
- Kelvin House, Bradford, West Yorkshire, England, part of Holme Wood housing estate
- Kelvin House, Carshalton, England, headquarters of the Institute of Refrigeration
- Kelvin House, Derby, England, part of Railway Technical Centre, former technical headquarters of the British Railways Board
- Kelvin House, Old Luce, a listed building in Old Luce, Dumfries and Galloway, Scotland
- Kelvin House, Paisley, a listed building in Paisley, Renfrewshire, Scotland
- Kelvin House, Ruislip, London, England, a former preparatory school founded by James Cameron Todd, named after Lord Kelvin

== Other places ==
- Kelvin House, Adelaide, a heritage-listed building in Adelaide, Australia, now known as Security House
- Kelvin House, St John's, a Second Empire style house in Rennie's Mill Road, St John's, Newfoundland and Labrador, Canada
