= Old Luce =

Coordinates: 54.878°N 4.811°W

- Location within Dumfries and Galloway
- Council area: Dumfries and Galloway
- Lieutenancy area: Wigtown
- Country: Scotland
- Sovereign state: United Kingdom
- Police: Scotland
- Fire: Scottish
- Ambulance: Scottish
- UK Parliament: Dumfries and Galloway
- Scottish Parliament: Galloway and Upper Nithsdale

Old Luce is a civil parish in Dumfries and Galloway, Scotland. It lies in the Machars peninsula, in the traditional county of Wigtownshire. The parish is around 10 miles (16 km) long and 8 miles (13 km) broad, and contains 40,350 acres (16,330 ha).

It was anciently named Glenluce which was divided in 1646 into two parts, the northern one named New Luce, and the southern one named Old Luce. In 1661 the two parishes of Old and New Luce were reunited for a time, and when the 1684 Wigtownshire Parish List was recorded, it listed both Old Luce and New Luce under “Glenluce Parish”. In 1688, after the Glorious Revolution, the separation of Old Luce and New Luce became permanent. Old Luce has a Community Council.

== Villages and places in Old Luce ==
The town of Glenluce and Glenluce Church are in Old Luce Parish, as is Glenluce Abbey. In 1846 in the Topographical Dictionary of Scotland, Samuel Lewis wrote that the village of Glenluce was situated upon the road leading from Newton Stewart to Stranraer. "The church, erected in 1814, is a commodious edifice, and situated close to the village. The members of the United Secession have a place of worship. There are several other schools, of which two are connected with dissenters, and one is supported by the Hay family."

Dunragit (Scottish Gaelic: Dùn Reicheit) is a village on the A75, between Stranraer and Glenluce in Old Luce. The place-name has been said to derive from Din Rheged meaning Fort of Rheged. This would refer to the Brythonic Dark Age kingdom of Rheged that seems to have existed somewhere in this area of the English/Scottish border between the 5th and 8th centuries. It is possible that this was one of the royal sites used by the kings of Rheged and it has been suggested as the site of the unidentified Northern Royal court Penrhyn Rhionedd, recorded in the Welsh Triads. There is a possible Roman cremation cemetery and two castle mottes in the village. The ex-King of Dublin and Man or Mann, Echmarcach mac Ragnaill, had the title Rex Innarenn ("King of the Rhinns") attributed to him on his death in 1065. The western sections of Galloway had been firmly aligned with the Isle of Man, and Norse and Gaelic-Norse settlement names from the 10th and 11th centuries are spread all along the coastal lands of south-western Scotland. Glenwhan Garden, has been created in Dunragit since 1979, and today is open to the public.

Carscreugh Castle (of Earl of Stair in 1782) was the home of Janet Dalrymple, on whom Sir Walter Scott based his heroine Lucy, the Bride of Lammermoor, (who became Lucia di Lammermoor in Donizetti's opera of the same name.) Janet fell in love with and secretly betrothed to a penniless local man, Archibald Rutherford. Her parents bitterly opposed this liaison and forced her to renounce her vow and marry another man from a wealthy local family, Sir David Dunbar of Baldoon Castle near Wigtown. However something dreadful happened on her wedding night which ended in her death and the wounding of her husband, who ever afterwards refused to divulge to anyone what had occurred that night.

== Archaeology ==
From Glenluce Sands there have been recovered "more objects of antiquity than from any area of similar extent in Scotland". The relics range from neolithic to mediaeval times.

St. John's Chapel at The Knock of Luce was at one time a chapel of St. John. The tenant, Mr. Wilson, told Rev. George Wilson of Glenluce that he removed three distinct paved floors, one above the other. This indicated a long occupation.

=== Forts and brochs ===
Rev. George Wilson of Glenluce, in his Archaeological and Historical Collections relating to Ayrshire and Galloway, relates that Wigtownshire contains about sixty forts; 15 in Mochrum, 4 in Glasserton, 10 in Whithorn, and several more in the other parishes not named in his list. He lists the following forts in Old Luce:

1. Three at Glenhinnie or Glenhinney hut circles, Dunragit Moor
2. Two at Glenwhan, Dunragit
3. Two in a wood called Baraigle near Dunragit
4. Roon Dounan, Dunragit House, north Dunragit Village A stone-built 5th-6th century fort of Rheged on a natural hillock of outcropping rock, 12–14 ft high with an 18 ft terrace on the west side.
5. Two on Craig, each with a hut circle. (Perhaps Old Hall of Craig at Airyhemming)
6. Three forts at Airyhemming, one with a cup-shaped floor at one end.
7. Stairhaven broch.
8. A fort 1/4 mile south of the pier shown on the O.S. map as a cairn.
9. Near Low Sunonness fort called Garliachen.
10. Ring on Mull of Sunonness. (perhaps Garliachen)
11. On Barhaskine at the Carlinwark.
12. Fortified town on Knock Hill. The Knock, Old Luce, or Knock of Luce or Knock Fell fort This ancient fortified village stands on the highest hill in Old Luce and may have been built by the makers of the extensive lake dwellings in Machermore Loch about 2 miles to the west. There was an outer defence at the west end on a lower shelving slope. It had an entrance gap of about 10 feet at each end, that at the south-western end appeared to have heavy defences, but the whole fort was dilapidated to build a dry stone wall along the south-side of the Fell. There were traces of 6 or 7 hut circles along the line of fortification and outside on a small flat space on the steep northern side (click on photo below) there was a half-circle of about 20 ft in diameter. Down the western-slope there was a cluster of small cairns, and a cluster of green hut circles.
13. Ring on Barnsallzie moor. Barnsallie Hut Circle
14. Circular fort at Drumearnachan (at Barlea or Barfad, Kirkcowan), not on O.S. map, but detailed on p. 56, vol.III.
15. Mouth of River Piltanton Corrylinn or Corachlinn.
16. High Torrs called Knockdoon.

Droughdool Mote or Mound, south Dunragit Village, has a base of 156 ft diameter, is 30 ft high with a level top of 40 ft diameter.

Dunragit henge between the Mound and Dunragit village is one of the most important Stone Age sites in Scotland. It is a pit defined cursus monument, dating from Neolithic and Bronze Age times. It was first discovered by aerial photography in 1992. Dunragit Excavations Project Archaeological excavation has revealed the remains of three massive concentric timber circles; the outer circle was 300m in diameter, almost six times the size of Stonehenge. Built around 2500 BC, this huge monument was a ceremonial centre and a meeting place for south-west Scotland's early farming communities.

=== Crannogs ===
Whitefield Loch has two crannogs: Dormans Island crannog of 250BC; and Tree Island crannog. The latter is now on dry land due to the fallen water level in the Loch. Whitefield is near Machermore, ancient castle of the MacDowall Clan.

== Gallery ==
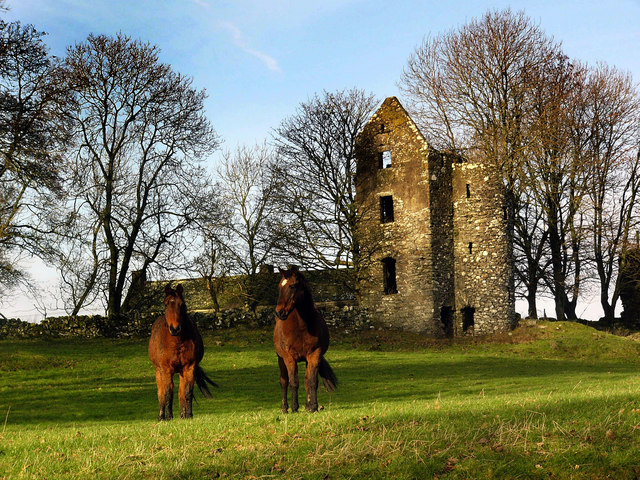
Carscreugh Castle

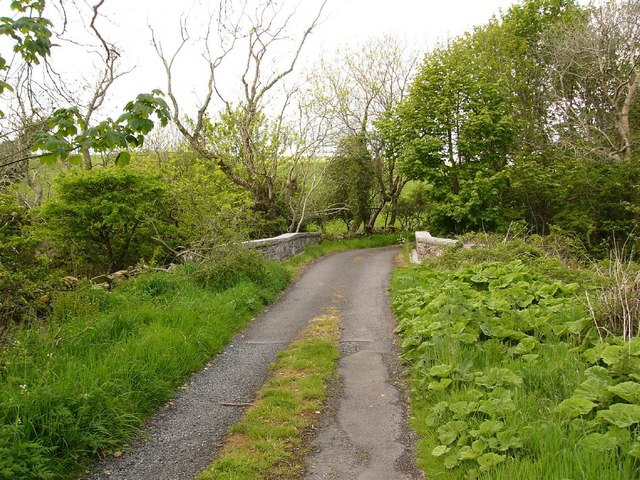
Milton Bridge near site of Kirkchrist chapel and well

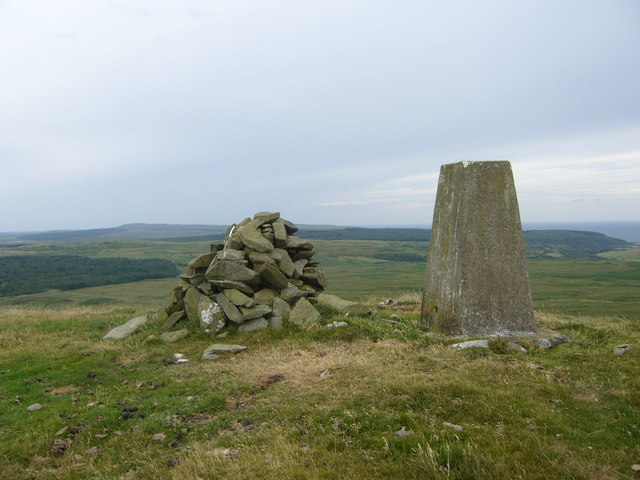
Knock Fell trig (Knock Hill Fort)

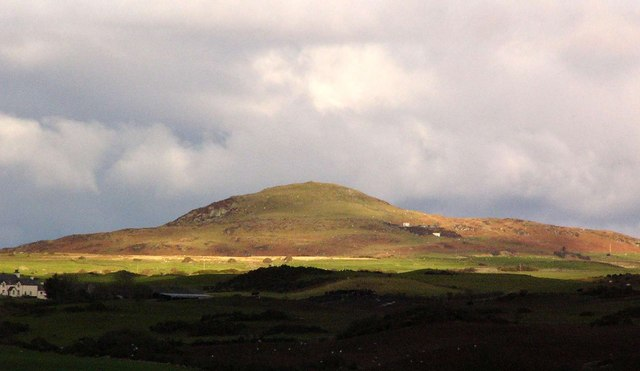
Knock of Luce (Knock Fell), view of Fort location from Mull of Sinniness

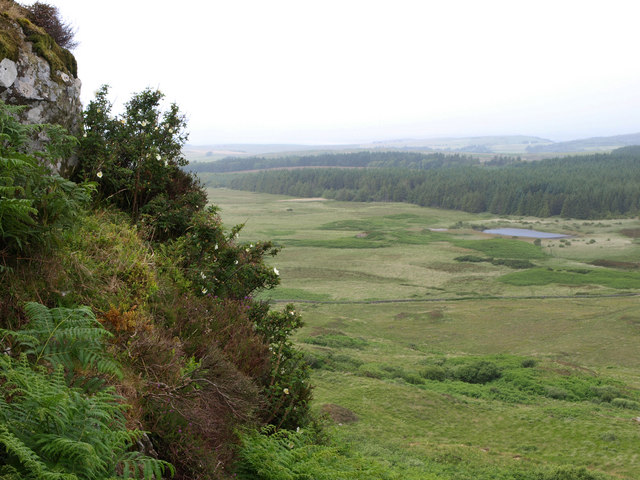
Knock of Luce ancient village fort. Rock face on steep northern slope

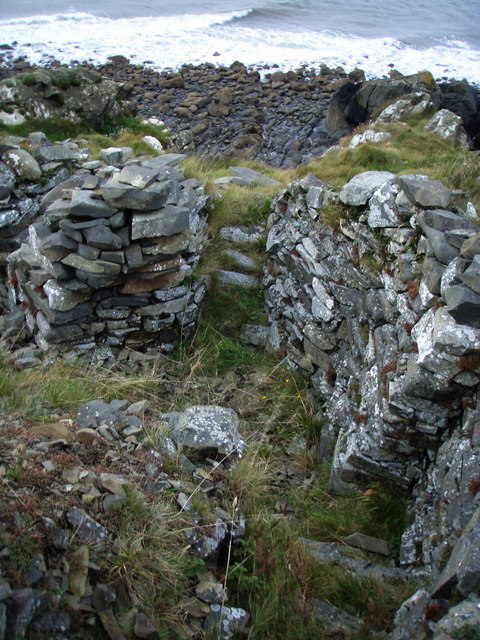
Stairhaven Iron-age broch - intramural stairs

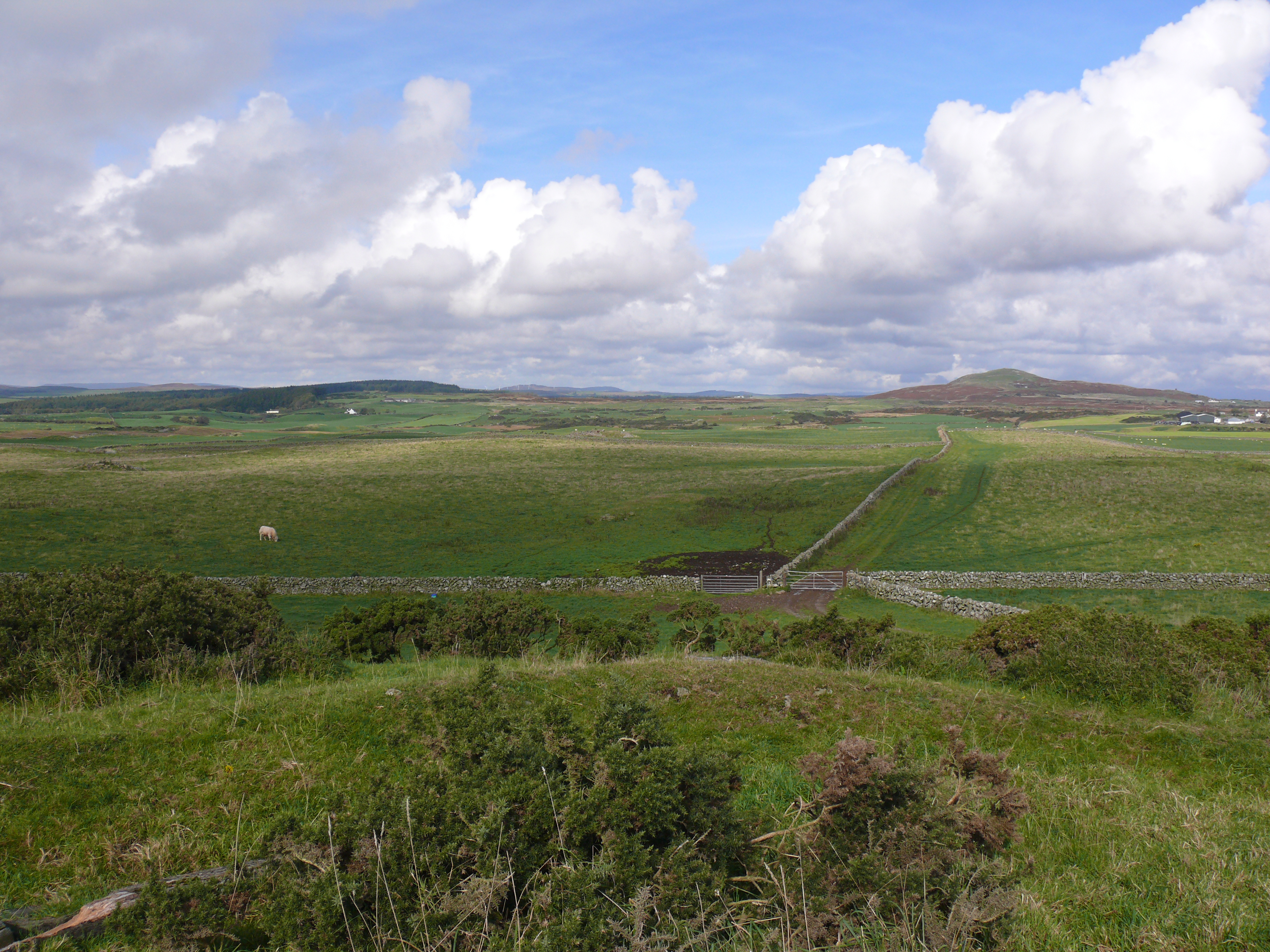
Black Cairn

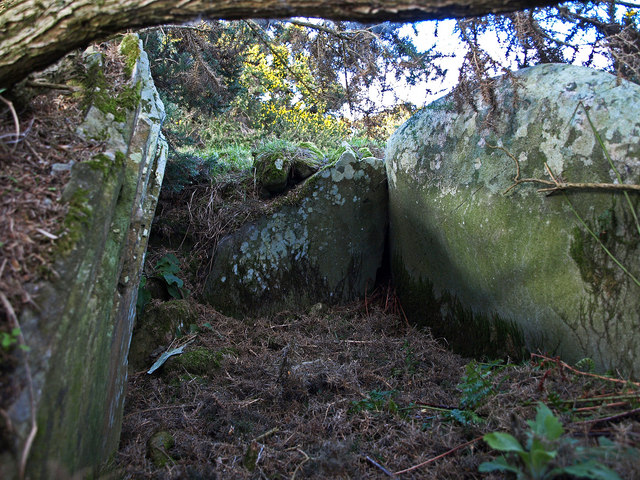
High Gillespie chambered cairn

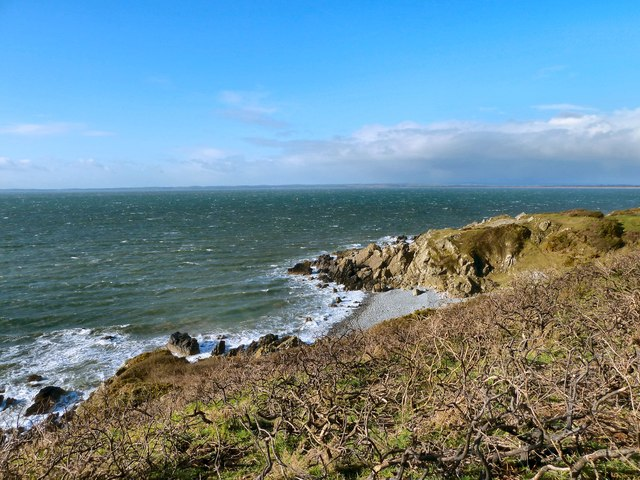
Garliachen Fort, Laigh Sinniness, Old Luce

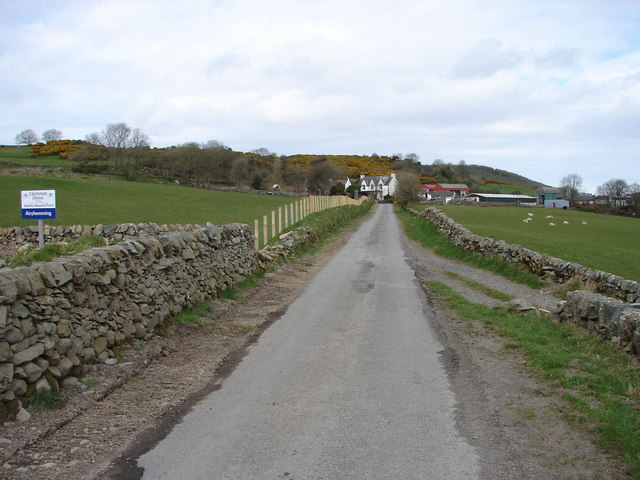
near 3 forts at Airyhemming (Arehemen)

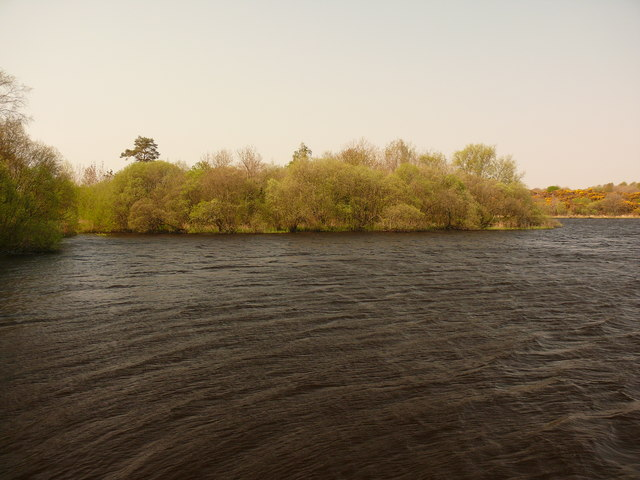
possibly Tree Island Crannog, Whitefield Loch - Machermore Loch

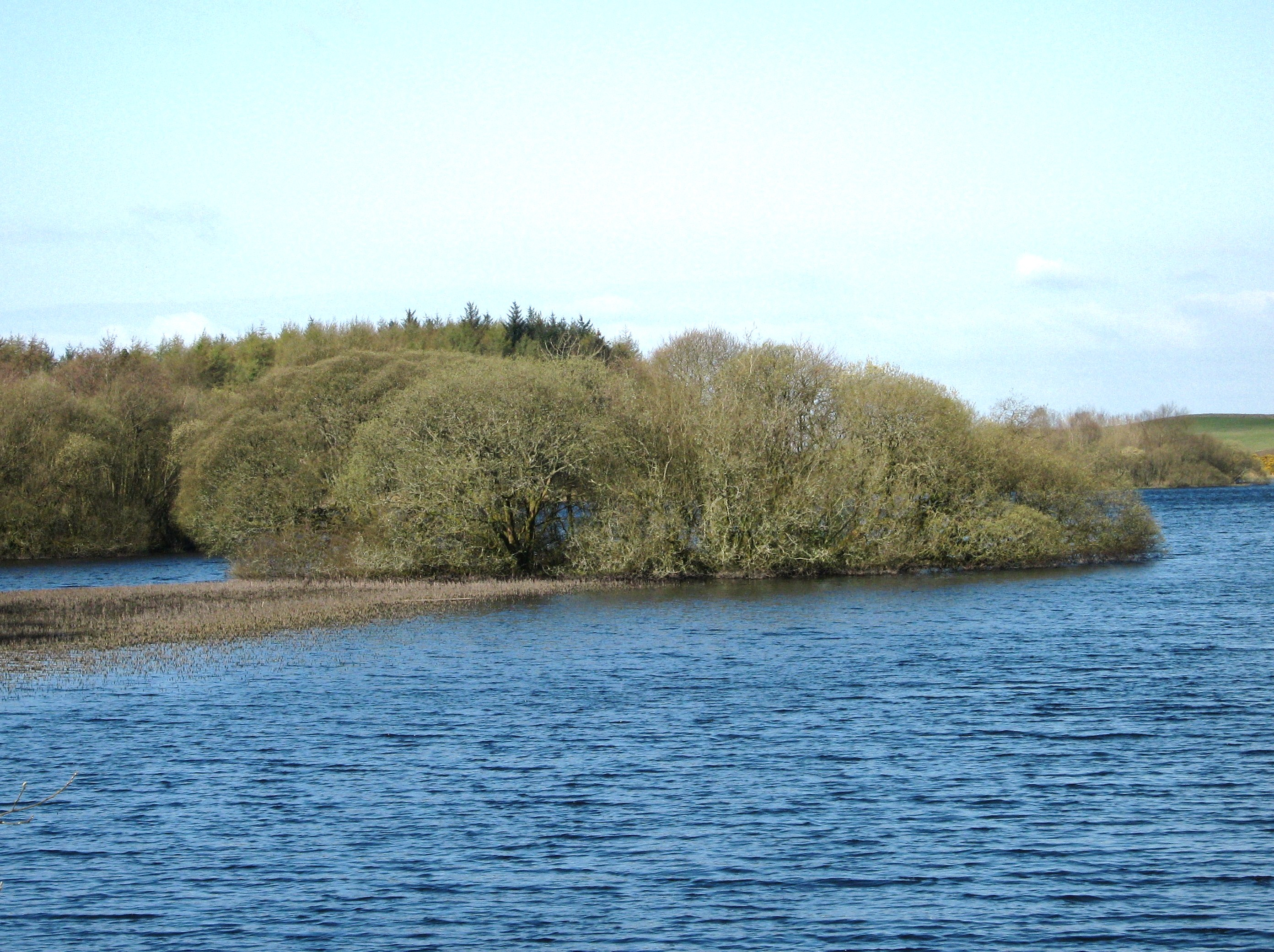
Dorman's Island Crannog, Whitefield Loch - Machermore Loch

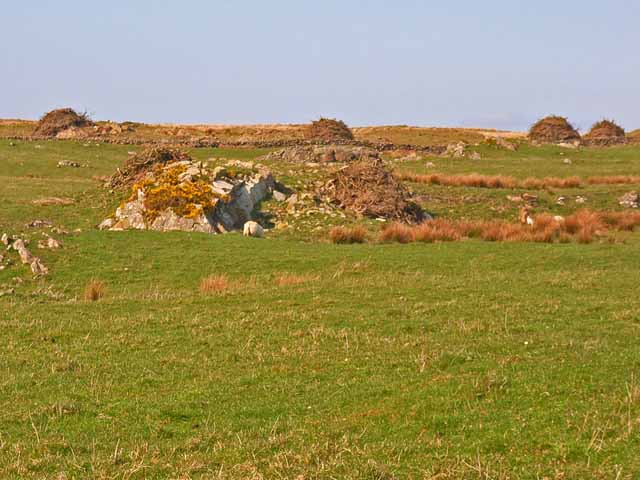
Machermore, Barony Glenluce, of Clan Macdowall

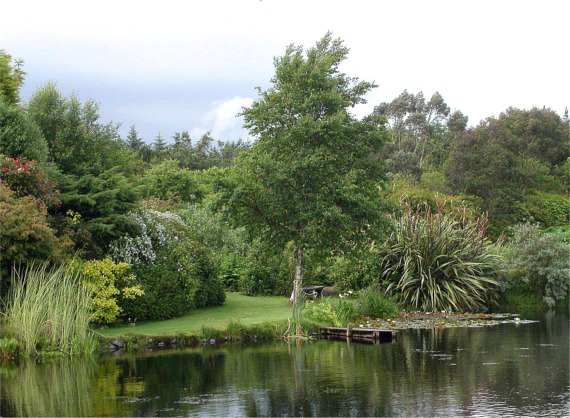
Glenwhan Garden in Dunragit

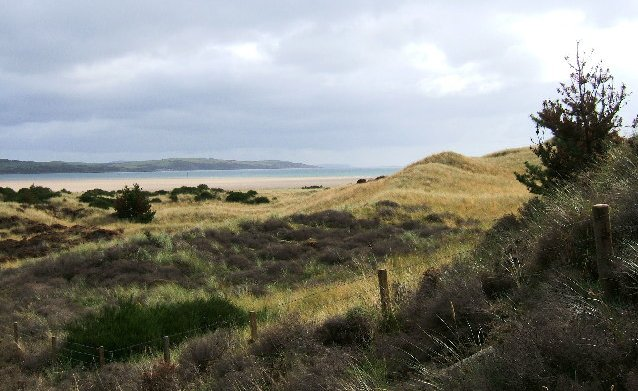
Ringadoo Point near Dunragit

== See also ==
- List of listed buildings in Old Luce, Dumfries and Galloway
