= Dunragit =

Coordinates: 54.879°N 4.885°W

Dunragit: Scottish Gaelic: Dùn Reicheit
- Location within Dumfries and Galloway
- OS grid reference: NX149576
- Council area: Dumfries and Galloway
- Lieutenancy area: Wigtown
- Country: Scotland
- Sovereign state: United Kingdom
- Police: Scotland
- Fire: Scottish
- Ambulance: Scottish
- UK Parliament: Dumfries and Galloway
- Scottish Parliament: Galloway and West Dumfries

Dunragit (Scottish Gaelic: Dùn Reicheit) is a village on the A75, between Stranraer and Glenluce in Dumfries and Galloway, south-west Scotland. Dunragit is within the parish of Old Luce, in the traditional county of Wigtownshire. The modern village grew up around the west gate of Dunragit House, an 18th-century country house, though there is evidence of Neolithic settlement in the area.

== Toponymy ==
The place-name Dunragit is said to derive from Din Rheged meaning "Fort of Rheged", referring to the Brythonic kingdom of Rheged which existed in northern Britain between the 5th and 8th centuries. RE

== Dunragit monument complex ==
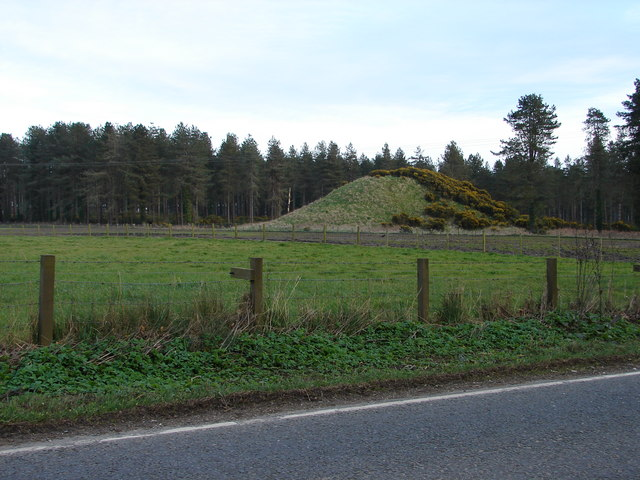
Droughduil Mote, identified as a Neolithic mound

Between 1999 and 2002, archeological excavations have explored the Dunragit area, and a complex of Neolithic monuments has been uncovered. Nothing can now be seen above ground, but aerial photography and excavation has revealed an early Neolithic cursus monument, and the remains of three later Neolithic concentric timber circles, dating to around 2500 BC; the outer circle of which was 300 metres (980 ft) in diameter. Around 400 metres (1,300 ft) south of the timber circles is the mound of Droughduil, which has been previously identified as a medieval motte. The location of the mound, aligned with one of the entrances to the timber circles, prompted speculation as to an earlier origin, and the 2002 excavation season focused on this feature. Optically stimulated luminescence dating of excavated material showed that the mound was constructed around 2500 BC, and has been compared to Silbury Hill in Wiltshire.

== Round Dounan ==
Round Dounan, in the grounds of Dunragit House, has been identified as a motte, shaped from a natural mound. It may have been a stone-built fort of the 5th or 6th century, and was identified as the "Fort of Rheged" by R. C. Reid in the 1950s.

== Glenwhan Garden ==
The 12-acre (49,000 m^{2}) Glenwhan Garden has been created in Dunragit, since 1979, out of a gorse and bracken covered hillside, inspired by the nearby Logan Botanic Garden and Tresco on the Isles of Scilly. It is open to the public.

== Economy ==
Dunragit Creamery was operated by Nestlé, but this is no longer in use.

== Bypass ==
Plans were put forward in 2006 for a 5.3-kilometre (3.3 mi) bypass to take the busy A75 around the south side of the village. A £17.13m contract for the work was awarded in February 2013. During construction work substantial finds of prehistoric artefacts were uncovered. These included Mesolithic lithic artefacts, Neolithic arrowheads, Bronze Age urns and bead necklaces including a 130-piece jet bead necklace the origin of which was traced to Whitby, North Yorkshire.

== Railways ==
There is a level crossing located on the Glasgow South Western Line on the section between Stranraer and Barrhill.

The Beeching cuts resulted in the closure of the Portpatrick Railway and the Castle Douglas and Dumfries Railway, collectively known as the Port Road in 1965. It serving the port in Stranraer and thus Larne as well as the Port of Belfast and Northern Ireland in general.

The station is closed along with the direct line from Stranraer via Dunragit to Glenluce onwards to Dumfries and Carlisle and the West Coast Main Line to London Euston. The same journey to Dumfries is now via Ayr and Kilmarnock.

== Gallery ==
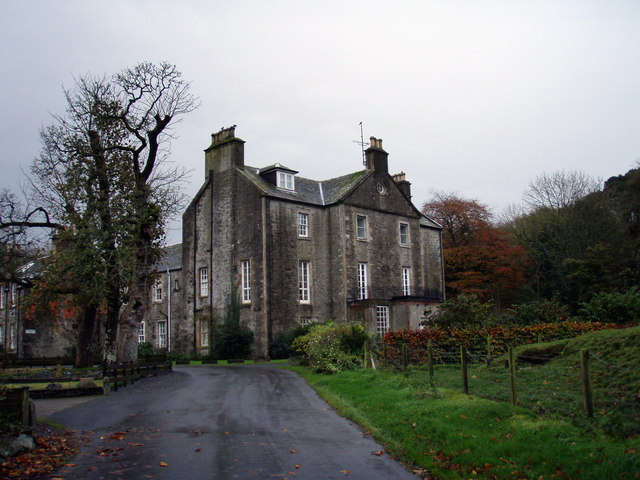
Dunragit House

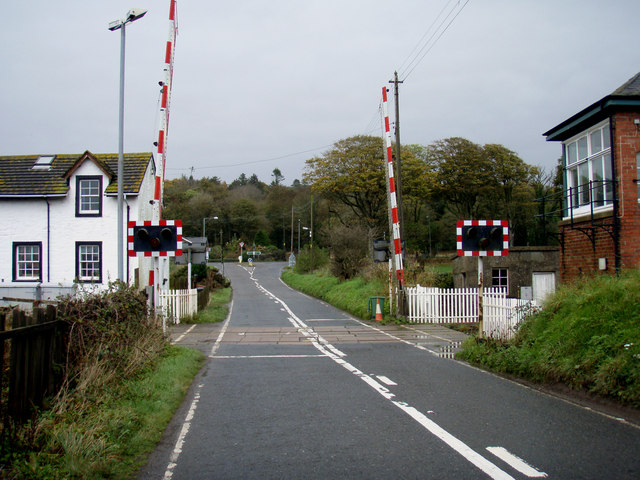
Level crossing at Dunragit

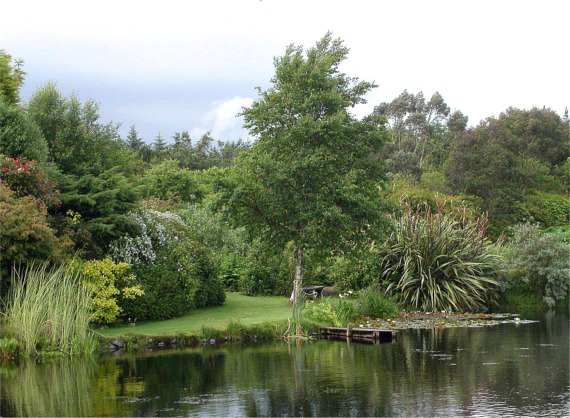
Glenwhan Garden

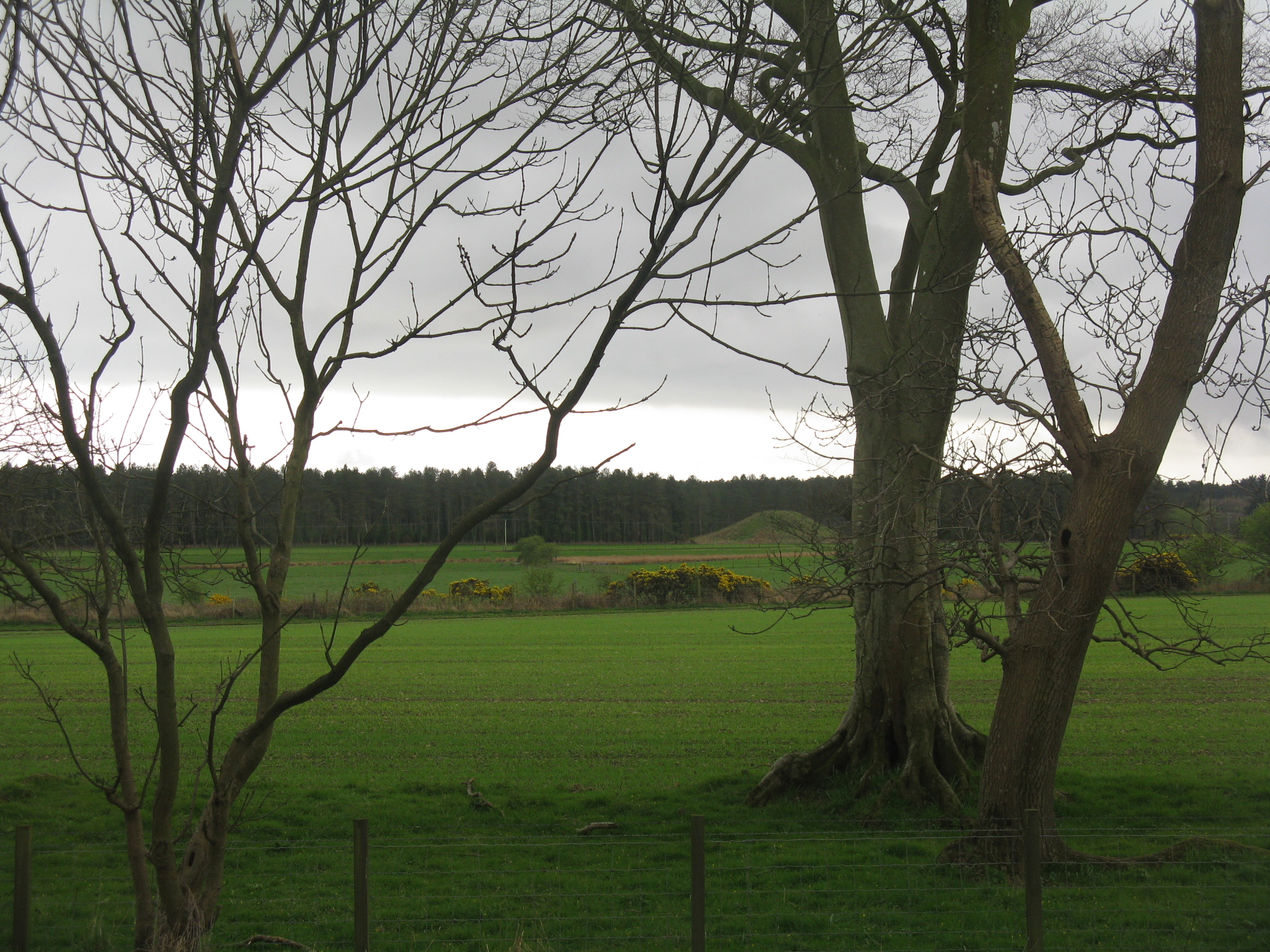
Looking south from Dunragit
