= George Wilson of Glenluce =

George Wilson of Glenluce FSAS (31 October 1823 – 18 February 1899) was a Scottish minister of the Free Church of Scotland who was also an antiquarian and archaeologist, remembered for his investigations at Old Luce.

== Life ==
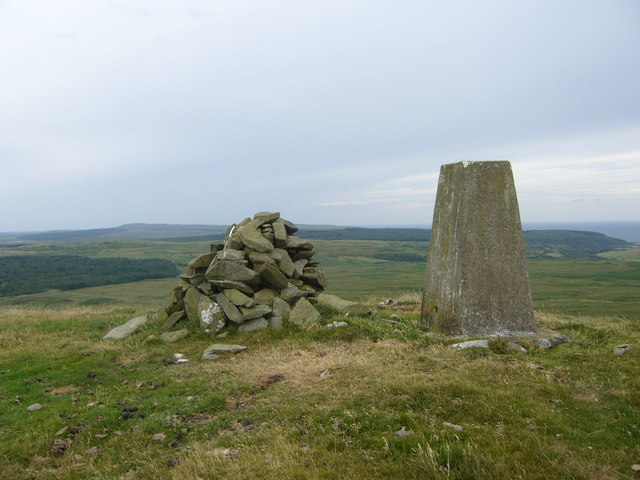
Knock Hill Fort and triangulation point, near Old Luce

He was born on 31 October 1823 at Edington Mains, a farm near Chirnside the son of Mary Steuart Todd and her husband, Abraham Wilson, a farmer. His father died during his first year, and the farm was taken over by his eldest brother, John Wilson, while he was still a teenager. He was educated at Chirnside parish school and the High School in Edinburgh.

After studying at the University of Edinburghhe trained as a minister for the Free Church of Scotland at New College, Edinburgh, spending one semester at the University of Berlin in Germany. He was licensed to preach by the Free Church of Scotland in January 1847.

He was ordained in November 1848 at Glenluce in south-west Scotland and remained there for the rest of his working life, but taking considerable interest in the history and archaeology of the area.

He retired to Edinburgh in 1895, being replaced at Glenluce by Alexander Kennedy Dallas.

He later relocated to Laret Burn at St Boswells in the Scottish Borders and died there on 18 February 1899. He is buried in the churchyard at Foulden. In his will, he left a large collection of archaeological finds and purchases to the Royal Scottish Museum.

== Memorials ==
In 1897 the congregation named the manse built for the incoming minister the "Wilson Memorial Manse" and in 1900 when the church transferred to the United Free Church of Scotland it was renamed the "Wilson Memorial United Free Church".

== Family ==
In September 1854 he married Mary Frances Dods (1825–1892), daughter of Marcus Dods (theologian born 1786) and sister of Marcus Dods (theologian born 1834). They met when he was a lodger at her father's house during his student days.

== Publications ==
- Archaeological and Historical Collections Relating to Ayrshire and Galloway
