= Vimin =

Scottish cleric and saint

Saint Vimin
- Born: Scotland
- Died: 579; Scotland
- Feast: 21 January

Saint Vimin (or Gwynnin, Vimianus, Viminus, Vimmin, Vinim, Vivian, Wynnia, Wynnin; died 579) was a Scottish abbot and bishop. He is said to have founded Holywood Abbey in Fife, Scotland. However, there are no reliable sources for his life. His feast day is 21 January.

== Name and heritage ==
The parish of Kirkgunzeon in southwest Scotland was called Kirkwynnin in 1200. William J. Watson (1865–1948) states that the name appears to combine kirk (church) with the Welsh form of Finnén, an affectionate name for Findbarr of Moyville, also called Findia. Findbarr's death was recorded in 579 as "quies Uinniani episcopi" (Bishop Uinniani died). The nearby Kylliemingan probably is Cill m'Fhinnéin, meaning "my Finnén's church."

== Monks of Ramsgate accounts ==
The monks of St Augustine's Abbey, Ramsgate wrote in their Book of Saints (1921),

Wynnin (St.) Bp. (Jan. 21)
(6th century) A Scottish Saint and missionary–Bishop, whose Liturgical cultus is proved from its insertion in the Aberdeen Breviary.

Vivian (St.) Bp. (Jan. 21)
(6th cent.) A Scottish Saint whose name is also written Vimmin or Vimian. He appears to have been Abbot of a monastery in Fife, and one tradition is that he was there consecrated Bishop. He died A.D. 579. Forbes’ Kalendar of Scottish Saints has some interesting details about him; but his whole history is confused. The Aberdeen Breviary gives the Liturgical Office for the Feast of Saint Vivian.

== Butler's account ==
The hagiographer Alban Butler (1710–1773) wrote in his Lives of the Fathers, Martyrs, and Other Principal Saints under January 21,

St. Vimin, or Vivian, B. C.

BY the fervent practices of the most perfect monastic discipline in one of the famous abbeys in Fifeshire, he qualified himself to become, by word and example, a guide and director to many chosen souls in the paths of evangelical perfection. This appeared in the fruits of his zealous preaching and labours, when he was raised to the abbatial, and soon after to the episcopal dignity; for at that time, very few bishoprics being erected in Scotland, it was customary for learned and holy abbots of great monasteries to be often consecrated bishops, and to be attended by their monks in performing their functions; as venerable Bede informs us, speaking of St. Aidan, (Note: Bede, Hist. l. 4. c. 17, &c.) St. Vimin, to shun the danger of vain glory, to which the reputation of many miracles which he had wrought exposed him, removed to a more solitary place, and there founded the abbey of Holywood, called in Latin Sacrum-boscum, in succeeding ages famous for many learned men; particularly the great mathematician, John à Sacro-bosco, in the thirteenth century. King places the death of St. Vimin in 615, but brings no proofs for dating it so high. The noble and very ancient family of Wemse, in Fifeshire, is said in Scotland to be of the same lineage with this saint. The ancient prayer in the Aberdeen Breviary on his festival, and other monuments, bear evidence to the great devotion of the ancient Scottish church to his memory. See Breviarium Aberdonense et Chronicon Skonense.

== Sources ==
- Butler, Alban (1868), The Lives of the Primitive Fathers, Martyrs, and Other Principal Saints, vol. I, Dublin: J. Duffy This article incorporates text from this source, which is in the public domain.
- Hutchison-Hall, Dr. John (Ellsworth) (2013), Orthodox Saints of the British Isles, vol. I January–March, St. Eadfrith Press, ISBN 9780615925806
- St. Augustine's Abbey, Ramsgate (1921), The Book of saints : a dictionary of servants of God canonized by the Catholic Church, London: A. & C. Black, ltd. This article incorporates text from this source, which is in the public domain.
- "Vimin (Wynnin, Gwynnin) Jan 21", Orthodox Europe, St John's Orthodox Church, Colchester
- Watson, W. J. (1926), The Celtic Place-Names of Scotland, Edinburgh and London, p. 165, archived from the original on 21 August 2014
