= John of Whithorn =

12th-century English clergyman

John of Whithorn (died 1209) was the medieval Bishop of Galloway. His first appearance as bishop-elect is at the coronation of Richard, Cœur de Lion as King of the English at Westminster Abbey on 3 September 1189. He was consecrated at Pipewell Abbey, Northamptonshire, on Sunday 17 September 1189.

The consecration was performed by the Archbishop of Dublin, the Archbishop of Trier, and the Bishop of Annaghdown, and took place despite the fact that there was a formal vacancy in the Archbishopric of York. Geoffrey Plantagenet was Archbishop-elect of York at the time, and John in fact ordained him as a priest, despite the opposition of the Archbishop of Canterbury, who wished to use the opportunity to force York to make obedience to Canterbury as Primate.

During his ten-year episcopate John appeared often in England as a suffragan of the Archbishop of York, for instance, accompanying the archbishop to a church council held by King Richard in 1191. In Scotland, he witnessed one charter of Alan of Galloway and was appointed a judge-delegate by the papacy in a patronage-related dispute in the diocese of Glasgow. He was believed to have become a canon at Holyrood Abbey in 1206. The Chronicle of Melrose reported his death under the year 1209.

== Notes ==
Religious titles
Preceded by Christian	Bishop of Galloway; 1189–1209	Succeeded by Walter
