= De sphaera mundi =

Book by Sacrobosco

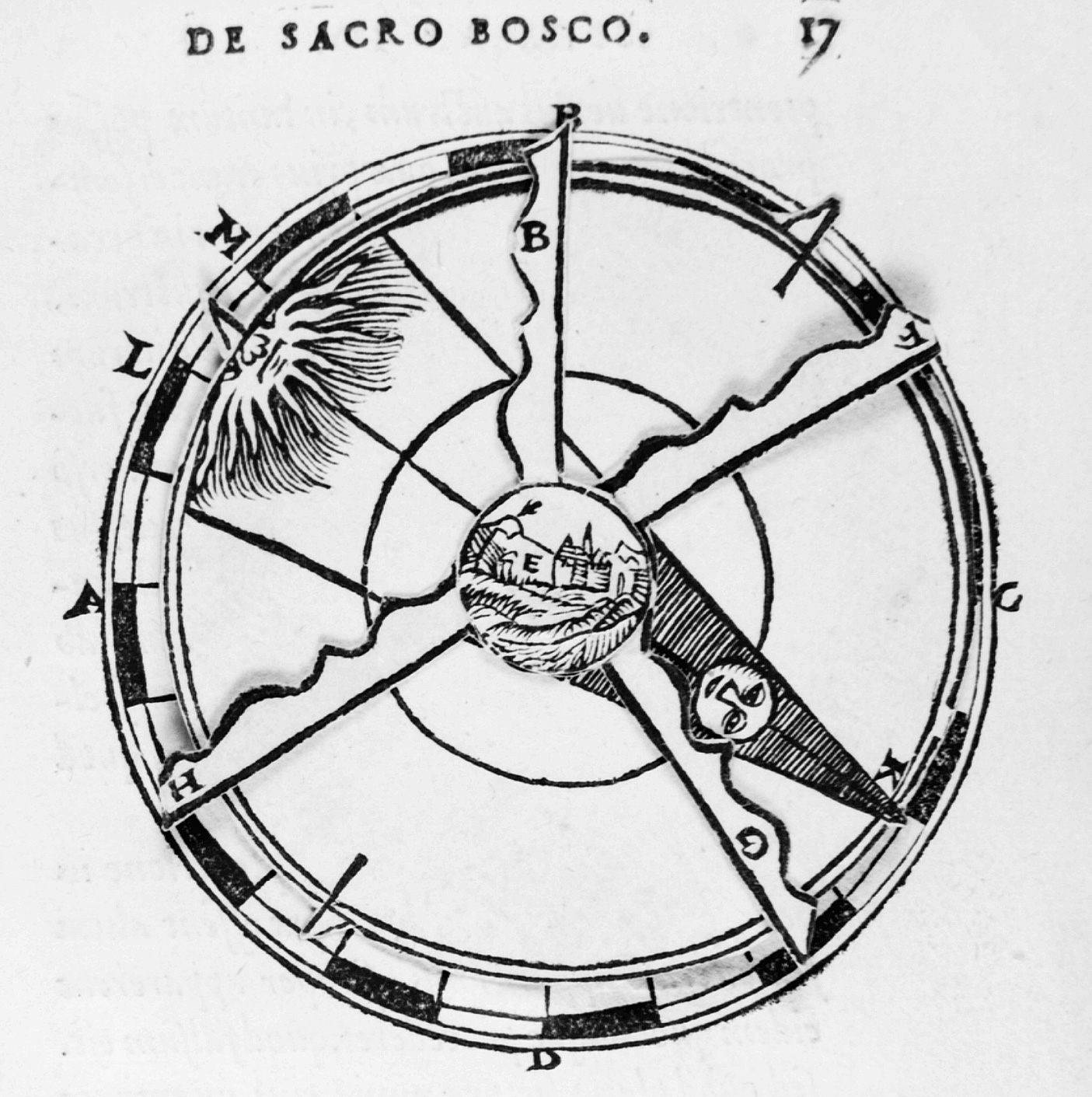
A volvelle from a sixteenth-century edition of Sacrobosco's De Sphaera

De sphaera mundi (Latin title meaning On the Sphere of the World, sometimes rendered The Sphere of the Cosmos; the Latin title is also given as Tractatus de sphaera, Textus de sphaera, or simply De sphaera) is a medieval introduction to the basic elements of astronomy written by Johannes de Sacrobosco (John of Holywood) c. 1230. Based heavily on Ptolemy's Almagest, and drawing additional ideas from Islamic astronomy, it was one of the most influential works of pre-Copernican astronomy in Europe.

== Reception ==
Sacrobosco's De sphaera mundi was the most successful of several competing thirteenth-century textbooks on this topic. It was used in universities for hundreds of years and the manuscript copied many times before the invention of the printing press; hundreds of manuscript copies have survived. The first printed edition appeared in 1472 in Ferrara, and at least 84 editions were printed in the next two hundred years. The work was frequently supplemented with commentaries on the original text. The number of copies and commentaries reflects its importance as a university text.

== Content ==
The 'sphere of the world' is not the earth but the heavens, and Sacrobosco quotes Theodosius saying it is a solid body. It is divided into nine parts: the "first moved" (primum mobile), the sphere of the fixed stars (the firmament), and the seven planets, Saturn, Jupiter, Mars, the sun, Venus, Mercury and the moon. There is a 'right' sphere and an oblique sphere: the right sphere is only observed by those at the equator (if there are such people), everyone else sees the oblique sphere. There are two movements: one of the heavens from east to west on its axis through the Arctic and Antarctic poles, the other of the inferior spheres at 23° in the opposite direction on their own axes.

The world, or universe, is divided into two parts: the elementary and the ethereal. The elementary consists of four parts: the earth, about which is water, then air, then fire, reaching up to the moon. Above this is the ethereal which is immutable and called the 'fifth essence' by the philosophers. All are mobile except heavy earth which is the center of the world.

=== The universe as a machine ===
Sacrobosco spoke of the universe as the machina mundi, the machine of the world, suggesting that the reported eclipse of the Sun at the crucifixion of Jesus was a disturbance of the order of that machine. This concept is similar to the clockwork universe analogy that became very popular centuries later, during the Enlightenment.

=== Spherical Earth ===
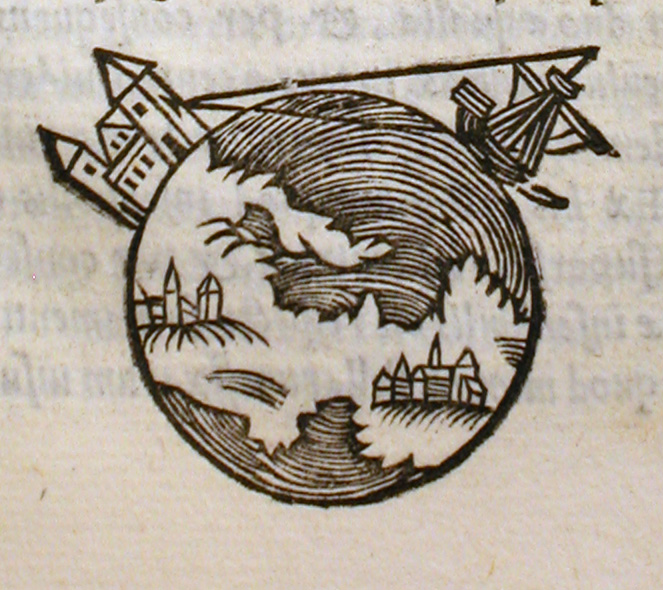
Picture from a 1550 edition of De sphaera, showing how the curvature of the Earth makes the mast of an approaching ship appear first

Though principally about the universe, De sphaera 1230 A.D. contains a clear description of the Earth as a sphere which agrees with widespread opinion in Europe during the higher Middle Ages, in contrast to statements of some 19th- and 20th-century historians that medieval scholars thought the Earth was flat. As evidence for the Earth being a sphere, in Chapter One he cites the observation that stars rise and set sooner for those in the east ("Orientals"), and lunar eclipses happen earlier; that stars near the North Pole are visible to those further north and those in the south can see different ones; that at sea one can see further by climbing up the mast; and that water seeks its natural shape which is round, as a drop.

== See also ==
- Armillary sphere
- Orrery

== Sources ==
- Pedersen, Olaf (1975). Gingerich, Owen; Dobrzycki, Jerzy (eds.). "The Corpus Astronomicum and the Traditions of Medieval Latin Astronomy: A Tentative Interpretation". Colloquia Copernicana III. Wrocław: Ossolineum: 59–76.
- Thorndike, Lynn (1949). The Sphere of Sacrobosco and its Commentators. Corpus of mediaeval scientific texts sponsored jointly by the Mediaeval Academy of America and the University of Chicago; v. 2. Chicago: Univ. of Chicago Press. hdl:2027/mdp.39015025028716.
