= List of listed buildings in Old Luce, Dumfries and Galloway =

This is a list of listed buildings in the civil parish of Old Luce in Dumfries and Galloway, Scotland.

== List ==
Name	Location	Date Listed	Grid Ref. (Note: Sometimes known as OSGB36, the grid reference (where provided) is based on the British national grid reference system used by the Ordnance Survey. • "Guide to National Grid". Ordnance Survey. • "Get-a-map". Ordnance Survey.)	Geo-coordinates	Notes	LB Number (Note: Historic Environment Scotland assign a unique alphanumeric identifier to each designated site in Scotland, for listed buildings this always begins with "LB", for example "LB12345".)	Image
Glenluce, Ladyburn Masonic Temple, (Former Ladyburn Church), With Railings And Gates				54°52′42″N 4°48′37″W	Category C(S)	19324	Upload Photo
Glenluce, 17 Main Street				54°52′42″N 4°48′42″W	Category B	19327	Upload Photo
Glenluce, 141 And 143 Main Street, Minn Cree And Woodbank, With Garden Walls				54°52′54″N 4°48′12″W	Category C(S)	19340	Upload Photo
Glenluce, 62 And 64 Main Street, Fernlea And Roseneath				54°52′47″N 4°48′32″W	Category C(S)	19357	Upload Photo
Glenluce, 72 Main Street				54°52′49″N 4°48′30″W	Category C(S)	19360	Upload Photo
Grennan, Farmhouse, Steading, Sundial And Boundary Walls				54°55′00″N 4°44′46″W	Category C(S)	19366	Upload Photo
North Milton, Farmhouse And Steading				54°51′11″N 4°46′50″W	Category B	19368	Upload Photo
Drochduil School And Schoolhouse				54°52′19″N 4°52′51″W	Category C(S)	16764	Upload Photo
Dunragit, The Kennels				54°53′11″N 4°53′12″W	Category C(S)	16767	Upload Photo
Glenluce, 7 Church Street, Kirkton				54°52′44″N 4°48′47″W	Category C(S)	16791	Upload Photo
Glenluce, 35-39 (Odd Nos) Main Street				54°52′44″N 4°48′38″W	Category C(S)	19332	Upload Photo
Glenluce, 53 Main Street, Kelvin House Hotel				54°52′46″N 4°48′36″W	Category C(S)	19336	Upload Photo
Glenluce, 16 And 18 Main Street				54°52′42″N 4°48′41″W	Category C(S)	19345	Upload Photo
Glenluce, 76 Main Street				54°52′49″N 4°48′28″W	Category B	19361	Upload Photo
Laigh Sinniness, Former Farmhouse And Steading				54°50′06″N 4°46′39″W	Category C(S)	19367	Upload Photo
Glenluce, Ladyburn Manse				54°52′52″N 4°48′07″W	Category C(S)	19323	Upload Photo
Glenluce, 61 Main Street				54°52′47″N 4°48′35″W	Category C(S)	19339	Upload Photo
Glenluce, 161 And 163 Main Street, Beechgrove And Ravenswood, With Railings				54°52′53″N 4°48′01″W	Category C(S)	19341	Upload Photo
Glenluce, 34 Main Street				54°52′45″N 4°48′35″W	Category C(S)	19352	Upload Photo
Glenluce, 36 Main Street, Crown Hotel				54°52′45″N 4°48′35″W	Category C(S)	19353	Upload Photo
Glenluce, 38 Main Street, Rowantree				54°52′45″N 4°48′35″W	Category B	19354	Upload Photo
Glenluce, Millbank And Cottage				54°52′51″N 4°47′50″W	Category B	19362	Upload Photo
Castle Of Park				54°52′34″N 4°49′32″W	Category A	16761	Upload Photo
Craigenveoch				54°52′03″N 4°44′49″W	Category C(S)	16762	Upload Photo
Auchenmalg, Auchenbrae, With Boundary Walls				54°50′20″N 4°45′11″W	Category C(S)	16781	Upload Photo
Bridge Of Park				54°52′41″N 4°49′14″W	Category B	16784	Upload Photo
Dunragit Home Farm, Sundial				54°53′03″N 4°53′17″W	Category C(S)	16785	Upload Photo
Glenluce, 28A Main Street				54°52′44″N 4°48′37″W	Category C(S)	19349	Upload Photo
Glenluce, War Memorial				54°52′51″N 4°48′19″W	Category C(S)	19365	Upload Photo
Carscreugh Castle				54°54′07″N 4°46′21″W	Category B	16759	Upload Photo
Carscreugh Castle, Cottages				54°54′08″N 4°46′23″W	Category C(S)	16760	Upload Photo
Culroy, Farm Building				54°51′00″N 4°43′22″W	Category B	16763	Upload Photo
Dunragit, East Lodge				54°52′44″N 4°53′22″W	Category B	16765	Upload Photo
Bridge, Lady Burn				54°52′22″N 4°48′56″W	Category C(S)	16783	Upload Photo
Genoch Doocot				54°52′03″N 4°54′27″W	Category B	16787	Upload Photo
Glenluce, 31 Main Street, King's Arms Hotel				54°52′44″N 4°48′40″W	Category C(S)	19331	Upload Photo
Glenluce, 47 Main Street, Ardville				54°52′45″N 4°48′37″W	Category C(S)	19335	Upload Photo
Glenluce, 57 And 59 Main Street				54°52′47″N 4°48′35″W	Category C(S)	19338	Upload Photo
Glenluce, 2 Main Street, With Railings				54°52′40″N 4°48′45″W	Category C(S)	19343	Upload Photo
Glenluce, 20 Main Street				54°52′42″N 4°48′40″W	Category C(S)	19346	Upload Photo
Glenluce, 30 Main Street, With Railings				54°52′44″N 4°48′37″W	Category B	19350	Upload Photo
Glenluce, 32 Main Street				54°52′44″N 4°48′36″W	Category C(S)	19351	Upload Photo
Glenluce, 52 And 54 Main Street				54°52′46″N 4°48′34″W	Category C(S)	19355	Upload Photo
Glenluce, 1A Sun Street				54°52′45″N 4°48′47″W	Category C(S)	19364	Upload Photo
Abbey House With Boundary Walls				54°53′24″N 4°49′56″W	Category B	16780	Upload Photo
Gillespie, Farmhouse And Steading				54°49′56″N 4°43′31″W	Category C(S)	16789	Upload Photo
Glenluce, 19 Main Street, Royal Bank Of Scotland				54°52′42″N 4°48′42″W	Category B	19328	Upload Photo
Glenluce, 22 Main Street, Public Hall				54°52′43″N 4°48′38″W	Category C(S)	19347	Upload Photo
Glenluce, North Street, Bridge				54°52′53″N 4°48′29″W	Category C(S)	19363	Upload Photo
Old Luce Church, Graveyard, Graveyard Walls, Gatepiers And Gates				54°52′44″N 4°48′43″W	Category B	19369	Upload Photo
Glenluce, Ladyburn Bridge				54°52′40″N 4°48′39″W	Category C(S)	19322	Upload Photo
Glenluce, 43 And 45 Main Street				54°52′45″N 4°48′37″W	Category B	19334	Upload Photo
Glenluce, 12 Main Street				54°52′41″N 4°48′42″W	Category C(S)	19344	Upload Photo
Stair Haven, Store				54°50′45″N 4°47′26″W	Category B	19371	Upload Photo
Dunragit, Signal Box				54°52′39″N 4°53′16″W	Category C(S)	16766	Upload another image
Auchenmalg, Castle Daly Hotel, (Former School And Schoolhouse), With Boundary Walls				54°50′21″N 4°45′09″W	Category B	16782	Upload Photo
Dunragit House				54°53′03″N 4°53′10″W	Category B	16786	Upload Photo
Glenluce, Church Street, Bridge				54°52′46″N 4°48′52″W	Category C(S)	16790	Upload Photo
Glenluce, 55 Main Street				54°52′46″N 4°48′36″W	Category C(S)	19337	Upload Photo
Glenluce, 165 Main Street, Navarre, With Railings				54°52′53″N 4°47′59″W	Category C(S)	19342	Upload Photo
Glenluce, 24 Main Street, Otterburn				54°52′43″N 4°48′38″W	Category C(S)	19348	Upload Photo
Piltanton Bridge				54°52′08″N 4°53′30″W	Category C(S)	19370	Upload Photo

== Key ==
The scheme for classifying buildings in Scotland is:

- Category A: "buildings of national or international importance, either architectural or historic; or fine, little-altered examples of some particular period, style or building type."
- Category B: "buildings of regional or more than local importance; or major examples of some particular period, style or building type, which may have been altered."
- Category C: "buildings of local importance; lesser examples of any period, style, or building type, as originally constructed or moderately altered; and simple traditional buildings which group well with other listed buildings."

In March 2016 there were 47,288 listed buildings in Scotland. Of these, 8% were Category A, and 50% were Category B, with the remaining 42% being Category C.
