= Marcus Dods (theologian born 1834) =

British churchman and biblical scholar (1834–1909)

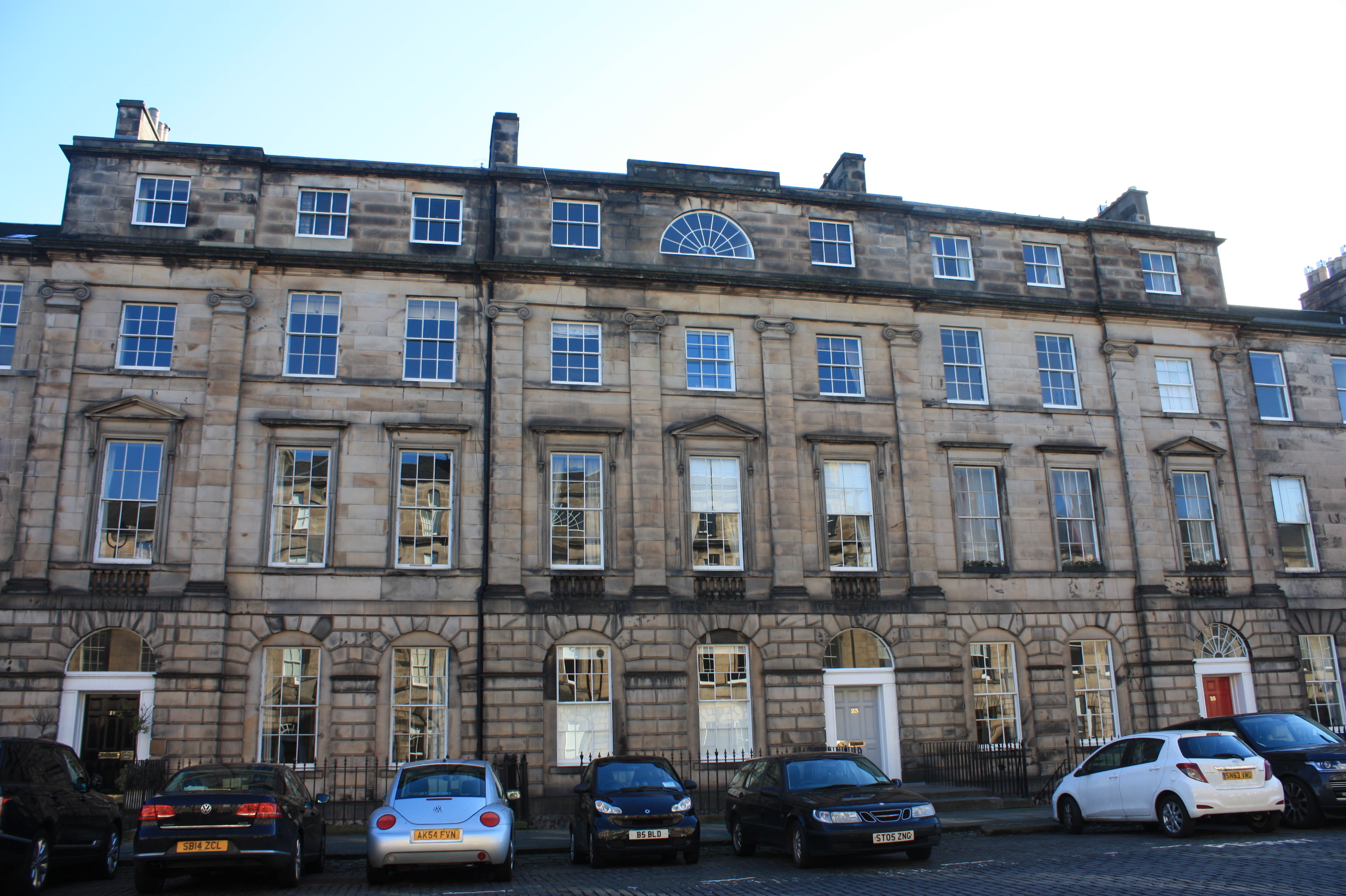
Dods' Edinburgh townhouse at 23 Great King Street, Edinburgh (centre)

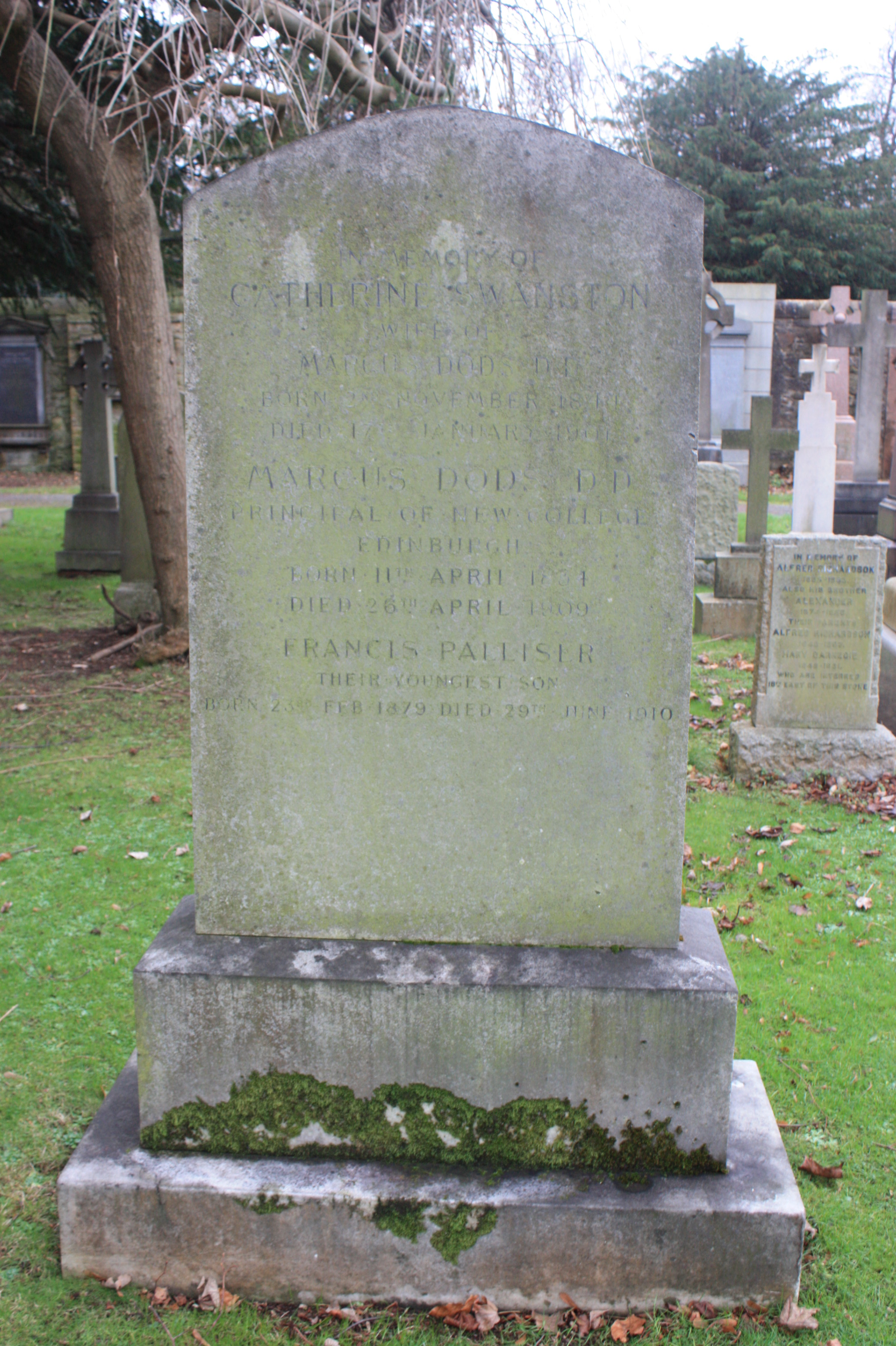
The grave of Marcus Dods, Dean Cemetery, Edinburgh

Marcus Dods (11 April 1834 – 26 April 1909) was a Scottish divine and controversial biblical scholar. He was a minister of the Free Church of Scotland. He served as Principal of New College, Edinburgh.

== Life ==
He was born at Belford, Northumberland, the youngest son of Rev Marcus Dods, a minister of the Church of Scotland and his wife, Sarah Pallister.

He attended Edinburgh Academy and then studied divinity at Edinburgh University, graduating in 1854 and being licensed in 1858. He had a difficult probationary period, being refused by 23 churches. In 1864 he became minister of Renfield Free Church, Glasgow, where he worked for twenty-five years. In 1889 he was appointed professor of New Testament Exegesis in the New College, Edinburgh, of which he became principal on the death of Robert Rainy in May 1907.

He became part of the United Free Church of Scotland on its formation in 1900, and in 1901 was elected Moderator of its General Assembly in 1902. He declined the position, stating that "he cannot see his way to undertake the duties". It was assumed he felt that being a neutral moderator, he would not be able to express his opinions on certain doctrinal points due to be discussed.

In later life he lived with his children and grandchildren in a huge Georgian townhouse, 23 Great King Street, in Edinburgh's Second New Town.

In spring of 1907 he filled in for Rev Robert James Drummond preaching at Lothian Road UF Church while the Drummonds visited the Holy Land.

On 26 April 1909, he died in Edinburgh. He was buried in the Dean Cemetery. The grave lies in the eastern part of the original north extension. He is buried with his wife and youngest son, Francis Palliser Dods (1879-1910).

== Family ==
In 1871, he married Catherine Swanston (1844-1901), daughter of James Swanston. They had three sons and one daughter. Their eldest son, an advocate, was also named Marcus Dods.

His sister Mary Frances Dods married the antiquarian Rev George Wilson of Glenluce.

== Works ==
Throughout his life, both ministerial and professorial, he devoted much time to the publication of theological books. Several of his writings, especially a sermon on Inspiration delivered in 1878, incurred the charge of unorthodoxy, and shortly before his election to the Edinburgh professorship he was summoned before the General Assembly of the Free Church of Scotland, but the charge was dropped by a large majority, and in 1891 he received the honorary degree of DD from Edinburgh University.

He edited Johann Peter Lange's Life of Christ in English (Edinburgh, 1864, 6 vols.), Augustine's works (1872–1876), and, with Alexander Whyte, Clark's Handbooks for Bible Classes series. In the Expositors Bible series he edited Genesis and 1 Corinthians, and he was also a contributor to the 9th edition of the Encyclopædia Britannica and Hastings' Dictionary of the Bible. He published a translation of Augustine's City of God in 1871.

Among other important works are:

- The Epistle to the Seven Churches (1865)
- An Introduction to the New Testament
- Israel's Iron Age (1874)
- Mohammed, Buddha and Christ (1877)
- Handbook on Haggai, Zechariah and Malachi (1879)
- The Gospel according to St John and Hebrews (1897), in the Expositors Greek Testament, Robertson Nicoll Editor, New York, n.d. St. John in Vol 1, p. 7, and Hebrews in Vol 4, p. 9. cited as author
- The Parables of Our Lord (1895)
- Forerunners of Dante
- How to Become Like Christ (1897), Available from Gutenberg
- The Bible, its Origin and Nature (1904)
- the Bross Lectures, in which he gave an able sketch of the use of Old Testament criticism, and finally set forth his Theory of Inspiration.

Apart from his services to Biblical scholarship he takes high rank among those who have sought to bring the results of technical criticism within the reach of the ordinary reader.

== Sources ==
- W. F. Gray, rev. Michael Jinkins. "Dods, Marcus (1834–1909)". Oxford Dictionary of National Biography (online ed.). Oxford University Press. doi:10.1093/ref:odnb/32850. (Subscription, Wikipedia Library access or UK public library membership required.)
