= Newton's law =

Newton's law may refer to:

- Newton's laws of motion
- Newton's law of universal gravitation
- Newton's law of cooling
- Newton's constitutive law for a Newtonian fluid
- Newton's Law (TV series)
