= Walter of Whithorn =

Bishop of Galloway (d. 1235)

Walter (died 1235) was Chamberlain of Alan, Lord of Galloway and later Bishop of Galloway. As Alan's chamberlain, he succeeded Bishop John after the latter's death, in 1209. His election coincided with the northern expedition of King John of England to secure the submission of King William of Scotland; Alan enjoyed friendly relations with the English king, the latter wishing to make use of Alan's manpower and naval resources, and so the election of Walter may have had something to do with King John.

Walter was consecrated by 2 November 1214. He appears in some records in England, as a suffragan of the Archbishop of York, witnesses a grant to Melrose Abbey during the reign of Alexander II of Scotland and granted to Dryburgh Abbey the parish church of Sorbie. His obituary in 1235 is noted in the Melrose Chronicle; he seems to have died in either January or February of that year.

An excavation of Whithorn Priory during 1957-67 uncovered the remains of various senior ecclesiastical figures whose identities were not known at the time. Research funded by Historic Scotland in 2007 led to the identification of six bishops from the bones and artefacts in the graves, Bishop Walter amongst them. The techniques employed allowed the researchers to conclude that the clerics enjoyed a diet of quality meat and fish.

== Notes ==
Religious titles
Preceded by John	Bishop of Galloway; 1209–1235	Succeeded by Gilbert
