= Marcus Dods (theologian born 1786) =

Scottish minister and theological writer

Marcus Dods, D.D. (1786–1838) was a Scottish minister and theological writer.

== Life ==
Dods was born near Gifford in East Lothian, on 7 December 1786.

He was educated at Edinburgh University. In 1810 he was ordained as a minister of the Church of Scotland at Belford, Northumberland, where he remained for the rest of his life. A monument to Dods erected at Belford bore an inscription written by Rev Prof James MacLagan D.D.

== Works ==
A leading contributor to the Edinburgh Christian Instructor under the editorship of Andrew Mitchell Thomson, he wrote a critique on the views of Edward Irving on the incarnation of Christ (January 1830). Irving wrote a letter to Dods, stating that he had not read his paper, but inviting him to correspond with him on the subject. Dods published his views at length in a work entitled On the Incarnation of the Eternal Word, the second edition of which appeared after his death with a recommendatory notice by Thomas Chalmers. Other works include:

- Anglicanus Scotched

== Family ==
He was married to Sarah Palliser (d.1859). They were parents to Marcus Dods.

His daughter Mary Frances Dods (1825-1892) married Rev George Wilson of Glenluce (1823-1899) a noted archaeologist.
