= Glenluce railway station =

Former railway station in Scotland

Glenluce

General information
- Location: Glenluce, Dumfries and Galloway; Scotland
- Coordinates: 54.8805°N 4.8097°W

Other information
- Status: Disused

History
- Original company: Portpatrick and Wigtownshire Joint Railway
- Pre-grouping: Portpatrick and Wigtownshire Joint Railway
- Post-grouping: London, Midland and Scottish Railway; Scottish Region of British Railways

Key dates
- 1862: opened
- 14 June 1965: closed
Location

Glenluce station was a station open in 1862 on the former Port Road that was constructed on the Portpatrick and Wigtownshire Joint Railway.

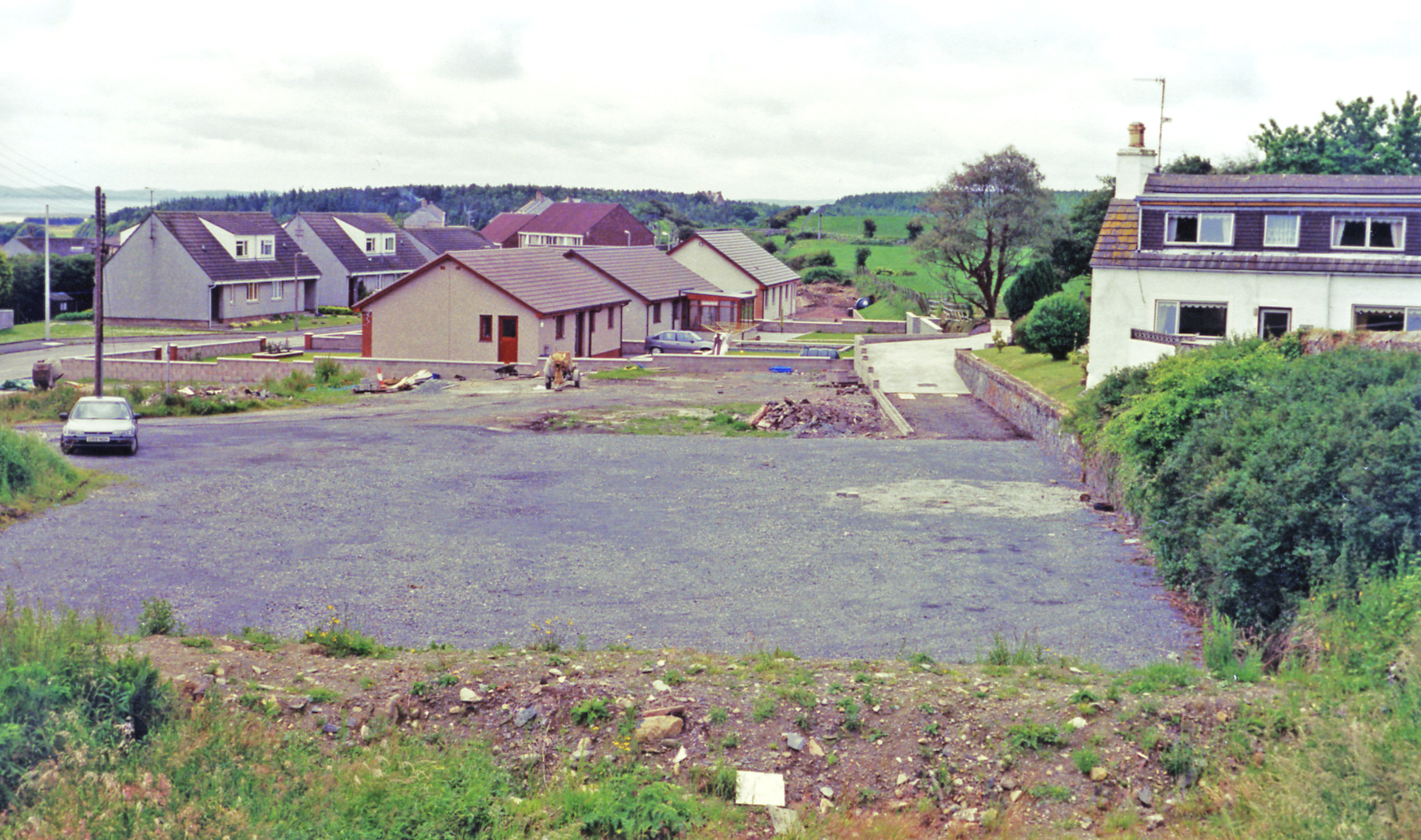
Glenluce station grounds in 1996.

It served the town of Glenluce and provided a strategic link between London Euston and the West Coast Main Line via Carlisle Citadel along the Castle Douglas and Dumfries Railway followed the Portpatrick and Wigtownshire Railway to the port at Stranraer for the ferries to Larne Harbour.

It was closed under the Beeching Axe in 1965.
