= Dercongal Abbey =

Abbey in Dumfries and Galloway, Scotland

Coordinates: 55.102°N 3.639°W

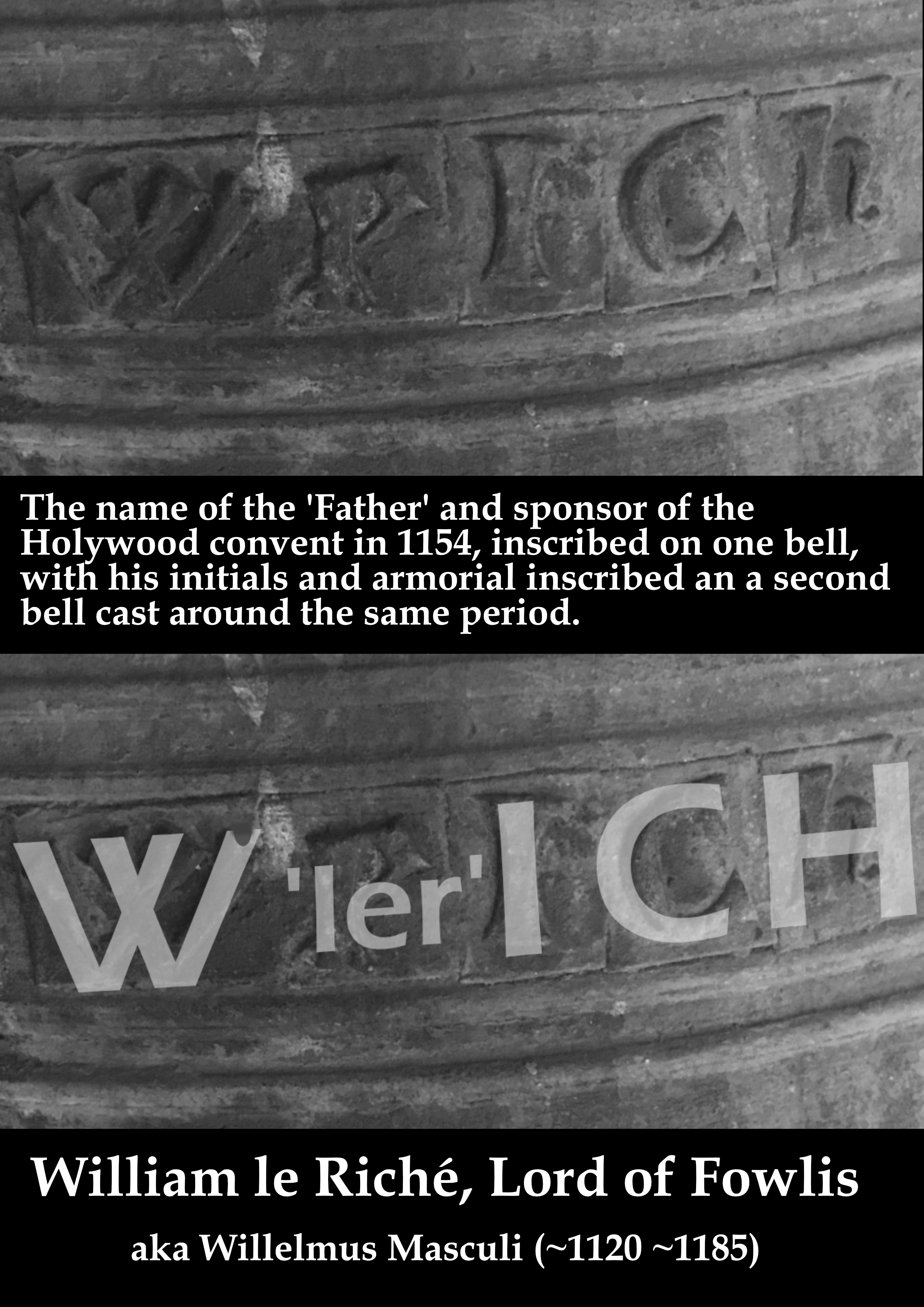
Inscription of the Father and founder of Holywood 'Abbey' in around 1150, Lord William le Riche

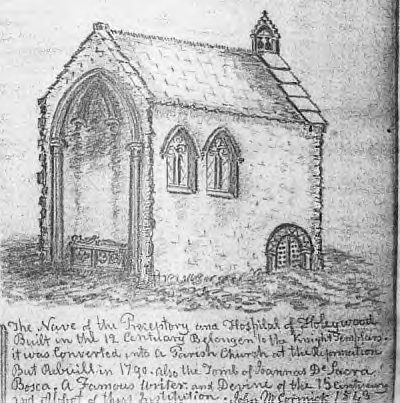
The nave of the hospital and preceptory of the abbey as sketch in 1849, seven decades since the demolition of the abbey ruins.

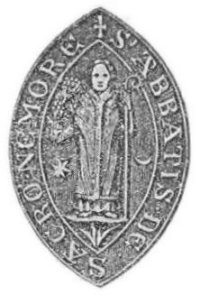
Seal of one of the abbots.

Dercongal Abbey (or Holywood Abbey) was possibly a thirteenth century Premonstratensian monastic community located in Dumfriesshire, Scotland.

== History ==
The date of its original foundation of the monastic house is not known, but it was in existence as a Knights Templar preceptory and infirmary by 1154. The founder being Lord William le Riche of Fowlis, aka Willelmius Masculus, who is cited on two bells taken from the founding of the Templar house, dating from the mid twelfth century.

Dercongal seems to come from Doire Congaill, Congall's oak-copse, Congall (Welsh, Cinvall) being a saint venerated by the natives of the area. For this reason the abbot of Dercongal also became known as the abbot "de Sacro Nemore" (="of the Holy Wood"), becoming "Holywood" in English.

Saint Vimin (died 579) is said to have founded Holywood Abbey. Little of its history is known and few of the abbots of Dercongal names have survived, although a good deal of archaeological remains are extant. The abbey became secularized in the 16th century and in the beginning of the 17th century was turned into a secular lordship. The ruins of the abbey were demolished in the last quarter of the 18th century.

Sir Herbert Maxwell records that Archibald Douglas, 'Archibald the Grim', Earl of Wigtown, built a hospital at the Monastery of Holywood in gratitude for his successes, both personal and political. Archibald had previously endowed the establishment with the lands of Crossmichael and Troqueer in the Stewartry. Maxwell regards the Abbey of Holywood (Abbacia Sancti Nemoris) as being founded by Devorgilla, daughter of Alan, Lord of Galloway and mother of King John Balliol.

Grose records that a fine Gothic arch supported the oak roof and under the floor were a number of sepulchral vaults. Also stated is that the renowned medieval scholar and astronomer Johannes de Sacrobosco was once a monk at the abbey.

The RCAHMS records that in 1362 almshouses for men were set up within the abbey precincts and that in 1609 the temporal Barony of Holywood was established.

== See also ==
- Abbot of Dercongal

== Bibliography ==
- Cowan, Ian B. & Easson, David E., Medieval Religious Houses: Scotland With an Appendix on the Houses in the Isle of Man, Second Edition, (London, 1976), p. 102.
- Grose, Francis (1797). The Antiquities of Scotland. High Holborn : Hooper and Wigstead. V. 2., p. 170.
- Hewison, James K. (1912). Cambridge County Geographies Dumfriesshire. Cambridge University Press, p. 106.
- Maxwell, Sir Herbert (1896). A History of Dumfries and Galloway. Edinburgh & London : William Blackwood and Sons, p. 118.
- Royal Commission on the Ancient and Historical Monuments of Scotland. Canmore Website - Holywood Abbey.
- Watson, W.J., The Celtic Place-Names of Scotland, (Edinburgh, 1926) reprinted, with an Introduction, full Watson bibliography and corrigenda by Simon Taylor (Edinburgh, 2004), p. 169
- Watt, D.E.R. & Shead, N.F. (eds.), The Heads of Religious Houses in Scotland from the 12th to the 16th Centuries, The Scottish Records Society, New Series, Volume 24, (Edinburgh, 2001), pp. 97–9
