= Abbot of Dercongal =

The Abbot of Dercongal or Abbot of Holywood (later Commendator of Holywood) was the head of the Premonstratensian monastic community of Dercongal Abbey (or Holywood Abbey as it was later called). The history of the abbots of the house is obscure and very few are known by name. The following is a list of abbots and commendators who are known:

== List of known abbots ==
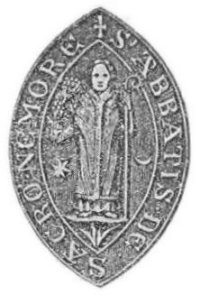
A seal of one of the abbots.

- Odo Ydonc, 1225
- Dungald, 1296
- Walter, 1356–1372
- William Adougan, 1394–1415
- Thomas Adunyl, 1432
- Nicholas Bilsack, 1474–1491
- John Douglas, 1485–1491
- John MacCanish, 1490
- John Welch, 1491-1507 x 1519
- John Maxwell, 1516-1523

== List of known commendators ==
- William Kennedy, 1524-1540
- Thomas Campbell, 1548–1579
- James Johnston of Dunskellie, 1580–1600
- John Johnston of Castlemilk, 1600–1617
- Thomas Forrester, 1617

== Bibliography ==
- Watt, D.E.R. & Shead, N.F. (eds.), The Heads of Religious Houses in Scotland from the 12th to the 16th Centuries, The Scottish Records Society, New Series, Volume 24, (Edinburgh, 2001), pp. 97–9

== See also ==
- Dercongal Abbey
