= Glenluce =

Coordinates: 54.878°N 4.811°W

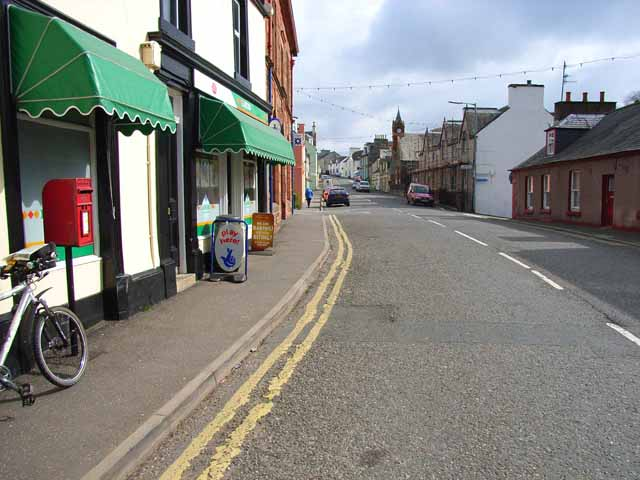
- Glenluce Main Street

- Location within Dumfries and Galloway
- Population: 570 (2020)
- OS grid reference: NX197573
- Civil parish: Old Luce
- Council area: Dumfries and Galloway
- Lieutenancy area: Wigtownshire
- Country: Scotland
- Sovereign state: United Kingdom
- Post town: NEWTON STEWART
- Postcode district: DG8
- Dialling code: 01581
- Police: Scotland
- Fire: Scottish
- Ambulance: Scottish
- UK Parliament: Dumfries and Galloway
- Scottish Parliament: Galloway and West Dumfries

Glenluce (Scottish Gaelic: Clachan Ghlinn Lus) is a small village in the parish of Old Luce in Wigtownshire, Scotland.

It contains a village shop, a caravan park and a town hall, as well as the parish church.

== Location ==
Glenluce on the A75 road between Stranraer (9.5 mi (15 km)) and Newton Stewart (15.5 mi (25 km)). It's 94 mi (151 km) south of Glasgow, 62.6 mi (101 km) west of Dumfries and 138.6 mi (223 km) south west of Edinburgh.

== The Church ==
The Parish Church of Glenluce, with the two chapels, was vested by the king in 1587.

In 1646 the parish of Glenluce was split in two to form Old Luce Parish Church and New Luce Parish Church. However, in 2016 the parishes churches were reunited to form Luce Valley Church, which covers Auchenmalg, Dunragit, Glenluce and New Luce, as well as the surrounding area. They meet at 11am every Sunday in the church in Glenluce and the current minister is Rev Stephen Ogston.

== Castle of Park ==
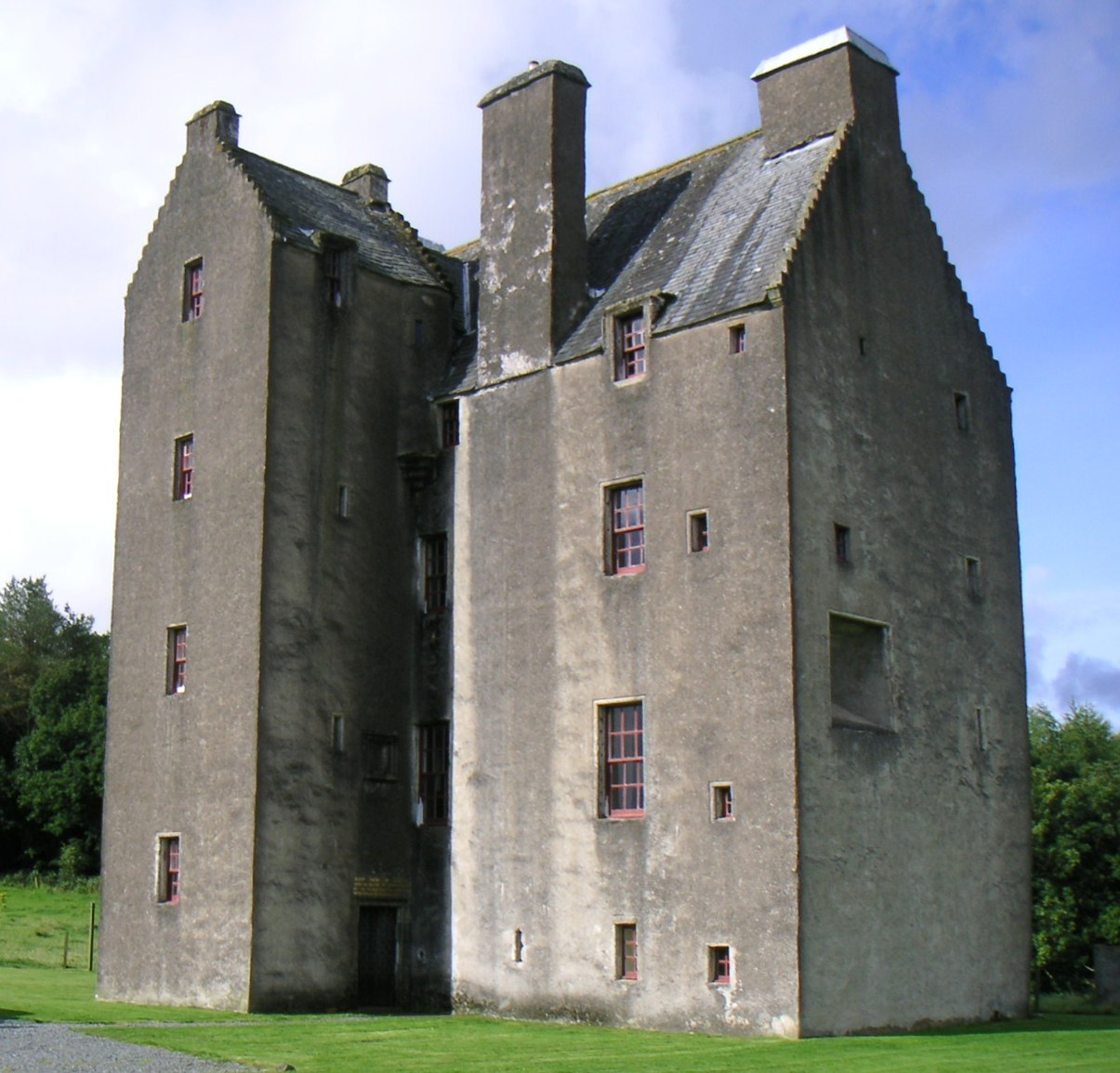
The Castle of Park

The Castle of Park is an L-plan tower house near the village. It was built in 1596 by Thomas Hay, upon the lands given to him by his father, who was the last abbot of Glenluce Abbey. The Hay family continued to live there until 1830, when they abandoned the castle, leaving it to fall into disrepair.

The building remained empty until 1949, when the Ministry of Works came into possession of it. They performed some restoration work on the roof, but stripped out the floors and demolished the wings, which were derelict by this time.

From 1976 to 1978 Historic Scotland undertook a restoration programme, repairing the walls and renewing the floors and windows. They then leased it to the Landmark Trust, who have now opened the castle to the public.

== Administration ==
Glenluce formerly had its own parish; however in 1646 this was split in two, forming the parishes of Old and New Luce.

At a regional level, Glenluce is governed by Dumfries and Galloway Council which covers Galloway (of which Wigtownshire forms the western half) and Dumfriesshire.

Locally it is governed by Old Luce Community Council.

== Glenluce Abbey ==
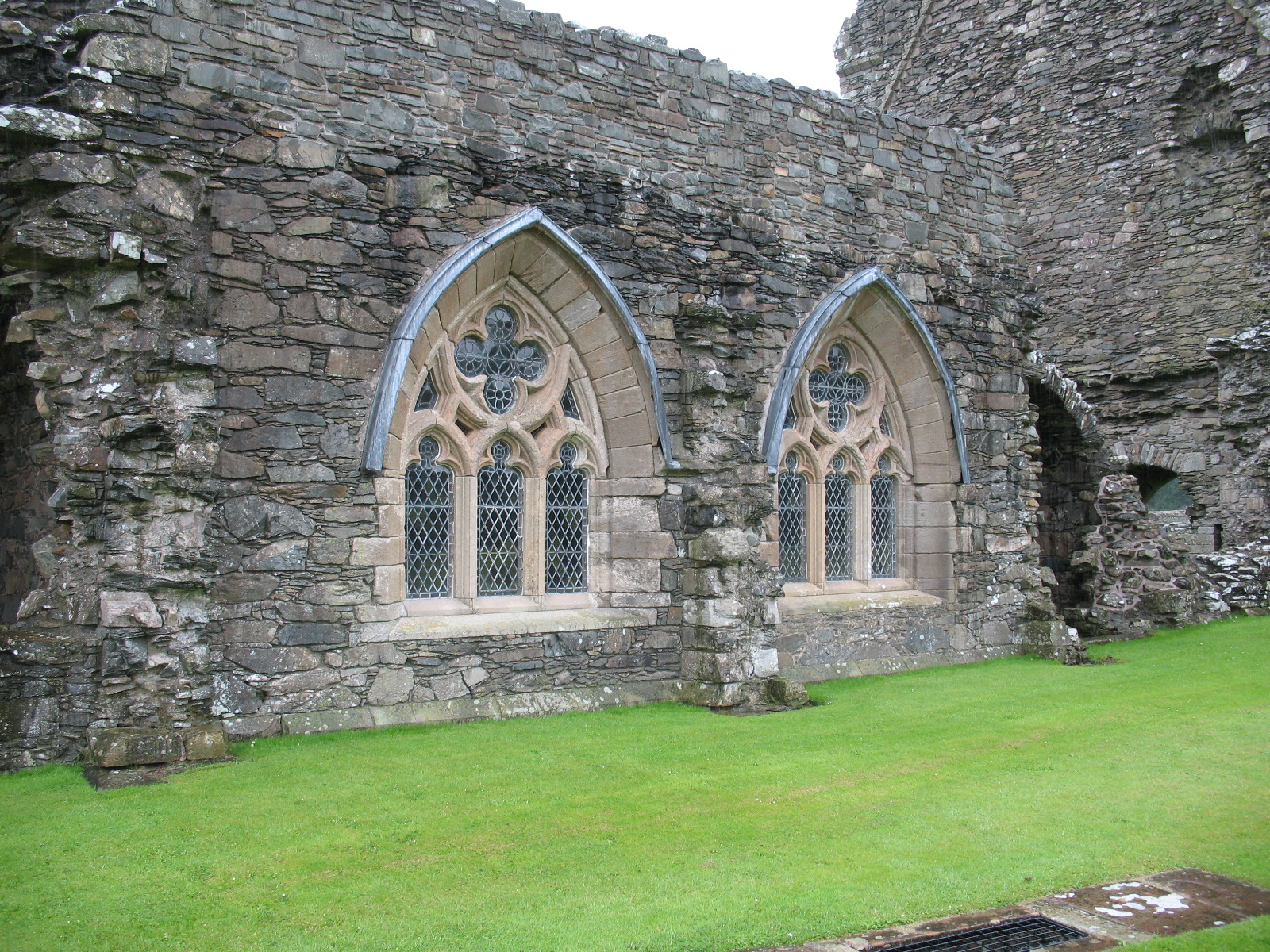
Glenluce Abbey stained glass windows in the Chapter House.

Near to the village is Glenluce Abbey, a ruined Cistercian monastery built in 1192 by Lochlann, Lord of Galloway. Following its dissolution at the Reformation it was abandoned, falling into its current ruinous state.

== Railways ==
The town was served by Glenluce railway station from 1862 by the Portpatrick and Wigtownshire Joint Railway which provided a strategic link to Northern Ireland under British Rail. However, it was cut under the Beeching Axe in 1965.

== See also ==
- New Luce
