= Abbot of Glenluce =

Ancestry history

The Abbot of Glenluce (later, Commendator of Glenluce) was the head of the monastic community of Glenluce Abbey, Galloway. The monastery was founded in 1192 by monks from Dundrennan Abbey with the patronage of Lochlann (Roland), Lord of Galloway. In the 16th century the monastery increasingly came under the control of secular warlords. In 1560 the monastery was occupied by James Gordon of Lochinvar (brother of the recently deceased commendator), and the monks were expelled. However, soon after, Thomas Hay, a follower of the earl of Cassillis (Lochinvar's enemy), was installed in the monastery as commendator and the monks were allowed to return. However, monastic life seems to have disappeared by the end of the century. In 1602 parliament granted the lands of the monastery to Lawrence Gordon as a secular lordship. The abbey was finally given to the bishop of Galloway in 1619. The following is a list of abbots and abbot-commendators:

== List of abbots ==
- William, fl. 1214-1216
- John, fl. 1222
- Gilbert, 1222 x 1233-1233
- Robert, fl. 1236
- Michael I, 1236-1243
- Alan Musarde, fl. 1244
- Godfrey, fl. 1273
- Alexander de Northberwic, fl. 1329
- Bede, fl. 1347
- Adam, fl. 1381
- John White, fl. x 1486
- Andrew Ramsay, fl. 1486
- Michael II, fl. 1493-1499

== List of commendators ==
- Robert Beaton, 1500-1509
- Richard Rinayd, 1507
- Dominic Grimani, 1509-1520
- Quintin MacCalbert, 1509 x 1512
- [Gille?] Cuthbert Baillie, 1512-1513
- Gilbert Strachan, 1512
- Peter de Accoltis, 1513
- David Hamilton, 1513-1519
- Alexander Cunningham, 1513-1518 x 1519
- Walter Malim, 1519-1556
- James Gordon, 1547-1559
- Thomas Hay, 1560-1575
- Gilbert Moncrieff, 1581-1582
- Laurence Gordon, 1582-1602
  - William Gordon, 1582

== Bibliography ==
- Cowan, Ian B. & Easson, David E., Medieval Religious Houses: Scotland With an Appendix on the Houses in the Isle of Man, Second Edition, (London, 1976), p. 75
- Watt, D.E.R. & Shead, N.F. (eds.), The Heads of Religious Houses in Scotland from the 12th to the 16th Centuries, The Scottish Records Society, New Series, Volume 24, (Edinburgh, 2001), pp. 86–90
