= Glenluce Abbey =

Monastery in Dumfries and Galloway, Scotland

Coordinates: 54°53′21″N 4°49′53″W

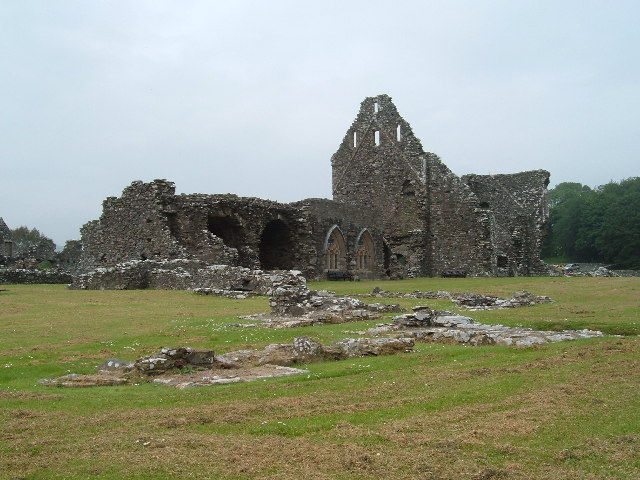
- Abbey in 2005
- Interactive map of Glenluce Abbey

Monastery information
- Full name: Comune Monasterii Beate Maeri de Valle Lucis
- Other name: Abbey of Luce
- Order: Cistercian
- Established: 1192
- Disestablished: 1602
- Mother house: Dundrennan Abbey
- Diocese: Diocese of Galloway
- Controlled churches: Glenluce

People
- Founder: Lochlann, Lord of Galloway

Scheduled monument
- Official name: Glenluce Abbey
- Type: Ecclesiastical: abbey
- Designated: 21 October 1994
- Reference no.: SM90153

Glenluce Abbey, near to Glenluce, Scotland, was a Cistercian monastery called also Abbey of Luce or Vallis Lucis and founded around 1190 by Rolland or Lochlann, Lord of Galloway and Constable of Scotland. Following the Scottish Reformation in 1560, the abbey fell into disuse.

== Ballinclach ==
On 23 January 1497, James IV erected "Ballinclach in Glenluce" into a burgh of barony in favour of the abbey, although there is no record of the burgh operating.

== Glenluce and the Kennedy family ==
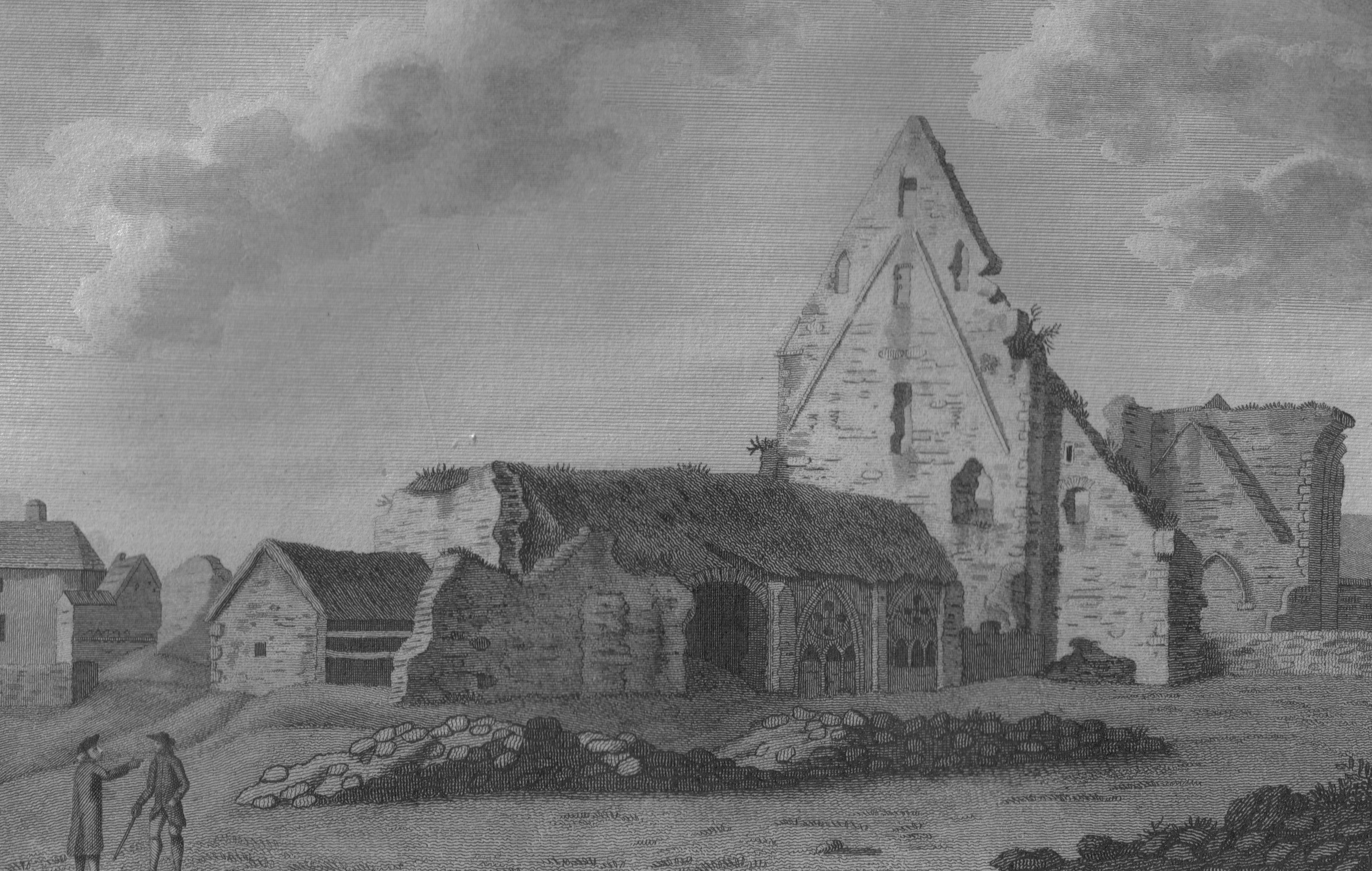
Pl.2. The abbey ruins in 1789

In 1560, after the Scottish Reformation, John Gordon of Lochinvar took possession of Glenluce Abbey. His servant Cuthbert Kirkpatrick refused entry to the abbot, Thomas Hay. Lochinvar removed himself and his servants in November 1561, and gave the key to Gilbert Kennedy, 4th Earl of Cassilis.

Gilbert Kennedy, 4th Earl of Cassilis persuaded one of the monks of the abbey to counterfeit the necessary signatures to a deed conveying the lands of the abbey to him and his heirs. To ensure that the forgery was not discovered he employed a man to murder the monk and then persuaded his uncle, the laird of Bargany, to hang his paid assassin on a trumped up charge of theft. The success of these actions encouraged him to obtain the lands of Crossraguel Abbey through the torturing of Allan Stewart, the commendator at his castle of Dunure.

Mary, Queen of Scots stayed at Glenluce on 9 August 1563.

In March 1587 the king's tutor Peter Young tried to find manuscripts of Caesar's Commentary and a Greek "Hegisippus" that the last Abbot of Glenluce had promised to him.

The ruins were consolidated and partly restored in 1898 by the Glasgow architect, Peter MacGregor Chalmers. They are a scheduled monument.

== See also ==
- Abbot of Glenluce, for a list of abbots and commendators
- Scheduled monuments in Dumfries and Galloway
