= John de Crannach =

Scottish scholar, diplomat and prelate

- Bishop of Brechin
- See: Brechin
- In office: 1426–1453 or 1454 (his death)
- Predecessor: Walter Forrester
- Successor: George Shoreswood
- Previous post(s): Bishop of Caithness; Rector of Chantenay

Orders
- Consecration: between 6 October 1426 and 5 October 1427

Personal details
- Born: c. 1386; Banffshire
- Died: sometime between 17 November 1453 and 8 March 1454 unknown

John de Crannach (c. 1386 – 1453/54) was a 15th-century Scottish scholar, diplomat and prelate. Originating in the north-east of Lowland Scotland, he probably came from a family associated with the burgh of Aberdeen. Like many of his relatives, he flourished in the 15th-century Scottish church. After just over a decade at the University of Paris, Crannach became a servant of the then Dauphin (later king) Charles (VII).

During his period in France he received provision as bishop of Caithness, but within four years was translated and consecrated bishop of Brechin. He was a prominent ambassador of James I and travelled abroad frequently during the 1430s and early 1440s. In the diocese of Brechin Crannach was usually absent until 1445, but was embroiled in a dispute with the archdeacon of Brechin Gilbert Forrester.

== Early years ==
He was born around 1386 (or soon before), which is known because he was a Master of Arts in 1406, a requirement of which was being at least 20 years old. The name "de Crannach" comes from the former sheriffdom of Banff, either Crannach in Grange parish or Cranna in Marnoch parish. John's father was probably Laurence de Crannach (fl. 1398), burgess of Aberdeen, whose wife was named Christiana.

Three of his brothers are known; one, William, was a prominent Augustinian canon who became abbot of Inchaffray (1430–1433 or 1435), while another, David de Crannach, was sub-dean of Dunkeld and dean of Brechin. His third brother, Robert de Crannach, was precentor of Brechin from 1440 to sometime between 1453 and 1457, as well as dean of Dunblane (1430–1439 or 1440). His uncle, Adam de Crannach (also "de Aberdeen"), was also a prominent Augustistian, serving as abbot of Scone between 1418 and 1432.

A student of the University of Paris in the early 15th century, he was Bachelor of Arts in February 1405, and a Licentiate and Master of Arts in May 1406. He was regent of the Arts between 1406 and his departure from the university in 1417. The famous archdeacon of Aberdeen and poet, John Barbour, stood surety for him in 1406 and 1407. For some time, John was a student of theology, having become a Bachelor of Theology by autumn of 1416.

He was also a participant in student and school affairs, being variously a key holder of the University of Paris' "English nation" (the nation at the university for all non-Romance speakers) and head of the Scottish province therein. He served as representative of the university at a Paris ecclesiastical council, 30 November 1413, which debated and denounced the arguments of theologian Jean Petit. During the same period, Crannach was a popular teacher of Scottish and other students at the university, but did not return there after January 1418 when he left for the papal court at Constance.

== Diplomat and churchman ==
Paris in the following years was subject to occupation and incursions from both Burgundians and English, both enemies of the Franco-Scottish alliance. In this era Crannach served the Dauphin Charles as a diplomat, counsellor and "household master of requests" [Watt]. He headed an embassy to Scotland in 1419 that resulted in a Scottish army being brought to France. He was still in the service of Charles, now king, when Pope Martin V provided Crannach bishop of Caithness on 4 December 1422. He travelled to Scotland again soon after this provision, along with John Stewart, Earl of Buchan, and is recorded at Edinburgh in November 1423.

Crannach was in Rome in 1424, probably in relation to his bishopric, provision to which was renewed in Crannach's presence on 11 December 1424. Although his kinsmen and other agents were drawing revenue from the see by May 1425, he remained unconsecrated and probably had yet to visit the diocese even in June 1426.

Historian and bishop John Dowden believed that he had held the position of Dean of Fortrose Cathedral, but the John in question was not Crannach but John Innes, future bishop of Moray. By 1424 at the latest Crannach was a priest and rector of Chantenay (in Sarthe department) in the diocese of Le Mans, a canonry gained either through the university of through service to the Dauphin.

It was on 7 June 1426 that Crannach was translated from Caithness to the apparently more appealing see of Brechin, vacant by the death of Walter Forrester. Crannach was consecrated at some point between October 1426 and October 1427. He was in Rome in 1426 as part of an embassy sent by the king of the Scots, James I, who wished, among other things, to secure the appointment of John Cameron as bishop of Glasgow.

== Bishop of Brechin ==
Crannach's activities immediately following his translation to Brechin are not clear, but he did not appear again in Scotland until May 1429. In December that year he departed to the papal court via Bruges on a mission to reverse a papal citation of Bishop Cameron, and while at the papal court in 1430 he and Cameron's other proctor, Thomas de Merton, were excommunicated due to Cameron's failure to pay the money due for confirmation of the bishopric; the excommunication was lifted in 1432.

His chief role in the 1430s appears to be that of a royal ambassador and papal petitioner. He was appointed as a representative of King James to the Council of Basel in 1433, but this seems to have been done by his brother Robert de Crannach. He helped negotiate the royal marriage between Scotland and France, and conducted James' daughter Margaret to La Rochelle in 1436 before arranging the final details of the marriage. He was present at the wedding at Tours on 13 June 1436. He was at Bruges in July 1436, and at Rome between February and July 1437, again in 1440, and yet again from September to November 1442.

As a diocesan, Crannach was much absent, taking up residence in his diocese in three periods: 1429, 1433–1436, and from 1445 onwards. In 1429, he witnessed the foundation of a college of priests at Brechin by Walter Stewart, Earl of Atholl and Lord of Brechin. In June 1430 Crannach obtained a license to visit his diocese by proxy, and only in March 1433 is he found once again in his diocese. From 1433 to 1436 there is an intense period of activity by the bishop, the extant records emphasizing the bishop's attempts to secure his revenues and property. There was a dispute with Gilbert Forrester, the archdeacon of Brechin and nephew of the previous bishop. Forrester, who perhaps thought himself entitled to the episcopal office, is said to have assaulted the bishop in church, and was subsequently excommunicated by the cathedral chapter on 27 February 1435.

Although largely absent from his diocese between 1436 and 1445, his presence is on record for January 1439, February 1441, and February 1445. From 1445 onwards he appears settled in his diocese, and the evidence once again indicates Crannach's concern with securing the rights and privileges of his office and see. One of his earliest acts in this period was the purchase of land at Keithock (Angus). He endowed a chaplaincy on 11 June 1451 for the benefit of his own soul, and for the soul of his former lord Walter Stewart, despite the damnatio memoriae of the latter for regicide. The dispute with the archdeacon Gilbert Forrester continued, Forrester's excommunication being renewed on 30 July 1448. Forrester tried to secure exemption from episcopal authority at the Roman court. Although Crannach resisted Forrester, the bishop-archdeacon dispute was to continue after Crannach's death. Crannach also attacked his dean, John de Lichton (Leighton) for inefficiency and immorality.

The Auchinleck Chronicle placed Crannach's death in 1456, but this is incorrect. Crannach's last appearance in surviving contemporary sources is 17 November 1453. He was dead by 8 March 1454, when his successor George Shoreswood received notice of his provision to the vacant see.

Catholic Church titles
Preceded by Alexander Vaus	Bishop of Caithness unconsecrated 1422–1426	Succeeded by Robert of Strathbrock
Preceded by Walter Forrester	Bishop of Brechin; 1426–1453 x 1454	Succeeded by George Shoreswood

== Sources ==
- Dowden, John (1912), Thomson, John Maitland (ed.), The Bishops of Scotland: Being Notes on the Lives of All the Bishops, under Each of the Sees, Prior to the Reformation, Glasgow: James Maclehose and Sons
- Watt, D.E.R. (1977), A Biographical Dictionary of Scottish Graduates to A.D. 1410, Oxford: Clarendon Press, ISBN 0-19-822447-8
- Watt, D.E.R.; Murray, A. L., eds. (2003), Fasti Ecclesiae Scotinanae Medii Aevi ad annum 1638, The Scottish Record Society, New Series, Volume 25 (Revised ed.), Edinburgh: The Scottish Record Society, ISBN 0-902054-19-8, ISSN 0143-9448
