= Ingram de Ketenis =

Scottish cleric (died 1407 or 1408)

- Born: before 1321 probably Kettins, Angus, Scotland
- Died: 1407 or 1408
- Occupation: cleric
- Title: Archdeacon of Dunkeld; Rector of Tealing; Bishop of Galloway (unaccepted papal provision)

Ingram de Ketenis (alternatively spelled de Kethenys; died 1407 or 1408) was a medieval cleric from Angus in Scotland.

A graduate of the University of Paris, he was Archdeacon of Dunkeld for over half a century. During his time, he received papal provision to be Bishop of Galloway, but refused to accept the position.

== Early life and career ==
Born before 1321, Ingram was the son of John de Ketenis, owner of the land of Kettins in Angus; he had two known brothers, John de Ketenis and Robert de Ketenis, and was the nephew of John de Pilmuir, Bishop of Moray and thus also Richard de Pilmuir, Bishop of Dunkeld.

In the 1340s, Ingram studied at the University of Paris under Scottish-born teacher, Walter de Wardlaw, becoming a Licentiate in the Arts in May 1347, despite not completing a B.A. In his time as a student, he and his two brothers pledged surety to the English Nation of the University of Paris for the expenses of fellow Scot John de Rossy, a pledge that cost them 50 shillings each because in the event Thomas failed to pay. In 1347, he briefly went back to his native Scotland, but returned to Paris in May 1349 to obtain an M. A.

He was at the papal court in Avignon in 1344/5 with his uncle Richard de Pilmuir, attempting to gain favours. He received provision to the church of "Blair", that is, Blairgowrie, on 25 January 1345, with Pope Clement VI commanding the Abbot of Coupar Angus, the Abbot of Scone and the Prior of St Andrews to put him in possession, although it is not clear that he managed to possess full control of this church until 1349 or later. He received a canonry in the diocese of Aberdeen on 18 May 1347, and in the diocese of Moray on 10 May 1349, neither of which he seems to have taken up permanently. He had been at Avignon again in 1349, regarding the Moray canonry, either before or after going to Paris, when he presented petitions for his brother John and his cousin Thomas de Pilmuir. He was recorded at Avignon again in 1350, when he is described as the secretary of Queen Joan; there he was provided to a canonry in the diocese of Glasgow, though once more it is unclear if this provision ever actualised.

== Archdeacon of Dunkeld ==
At some point between 1352 and 1359 he became Archdeacon of Dunkeld, a position which had become vacant because of the death of the previous archdeacon, Adam Pullur. The latter's death occurred before 13 July 1352 when there is a record that one John de Ethie (Athy) was provided to the archdeaconry; the latter provision was unsuccessful, and Ingram is the next known archdeacon. On his funeral monument the inscription says that Ingram was 31 (in "his xxxii yhere") when he obtained the Dunkeld archdeaconry, so he probably obtained at least a claim to the position in 1351 or 1352. He had demitted his right to the church of Blairgowrie by 12 February 1357, and was certainly fully in possession of the archdeaconry by 13 August 1359, when he witnessed a charter (as Archdeacon of Dunkeld) of his uncle John de Pilmuir, Bishop of Moray. The archdeaconry came with the dependent parish church of Tealing in Angus.

His next appearance occurs as a sub-collector of papal taxes to William de Greenlaw, Archdeacon of St Andrews and Dean of Glasgow Cathedral, in 1361. On 17 April 1371, he is a papal mandatory tasked to adjudicate a dispute between a knight and Paisley Abbey. Sometime between 15 July 1378 and 26 February 1379, Ingram was provided as Bishop of Galloway by Avignon-based Antipope Clement VII in opposition to the Urbanist candidate Oswald (see Western Schism). This was done because of the influence of Ingram's old university master, Walter de Wardlaw, now Bishop of Glasgow. Ingram however does not appear to have wanted the bishopric, and found objections to his own provision. As Clement wrote to Thomas de Rossy, the man who did become the Clementine bishop, he had "provided Ingeram, archdeacon of Dunkeld, but he refused to accept his provision".

Although Walter Trail had been provided to succeed Ingram as archdeacon in expectation of Ingram becoming Bishop of Galloway, Ingram's refusal of this bishopric meant that he retained the archdeaconal possession. He made a grant from the lands of Kettin, which he had inherited from his father, to the Dundee chaplaincy of St Thomas the Martyr (i.e. Thomas Becket) on 13 February 1392. Ingram held the position of Archdeacon of Dunkeld until at least 1398, and perhaps as late as 1407. Sometime between those two dates he witnessed (as Archdeacon of Dunkeld) a charter of David Lindsay, Earl of Crawford. At some point after this charter, he exchanged the archdeaconry with Richard de Cornell for the church of Kilmory on the island of Arran in the diocese of the Isles, presumably as D. E. R. Watt commented "just a formal move to give Cornell a title to [the] Dunk[eld] arch[deaconry]".

== Death and memorial ==
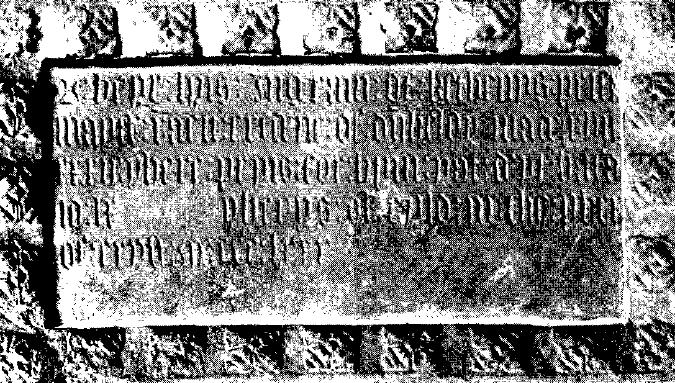
19th century sketch of Ingram's inscribed funeral monument.

One of the most notable facts about Ingram is his planned funeral monument. In the 1380s a memorial stone and a partially incomplete inscription were prepared for him at the church of Tealing; this monument has survived, and lay in a recess in the north wall of the modern (early 19th century) church, having been moved from the earlier church one mile away. The stone reads:

heyr lyis Ingram of kethenys prist maystir in arit ersdene of dunkeldyn made in his xxxii yhere prayis for hym yat deyit hafand lx ... [sic] ... yherys of eld in the yher of cryst M: ccc: lxxx ... [sic] ...
Here lies Ingram of Kethenys, Priest, Master in Arts, Archdeacon of Dunkeldyn, made in his thirty-second year. Pray for him that died, having [reached] sixty [blank] years of age, in the year of Christ 1380.

The blanks after his age and the date indicate that he expected death soon (within ten years) in 1380, but in the event, Ingram lived into the second half of the first decade of the 15th century. Ingram was still alive on 6 April 1407, but was dead by July 1408, when a papal document confirms his recent death and the resulting vacancy in the church of Tealing. The inscription is probably the earliest, or earliest known inscription, written in Scotland north of the River Forth in the English language.

== Notes ==
Religious titles
Preceded by John de Ethie	Archdeacon of Dunkeld; 1351 × 1359-1398 × 1407	Succeeded by Richard de Cornell
Preceded by Adam de Lanark	Bishop of Galloway declined papal provision 1378 × 1379	Succeeded by Thomas de Rossy
