= Robert Wishart =

Bishop of Glasgow from 1273 to 1316

- Bishop of Glasgow
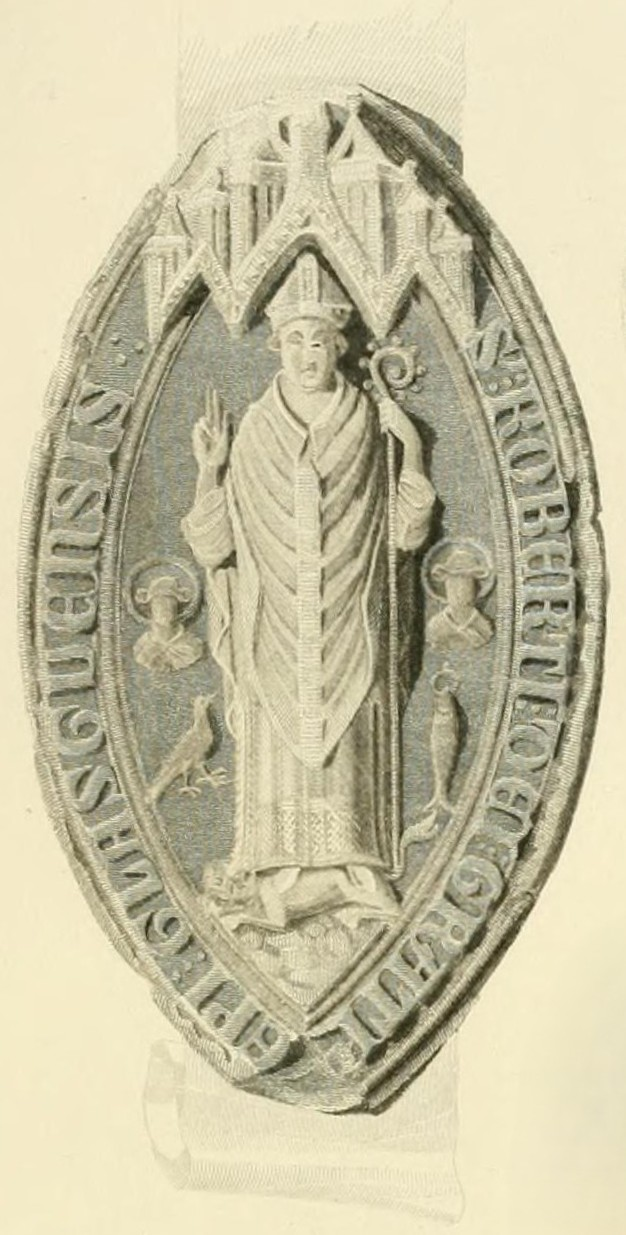
- Robert Wishart seal
- Church: Roman Catholic Church
- See: Diocese of Glasgow
- In office: 1271–1316
- Predecessor: William Wishart
- Successor: Stephen de Dunnideer
- Previous posts: Archdeacon of St Andrews and Archdeacon of Lothian

Orders
- Consecration: 29 January 1273, at Aberdeen

Personal details
- Born: unknown unknown
- Died: Probably 26 November 1316

Robert Wishart was Bishop of Glasgow during the Wars of Scottish Independence and a leading supporter of Sir William Wallace and King Robert Bruce. For Wishart and many of his fellow churchmen, the freedom of Scotland and the freedom of the Scottish church were one and the same thing. His support for the national cause was to be of crucial importance at some critical times.

== Bishop and guardian ==
Robert Wishart belongs to the Wisharts, or Wisehearts, of Pittarrow, a family of Norman-French origin. He was either the cousin or nephew of William Wishart, Bishop of St. Andrews, a former Chancellor of Scotland. Wishart's first recorded office in the church was as archdeacon of St. Andrews. He was appointed Bishop of Glasgow in 1273. As well as a churchman he became a prominent political figure during the reign of Alexander III. After the death of Alexander in 1286 Wishart was one of a panel of six Guardians, appointed to take charge of national affairs for the infant Margaret, Maid of Norway. Although he and his fellow guardians signed the Treaty of Birgham, which envisaged the future marriage of Margaret to Prince Edward, the eldest son of Edward I, King of England, their agreement was subject to the caveat that the treaty would do nothing to threaten the integrity of the Kingdom of Scotland.

The early death of the maid in 1290 left no generally recognised heir to the throne of Scotland. With the country threatening to descend into a dynastic war between the supporters of Robert Bruce, 5th Lord of Annandale, the grandfather of the future king, and John Balliol, Wishart was closely involved in all of the diplomatic negotiations with King Edward, invited to adjudicate between the rival claimants. When Edward insisted that he be recognised as Lord Paramount of Scotland prior to giving a decision in the matter, Wishart pointed out that "the kingdom of Scotland is not held in tribute or homage to anyone save God alone". Edward simply sidestepped these objections; and with no means of settling the question by any internal process, he was duly accepted as overlord by guardians and claimants alike.

In the great feudal court held at Berwick-upon-Tweed, Bruce and Balliol were allowed to appoint forty auditors each, with Wishart taking his place in the Bruce camp. He remained consistent in his support even when some of his fellow auditors voted for John Balliol, having the superior claim in feudal law. Even so, as a prominent churchman, he remained at the forefront of public affairs during the reign of King John and was one of those who ratified the Scoto-Norman alliance – subsequently to be known as the Auld Alliance – in February 1296. After Edward's conquest of Scotland, he along with the other chief men of the realm swore fealty to the English king.

== Independence and the Church ==
Almost from the outset, and in spite of his forced oath to Edward, Wishart was involved in the struggle against the English occupation of Scotland. He along with William Lamberton, the Bishop of St. Andrews, and David de Moravia, Bishop of Moray, formed an important clerical foundation for the struggles of William Wallace and Robert Bruce. They were patriots but in two distinct senses of that term. The Scottish church had long guarded its own independent traditions within the universal church, resisting all attempts to subordinate it to the archdiocese of York, and insisting that no intermediary come between it and Rome. All attempts at dilution were resisted, causing Pope Nicholas IV to censure the clergy in 1289 for objecting to the promotion of foreigners to ecclesiastical office in Scotland. Now Edward's conquest brought with it the prospect once again of submission to York or Canterbury and the appointment of English clergy to vacant Scottish benefices. The hostile Lanercost Chronicle says of Wishart and those like him:

In like manner, as we know, that it is truly written, that evil priests are the cause of the people's ruin, so the ruin of the realm of Scotland had its source within the bosom of her church, ... for with one consent both those who discharged the office of prelate and those who were preachers, corrupted the ears and minds of the nobles, and commons, by advice and exhortation, both publicly and secretly, stirring them to enmity against the king and nation ... declaring falsely that it was more justifiable to attack them than the Saracen.

== Wishart's Rising ==
In 1297, even before William Wallace made his appearance, Wishart was among the early leaders of the rising against the English occupation. According to the Lanercost Chronicle it was he, along with James Stewart, the High Steward of Scotland, who prodded Wallace into action. Wishart's first rising came to a premature end in July 1297 when he surrendered to the English at Irvine, but the ball was rolling and would not stop.

The rebel bishop was imprisoned for a time, swore his fealty to Edward anew, only to renounce it as soon as he was released. In May 1301 Edward himself wrote to Pope Boniface VIII in an obvious mood of frustration, requesting Wishart's removal from the see of Glasgow. Boniface would not consent to this, but he wrote to Wishart demanding that he desist in his opposition to Edward, and denouncing him as "the prime mover and instigator of all the tumult and dissension which has risen between his dearest son in Christ, Edward, King of England, and the Scots". In the surrender of the patriotic party in February 1304 Wishart was initially condemned to banishment from Scotland for two or three years "on account of the great evils he has caused".

== The Bishop and the Bruce ==
Wishart's tomb in the crypt of Glasgow Cathedral

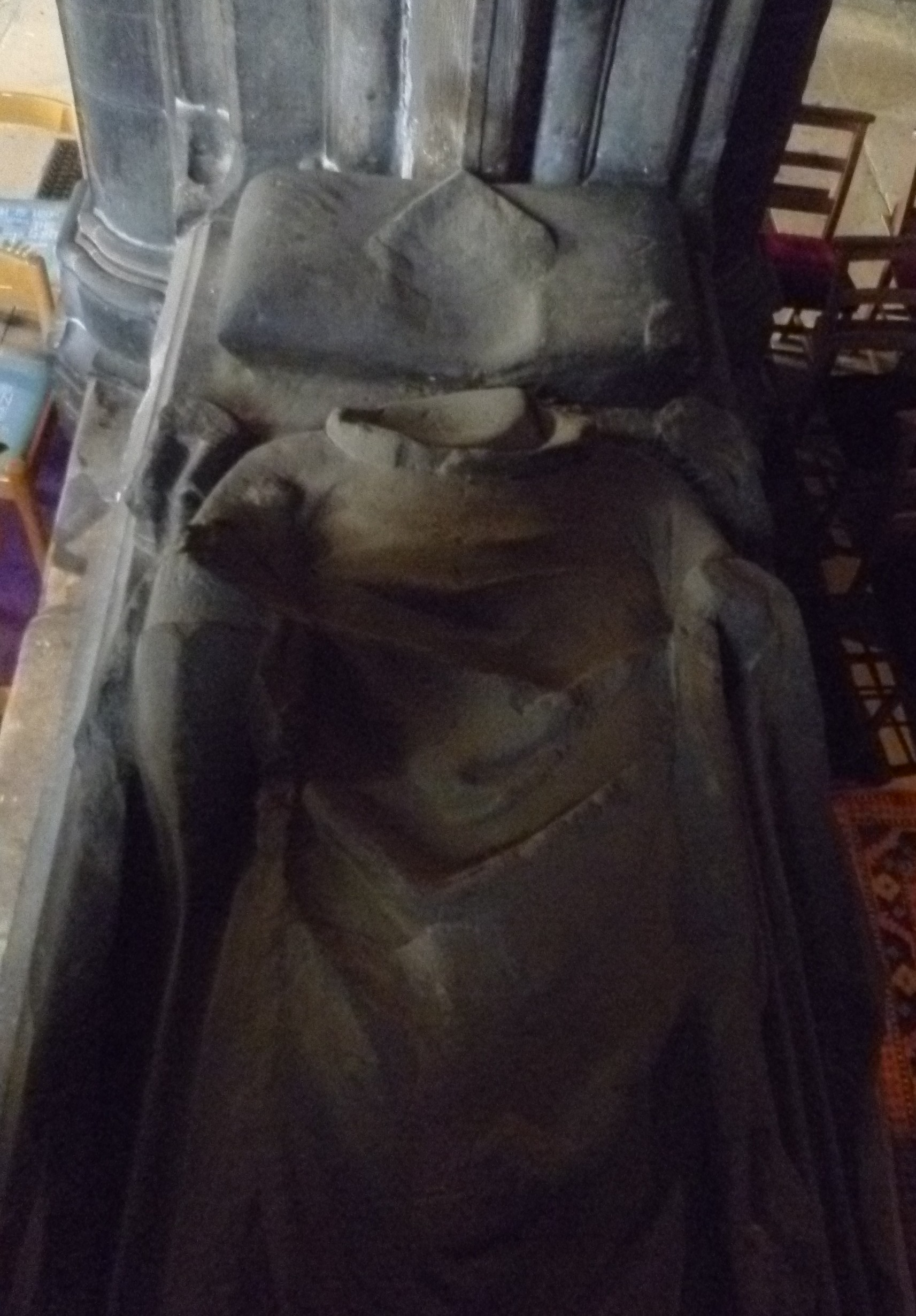
Wishart's defaced effigy

On 10 February 1306 Robert Bruce and a small party of supporters killed John Comyn, a leading rival, in the chapel of the Greyfriars, Dumfries. It was an act of political rebellion: perhaps even more serious, it was an act of supreme sacrilege. He now faced the future as an outlaw and an excommunicate, an enemy of the state and the church. It was to be many years before the Pope was prepared to forgive him, but the support of Wishart and the other Scottish bishops was of inestimable importance at this moment of crisis.

Bruce went to Glasgow where he met Wishart, in whose diocese the murder had been committed. Rather than excommunicating the earl Wishart immediately gave him absolution and urged his flock to rise in his support. He then accompanied Bruce to Scone, the site of all Scottish coronations. They there met his brother bishops of St Andrews and Moray, as well as other prominent churchmen, in what gives the appearance of a well-arranged plan. Less than seven weeks after the killing in Dumfries, along with a number of prominent lay figures they all witnessed the coronation of King Robert I on 25 March. The country was immediately put on a war footing, with Wishart himself, despite his advancing years, being in the forefront of the preparations. The timber the English had given him to repair the bell tower of Glasgow Cathedral was used for making siege engines, and he took personal charge of the assault on Cupar Castle in Fife, "like a man of war", as the enemy later complained.

All these hopes and efforts were soon frustrated by the advance of an English army under Aymer de Valence in the summer of 1306: Bruce was defeated at the Battle of Methven, soon to be forced into hiding, and Wishart was captured at Cupar. He was taken south in chains, and incarcerated in an English dungeon, saved only from execution by his clerical orders. Edward was delighted with the capture of this "traitor and rebel", and wrote to the Pope in September telling him that Wishart, along with William de Lamberton, was being held in close confinement, and that custody of the see of Glasgow had been entrusted to Geoffery de Mowbray.

Wishart was to remain in prison for the next eight years, going blind in the course of his captivity. He may have been held for some of the time in Wisbech Castle in the Isle of Ely.

It was not until after King Robert's triumph at the Battle of Bannockburn that he was released as part of a prisoner exchange. He returned to Scotland to live out his life in relative peace, finally dying in Glasgow in November 1316, "indisputedly one of the great figures in the struggle for Scottish independence ... the patron and friend of Wallace and Bruce, the persistent opponent of Plantagenet pretensions, an unheroic hero of the long war".

== Final resting place ==
After his death in 1316, his body was entombed at the back of the crypt in Glasgow Cathedral where he was Bishop for much of his life. The tomb is uninscribed and the head of the effigy has been defaced at some point, probably during the Reformation.

Religious titles
Preceded by William Wishart (unconsecrated); Nicholas de Moffat (unconsecrated); John de Cheam	Bishop of Glasgow; 1271–1316	Succeeded by Stephen de Dunnideer (unconsecrated); John de Egglescliffe (never took possession); John de Lindesay
