= Walter Forrester =

Bishop of Brechin

- Bishop of Brechin
- Church: Roman Catholic Church
- See: Diocese of Brechin
- In office: 1407 – 1425 or 1426
- Predecessor: Stephen de Cellario
- Successor: John de Crannach
- Previous posts: Subdean of Brechin (occurred 1400–1407); Archdeacon of Lothian (occurred 1386) + other benefices (see text)

Orders
- Consecration: 11 May 1410 – 10 May 1411

Personal details
- Born: c. 1355 Angus
- Died: 1425 or 1426 uncertain

Walter Forrester (died 1425 or 1426), bishop of Brechin, was an administrator and prelate in later medieval Scotland. Originating in Angus, he came from a family of English origin who by the end of the 14th century had become well established in Scottish society. A student of the University of Paris and University of Orleans, he began his career at home by the later 1370s.

He became a royal clerk, and appears to have held the position of archdeacon of Lothian c. 1386. After extending his education at Paris in the 1390s, he returned to Scotland to continue clerical and ambassadorial duties for the monarch, and was awarded with the bishopric of Brechin in 1407. He held this post, along with that of Clerk of the Register, until his death in either 1425 or 1426.

== Origins and early education ==
It is known from later documents that Walter Forrester was from the diocese of Brechin, born sometime in or before 1355. The Forresters were a middle-ranking family of English origin who rose to greater prominence during Walter's lifetime. The name of his father is unrecorded, but his mother's name was Mariota or Marion. He had a brother named Patrick Forrester, a burgess of Dundee, and a half-brother named Patrick de Dalgarnock. John Forrester, variously Archdeacon of Teviotdale, Official of Aberdeen and Official of Glasgow, and Adam Forrester, burgess of Edinburgh, laird of Corstorphine and one of the wealthiest merchants in contemporary Scotland, were his kinsmen, though the detail of this kinship is not recorded.

Forrester attended the University of Paris, graduating Bachelor of Arts under fellow-Scot William de Trebrun in March 1375, and becoming Licentiate in Arts the following May. He was a student of canon law at the University of Orleans c. 1375–79. He returned to Scotland by April 1379. By 12 April 1384 he was holding a canonry attached to Aberdeen Cathedral. It is likely that the prebend was the church of Mortlach, as he can be confirmed holding this church in a document datable to 22 April 1392.

== Clerical service and later education ==
Forrester began a career in the service of the Scottish monarchy, becoming Deputy Clerk of the Wardrobe in the late 1370s and Clerk of the Wardrobe by March 1381. He was Keeper of the Privy Seal for a short period in 1386 (filling in for Duncan Petit), and served an auditor of the exchequer from March 1386. He is found as the officiating clerk in a treaty between Scotland and France sealed at Edinburgh on 1 December 1390. On or before 11 March 1391, he resigned to other members of his family his own land at Inverdovat in Forgan parish, Fife, reserving for himself a life-interest; this perhaps indicates that he had set himself on an ecclesiastical career.

He appears as Archdeacon of Lothian in documents from 1386, an extremely prestigious position (or claim at least) he appears to have lost by 1390, when the position is securely held by another. Other honours held before the episcopate, excluding Mortlach, include the church of Liston (by November 1391), previously held by Gilbert de Greenlaw, and the office of sub-dean of Brechin.

From early 1393 until early 1399, he appears to have resumed his studies on the continent, financed perhaps by the Scottish king. By February 1394 he had an M.A. from Paris, and served as regent in the Arts for several years while once again studying canon law. He was a Bachelor of Decrees by July 1398. He was three times serving proctor of the English nation at Paris, March and April 1395, winter 1396/7, and Summer 1398. He was university rector between October and December 1395. Along with two Germans and one John de Edinburgh, he represented the "English nation" at the Second Council of Paris (August and September 1396), and was the nation's proctor at the Third Council (May to July 1398), meetings aimed at ending the Schism. This Council withdrew support from Pope Benedict XIII ("Antipope"), and there is much evidence that Forrester was an enthusiastic proponent of this position, though he later was to serve as a bishop in obedience to this pope.

Returning to Scotland in 1398, he regained his position as Clerk of the Wardrobe. At a royal council in Perth in January 1398, he was named as one of 20 assistants of the Duke of Rothesay as lieutenant of the realm. He was exchequer auditor every year between 1399 and 1404, and was secretary of the king from either the second half of 1401 or first half of 1402, and held this position until Robert III's death in 1406. By June 1403 he was Clerk of the Rolls, a position he would hold until his death. In the first five years of the 1400s (decade), he frequently served as an ambassador to the English, and went to France in 1406, appearing at Paris in April on a committee of the English nation, a trip perhaps connected with his candidacy for the bishopric of Brechin.

== Episcopate ==
Walter was elected bishop of Brechin at some point between 1405 and April 1407. On 11 April 1407 Benedict XIII instructed Henry de Wardlaw, bishop of St Andrews, and Fionnlagh MacCailein, bishop of Dunblane, to investigate any objections to Walter's election, perhaps on account of former hostility to Benedict's cause. He does not appear to have received consecration until some point between 11 May 1410 and 10 May 1411.

After becoming bishop, Walter remained a prominent royal servant, continuing his duties as Clerk of the Rolls and Clerk of the Register, and enjoyed a strong relationship with the ruler of Scotland, now Robert Stewart, Duke of Albany. He officiated at every exchequer audit between May 1409 and July 1422. He also continued his ambassadorial role, serving as leader of a mission to England in 1408 to negotiate the release of James I, the nominal king. He appears to have gone on further missions in May 1412, April 1413 and September 1413, though the evidence we have is for the grants of safe-conduct rather than the expeditions themselves. He was in Rome 1423–1424, and made a separate trip to Flanders later in 1424. After James I's return in 1424, he served once more as exchequer auditor, 7 May 1425.

Like other bishops of Brechin, Forrester does not seem to have been very active in his diocese, on several occasions obtaining papal indults legitimizing procurations without visitation. He is recorded presiding over statutes issued by his cathedral chapter in 1410, and later in the year pursued land claims successfully with the support of Governor Albany and his sheriff in Angus. Albany granted him the second tenth of crown revenues from the sheriffdom of Kincardine in 1413 and 1417. He was present at a provincial council of the Scottish church at Perth on 16 July 1419. Historian D. E. R. Watt has summarised that "though he did visit Brechin from time to time and [did] take some interest in [the] organisation and property of his see, it does not add up to much".

His appearance at the exchequer audit of May 1425 was his last in the records. By 7 June 1426, when his successor John de Crannach was provided to the see at the papal court, he must have been dead for some time. He was probably dead by the exchequer audit of 15 April, when John de Scheves was acting as Clerk of the Rolls and Register (an indication that Bishop Forrester was no longer available to perform this office).

== Notes ==
Catholic Church titles
Preceded by David of Mar	Archdeacon of Lothian; 1383 × 1386–1386 × 1390	Succeeded by James Borthwick
Preceded by Radulf Wilde	Subdean of Brechin; 1372 × 1400–1407	Succeeded by Walter de Lichton
Preceded by Stephen de Cellario	Bishop of Brechin; 1407 – 1425 or 1426	Succeeded by John de Crannach
