= George Shoreswood =

Scottish bishop

Nicholas
- Bishop of Brechin
- See: Brechin
- In office: 1454–1462 × 1463
- Predecessor: John Crannach
- Successor: Patrick Graham
- Previous post(s): Rector of Coulter; Vicar of Haddington; Chancellor of Dunkeld

Orders
- Consecration: 8 March – 1 July 1454

Personal details
- Born: unknown unknown
- Died: 1462 × 1463 unknown

George Shoreswood or Schoriswood (died 1462 × 1463), was a prelate active in the Kingdom of Scotland during the 15th century. He appears to have been of English-speaking origin, from the family of Bedshiel in Berwickshire.

Shoreswood was a clerk of William Douglas, 8th Earl of Douglas in 1446, holding the rectorship of Coulter in Clydesdale. After the death of Earl James in February 1452, he became a royal clerk. He also became vicar of Haddington at some point, holding the office until becoming a bishop in 1454.

He was granted crown presentation to the Dunkeld chancellorship; this happened between 5 July 1451 and 22 June 1452, following the death of former chancellor Richard Clapham. George took possession soon afterward. He was involved in litigation in the papal curia with two other claimants to the office, John MacDonald and Thomas Penven, but still held the office when appointed bishop of Brechin on 8 March 1454. He was still chancellor on 20 March, most likely giving the position up shortly before or else upon his consecration as bishop later in the year (sometime before 1 July).

Bishop George was auditor in the Exchequer at various points during the second half of 1454. He served as Chancellor of Scotland between 1457 and 1460. He went on a pilgrimage to Durham, receiving a safe-conduct for himself and 40 attendants in 1459. He is recorded as bishop for the last time on 11 November 1462, but died before 28 March 1463 when the see was granted to his successor Patrick Graham.

Catholic Church titles
Preceded by George Clapham	Chancellor of Dunkeld; 1451 × 1452–1454	Succeeded by John MacDonald
Preceded by John de Cranach	Bishop of Brechin; 1454–1462 × 1463	Succeeded by Patrick Graham
