= John de Cheam =

- Bishop of Glasgow
- Church: Roman Catholic Church
- Diocese: Glasgow
- Appointed: 1259
- Term ended: 1267
- Predecessor: Nicholas de Moffat
- Successor: Nicholas de Moffat
- Previous post(s): Archdeacon of Bath

Personal details
- Died: 1268; Meaux, Kingdom of France

John de Cheam [Cheyam] was a 13th-century English cleric who became Bishop of Glasgow. Before attaining Glasgow, he had previously been the archdeacon of Bath and a papal chaplain. In the summer of 1259, after the quashing of the election of Nicholas de Moffat, Pope Adrian IV provided John to the see, and he was consecrated soon after at the Roman court without any consultation with the Glasgow canons. His election was opposed by King Alexander III of Scotland, who sent a protest to Pope Alexander IV. The pope refused to revoke the decision, but promised to make John render fealty to the king. Bishop John arrived in Scotland in the year 1260. When the mother of the king, Marie de Coucy, fled from her second husband John de Brienne (a.k.a. Jean d'Acre), the Grand Butler of the King of France and the son of John de Brienne, King of Jerusalem, Bishop John was used by King Alexander to reconcile them. Bishop John was one of the witnesses to the Treaty of Perth on 2 July 1266. However, his good relations with the king did not make up for the resentment felt by the Glasgow canons at an outside appointee, and John eventually resigned his see in 1267, and went to France. He died at Meaux the following year, and was buried there.

Religious titles
Preceded by Nicholas de Moffat (unconsecrated); William de Bondington	Bishop of Glasgow; 1259–1267	Succeeded by Nicholas de Moffat (unconsecrated); William Wishart (unconsecrated); Robert Wishart
