= William de Bondington =

Roman Catholic bishop

- Bishop of Glasgow
- Church: Roman Catholic Church
- Diocese: Glasgow
- Appointed: 1232/1233
- Term ended: 10 November 1258
- Predecessor: Walter Capellanus
- Successor: Nicholas de Moffat
- Previous post(s): Archdeacon of Lothian

Orders
- Consecration: 11 September 1233 by Andreas de Moravia

Personal details
- Died: 10 November 1258
- Buried: Melrose Abbey

William de Bondington († 1258) was a 13th-century Chancellor of Scotland and a bishop of Glasgow.

== Biography ==
Before becoming bishop, William was rector of Eddleston, a prebendary of Glasgow, and archdeacon of Lothian. From the year 1231, William was Chancellor of Scotland. He was elected Bishop of Glasgow sometime between 19 May 1232 and June 1233. (A royal Charter of 5 October 1232 records him only as Chancellor and not yet as bishop-elect.) On 11 September 1233, he was consecrated at Glasgow Cathedral by Andreas de Moravia, Bishop of Moray. William de Bondington was a frequent witness to royal charters, and one of the most important royal officials in the reign of King Alexander II. He probably remained chancellor until the latter king's death in 1249, and remained on the royal council until 1255. In 1240, William and David de Bernham, Bishop of St Andrews, were summoned to Rome by Pope Gregory IX, in order to attend a general council. The latter, however, did not go ahead, and the bishops returned home. On 18 July 1244, William sanctioned the foundation of Crossraguel Abbey in Carrick, after Donnchadh, Earl of Carrick had given donations to Paisley Abbey for this purpose, but Paisley Abbey had merely founded a chapel and kept the balance. Bishop William's episcopate saw continued work on the cathedral and significant expansion in the resources of the diocese. William was a liberal benefactor to his clergy. William died on 10 November 1258 and was buried in Melrose Abbey three days later.

William had a residence near the village of Ancrum in the Scottish borders although its precise location has been investigated for some years.

Catholic Church titles
Preceded by Walter	Bishop of Glasgow; 1232/3–1258	Succeeded by Nicholas de Moffat (unconsecrated); John de Cheyam
