= High Friarside =

Village in County Durham, England

Coordinates: 54°54′14″N 1°44′44″W

High Friarside is a village in County Durham, England classified as a suburban area. It is situated a short distance to the west of Burnopfield.

The placename is variously recorded as Frevejohanside, Frerejonside, and Freresyde meaning "Friar (John’s) hill". There are also localities called Low Friarside and Middle Friarside.

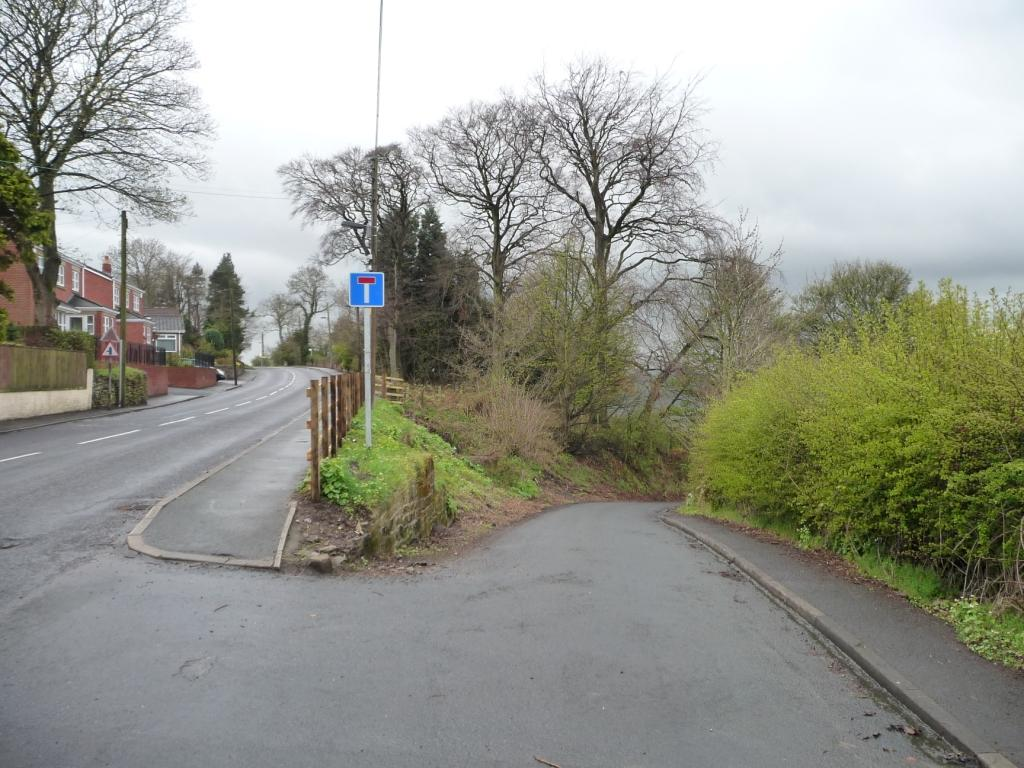
From High Friarside to Low

At Low Friarside there are the ruins of a chapel. The date of the foundation of the chapel (sometimes referred to as a chantry or house, and possibly connected to a hospital) is unknown. However, it was in existence in 1312 when Bishop Kellawe collated John Eryum to 'the house, chapel, or chantry of Friarside (Frerejohanside) near Derwent.' In Bishop Hatfield's Survey (1383), the warden of the chantry of Friarside held a messuage and 22 acres of land in Wolsingham. In 1439 Bishop Neville appropriated it with all its revenues to the chantry of Farnacres after that site had suffered floods and a decrease in finances.

A list of masters of the chantry/chapel include, John Eryum, 1312; Richard de Egglescliffe, 1376 (?) William Thorp, 1376; Oswald, bishop of Whithorn, d. 1417; Robert Frend, 1418; William Cross, 1422; and, John Gare, 1423.

The hospital seems to have been demolished in 1450. However, the chapel survived and with the closure of the chantries in England 1548 it was recorded that Friarside still had one bell perhaps indicating continued usage.

At Middle Friarside there is moat with multiple embankments and ditches.

There was a coal mine, South Garesfield Colliery, also known as Friarside Colliery and North Lintz Colliery that operated 1865-1960 (located to the west of Low Friarside.
