= Stephen de Dunnideer =

Stephen de Dunnideer [Donydouer, Donydoir, Dundore, Dundemore, Dunsmore ] (died 1317) was a 14th-century bishop-elect of Glasgow. He was elected by the canons of the see of Glasgow either in December 1316 or early 1317. After election, he travelled to the Holy See to receive consecration, but the pope, Pope John XXII rejected his election under pressure from King Edward II of England; he died at Paris on his return home. A letter dated 13 July 1317 was sent by King Edward thanking the pope for refusing to accept the election. Stephen made his way to return to Scotland, but died en route in the French city of Paris. Stephen must have died before 18 August, for on that date, the pope had already learned of his death, and announced that he would appoint a bishop himself. The Glasgow canons elected John de Lindesay to succeed him without knowing of the papal reservation, while the pope himself provided the Englishman John de Egglescliffe to the see.

Religious titles
Preceded by Robert Wishart	Bishop of Glasgow; Elect 1317	Succeeded by John de Egglescliffe
