= Nicholas de Moffat =

Nicholas de Moffat (died 1270) was a 13th-century cleric who was twice bishop-elect of Glasgow. He had been archdeacon of Teviotdale, and was elected (actually, he was postulated) to the bishopric of Glasgow on the first occasion in early 1259. He travelled to the Holy See to become consecrated; but he did not pay the money requested of him, and his travel companions turned against him, the bishop of Dunblane perhaps aspiring to the bishopric himself. Nicholas therefore returned to Scotland unconsecrated. John de Cheyam, a papal chaplain, was appointed in his place, probably in June 1259. Bishop John seems to have been resented by his clergy, and in 1267 John resigned the see. The following year, Nicholas was elected for the second time. This time however he died before receiving consecration, sometime in the year 1270. His funeral was held in Tinigham, or Tyninghame, in East Lothian.

Religious titles
Preceded by William de Bondington	Bishop of Glasgow; Elect 1259	Succeeded by John de Cheyam
Preceded by John de Cheyam	Bishop of Glasgow; 1268–70	Succeeded by William Wishart (unconsecrated); Robert Wishart
