= Robert Montgomerie (bishop) =

Robert Montgomerie of Hessilhead (c. 1530–1609) was a prominent Scottish clergyman in post-Reformation Scotland who served as Protestant Archbishop of Glasgow from 1581 to 1588.

== Life ==
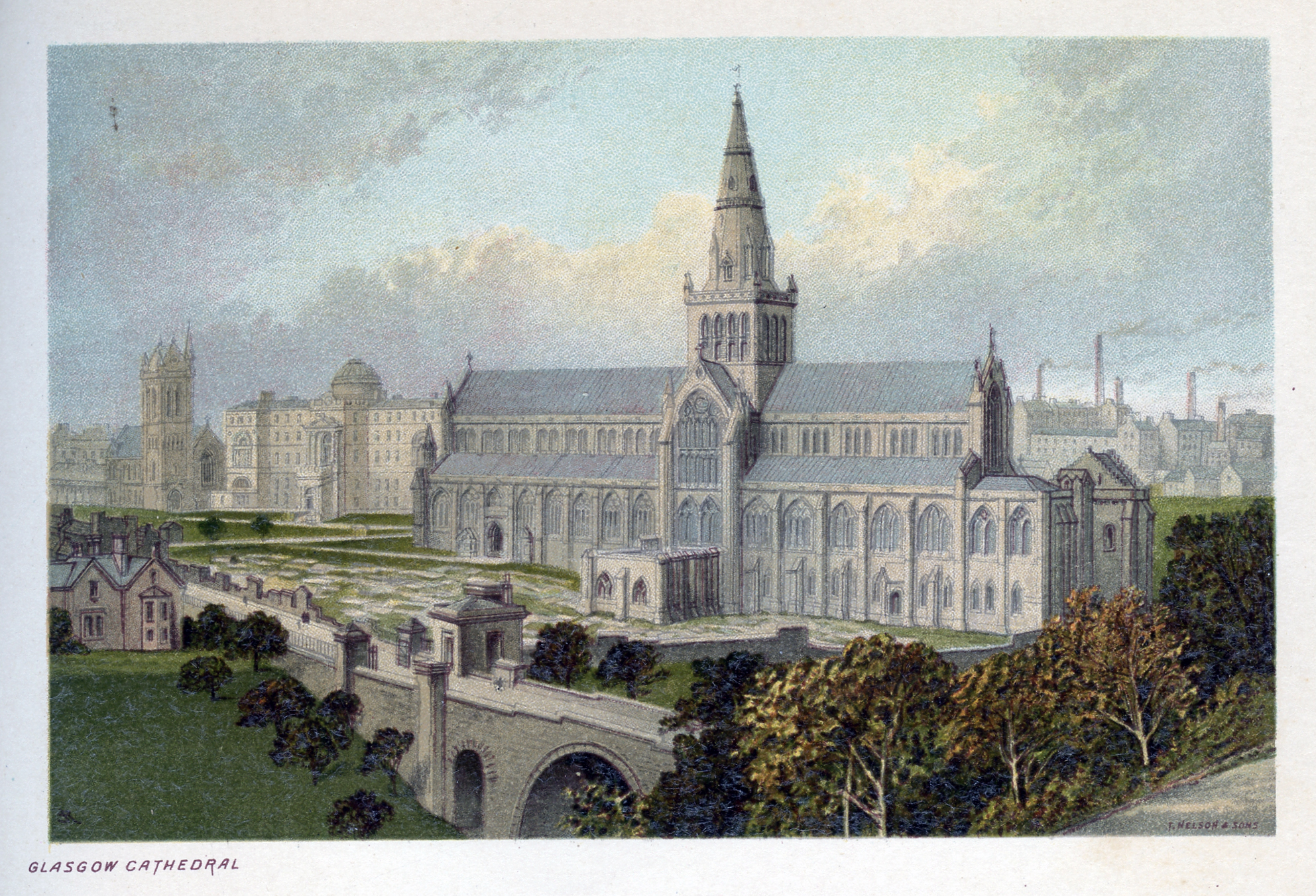
Glasgow Cathedral

He was the third son of Hugh Montgomerie of Hessilhead and his wife, Margaret Houston of Houston. He was brother to the poet Alexander Montgomerie. He studied at Glasgow University and graduated MA.

At the first General Assembly of the Church of Scotland he was recognised as an apt person to preach and began a series of positions in the Church of Scotland. He served successively in Cupar (1562-1567), Dunblane (1567-1572), Stirling (1572-1581).

In 1581 he was created Archbishop of Glasgow in place of the late James Boyd of Trochrig. Montgomerie was succeeded in 1588 by William Erskine (archbishop)

He was minister of Symington from 1587 to 1589 when he translated to Stewarton. He passed his role to his son-in-law in 1607. He was also archdeacon of Argyll in this period.

He died at Stewarton on 25 March 1609.

== Family ==
He was married to Beatrice Jamieson and had several children:

- John Montgomerie of Sevenakers
- Robert Mongomerie
- Elizabeth, married Rev James Montgomery of Dunlop
- A second daughter, married Rev William Castlelaw, Montgomerie's successor at Stewarton.
