= John Porterfield =

John Porterfield (fl. 1571–1571x3) was a Scottish prelate in the sixteenth-century. A mysterious figure, he emerges in 1571 as the successor to James Beaton II as Archbishop of Glasgow. He was described by Robert Keith as "a kind of titular bishop", propped up by the establishment for nominal purposes during a period of disorder. Porterfield probably held on to the archbishopric into 1572, but he disappeared from the records thereafter. In late 1573, James Boyd of Trochrig became new Archbishop of Glasgow. Porterfield is possibly the John Porterfield, minister of Ayr, who died in 1604 to be succeeded by John Welsh.

== Notes ==
Religious titles
Preceded by James Beaton	Archbishop of Glasgow; 1571–1571 x 1573	Succeeded by James Boyd
