= John de Lindsay =

- Bishop of Glasgow
- Church: Roman Catholic Church
- Diocese: Glasgow
- Appointed: 15 March 1323
- Term ended: 1335
- Predecessor: John de Egglescliffe
- Successor: John Wishart
- Previous post: Canon of Glasgow

Orders
- Consecration: 9 October 1323 by Vital du Four

Personal details
- Died: 1335

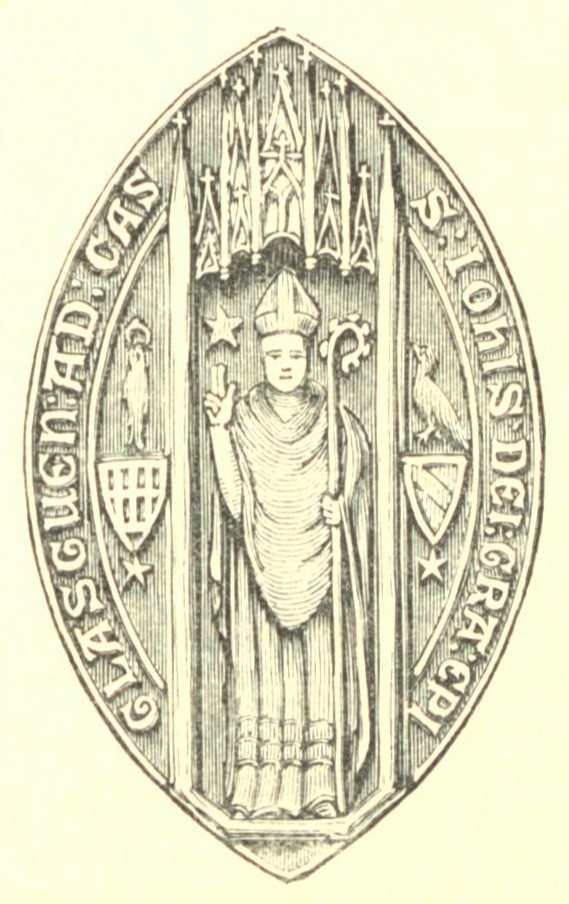
John de Lindsay seal, c. 1325.

John de Lindsay (Lindesay) or simply John Lindsay was a 14th-century bishop of Glasgow. He was from the Lindsay family, a family of Anglo-AxoNorman origin who had settled in Scotland, and in the 14th century were noted for their crusading exploits, a feature which earned them the patronage of the Scottish kings (esp. David II and Robert III) and who by the end of the century were elevated to comital status with the creation of the Earldom of Crawford. The Lindsay arms are depicted in Bishop John de Lindesay's seal. So also are the de Coucy arms, probably suggesting he had some sort of connection with this great French noble family. John was the son of Sir Philip de Lyndesay of the barony of Staplegorton, Philip was the son of John Lindsay of Wauchope, the 13th century Chamberlain of King Alexander III.

John was a canon of Glasgow before becoming bishop. After the death of bishop-elect Stephen de Donydouer in August 1317, the Glasgow canons elected John de Lindesay as bishop. However, they apparently did not know that the pope, Pope John XXII, had already reserved the see for his own appointment. The pope himself provided the Englishman John de Egglescliffe to the see, making John de Lindsay's election null and void. The latter, however was regarded as a pro-English appointment, and the Kingdom of Scotland at this time was at war with the Kingdom of England. Egglescliffe hence never took possession of this see, but in March 1323, was translated to the bishopric of Connor in Ireland. Upon this translation, the pope commanded Vitalis de Furno, Bishop of Albano, to provide de Lindsay to the bishopric of Glasgow. John de Lindesay was probably consecrated at Avignon before 10 October 1323.

Bishop John de Lindsay was an active participant in the politics of the day. He frequently attended parliamentary gatherings, and offered his support to both King Robert de Brus and Edward de Balliol. Although the Lanercost Chronicle places his death in 1337, he actually died around 15 August 1335. He seems to have died when a Flemish ship upon which he was being transported was captured by English pirates. Walsingham's account is that he was wounded in the head, whilst Lanercost says that the bishop starved himself upon capture. He was buried at a place called "Wytsande", an unknown location somewhere in England.

Religious titles
Preceded by Stephen de Donydouer (unconsecrated); Robert Wishart	Bishop of Glasgow; Elect 1317	Succeeded by John de Egglescliffe (never took possession)
Preceded by John de Egglescliffe (never took possession)	Bishop of Glasgow; 1323–1335	Succeeded by John Wishart
