= John de Egglescliffe =

14th-century English bishop

- Bishop of Llandaff
- Church: Catholic Church
- Diocese: Llandaff
- Appointed: 20 June 1323
- Term ended: 1347
- Predecessor: John of Monmouth
- Successor: John Paschal
- Previous posts: Bishop of Connor; Bishop of Glasgow

Personal details
- Died: 1347

John de Egglescliffe (died 1347) was a 14th-century English bishop. Little is known of his personal background except that he was a Dominican friar, and that he probably came from County Durham (there is a parish called Egglescliffe there).

In early 1317, Stephen de Donydouer was elected by the canons of the see of Glasgow as bishop of Glasgow. After election, Stephen travelled to the Holy See to receive consecration, but the pope, Pope John XXII rejected his election under pressure from King Edward II of England. A letter dated 13 July 1317 was sent by King Edward thanking the pope for refusing to accept the election. On 18 August, the pope had learned of Stephen's death, and announced that he would appoint a bishop himself.

The pope instructed Nicholas Alberti, Bishop of Ostia, to appoint and consecrate the English papal penitentiary John de Ecclescliffe to the bishopric of Glasgow. This went ahead at Avignon at some point before 17 July 1318. Meanwhile, ignorant of the pope's reservation, the Glasgow canons elected John de Lindesay. As an Egglescliffe was regarded as a pro-English appointee, Egglescliffe never took possession of this see. However, John was given another see to take charge, as in March 1323 he was translated to the bishopric of Connor. This did not last long though, as he was soon translated again, this time to the bishopric of Llandaff on 20 June 1323, i.e., just three months after becoming bishop of Connor. He remained Bishop of Llandaff for twenty-four years, and died in 1347.

Religious titles
Preceded by Stephen de Donydouer (unconsecrated); Robert Wishart	Bishop of Glasgow never took possession 1318–1323	Succeeded by John de Lindesay
Preceded by ?	Bishop of Connor; 1323	Succeeded by ?
Preceded by John de Monmouth	Bishop of Llandaff; 1323–1347	Succeeded by John Paschal
