= William Rae (bishop) =

Scottish bishop

- Bishop of Glasgow
- Church: Roman Catholic Church
- Diocese: Glasgow
- Appointed: 20 February 1339
- Term ended: 27 January 1367
- Predecessor: John Wishart
- Successor: Walter Wardlaw

Orders
- Consecration: 21 February 1339 by Annibale di Ceccano

Personal details
- Died: 27 January 1367

William Rae (died 1367) was a 14th-century bishop of Glasgow. His background is obscure, although it is known that before ascending to the bishopric he was a precentor of the diocese of Glasgow. On the death of John Wishart in 1338, William was elected to the see. His election was confirmed by Pope Benedict XII, who on 11 February 1339 ordered Annibald de Ceccano, bishop of Tusculum, to consecrate William. William was consecrated at Avignon a short while later. His predecessor Wishart had been consecrated by the same man, in the same location. William's episcopate was comparatively long, and he died on 27 January 1367. He was succeeded by Walter Wardlaw.

== Glasgow Old Bridge ==
Bishop Rae's main contribution to his city was the erection of a stone bridge in around 1345 to replace an earlier wooden bridge. This bridge stood at around the same location as the current Victoria Bridge, near the bottom of the Bridgegate.

Religious titles
Preceded by John Wishart	Bishop of Glasgow; 1338/9-67	Succeeded by Walter Wardlaw
