= John Paschal =

English bishop (died 1361)

John Paschal (died 1361) was a 14th-century English bishop. Paschal, native of Suffolk, became a Carmelite friar at Ipswich. Paschal was sent to study at Cambridge University. John Paschal in 1347 was nominated bishop of Llandaff. He died on 11 October 1361.

Religious titles
Preceded by John de Egglescliffe	Bishop of Llandaff; 1347–1361	Succeeded by Rodger Cradock
