= John Wishart (bishop) =

- Bishop of Glasgow
- Church: Roman Catholic Church
- Diocese: Glasgow
- In office: 1335/6–1338
- Predecessor: John de Lindsay
- Successor: William Rae
- Previous post(s): Archdeacon of Glasgow

Orders
- Consecration: February 1337 by Annibaldo di Ceccano

Personal details
- Died: 1338

John Wishart (died 1338) was a 14th-century bishop of Glasgow. He was archdeacon of Glasgow from 1321 or earlier. After the death of Bishop John de Lindesay in 1335, John was elected to succeed him at Glasgow, and was consecrated in February 1337 at the orders of Pope Benedict XII at Avignon by Annibald de Ceccano, bishop of Tusculum. His episcopate was extremely brief. His exact death date is not known, but we know that the see was again vacant on 11 May 1338. He was succeeded by William Rae.

Religious titles
Preceded by John de Lindesay	Bishop of Glasgow; 1335/6-38	Succeeded by William Rae
