= William de Lauder =

- Bishop of Glasgow
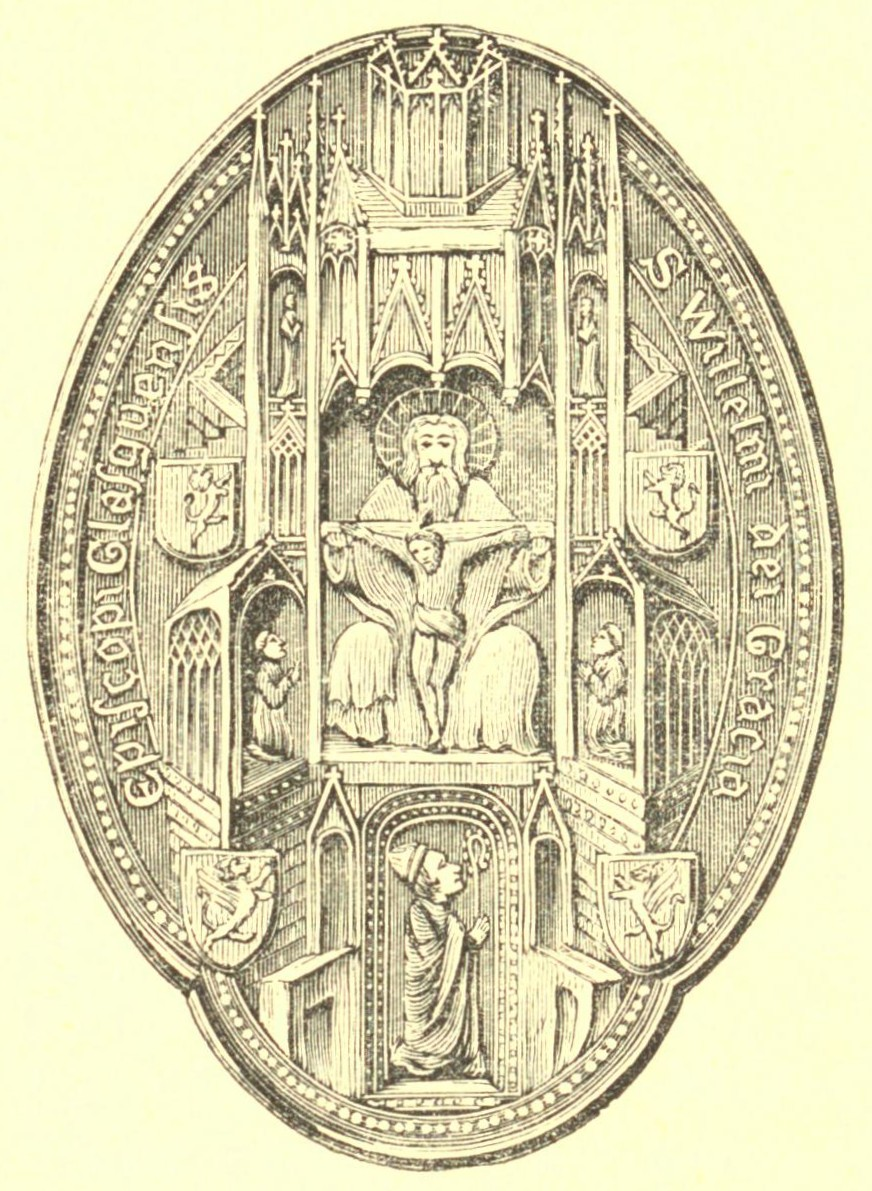
- Seal of William de Lauder
- Diocese: Glasgow
- Appointed: 9 July 1408
- Term ended: 14 June 1425
- Predecessor: Matthew de Glendonwyn
- Successor: John Cameron
- Previous post(s): Archdeacon of Lothian; 1405-1408

Personal details
- Born: c. 1380
- Died: 14 June 1425 (aged c. 45)

William de Lawedre (modern spelling: Lauder) (c. 1380 – 14 June 1425) was Bishop of Glasgow and Lord Chancellor of Scotland.

Sometimes given (wrongly) as a son of Alan de Lawedre of Haltoun, he was in fact the son of Sir Robert de Lawedre of Edrington, and The Bass, by his spouse Annabella. William was brother-German to Alexander de Lawedre, Bishop of Dunkeld.

William de Lawedre was educated at the University of Paris where he took a great interest in its affairs and eventually became Rector. He graduated with a Doctorate in Canon Law In 1392, while still at university, he was given the parish church of St. Eligius, a benefice in the gift of the Bishop, dean and chapter of St. Malo. He also appears on the Roll of the University of Angers where he spent some time studying and lecturing.

Before 1404, William de Lawedre had the Archdeaconry of Lothian conferred on him by Bishop Wardlaw of St. Andrews, as well as holding a canonry and prebend in Moray. In 1405 Lauder unsuccessfully sued in the Curia for the Precentorship of Glasgow. "Willielmus de Lawadir, Archdeacon of Lothian, accompanied by Alanus de Lawedir de Scotia" (his brother) had a safe-conduct from King Henry IV dated 18 September 1404 with another the following year.

He was 'preferred' and appointed to the bishopric of Glasgow by Avignon Pope Benedict XIII on 9 July 1408, and not by election of the Chapter. The Chapter did not challenge his selection, however, and Bishop Dowden suggests that he went to Avignon to receive consecration, returning after Martinmas the same year. This seems to be supported by an indult dated 11 July 1408 for him to be consecrated elsewhere, and it is likely that occurred in France. On 24 October, King Henry IV of England granted "William de Lawedre, Bishop of Glasgow" safe-conduct to pass through the Kingdom of England to the Kingdom of France.

Bishop William was deeply involved in the affairs of the kingdom. In 1406 he was one of the commissioners sent to Charles, King of France, in order to renew the alliance with France against the English. He attended the General Council at Perth in 1415, and from September 1420 until his death four years later, William was Lord Chancellor of Scotland. On 9 August 1423 he was named First Commissioner to treat with England for the ransom of James I, which was accomplished the following year. Another of the Commissioners was Sir Robert Lauder of Edrington, the Bishop's brother.

Bishop Lauder spent a great deal of his time continuing to build Glasgow or St Mungo's Cathedral building several portions of it, notably the crypt under the chapter house where the Lauder Arms were carved in several places. He also added the stone steeple and battlement to the already built tower and placed his arms, with a cherub for a crest, on the centre panel of the western parapet.

He was interred in the ancient (now gone) parish church of St. Mary, at Lauder, Berwickshire, and succeeded by John Cameron.

== Notes ==
Religious titles
Preceded by Matthew de Glendonwyn	Bishop of Glasgow; 1408–1425	Succeeded by John Cameron
