= Matthew de Glendonwyn =

- Bishop of Glasgow
- Church: Roman Catholic Church
- Diocese: Glasgow
- Appointed: 1387/1388
- Term ended: 10 May 1408
- Predecessor: Walter Wardlaw
- Successor: William de Lauder

Orders
- Consecration: 1387/1388

Personal details
- Died: 10 May 1408

Matthew de Glendonwyn (modern spelling Glendinning)(died 10 May 1408) was a late 14th and early 15th century bishop of Glasgow. He was elected to the see after the death of Cardinal Walter Wardlaw, his predecessor as bishop. He was elected sometime between Wardlaw's death in September and Matthew's first appearance as bishop-elect in December. Matthew was consecrated some months after his election, either in late 1387 or early 1388.

Matthew was a witness to charters of kings Robert II and Robert III, an occasional ambassador of the Scottish crown to England, and a frequent arbiter in disputes concerning various religious establishments. On 21 May 1401, he introduced a tax in his diocese to improve the deficient ornamenta of the diocese (i.e. chasubles, copes, dalmatics, etc.). According to the Martyrology of Glasgow, he died on 10 May 1408.

Religious titles
Preceded by Walter Wardlaw	Bishop of Glasgow; 1387/8-1408	Succeeded by William de Lawedre
