= Oswald of Glenluce =

Cistercian monk and bishop

Oswald, O. Cist. (died after 1417) was a Cistercian monk and bishop in the late 14th century and early 15th century. There is an Oswald Botelere (Butler) granted a safe-conduct, along with 12 others, to enter England and study at the University of Oxford, in 1365, but this Oswald Butler cannot be shown to be the same as the later Oswald of Glenluce.

The outbreak of the Western Schism meant that when Adam de Lanark, Bishop of Galloway, died in 1378, the two popes, Urban VI and Clement VII, supported alternative successors to the see. Oswald, whose earlier details are badly documented, at this point was claustral prior (deputy-abbot) of Glenluce Abbey and was elected locally to fill the vacant diocese.

Sometime after 18 April 1378, he was provided to the bishopric by Urban, and consecrated before 26 March 1379, when he received a safe-conduct from King Richard II of England to pass through England on business with Urban. He was supported by Urban, but with the Kingdom of Scotland allied to Clement, Oswald had difficulties retaining possession of his see. After Ingram de Ketenis rejected his own provision to the diocese by Clement, the Franciscan friar and staunch Clementine Thomas de Rossy became Oswald's rival.

It is likely that Oswald had possession for a brief period, and while Oswald did appeal to Clement to uphold his election, he had lost the litigation with de Rossy by 21 October 1381. The next years are unclear, but on 5 May 1388, Richard II issued Oswald "bishop of Galway" a safe-conduct into England because Oswald had to flee Galloway to preserve his life.

Oswald spent the remainder of his days in England, acting as a suffragan of the Archbishop of York, carrying out various duties on his behalf; he is found as a suffragan of Cardinal Thomas Langley, Bishop of Durham, in 1406 and in 1416. He is recorded as the master of Friarside Hospital. While his death is unrecorded, he died sometime in 1417 or after, as the last notice of his existence occurs between September and December 1417.

== Notes ==
Religious titles
| Preceded by Adam de Lanark | Bishop of Galloway (elect); 1378 × 1379 | Succeeded by Thomas de Rossy |
| Preceded by Adam de Lanark | Bishop of Galloway (anti-bishop); 1378 × 1379–1417 × | Succeeded by ? |
