= William Erskine (bishop) =

Protestant Archbishop of Glasgow (1585 - 1587)

William Erskine (c. 1555–1639) was a prominent Scottish clergyman in post-Reformation Scotland who served as Protestant Archbishop of Glasgow from 1585 to 1587.

== Life ==
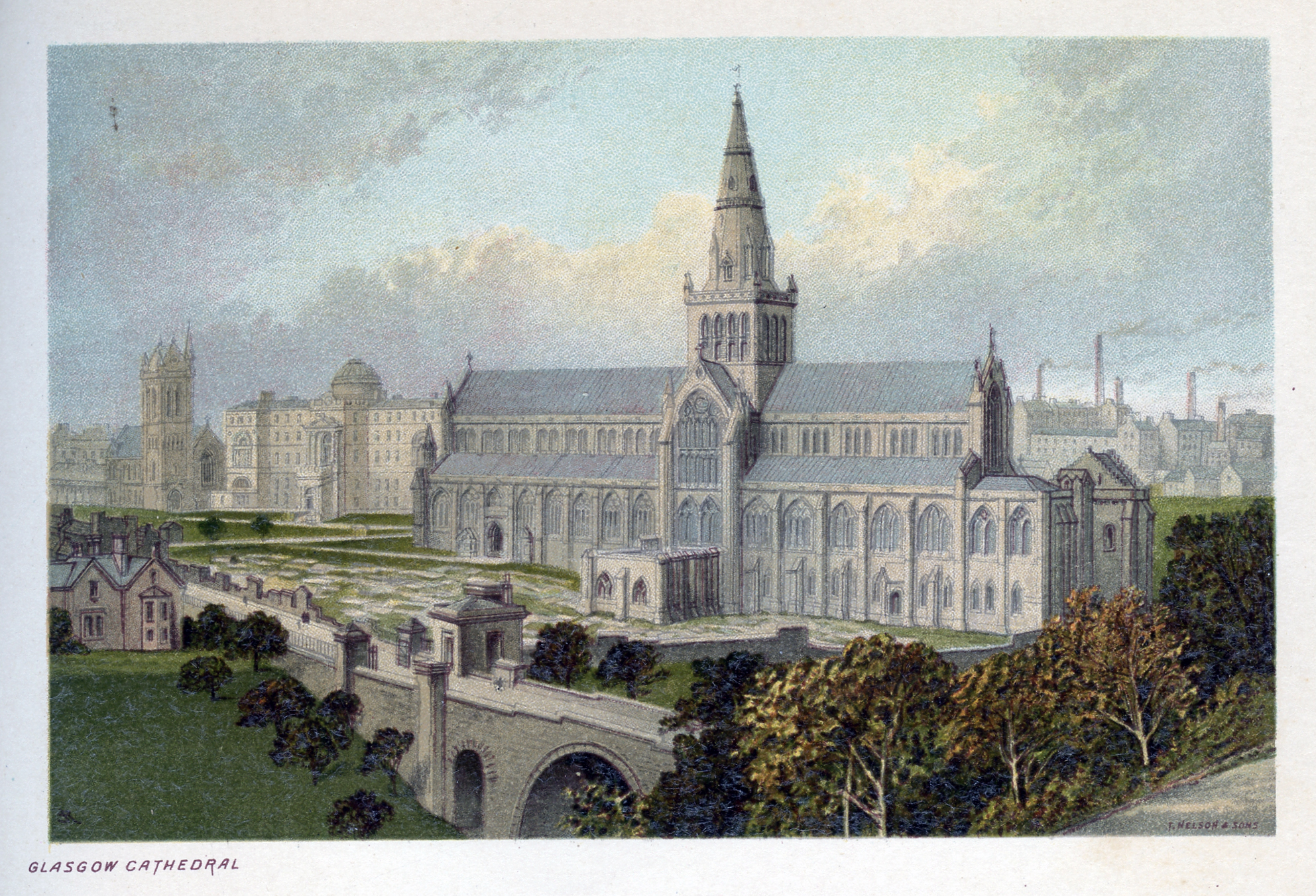
Glasgow Cathedral

He was the third son of James Erskine of Little Sauchie and his wife Christian Stirling.

In 1575 he was parson of Campsie and later Commendator at Paisley Abbey. During his time at the Abbey he organised the building of a well, which was known as the Balgownie well, due to his kinsman Erskine of Balgownie.

On 21 December 1585 he was appointed Archbishop of Glasgow by King James VI in place of Robert Montgomerie. He was removed by the king in 1587 and replaced by William Stewart. He returned to Campsie in 1588 but continued to hold the title of Bishop until 1594.

He was also Chancellor of the University of Glasgow 1585 to 1587.

He died on 12 February 1639 in the Covent Garden district of London.

== Family ==
He married Joanna Erskine.
