= Adam de Lanark =

Scottish Dominican friar and prelate

- Bishop of Galloway
- Church: Roman Catholic Church
- See: Diocese of Galloway
- In office: 1363–1378
- Predecessor: Thomas
- Successor: Thomas de Rossy

Orders
- Ordination: before 1355
- Consecration: before 2 January 1364

Personal details
- Born: unknown Probably Scotland (Lanark ?)
- Died: 1378; Avignon

Adam de Lanark, O.P. (died 1378) was a 14th-century Scottish Dominican friar and prelate. Possibly from a Lanark burgess family, he was a Dominican and a priest by 1356, and by 1364 was styled Magister, indicating the completion of a long university education. He first appears in the sources, c. 1355/6 as a confessor of King David II of Scotland; he retained this royal position through the 1350s and into the 1360s; Adam received a number of English safe-conducts (between May 1356 and August 1357) to visit King David, who for a time was a prisoner in England.

Adam spent a great deal of time at the papal court in Avignon, France. He was there on 29 January 1359, as a proctor for Patrick Leuchars, Bishop of Brechin. He was sent there again at some point by the crown, receiving payment for this trip sometime between August 1362 and November 1364; he is not styled "bishop elect", meaning that this trip must have occurred before 1363. In 1363, Adam de Lanark was elected Bishop of Galloway and received papal provision to the vacant bishopric on 17 November 1363. He was consecrated by 2 January 1364. While seeking confirmation at the papal court, he probably presented a roll of petitions on behalf of King David II and did receive a number of faculties in order to grant dispensations in the bishopric of Galloway.

Bishop Adam's return to Scotland is signalled by the grant of safe-conduct through England issued to him on 20 February. Sometime before 25 January 1365, he was in Galloway witnessing a charter of Thomas Fleming, Earl of Wigtown. He was a frequent attender of royal councils and parliaments until 1371, when his patron David II died and was replaced on the throne by David II's long-time rival, Robert Stewart, Earl of Strathearn, who became Robert II of Scotland. Bishop Adam is thereafter a harder figure to trace, and little more is known about his activities besides the fact that he is said to have died at the papal court in Avignon during the vacancy of the papacy; that is, Bishop Adam died between the death of Pope Gregory XI on 27 March 1378 and the consecration of Avignon Pope Clement VII on the following 31 October.

== Notes ==
Religious titles
Preceded by Thomas	Bishop of Galloway; 1363–1378	Succeeded by Oswald; Ingram de Ketenis; Consecrated: Thomas de Rossy
