= Walter Capellanus =

Roman Catholic bishop

- Bishop of Glasgow
- Church: Roman Catholic Church
- Diocese: Glasgow
- Appointed: 7 December 1207
- Term ended: 1232
- Predecessor: Florence of Holland
- Successor: William de Bondington

Orders
- Consecration: 2 November 1208

Personal details
- Died: 1232

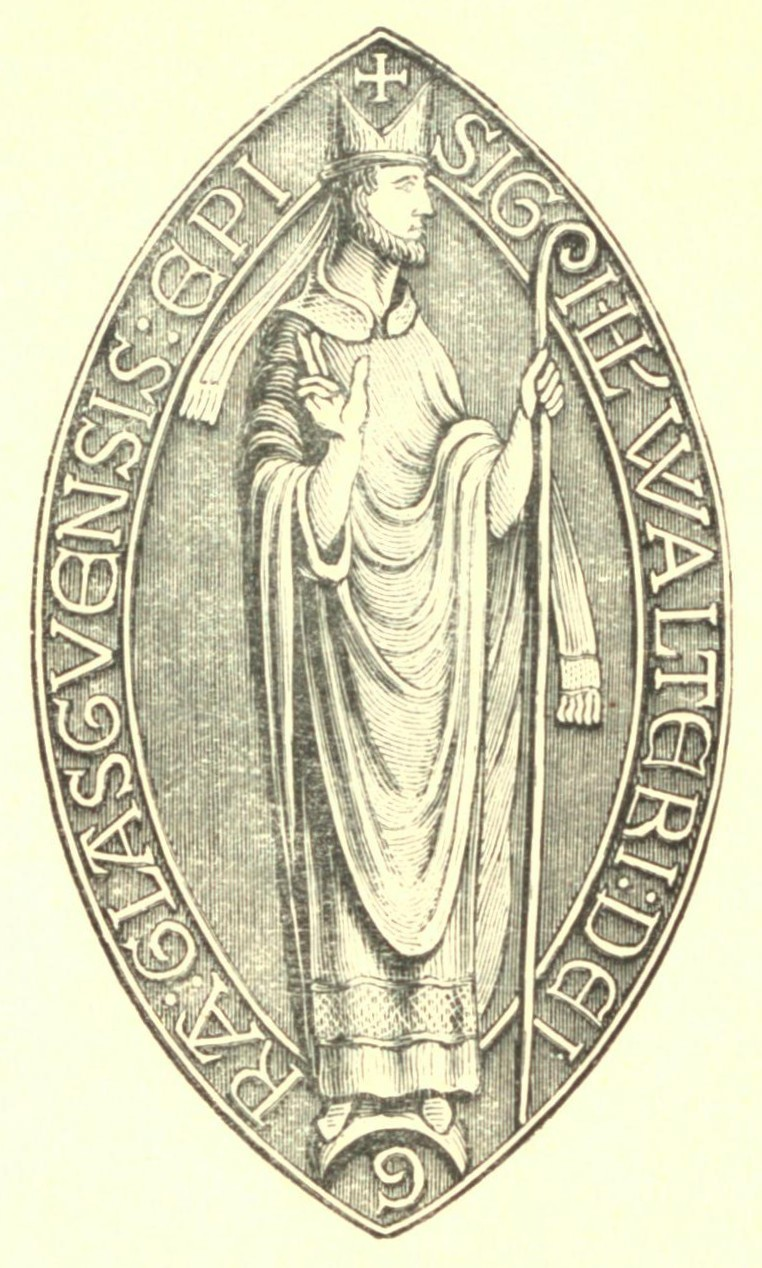
Walter Capellanus - seal, 1227

Walter Capellanus was a prominent Roman Catholic bishop and political figure in the Kingdom of Scotland during the reigns of William the Lion and Alexander II.

== Early career ==
Walter Capellanus began his clerical career as the chaplain (capellanus) to King William the Lion. His close connection to the royal court helped him rise through the ecclesiastical ranks. In 1207, following the resignation of Bishop Florence, Walter was elected Bishop of Glasgow with royal backing. He was consecrated on 2 November 1208.

== Bishop of Glasgow ==
Walter played a key role in expanding the influence of the Church in Glasgow. He secured various privileges for the city, including a charter in 1226 that revoked the right of the burgh of Rutherglen to levy tolls in Glasgow, significantly benefiting Glasgow's merchants.

Under his leadership, significant progress was made in the construction of Glasgow Cathedral. Notable developments during his tenure include the extension of the nave and the construction of the south-west door and the entrance to the Blacader Aisle.

== Papal involvement and diplomatic missions ==
Walter was deeply involved in church diplomacy. He attended the Fourth Council of the Lateran in 1215, representing Scotland alongside the bishops of St Andrews and Moray. In 1218, he traveled to Rome with the bishops of Moray and Caithness to obtain absolution for the excommunication imposed on King Alexander II and the Kingdom of Scotland by the papal legate, Guala Bicchieri. The mission was successful, and absolution was granted by Pope Honorius III.

== Controversies ==
In 1219, Walter faced accusations of uncanonical behavior. A canon of Glasgow, Master William, alleged that Walter had bribed the royal chamberlain, Philip de Valognes, with 100 merks and promised more payments to the queen in exchange for the bishopric of Glasgow. Additionally, Walter was accused of nepotism and maintaining an immoral household. However, an investigation led by the papal legate Pandulf Verraccio did not lead to his removal, and Walter continued as bishop.

== Contributions to monastic communities ==
Walter was also involved in supporting other religious institutions. On 19 May 1232, he granted a charter to Kelso Abbey, a prominent Tironensian monastery, which reflected his broader involvement in the Scottish religious community.

== Death and legacy ==
Walter Capellanus died in 1232, shortly after his charter to Kelso Abbey. He left a lasting legacy through his contributions to the construction of Glasgow Cathedral and his diplomatic efforts on behalf of the Scottish church. He was succeeded by William de Bondington.

Religious titles
| Preceded by Florence (unconsecrated); William de Malveisin | Bishop of Glasgow; 1207/8–32 | Succeeded by William de Bondington |
