= James Beaton (archbishop of Glasgow) =

Scottish archbishop (1517–1603)

The Most Reverend James Beaton
- Archbishop of Glasgow
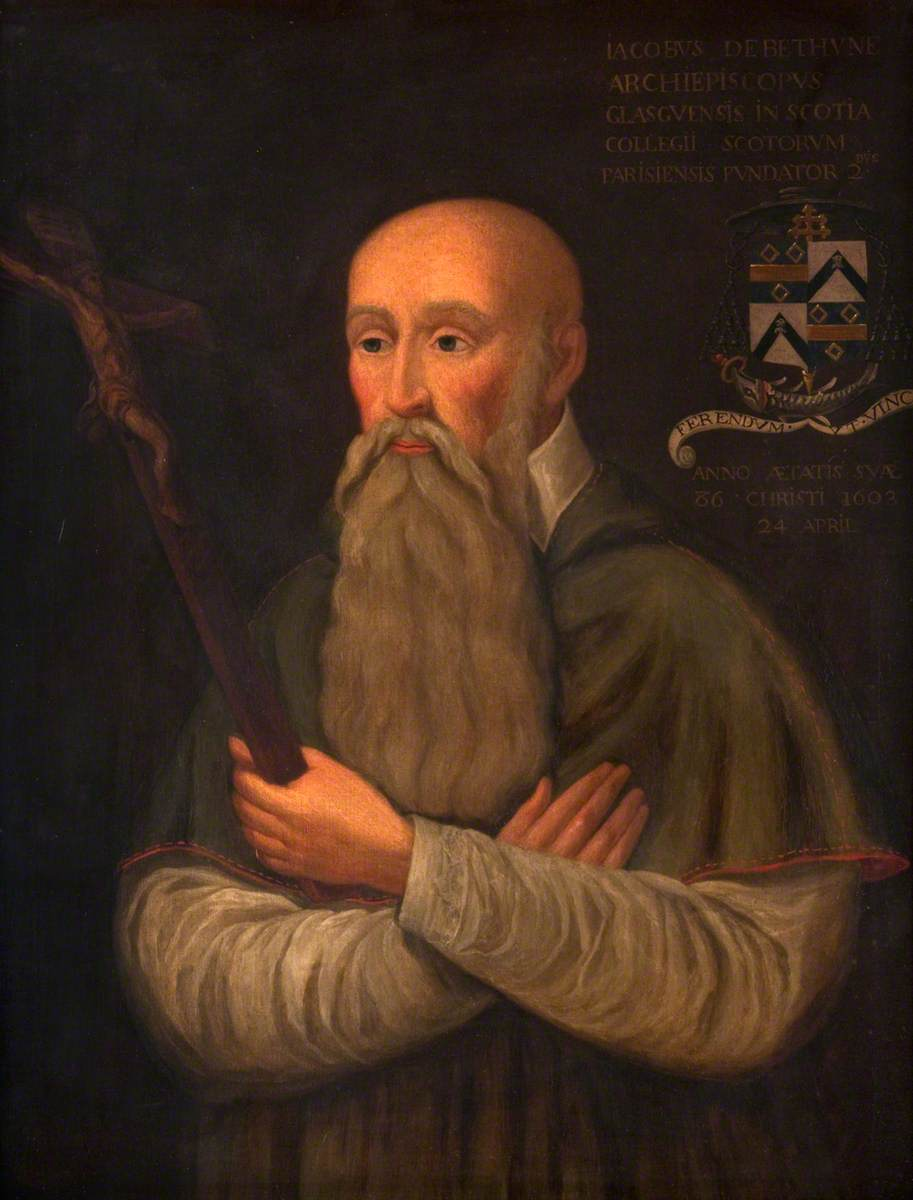
- Church: Roman Catholic Church
- Archdiocese: Glasgow
- Appointed: 4 September 1551
- In office: 1551–1571; 1598–1603
- Predecessor: Alexander Gordon
- Successor: John Porterfield

Orders
- Ordination: 17 July 1552 (deacon); 20 July 1552 (priest) by Borso Merli (priest)
- Consecration: 28 August 1552 by Giovanni Giacomo Barba

Personal details
- Born: c. 1517
- Died: 24/25 April 1603 (aged 86) Paris, Kingdom of France
- Parents: James Beaton of Balfarg
- Motto: Latin: Ferendum ut vincas

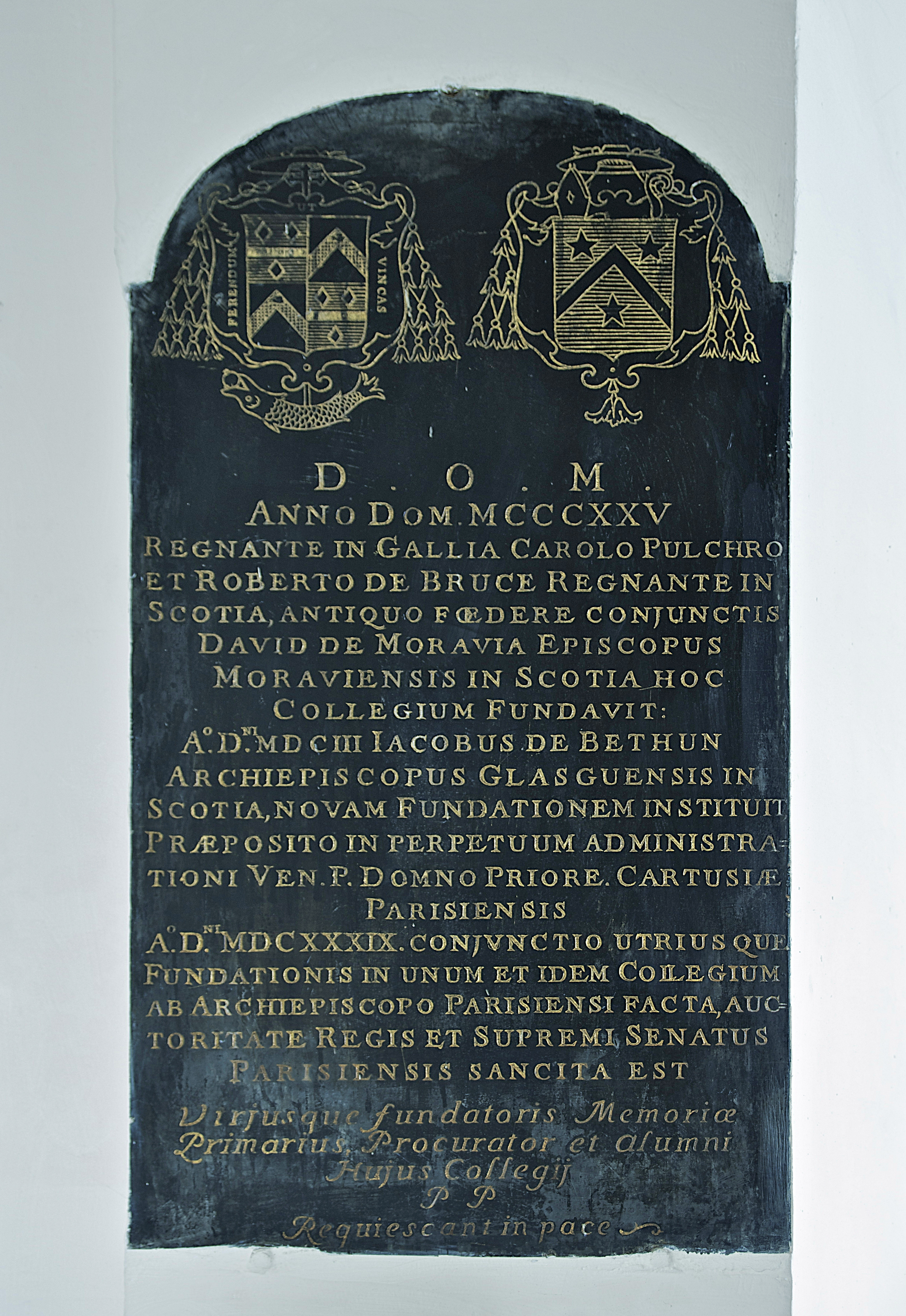
In the chapel of the Scots College in Paris, a plaque relating the relationship between the college and the archbishop, with his Coat of Arms at left.

James Beaton (c. 1517 – 24/25 April 1603) was a 16th-century archbishop of Glasgow. He served both before and after the Reformation when his title was reinstated by King James VI in 1598.

== Life ==
He was the son of James Beaton of Auchmuty and Balfarg (a younger son of John Beaton of Balfour) and nephew to Cardinal David Beaton. James Beaton was educated at the University of Paris, which he entered in the 1530s at the age of 14.

On the resignation of the archbishop-elect Alexander Gordon, the archbishopric of Glasgow became vacant. Despite not being yet in priests' orders, on 4 September 1551, at the request of Marie de Guise, Pope Julius III provided Beaton to the archbishopric of Glasgow. He was consecrated on Sunday 28 August 1552 at Rome by the bishops of Abruzzo, Nevers and Fondi. For eight troublous years he administered the affairs of his diocese and stood faithfully by the queen-regent, Marie de Guise, in her dealings with the disaffected Protestant nobles. In March, 1559, he was at the provincial council at Edinburgh summoned by the primate, Archbishop Hamilton — the last assembly of the kind which was to meet in Scotland for three hundred and twenty-six years. The events of 1560, the treaty of alliance with England against France, the commencement of the work of destruction of cathedrals and monasteries, and, finally, the death of the queen-regent, no doubt actuated Beaton in his resolve to quit the distracted kingdom. He repaired to Paris, where he took a number of the muniments and registers of his diocese, and much church plate and other treasures, which he deposited in the Scots College there.

Mary, Queen of Scots, immediately appointed him her ambassador at the French Court, and he remained both until her forced abdication in 1567. He was her most faithful friend and adviser during the rest of her life. He did not hesitate, after the murder of Darnley, to inform her frankly of the dark suspicions attaching to her, and the necessity of the assassins being punished. On the 15 February 1574, Beaton's name appears at the head of the list of the Roman prelates and clergy declared outlaws and rebels by the Scottish Privy Council; but he nevertheless continued to enjoy in his exile the favour of the young king (James VI) who, about 1586, appointed him, as the late sovereign had done, ambassador at Paris. Beaton held several benefices in France, including the income of the Abbey De la Sie, in Poitou, and the treasurership of St. Hilary of Poitiers. His intimate association with the House of Guise had naturally led him to join with the League against Henry IV, and on its dissolution he was threatened with banishment; but by the intervention of Cardinals Bourbon and Sully and of the king himself, he was allowed to remain in France. Perhaps the most remarkable testimony to the respect felt for his character in Scotland is to be found in the fact that in 1598, nearly forty years after the overthrow of the ancient Church, the archbishop was formally restored, by an act of the Scottish Parliament, to all his "heritages, honours, dignities, and benefices, notwithstanding that he has never acknowledged the religion professed within the realm". He survived to witness, a month before his death, the union of the English and Scottish crowns under King James. On either the 24 or 25 April 1603, when James was actually on his way to London to take possession of his new kingdom, the archbishop died in Paris, on the eighty-sixth year of his age, and half a century after his episcopal consecration.

Beaton had lived in Paris for forty-three years, and had been Scottish ambassador to five successive kings of France. He was buried in the church of St. John Lateran at Paris, his funeral being attended by a great gathering of prelates, nobles, and common people. The poetical inscription on his tomb eulogizes him, in the exaggerated language of the times, as the greatest bishop and preacher of his age in the whole world. A sounder estimate of his worth is that of his Protestant successor in the See of Glasgow, Spottiswoode, who describes him as "a man honourably disposed, faithful to his queen while she lived and to the king her son; a lover of his country, and liberal to all his countrymen". No breath of scandal, in a scandalous age, ever attached to the honour of his name or the purity of his private life. Beaton left his property, including the archives of the Diocese of Glasgow, and a great mass of important correspondence, to the Scots College in Paris. Some of these documents had already been deposited by him in the Carthusian monastery in the same city. In the stress of the French Revolution many of these valuable manuscripts were packed in barrels and sent to St. Omers. These have unfortunately disappeared, but the papers left in the college were afterwards brought safely to Scotland, and are now preserved at the Scottish Catholic Archives, Columba House, Edinburgh.

Religious titles
Preceded by Alexander Gordon	Archbishop of Glasgow; 1551/1552–1571*; *He was restored as nominal bishop in 1598	Succeeded by John Porterfield
