= Chantenay-Villedieu =

- Commune
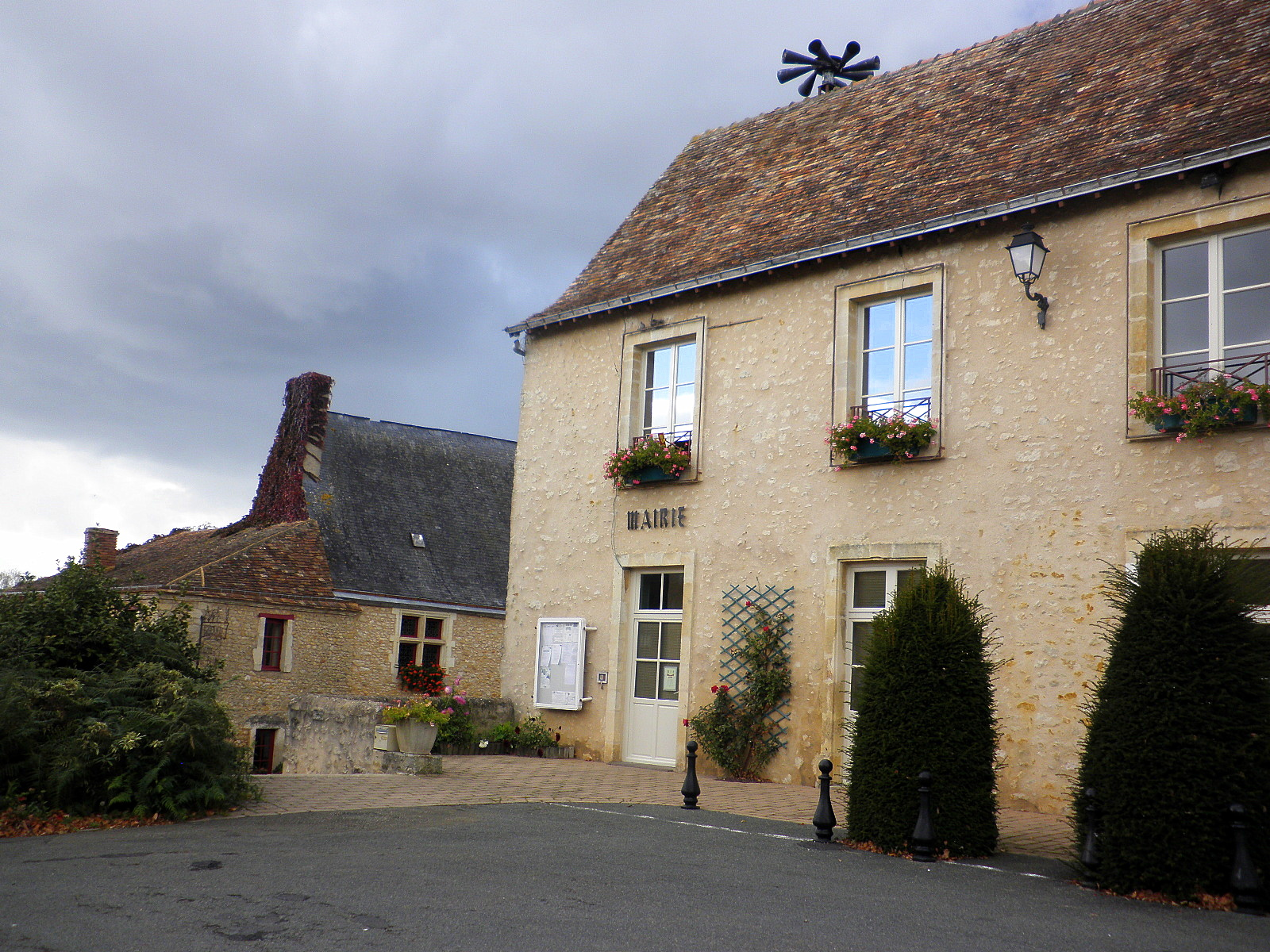
- Town hall

- Coat of arms
- Location of Chantenay-Villedieu
- Location within France Location within Pays de la Loire
- Coordinates: 47°55′18″N 0°09′36″W
- Country: France
- Region: Pays de la Loire
- Department: Sarthe
- Arrondissement: La Flèche
- Canton: Loué
- Intercommunality: Loué-Brûlon-Noyen

Government
  - Mayor (2020–2026): Régis Cerbelle
- Area^{1}: 27.74 km^{2} (10.71 sq mi)
- Highest elevation: 101 m (331 ft)
- Lowest elevation: 35 m (115 ft)
- Population (2023): 807
  - Density: 29.1/km^{2} (75.3/sq mi)
- Demonym(s): Chantenaysien, Chantenaysienne
- Time zone: UTC+01:00 (CET)
  - Summer (DST): UTC+02:00 (CEST)
- INSEE/Postal code: 72059 /72430
- ^{1} French Land Register data, which excludes lakes, ponds, glaciers > 1 km^{2} (0.386 sq mi or 247 acres) and river estuaries.

Chantenay-Villedieu (French pronunciation: [ʃɑ̃tnɛ vildjø]) is a commune in the Sarthe department in the region of Pays de la Loire in north-western France.

== Places and monuments ==
- The priory Saint Jean-Baptiste
- Lieu: center market town, place of the town hall.
- Ancient priory founded by the monks of the abbey of the Dressmaking of Mans (fine 11th or the beginning of the 12th century), occupied by Benedictines until 1412.

== See also ==
- Communes of the Sarthe department
