= Archdeacon of Lothian =

The Archdeacon of Lothian was the head of the Archdeaconry of Lothian, a sub-division of the Diocese of St Andrews. The position was one of the most important positions within the medieval Scottish church; because of his area's large population and high number of parish churches, the Archdeacon of Lothian may have exercised more power than many Scottish bishops before the decline in archdiaconal powers after the 13th century.

== List of Archdeacons of Lothian ==
- Thorald, 1144-1165
- Andrew, 1165-1179 x 1184
- William de Malveisin, 1189 x 1194-1199
- John de Leicester, 1200-1212
- William de Bosco, 1214-1231
- William de Bondington, x 1233
- William de Maule, 1235-1251
- Thomas de Carnoto (or Charteris) 1260 x 1262-1267
- Robert Wishart, 1267 x 1271-1273
- Adam de Gullane, 1282
- William Frere, 1285-1306
- William de Eaglesham, 1317-1323
- Alexander de Kininmund, 1327-1329
- William Comyn, 1329-1336 x 1337
- John de Douglas, 1336 x 1337
- Walter de Moffat, 1340 x 1341-1357 x 1359
- Walter de Wardlaw, 1357 x 1359-1367
- David de Mar, 1367-1382
- Duncan Petit, 1380
- Thomas de Barry, 1382
- Walter Forrester, 1386
- James Borthwick, 1390-1408
- John Stewart, x 1405
- William de Lawedre (Lauder), 1405 -1408
- Alexander de Lilliesleaf, x 1408
- Richard de Cornell, 1408 -1419
- John Derling (Devlyn), 1409
- Columba de Dunbar, 1419-1422
- William Croyser, 1419
- Edward de Lauder, 1419-1429/30
- David de Crannach, x 1429/30
- Thomas de Greenlaw, 1430-1431
- Gilbert Forrester, 1431
- Alexander de Newton, 1431-1433
- William Croyser 1433 - bef. Aug 1440 (deprived)
- John de Lawedre (Lauder)(d.1474), bef. July 1443 – 1452/3
- William Croyser (d.1468), 1452 x 1453 - 1460 x 1461(7)
- James Lindsay (de Covington ?), 1461-1468/9
- Nicholas Graham, 1469-1469 x 1470
- William Ferguson, 1470
- Robert Blackadder, 1470-1472
- Archibald Whitelaw, 1470-1498
- Alexander Gisford, 1494-1507
- David Arnot, 1498-1503
- John Brady, 1505-1525
- Henry Forsyth, 1525 x 1530/1
- John Hay, 1531
- Patrick Stewart, 1532-1539 x 1542.
- Walter Betoun, 1546-1554
- Alexander Betoun, 1548-1584

== Bibliography ==
- Lawrie, Sir Archibald, Early Scottish Charters Prior to A.D. 1153, (Glasgow, 1905)
- Watt, D.E.R., Fasti Ecclesiae Scotinanae Medii Aevi ad annum 1638, 2nd Draft, (St Andrews, 1969), pp. 309–14

== See also ==
- Archdeacon of St Andrews
- Bishop of St Andrews
