= William Wishart =

- Bishop of St Andrews
- Church: Roman Catholic Church
- Diocese: St Andrews
- Appointed: 1271/3
- Term ended: 28 May 1279
- Predecessor: Gamelin
- Successor: William Fraser
- Previous posts: Bishop-elect of Glasgow (1270–1271)

Orders
- Consecration: 15 October 1273

Personal details
- Died: 28 May 1279 Morebattle, Scotland

William Wishart (or Wischard) (died 28 May 1279) was a 13th-century Bishop of St. Andrews. He was postulated to the see of St. Andrews (Cell Rígmonaid or Cill Rìmhinn) while holding the position as Bishop-elect of Glasgow, which he resigned when, on 2 June 1271, he was elected to that vacant see. He was succeeded at Glasgow by his cousin (consanguieus), Robert Wishart. His election to St. Andrews was notable, because apparently the bishopric's Céli Dé community were excluded from the election. Pope Gregory X charged the Bishop of Moray, the Bishop of Aberdeen, and the Bishop of Argyll, to look over the character of the elect and to investigate the legitimacy of the election, of the latter of which the Pope had suspicions. William, however, emerged successfully, and was consecrated at Scone on 15 October 1273.

William died on 28 May 1279, at Morebattle in Teviotdale. He was buried at St Andrews.

Religious titles
Preceded by Nicholas de Moffat	Bishop-elect of Glasgow; 1270–71	Succeeded by Robert Wishart as consecrated bishop
Preceded by Gamelin	Bishop of St Andrews; 1271/3–79	Succeeded by William Fraser
