= Archdeacon of Dunkeld =

The Archdeacon of Dunkeld was the only archdeacon in the Diocese of Dunkeld, acting as a deputy of the Bishop of Dunkeld. The following is a list of archdeacons:

== List of archdeacons of Dunkeld ==
- Jocelin, 1177-1194
- Henry, 1200 x 1209-1220 x 1225
- William de Ednam, 1221 x 1225-1245
- John de Everley, 1251 x 1257-1263 x 1272
- W [...], fl. 1282
- Matthew de Kinross, 1263 x-1304
- William de Pilmuir, 1329-1330 x
- Robert de Den, 1340-1347 x 1349
- Walter de Wardlaw, 1349
- Adam Pullur, 1351-1351 x 1352
- John de Ethie, 1352
- Ingram de Ketenis, 1351 x 1359-1398 x 1407
- Richard de Cornell, 1398 x 1407-1408
- Richard Hunter, x 1408
- Alexander de Lilliesleaf, 1408-1415
- Alexander de Lauder, 1415-1440
- John Stewart, 1418
- Ingram Lindsay, 1421
- James Bruce, 1440-1441
- Adam de Montgomery, 1440-1455
- John Carrick, 1455-1468
- James Lindsay, 1465
- Nicholas Graham, 1467
- William Livingstone, 1468
- David Luthirdale, 1475-1479
- William Elphinstone, x 1476
- Alexander Tours, 1492-1507
- George Ferne, 1508-1517 x 1518
- John Carnavel, 1512
- William Meldrum, 1517 x 1518-1527
- David Meldrum, 1532-1550
- David Spens, 1547-1586
- James Spens, 1581
- John Ramsay, 1591 x 1610-1618
- Alexander Bruce, 1619-1633

== Bibliography ==
- Lawrie, Sir Archibald, Early Scottish Charters Prior to A.D. 1153, (Glasgow, 1905)
- Watt, D.E.R., Fasti Ecclesiae Scotinanae Medii Aevi ad annum 1638, 2nd Draft, (St Andrews, 1969), pp. 119–22

== See also ==
- Bishop of Dunkeld
