= John Cameron (Scottish bishop) =

- Bishop of Glasgow
- Church: Roman Catholic Church
- Diocese: Glasgow
- In office: 1426-1446
- Predecessor: William de Lauder
- Successor: James Bruce

Orders
- Consecration: 1427

Personal details
- Died: 24 December 1446

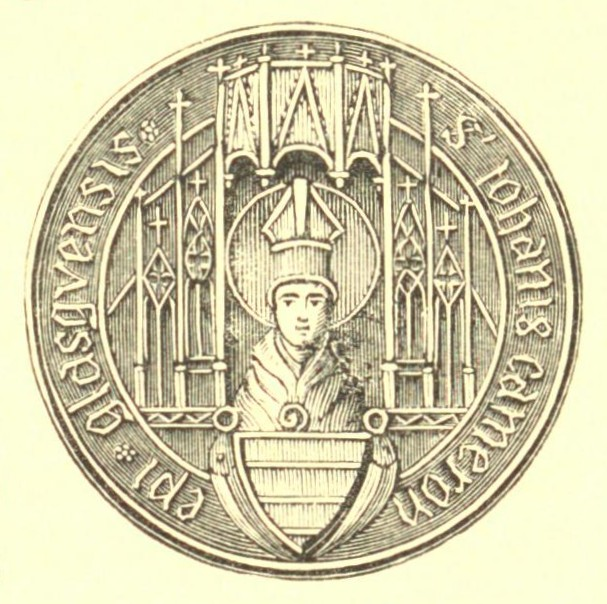
Seal of John Cameron, 1426-1446

John Cameron (died 1446) was a 15th-century Scottish cleric, bishop of Glasgow, and Keeper of the Privy Seal.

A licentiate in decrees (law), and provost of Lincluden, he became an official of the bishopric of St Andrews, and a canon of Glasgow, as well as secretary to Archibald Douglas, Earl of Wigtown, who secured for him the living of Rector of Cambuslang.

He transferred into the service of King James I as a secretary in July 1424, and became Keeper of the Privy Seal. When William de Lawedre, bishop of Glasgow, another close advisor of King James, died in 1425, the King chose John Cameron as his successor. John was thus elected to the see, but it was discovered soon after that the pope had already reserved the see for his own nomination. Nevertheless, Pope Martin V provided him to the see on 22 April 1426. He was consecrated sometime in 1427.

John was one of the most intimate advisors and associates of King James. On a number of occasions he faced accusations of improper conduct from the papacy, and was accused of being a bad influence on the king, although in reality John was James' man, not the other way around. John also served as an ambassador on embassies to England in 1429, 1430, and 1431. In November 1432, John passed through England again, this time on his way to Rome. He was in Bologna in July 1436, but back in Scotland by the beginning of August to join the king at the failed siege at Roxburgh, and likely presided over the king's last council in October 1436.

He died on 24 December 1446 at Lochwood, seven miles from the burgh of Glasgow.

Religious titles
Preceded by William de Lawedre	Bishop of Glasgow; 1425/6/7-1446	Succeeded by James Bruce
Political offices
Preceded by Walter Foote	Keeper of the Privy Seal of Scotland; 1426	Succeeded by William Foulis
Preceded by William de Lawedre	Chancellor of Scotland; 1427–1439	Succeeded by William Crichton
