= Walter Wardlaw =

- Bishop of Glasgow
- Church: Roman Catholic Church
- Diocese: Glasgow
- Appointed: 14 April 1367
- Term ended: 1387
- Predecessor: William Rae
- Successor: Matthew de Glendonwyn
- Previous posts: Archdeacon of Lothian (1357 x 1359–67); Archdeacon of Dunkeld (1349); Canon of Glasgow; Rector of Erol

Orders
- Created cardinal: 23 December 1383 by Antipope Clement VII
- Rank: Cardinal-priest

Personal details
- Died: c. 1387

Walter Wardlaw (died c. 1387) was a 14th-century bishop of Glasgow in Scotland and an anti-cardinal of the Avignon Papacy during the Western Schism.

== Biography ==
Wardlaw was the son of a Sir Henry Wardlaw of Torry, a middling knight of Fife. Before becoming bishop, Walter was a canon of Glasgow, a Master of Theology and archdeacon of Lothian. He was at the University of Paris, and a roll of the year 1349 has one "Master William de Wardlaw" in the English Nation. By this stage, he was already a canon of Glasgow, with a prebend in Glasgow and another in the diocese of St Andrews. Yet a petition of 1349 to the papacy has Walter requesting the church of "Dunenach" in the diocese of Aberdeen. By 1359, he is rector of Erol and archdeacon of Lothian.

After the death on 27 January 1367 of William Rae, Bishop of Glasgow, Pope Urban V, who had previously reserved the see for his own appointment, advanced Walter as bishop. The canons of Glasgow had already elected him, but the pope declared the election void before himself providing the same man to the bishopric. On 23 December 1383, during the Western Schism in which the Kingdom of Scotland sided with the Avignon Papacy, Avignon Pope Clement VII made Walter a cardinal priest (without title, that is, title to any church in Rome to which he would have been theoretically attached). In the following year, on 24 November 1384, the same pope granted Wardlaw with the powers of a legate in Scotland and Ireland. At this point in time, cardinals had to "vacate" their bishoprics upon becoming a cardinal, and so Wardlaw ceased using the title "Bishop of Glasgow". However, after a papal grant he retained administration of the diocese and continued to use his Glaswegian episcopal seal. Walter was frequently used as a diplomat for the Scottish crown in its relations with the Kingdom of England. For instance, in June, 1369, Walter was ambassador in England, and in 1384, he was one of the plenipotentiaries involved in negotiating the truce of 1384. Henry Wardlaw, future Bishop of St Andrews, was Walter's nephew. Henry was one of three nephews to whom Walter offered patronage and assistance gaining benefices.

Wardlaw probably died in September 1387.

Religious titles
| Preceded by William Rae | Bishop of Glasgow; 1367–87 | Succeeded by Matthew de Glendonwyn |
