= Diocese of Brechin =

Pre-Reformation diocese of Scotland

Coordinates: 56.733°N 2.659°W

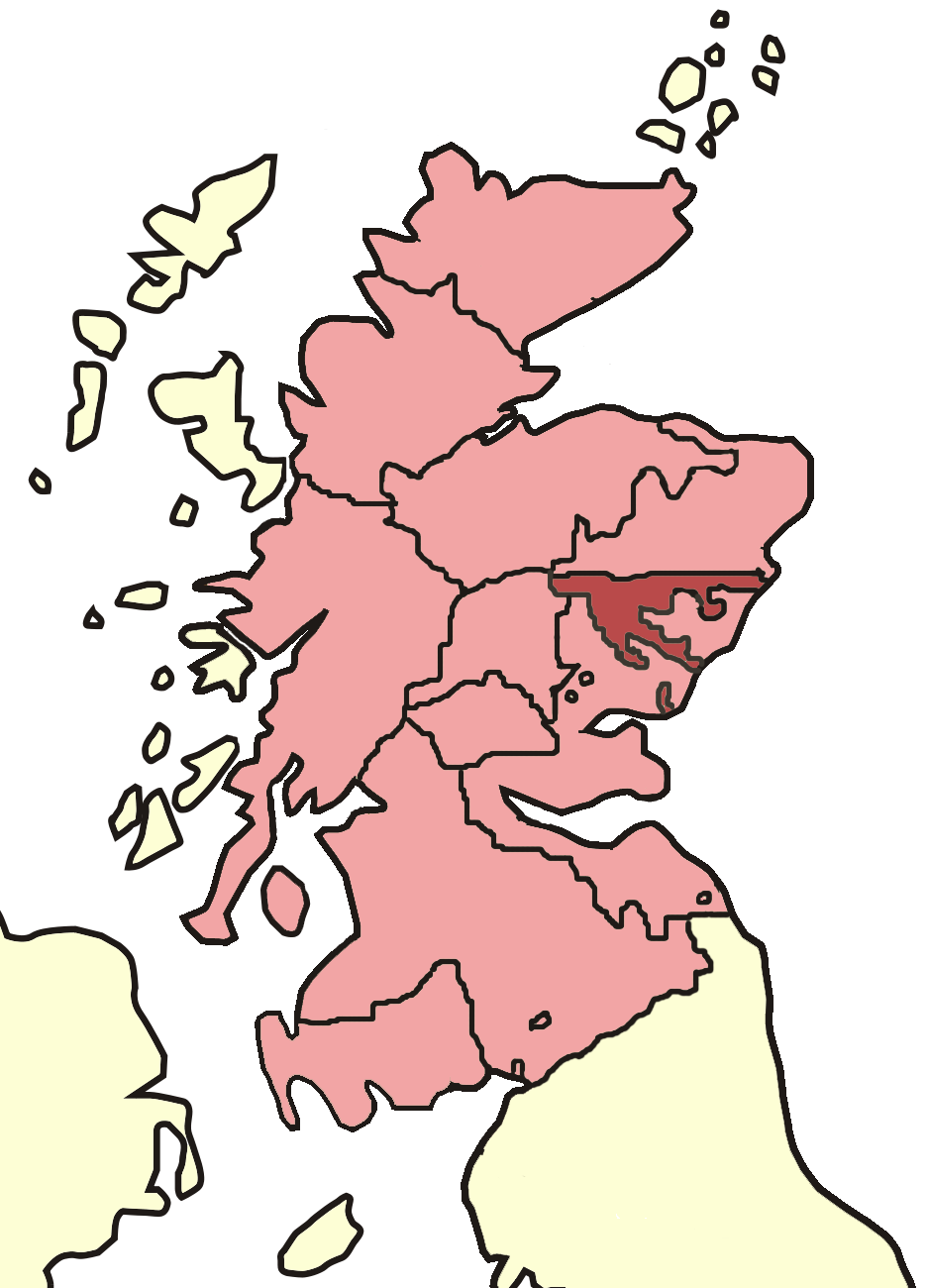
Skene's map of Scottish bishoprics in the reign of David I (reigned 1124–1153).

The Roman Catholic Diocese of Brechin, also known as the Diocese of Angus, was one of the thirteen pre-Reformation dioceses of Scotland. The Diocese also included parishes across the River North Esk in the Mearns.

== History ==
The diocese was believed to have been founded by Bishop Samson in 1153, and based at the cathedral in Brechin, Angus.

At the Reformation, the cathedral, churches and jurisdiction of the diocese were transferred to the Church of Scotland, its line of episcopacy having been continued without breaks by the Scottish Episcopal Church, which separated from the Church of Scotland in 1690.

The Diocese has been led by the Bishop of Brechin (Episcopal), sole successor to the early Catholic Bishop of Brechin.

== Parishes in Angus ==
1. Brechin (Cathedral)
2. Buthergill (now Burghill)
3. Cortachy
4. Crebyauch (now Kirkbuddo)
5. Dun
6. Dundee
7. Dunnichen
8. Farnell
9. Fothenevyn (now Finavon or Oathlaw)
10. Glenisla
11. Guthrie
12. Kilmoir
13. Kingoldrum
14. Lethnot
15. Maryton
16. Menmuir
17. Monikie
18. Montrose
19. Navar
20. Panbride
21. Stracathro
22. Strathmartine

== Parishes in the Mearns ==
1. Catterline
2. Garvock
3. Glenbervie
4. Kingornie
5. Strachan
