= Archbishop of Glasgow =

Archiepiscopal title named after the city of Glasgow in Scotland

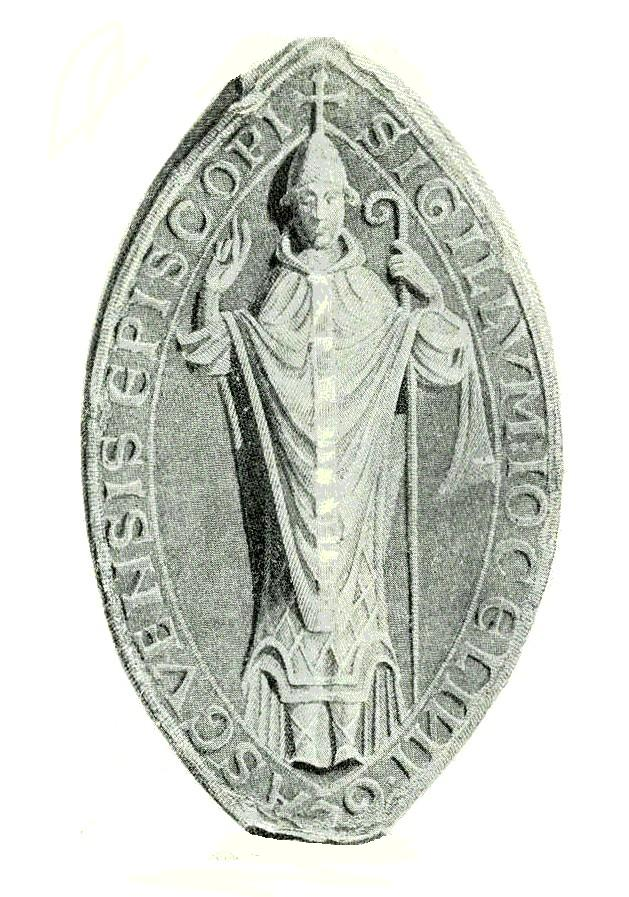
The seal or signet of Jocelin, a Cistercian monk and former Abbot of Melrose, who became one of the most significant bishops of Glasgow.

The Archbishop of Glasgow is an archiepiscopal title that takes its name after the city of Glasgow in Scotland. The position and title were abolished by the Church of Scotland in 1689; and, in the Catholic Church, the title was restored by Pope Leo XIII in 1878. In the Scottish Episcopal Church, it is now part of the Episcopal bishopric of Glasgow and Galloway.

The present Catholic archbishop is William Nolan, who was installed on 26 February 2022.

== History ==
The Diocese of Glasgow originates in the period of the reign of David I, Prince of the Cumbrians, but the earliest attested bishops come from the 11th century, appointees of the Archbishop of York. The episcopal seat was located at Glasgow Cathedral. In 1492, the diocese was elevated to an archdiocese by Pope Innocent VIII. After the Scottish church broke its links with Rome in 1560, the archbishopric continued under the independent Scottish church until 1689 when Episcopacy in the established Church of Scotland was finally abolished in favour of Presbyterianism, requiring bishopric continuity to occur in the disestablished Scottish Episcopal Church.

In the following centuries Catholicism slowly began a process of re-introduction, culminating in the Roman Catholic Relief Act 1829. A new papally-appointed archbishopric in the Catholic Church was introduced when the Vicariate Apostolic of the Western District was elevated to archdiocese status on 4 March 1878 on the restoration of the Scottish hierarchy, and then to metropolitan archdiocese status on 25 May 1947.

== Pre-Reformation office holders ==
=== Bishops of Glasgow ===
Tenure (an "x" between two years indicates a range of possible starting or ending dates)	Incumbent	Notes
fl. 1055 x 1060	Magswen	Name is a corruption of either Magnus or Mac Suein. Said in York sources to have been consecrated by Cynesige, Archbishop of York.
fl. 1055 x 1060–1066 (?)	John Scotus	Said to have been consecrated by Cynesige; probably the John "the Scot" who later became bishop of Mecklenburg.
fl. 1109 x 1114	Michael of Glasgow	
1114 x 1118–1147	John Capellanus	
1147–1164	Herbert of Selkirk	
1164–1174	Enguerrand (Ingelram)	
1174–1199	Jocelin	
1199	(Hugh de Roxburgh)	Bishop-elect only, he died less than four months after his election.
1199–1202	William de Malveisin	Translated to the higher ranking Bishopric of St Andrews in 1202.
1202–1207	(Florence of Holland)	Was bishop-elect for five years, but apparently never received consecration.
1207–1232	Walter Capellanus	
1232 x 1233–1258	William de Bondington	
1259	(Nicholas de Moffat)	He travelled to the Holy See to receive consecration; but he did not pay the money requested of him, and his travel companions turned against him. He therefore returned to Scotland unconsecrated, and had to give up the see.
1259–1268	John de Cheam	
1268–1270	(Nicholas de Moffat) (again)	This time, Nicholas died before consecration.
1270–1271	(William Wishart)	He was translated to the higher ranking Bishopric of St Andrews before receiving consecration for Glasgow.
1271–1316	Robert Wishart	
el. 1316 x 1317	(Stephen de Dunnideer)	Travelled to the Holy See to receive consecration, but the Pope rejected his election under pressure from King Edward II of England; he died at Paris on his return home.
1317	(John de Lindsay)	Elected but rejected by the pope; later successfully appointed in 1323
1318–1323	John de Egglescliffe	He was provided and consecrated by Pope John XXII, acting in accordance with King Edward II, after rejecting the election of John de Lindesay. As a pro-English appointee, he never took possession of the see, and was translated to the Bishopric of Connor in March 1323.
1323–1334 x 1336	John de Lindsay	
1336–1337	John Wishart	
1338–1367	William Rae	
1367–1387	Walter Wardlaw	Created Cardinal by Pope Clement VII of the Avignon Obedience 23 December 1383
1387–1408	Matthew de Glendonwyn	In 1391, during the Western Schism, the Roman Pope tried appoint John Framisden to the see, but it was politically unsuccessful.
1408–1425 x 1426	William de Lauder	Also Chancellor of Scotland.
1426–1446	John Cameron	
1447	James Bruce	
1447–1454	William Turnbull	
1455–1473	Andrew de Durisdeer	
1474–1483	John Laing	
1483	(George Carmichael)	He was never consecrated because the Pope, Pope Sixtus IV rejected his election because he had previously reserved the see for himself.
1483-1492/1508	Robert Blackadder	During Robert's episcopate, the Bishopric of Glasgow was elevated to the status of Archbishopric. Thereafter, Robert and his successors would bear the title "Archbishop" instead of merely "Bishop".

=== Archbishops of Glasgow ===
Tenure	Incumbent	Notes
1483/92-1508	Robert Blackadder	During Robert's episcopate, the Bishopric of Glasgow was elevated to the status of Archbishopric. Thereafter, Robert and his successors would bear the title "Archbishop" instead of merely "Bishop".
1508–1523	James Beaton (I.)	
1523–1547	Gavin Dunbar	
1547–1548	(James Hamilton)	Crown nomination in 1547, but rejected by papacy in summer 1548 on grounds of illegitimacy.
1548	(Donald Campbell)	Crown nomination in 1548 to papal nuncio, but nuncio died and nomination dropped.
1550–1551	Alexander Gordon	
1551–1570	James Beaton (II.)	James Beaton was the last Archbishop before the Scottish Reformation. Although there continued to be archbishops of the see, they were no longer part of the Roman Catholic Church.

== Post-Reformation office holders ==
=== Church of Scotland succession ===
Tenure	Incumbent	Notes
1571–1572	(John Porterfield)	
1573–1581	James Boyd of Trochrig	
1581–1585	Robert Montgomerie	
1585–1587	William Erskine	
1585–1587	Walter Stewart	
1598–1603	James Beaton	Reinstated to title, style, dignity and benefices of the Archbishopric by King James VI, but "being not of our religion" not to the actual exercise of the office.
1603–1615	John Spottiswoode	
1615–1632	James Law	
1632–1638	Patrick Lindsay	Died 1644
1638–1661	See temporally abolished.	
1661–1664	Andrew Fairfoul	First bishop of the Restoration Episcopate.
1664–1669	Alexander Burnet	
1671–1674	Robert Leighton	
1674–1679	Alexander Burnet (again)	
1679–1684	Arthur Rose	
1684–1687	Alexander Cairncross	
1687–1689	John Paterson	Deprived of the temporalities in 1689 when episcopacy was permanently abolished in the Church of Scotland following the Glorious Revolution.

=== Scottish Episcopal Church succession ===
Tenure	Incumbent	Notes
Archdiocese of Glasgow
1689–1708	John Paterson	After the Glorious Revolution, continued as a non-juror until his death.
1708–1724	See vacant	
Diocese of Glasgow
1724–1733	Alexander Duncan	
1733–1805	See administered by the Bishops of Edinburgh	
1805–1809	William Abernethy Drummond	Previously Bishop of Edinburgh 1788–1805.
1809–1837	See administered by the Bishops of Edinburgh	
Since 1837, the see is part of the united Diocese of Glasgow and Galloway.

=== Restored Roman Catholic bishopric ===
The archdiocese covers an area of 1,165 km^{2}. The Metropolitan See is in the City of Glasgow where the seat is located at the Cathedral Church of Saint Andrew.

(Any dates appearing in italics indicate de facto continuation of office. The start date of tenure below is the date of appointment or succession. Where known, the date of installation and ordination as bishop are listed in the notes together with the post held prior to appointment.)

Tenure	Incumbent	Notes
Vicariate Apostolic of the Western District
13 February 1827 to 20 September 1832	Bishop Ranald MacDonald, Vicar Apostolic of the Western District	Vicar Apostolic of the Highland District; died in office
20 September 1832 to 15 October 1845	Bishop Andrew Scott, Vicar Apostolic of the Western District	Coadjutor Vicar Apostolic of the Western District; resigned
15 October 1845 to 15 December 1865	Bishop John Murdoch, Vicar Apostolic of the Western District	Coadjutor Vicar Apostolic of the Western District; died in office
15 December 1865 to 4 March 1869	Bishop John Gray, Vicar Apostolic of the Western District	Coadjutor Vicar Apostolic of the Western District; resigned
4 March 1869 to 16 April 1869	Sede vacante	
16 April 1869 to 15 March 1878	Archbishop Charles Eyre, Apostolic Administrator of the Western District	Apostolic Delegate for Scotland and Titular Archbishop of Anazarbus; became Archbishop of Glasgow on the restoration of the Scottish Hierarchy in 1878
Archdiocese of Glasgow
15 March 1878 to 27 March 1902	Charles Eyre, Archbishop of Glasgow	Apostolic Administrator of the Western District, died in office
27 March 1902 to 4 August 1902	Sede vacante	
4 August 1902 to 14 October 1920	John Maguire, Archbishop of Glasgow	Auxiliary Bishop of Glasgow, died in office
14 October 1920 to 24 February 1922	Sede vacante	
24 February 1922 to 8 December 1943	Donald Mackintosh, Archbishop of Glasgow	Priest; ordained 21 May 1922; died in office
8 December 1943 to 6 January 1945	Sede vacante	
6 January 1945 to 25 May 1947	Donald Campbell, Archbishop of Glasgow	Bishop of Argyll and the Isles; became Metropolitan Archbishop
Metropolitan Archdiocese of Glasgow
25 May 1947 to 22 July 1963	Donald Campbell, Metropolitan Archbishop of Glasgow	Hitherto Archbishop; died in office
29 January 1964 to 23 April 1974	James Scanlan, Metropolitan Archbishop of Glasgow	Bishop of Motherwell; retired
23 April 1974 to 17 June 2001	Thomas Winning, Cardinal, Metropolitan Archbishop of Glasgow	Previously Auxiliary Bishop of Glasgow; created Cardinal 26 November 1994; Died in office
22 February 2002 to 24 July 2012	Mario Conti, Metropolitan Archbishop of Glasgow	Bishop of Aberdeen from 1977, retired, now deceased.
24 July 2012 to 13 January 2021	Philip Tartaglia, Metropolitan Archbishop of Glasgow	Bishop of Paisley; died in office
13 January 2021 to 4 February 2022	Sede vacante	
4 February 2022 to present	William Nolan, Metropolitan Archbishop of Glasgow	Bishop of Galloway

== See also ==
- Catholicism in Scotland
- Presbyterianism
- Church of Scotland
- Presbytery of Glasgow (Church of Scotland)
- Bishops in the Church of Scotland
- Bishop's Castle, Glasgow

== Bibliography ==
- Dowden, John, The Bishops of Scotland, ed. J. Maitland Thomson, (Glasgow, 1912)
- Keith, Robert, An Historical Catalogue of the Scottish Bishops: Down to the Year 1688, (London, 1824)
- Lawrie, Sir Archibald, Early Scottish Charters Prior to A.D. 1153, (Glasgow, 1905)
- Watt, D. E. R. & Murray, A. L., editors, Fasti Ecclesiae Scoticanae Medii Aevi Ad Annum 1638, revised edition, Scottish Record Society, Edinburgh, 2003, p. 187–196. ISBN 0-902054-19-8
