= Battle of Glasgow =

The Battle of Glasgow may refer to:

- Battle of Glasgow (1544), a clash on Glasgow Muir, Scotland, as part of the Rough Wooing
- Battle of Glasgow (1560), a battle between French troops and forces of the Scottish Reformation
- Battle of Glasgow, Missouri, a Missouri minor engagement of the American Civil War
