= Andrew Forbes =

Andrew Forbes may refer to:

- Andrew Forbes (organist)
- Andrew Forbes (runner)
- Drew Forbes, American football player
