= Bishop's Castle, Glasgow =

Castle in Glasgow City, Scotland

Coordinates: 55°51′46″N 4°14′11″W

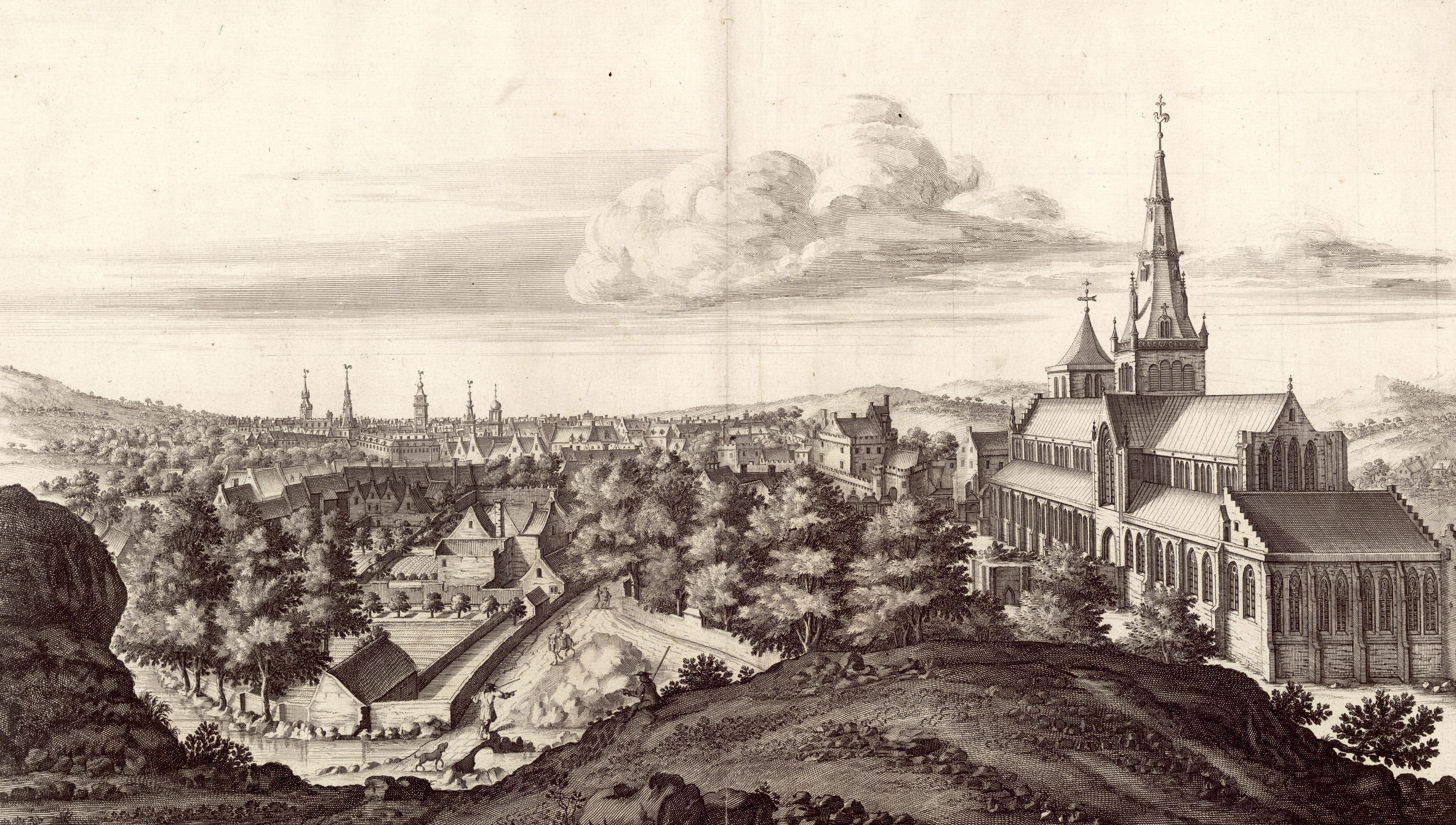
View of Glasgow from John Slezer's Theatrum Scotiae (1693), with the Bishop's Castle visible to the left of the Cathedral

The Bishop's Castle (also known as Glasgow Castle, the Bishop's Palace, and the Archbishop's Palace) was a medieval castle in the district of Townhead, Glasgow, Scotland. It stood to the west of Glasgow Cathedral, covering much of the present day Cathedral Square. The castle served as the residence of the Archbishops of Glasgow until 1689. Following the Glorious Revolution, the castle became the property of the Crown. It fell into disrepair during the 18th century, having been used as a quarry from 1755, and the site was cleared in 1789 to make way for the Glasgow Royal Infirmary.

== History ==
=== Origins ===
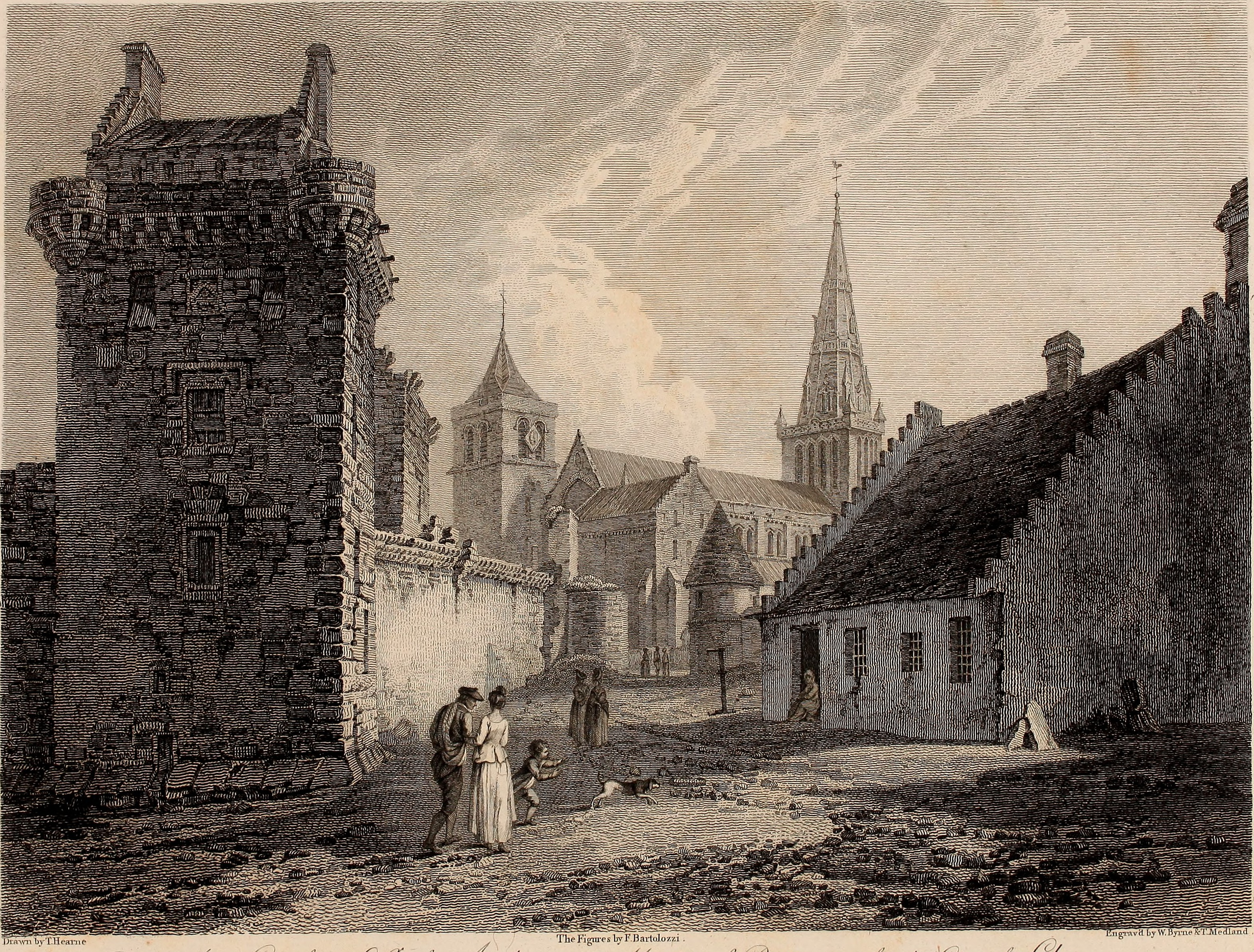
The castle as it appeared in 1778, shortly before its demolition

The origins of the castle are unclear, but the first development was probably in the 12th century and it was first recorded in charters in 1258. It had become an episcopal residence by the time of the Wars of Scottish Independence, when William Wallace recaptured the castle from the English in 1296. In 1301 the castle was garrisoned again by Edward I.

In the 15th century a 5-storey keep was built by Bishop Cameron, this was later extended with additional fortifications and buildings, constructed by later bishops. Archbishop Beaton added a large corner tower, and surrounded the whole complex with an ashlar wall with crenellated and reinforced bastions. Archbishop Dunbar built a round-towered gatehouse in the south-east corner between 1524 and 1547. The central keep served as the residence of the bishops and archbishops, and was called the Bishop's Palace or Archbishop's Palace. It was surrounded by a ditch and was accessed by a drawbridge. The castle played a role in the many political battles during the 16th century, including the protracted struggle between supporters of Mary, Queen of Scots, and her enemies. It changed hands six times between 1513 and 1570, and was occupied by French troops at one point. In 1544 it was defended against Regent Arran and Cardinal Beaton, and in 1560 defended for Arran.

=== Decline ===
The castle fell into disrepair during the 17th century, despite an attempt at repair by Archbishop Ross in the 1680s, and was gradually dismantled for its stone. It was finally demolished completely in 1789, to make way for the construction of the Glasgow Royal Infirmary. Foundations of the castle were discovered during excavations for the St Mungo Museum of Religious Life and Art in the 1980s. The museum building was designed by architect Ian Begg to reflect the style of the Bishop's Castle. A stone from the castle, with a modern plaque, is located in Cathedral Square, marking the location of the keep.
