= Glasgow Cathedral =

Church in Glasgow, Scotland

- High Kirk of Glasgow; St Kentigern's Cathedral; St Mungo's Cathedral
- Cathair-eaglais Ghlaschu
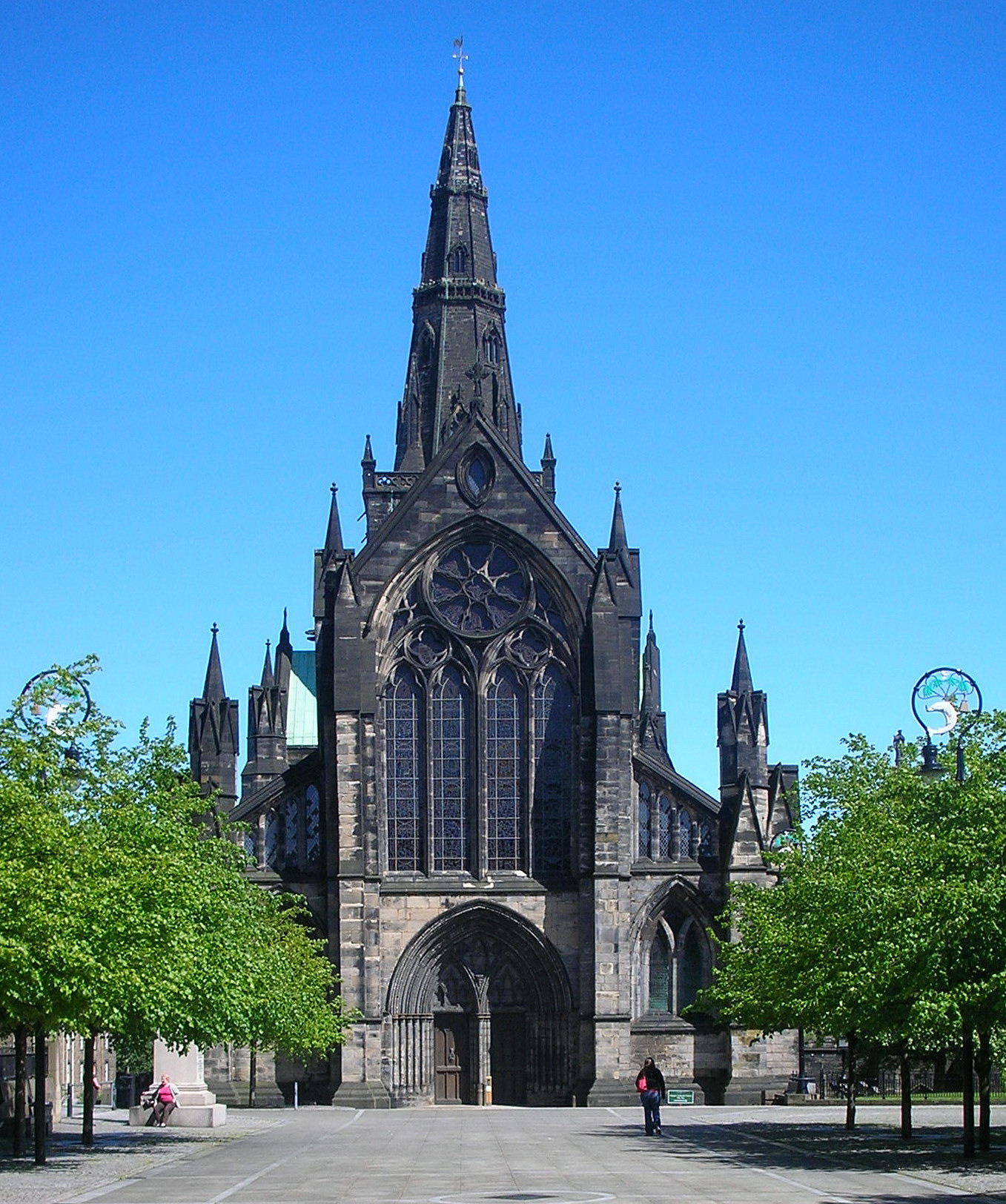
- The west front of Glasgow Cathedral, from Cathedral Square
- Glasgow Cathedral
- 55°51′47″N 4°14′05″W
- Location: Castle Street, Townhead, Glasgow G4 0QZ
- Country: Scotland
- Denomination: Church of Scotland
- Previous denomination: Roman Catholic
- Website: Official website

History
- Status: Parish church
- Founded: 12th century
- Dedication: Saint Mungo
- Consecrated: 1197

Architecture
- Functional status: Active
- Heritage designation: Category A listed building
- Designated: 15 December 1970
- Style: Gothic

Specifications
- Length: 285 ft (87 m)
- Width: 65 ft (20 m)
- Height: 105 ft (32 m)

Listed Building – Category A
- Official name: Glasgow Cathedral, 70 Cathedral Square, Glasgow
- Designated: 15 December 1970
- Reference no.: LB32654

Glasgow Cathedral (Scottish Gaelic: Cathair-eaglais Ghlaschu) is a parish church of the Church of Scotland in Glasgow, Scotland. It was the cathedral church of the Archbishop of Glasgow, and the mother church of the Archdiocese of Glasgow and the province of Glasgow, from the 12th century until the Scottish Reformation in the 16th century. (Note: As the Church of Scotland is not governed by bishops, it has no cathedrals in the episcopal sense of the word.) It is the oldest cathedral in mainland Scotland and the oldest building in Glasgow. With St Magnus Cathedral in Orkney, they are the only medieval cathedrals in Scotland to have survived the Reformation virtually intact. The medieval Bishop's Castle stood to the west of the cathedral until 1789. Although notionally it lies within the Townhead area of the city, the Cathedral grounds and the neighbouring Necropolis are considered to be their own district within the city.

The cathedral is dedicated to Saint Mungo (also known as Kentigern), the patron saint of Glasgow, whose tomb lies at the centre of the building's Lower Church. The first stone cathedral was dedicated in 1136, in the presence of David I. Fragments of this building have been found beneath the structure of the present cathedral, which was dedicated in 1197, although much of the present cathedral dates from a major rebuilding in the 13th century. Following its foundation in 1451, the University of Glasgow held its first classes within the cathedral's chapter house. After the Reformation, Glasgow Cathedral was internally partitioned to serve three separate Church of Scotland congregations (Inner High, Outer High and Barony). The early 19th century saw a growing appreciation of the cathedral's medieval architecture, and by 1835 both the Outer High and Barony congregations had moved elsewhere in the city, allowing the restoration of the cathedral to something approaching its former glory.

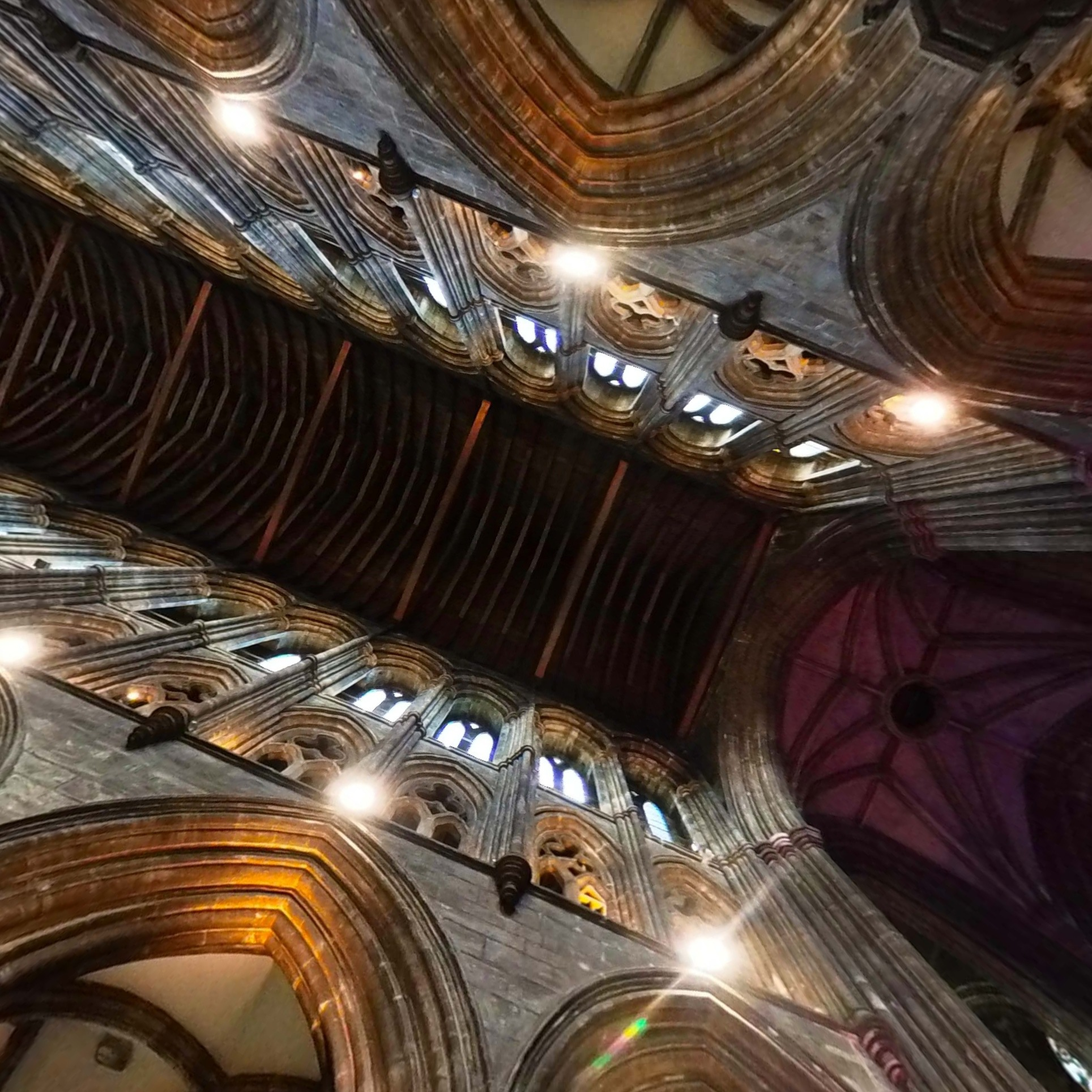
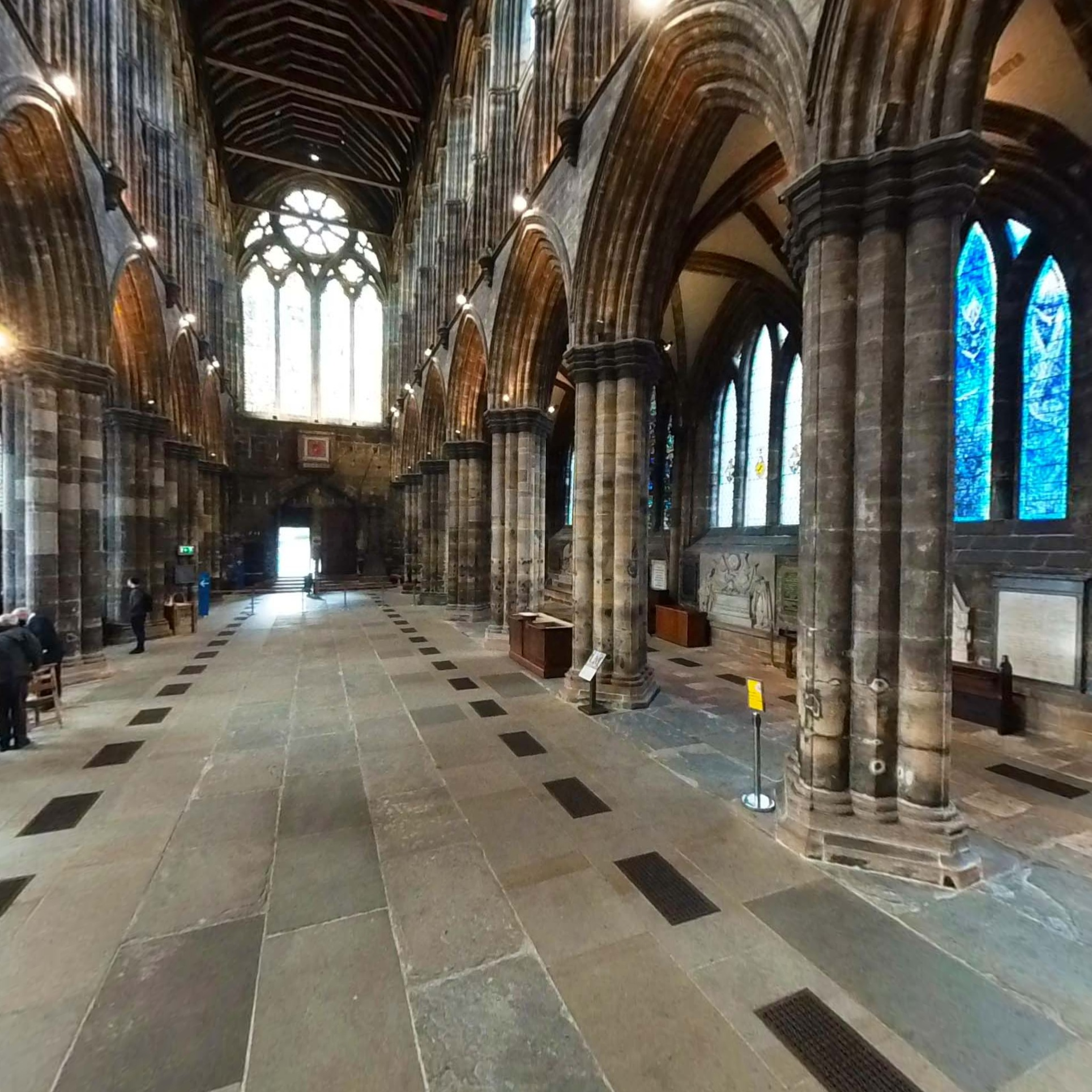
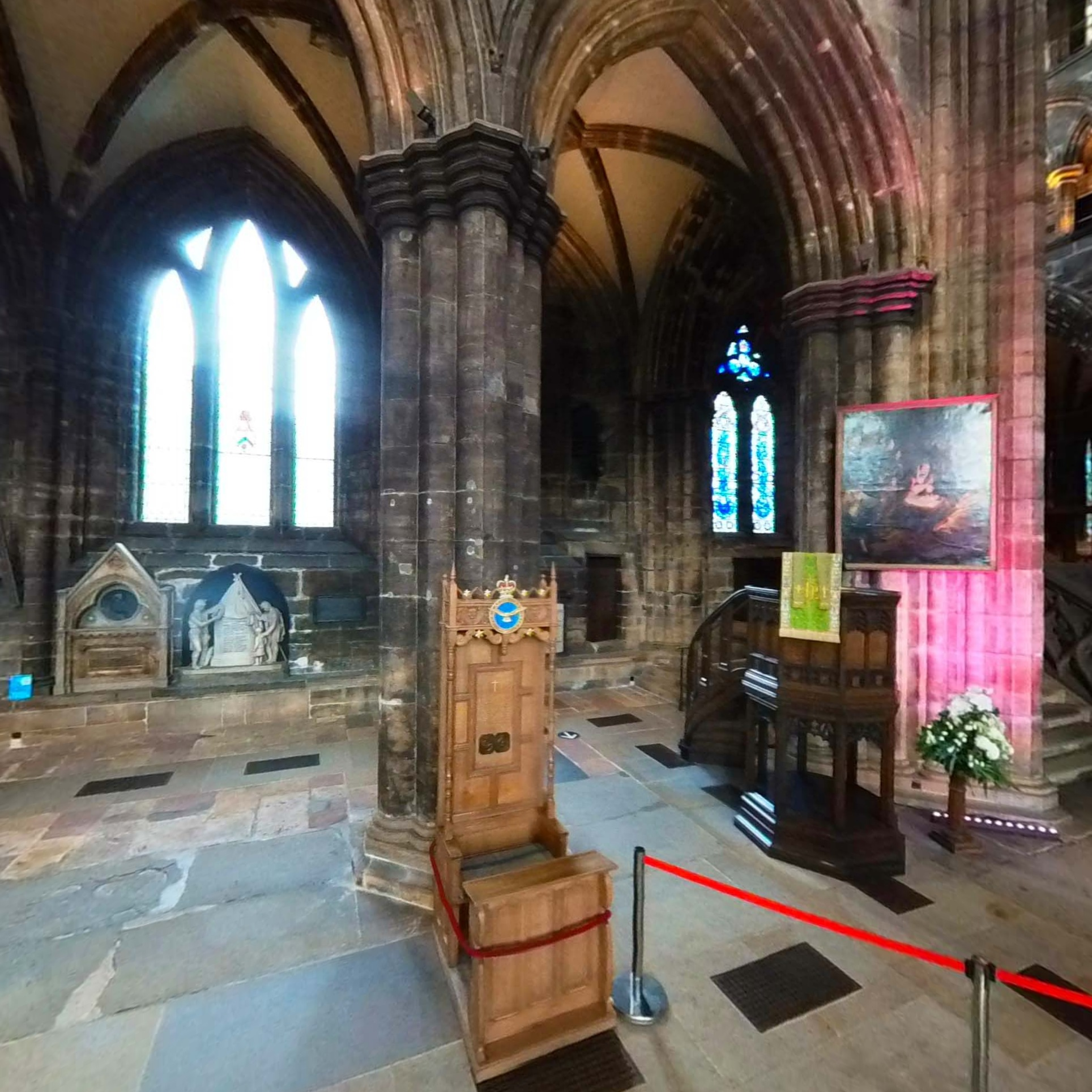
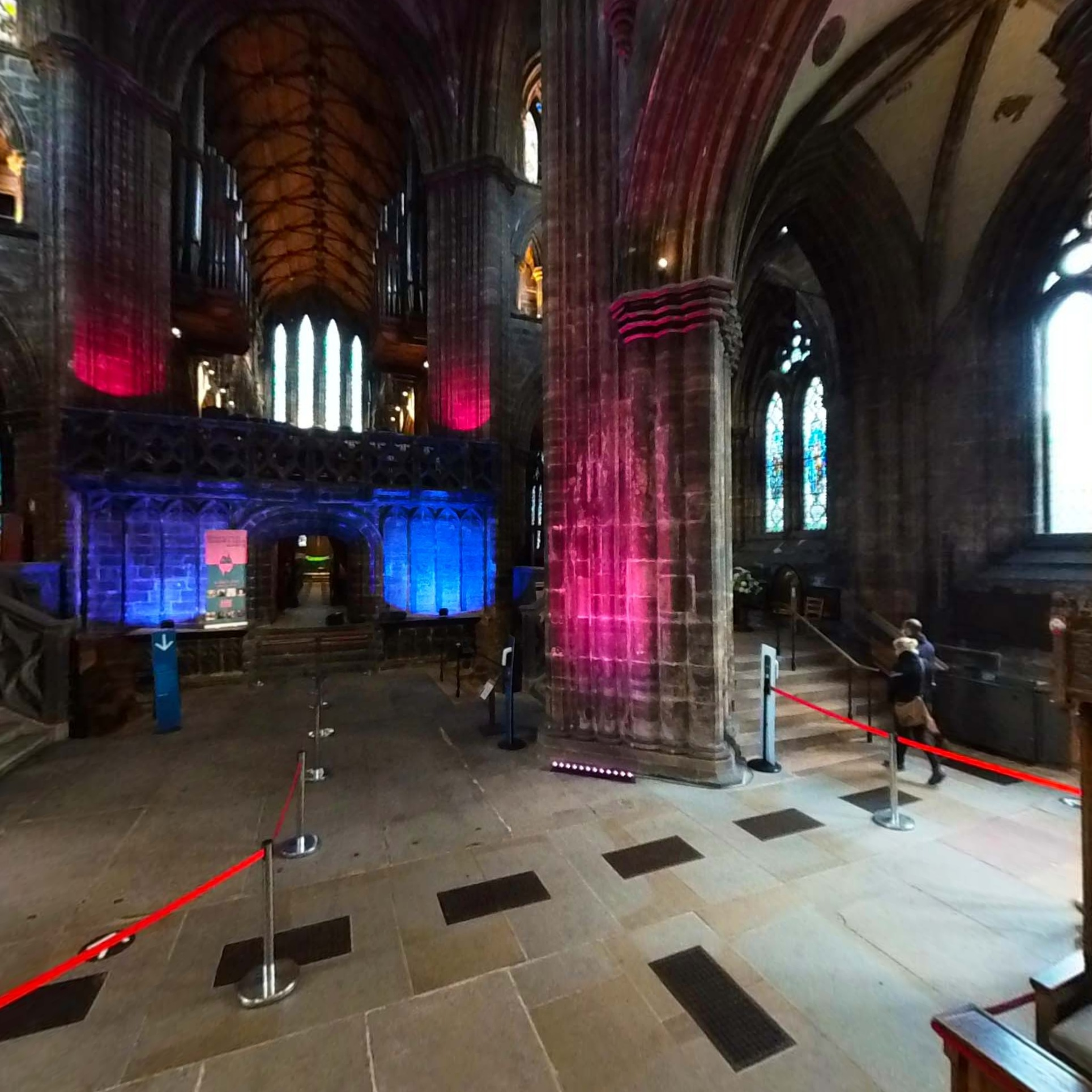
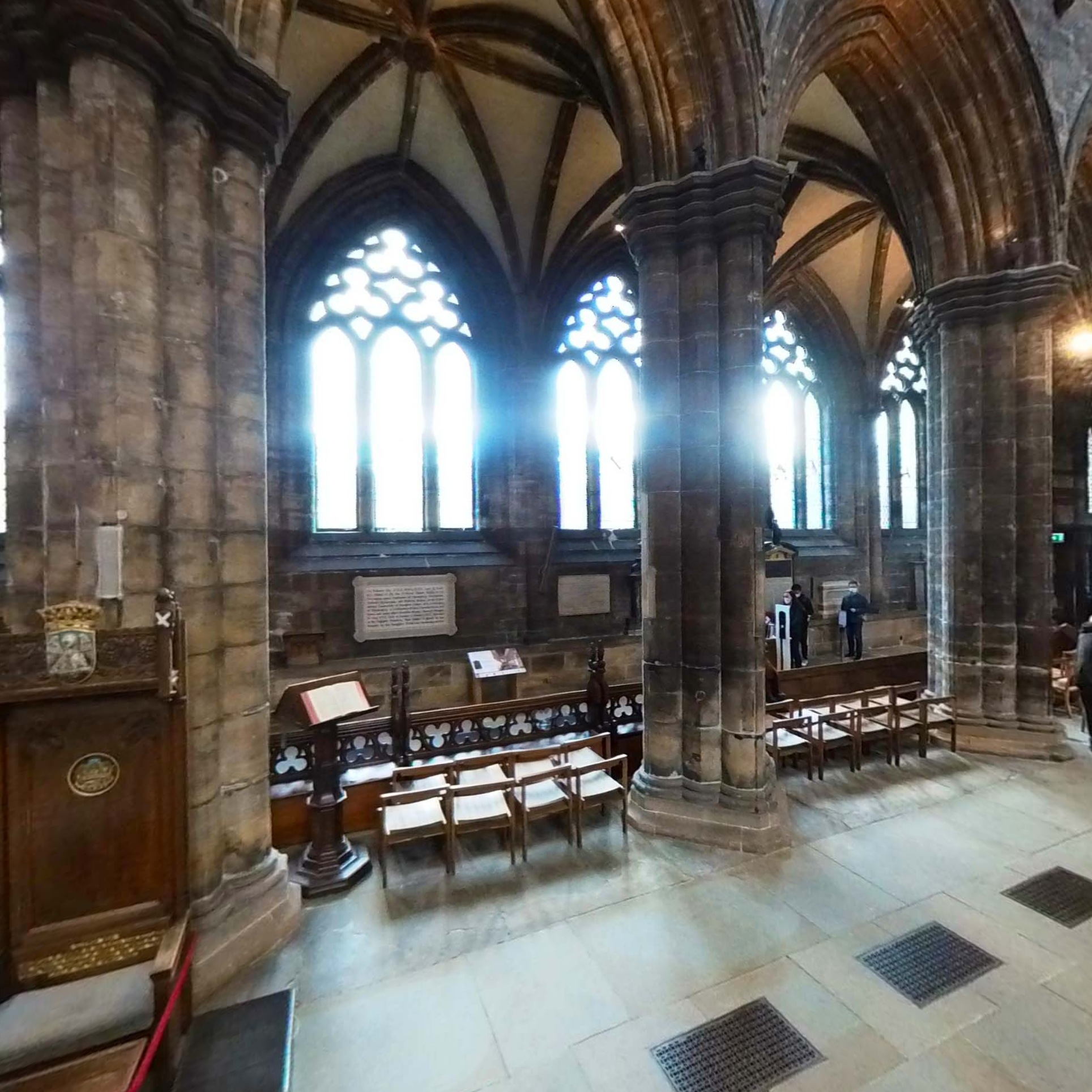
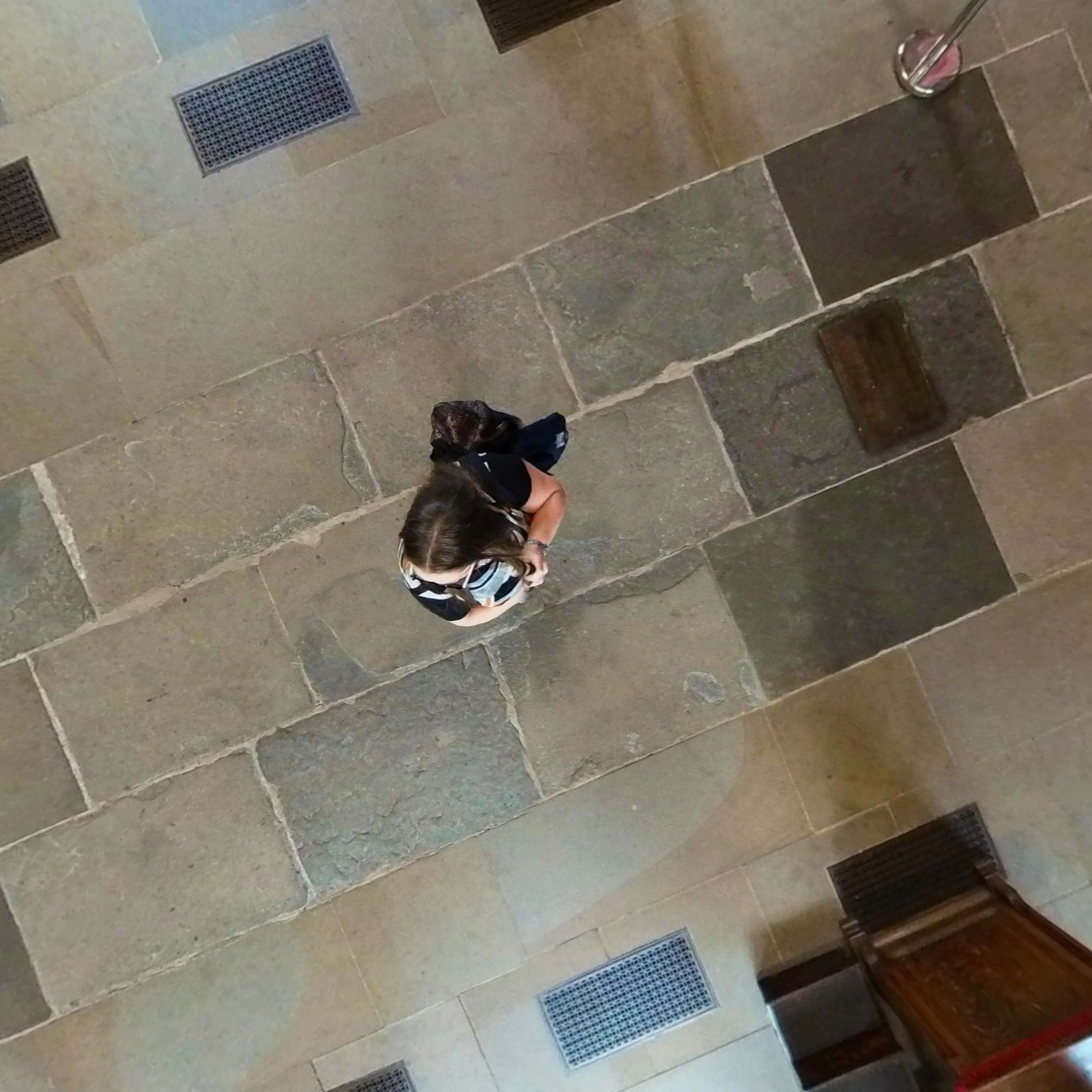
360° panorama inside the cathedral (2021)

Glasgow Cathedral has been Crown property since 1587. The entire cathedral building passed into the care of the state in 1857, and today it is the responsibility of Historic Environment Scotland. The congregation is part of the Church of Scotland's Presbytery of Glasgow.

== History ==
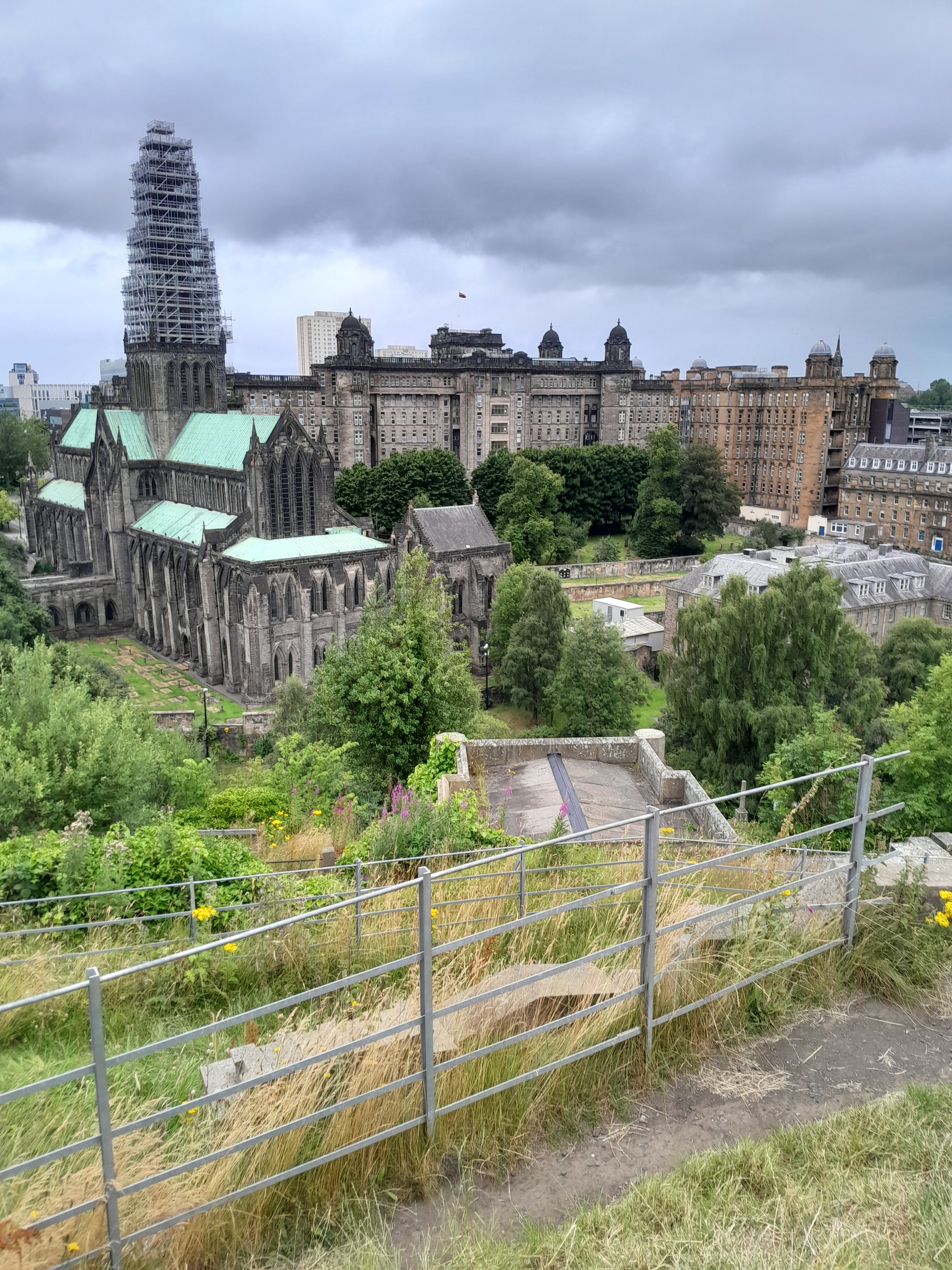
Glasgow Cathedral viewed from Necropolis

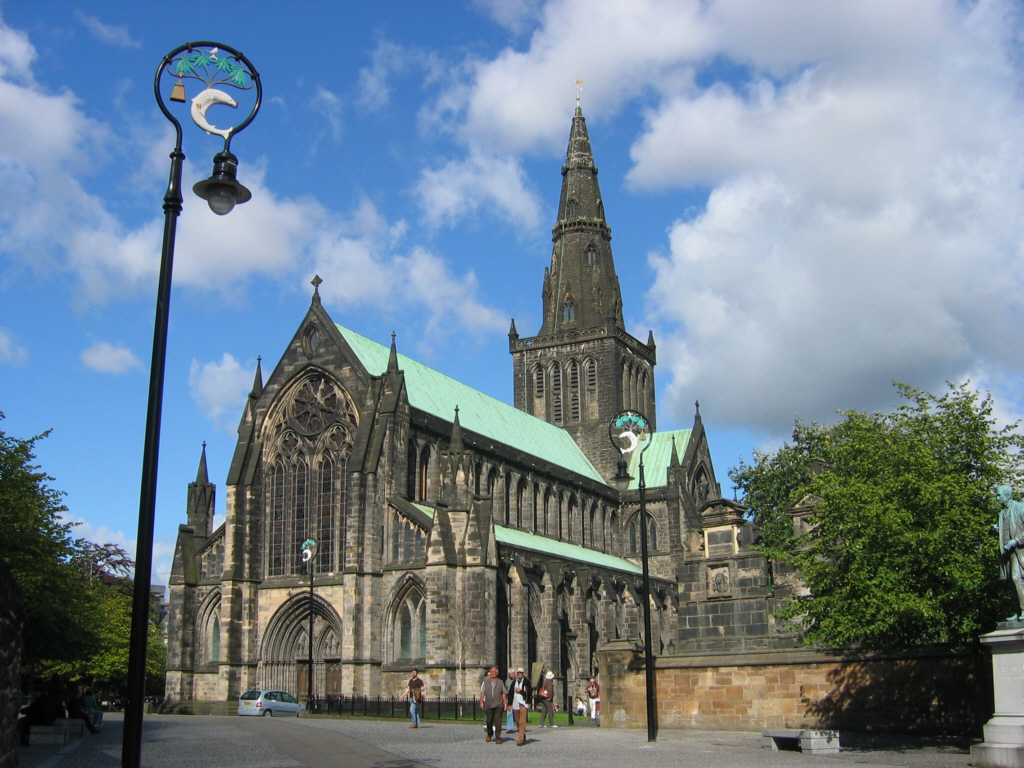
Glasgow Cathedral viewed from Cathedral Square

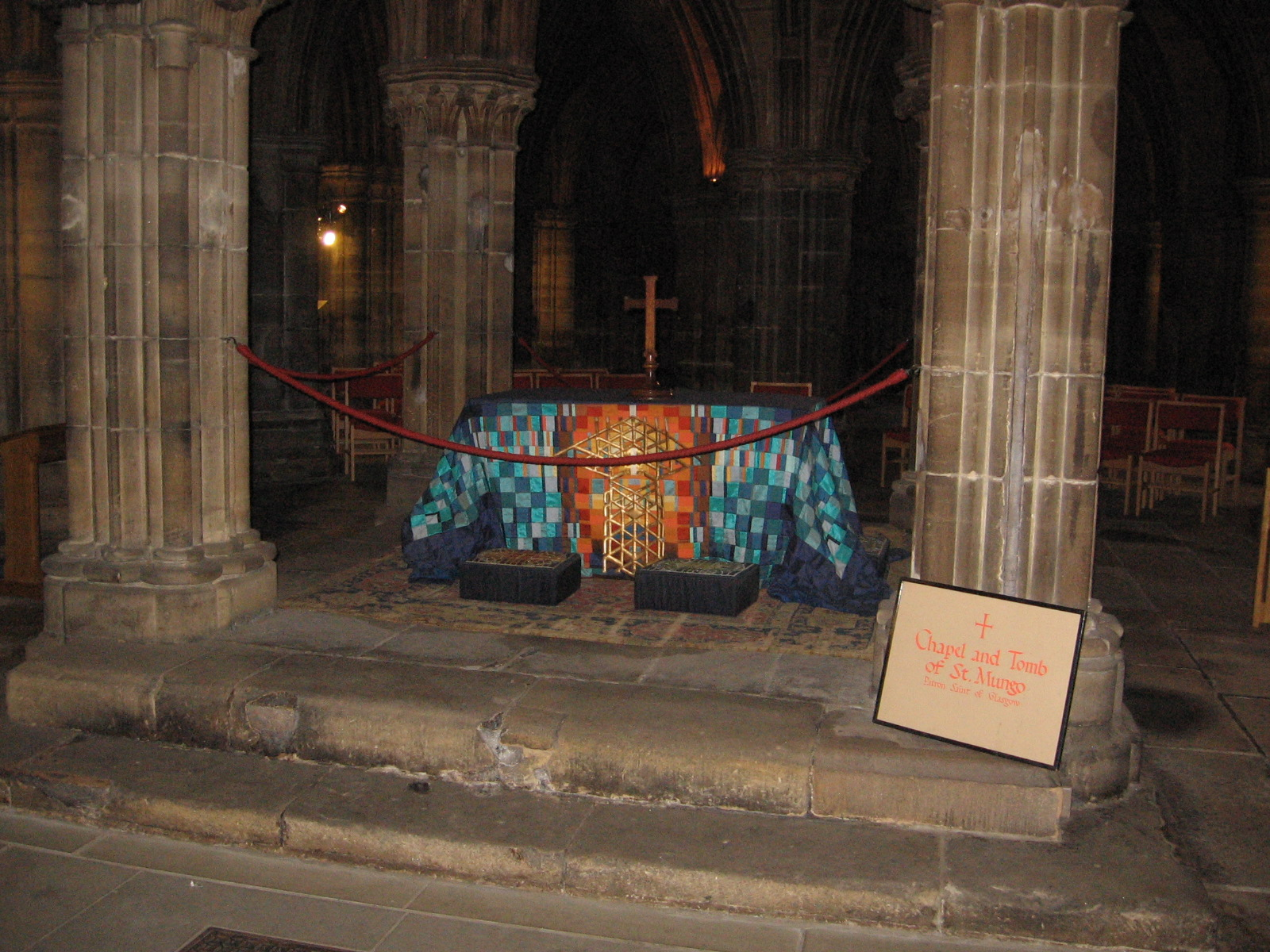
Chapel and tomb of Saint Mungo in the Lower Church

=== Early history ===
The history of Glasgow Cathedral is closely linked with that of the city. In the 6th century Saint Mungo is said to have brought the body of a holy man, Fergus, for burial at a site named Cathures (which came to be known as Glasgow). Saint Ninian is reputed to have dedicated the burial ground there on the western bank of the Molendinar Burn in the 5th century (the cathedral's Blackadder Aisle may mark this site).

Mungo built a monastic cell in the burial ground, and was buried in his church there in 614. His shrine in the Lower Church of Glasgow Cathedral was an important place of pilgrimage in the medieval period. Little is known about the early church buildings, except that they would have been of timber and wattle construction.

The first stone cathedral was built on high ground above the steep western bank of the Molendinar Burn. Initiated by the decision of David I to establish (or re-establish) a bishopric at Glasgow, the new cathedral was consecrated in 1136 in the presence of David and his court during the episcopate of John Capellanus. Constructed over St Mungo's burial place – a sacred location which may explain the otherwise unusual hillside site – the cathedral rose slowly, not without interruption and recasting, over a period of some 150 years. Excavations at Glasgow Cathedral between 1988 and 1997 uncovered architectural fragments of this first stone cathedral beneath the floor of the present cathedral. The west front of the 1136 cathedral lay at the third pier of the existing nave and its east end included the area of St Mungo's tomb. Following the defeat of Somerled in 1164 at the Battle of Renfrew, Somerled's head was brought to the cathedral. In 1175 Pope Alexander III recognised Glasgow as 'a special daughter' of Rome, freeing the diocese from the jurisdiction of the Archbishop of York. Around the same time Bishop Jocelin was granted a charter by William I to establish Glasgow as a burgh of barony, but with the privileges of a royal burgh. The king attributed the birth of his only son, Alexander, to the intercession of St Mungo.

=== Medieval period ===
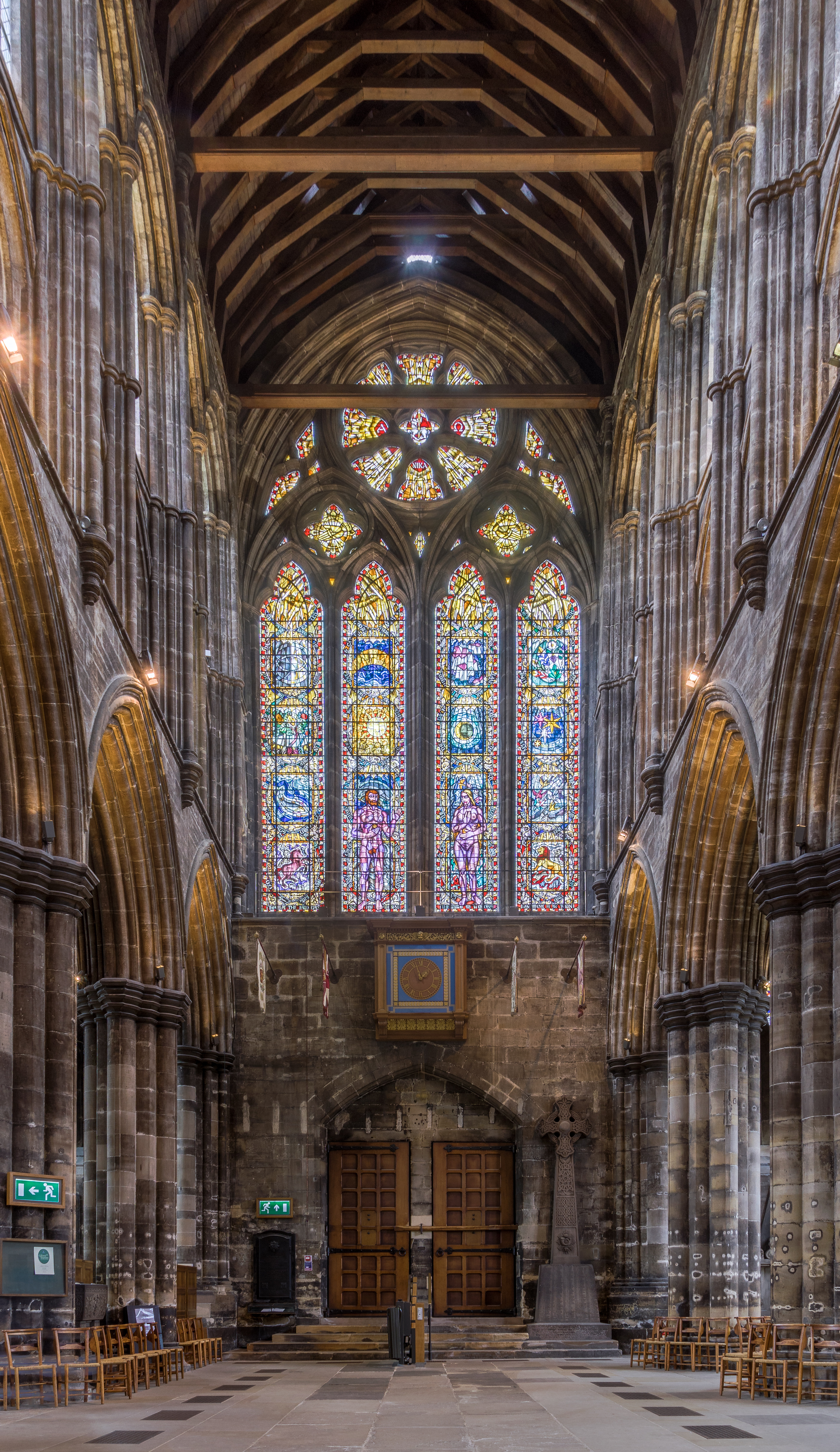
The Nave of Glasgow Cathedral and the Great West Window "The Creation" (1958) by Francis Spear

Destroyed or severely damaged by fire, the first cathedral was succeeded by the present cathedral, which was consecrated in 1197. Between 1207 and 1232, Bishop Walter Capellanus embarked upon a building programme which saw the completion of the choir and the Lower Church and provided the basis for the layout of the transepts and nave as eventually built. From 1233 to 1258, Walter's successor, Bishop William de Bondington continued the rebuilding, which included a new, longer, eastern arm to provide a shrine to Saint Mungo at the main level, and adding three projections (the chapter house, the sacristy/treasury, and what later became the Blacader Aisle). Construction work continued for much of the 13th century and included a bell-tower at the north-west corner of the nave, a south-west tower was added in the 14th century. The present central tower was built in the early 15th century under Bishop William Lauder, and its spire was added by Bishop John Cameron. Edward I of England visited the cathedral in August 1301 during the First War of Scottish Independence, making offerings over four days at the high altar and the tomb of Saint Mungo. Following the killing of John Comyn at Greyfriars, Dumfries in February 1306, Robert the Bruce hurried to Glasgow where he met with Robert Wishart, the "warrior" Bishop of Glasgow, in whose diocese the murder had been committed. Wishart granted Bruce absolution and urged the clergy throughout the land to rally to him, before accompanying Robert to Scone where he was crowned as Robert I. Wishart used timber which had given to him by the English to repair the bell tower of Glasgow Cathedral to make siege engines, and laid siege to the English-held Kirkintilloch Castle, before crossing into Fife where he took charge of the assault on Cupar Castle. After his death in 1316, Wishart's body was entombed between the chapels of Saints Peter and Paul and Saint Andrew at the east end of the cathedral's Lower Church. The tomb is uninscribed and the head of the effigy has been defaced at some point, probably during the Reformation.

In 1406 a lightning strike caused significant damage, including to the wooden steeple. Bishops William de Lauder (1408–25), John Cameron (1426–46) and William Turnbull (1447–54) rebuilt the central tower, spire and chapter house. Bishop Turnbull was primarily responsible for the foundation of the University of Glasgow. Turnbull prompted James II (who was a canon of the cathedral) to write to Pope Nicholas V to request the establishment of a university in Glasgow. The Pope responded with a papal bull issued on 7 January 1451, which erected a new Studium generale in Glasgow for the teaching of "theology, canon and civil law, as well as the arts and any other lawful faculty". The Bishops of Glasgow were to serve as the Chancellors of the new University of Glasgow, which held its first classes within the chapter house of Glasgow Cathedral, before moving to the Pedagogium or "Auld Pedagogy" on the Rottenrow.

By the 15th century the cathedral stood within an extensive walled precinct known as the chanonry, containing the Bishop's Castle, the manses of the cathedral prebendaries, (Note: According to Harvey (1843) these prebendal houses were completed in 1440 during the episcopate of John Cameron. The prebendaries were: Cadzow (Dean); Peebles (Archdeacon of Glasgow); Ancrum (Archdeacon of Teviotdale); Monkland (Sub-dean); Cambuslang (Chancellor); Carnwath (Treasurer); Kilbride (Cantor); Glasgow primo (Bishop's Vicar); Glasgow secundo (Succentor); Campsie (Sacristan); Provan; Carstairs; Erskine; Cardross; Renfrew; Eaglesham; Govan; Kirkmahoe; Manor; Calder; Lanark; Moffat; Tarbolton; Killearn; Douglas; Durisdeer; Edlestoun; Stobo; Ayr; Roxburgh; Ashkirk; Luss; Hawick; Bothwell; Sanquhar; Cumnock; Strathblane; and Polmadie.) the houses of the vicars choral, St Nicholas' Hospital (founded in 1450), and the burial ground. Much was cleared away in the aftermath of the Scottish Reformation in 1560, and the only upstanding structure surviving today is the late 15th-century Provand's Lordship, on the west side of Castle Street. In 1492 Pope Innocent VIII raised the see of Glasgow to the rank of archbishopric. James IV (who was a canon of the cathedral) ratified the treaty of Perpetual Peace with England at the high altar on 10 December 1502. The cathedral and the nearby castle played a part in the battles of Glasgow in 1544 and 1560.

=== Reformation ===
The Scottish Reformation saw Archbishop James Beaton flee to France, taking the diocesan records with him, and Glasgow Cathedral was 'cleansed' of its Catholic furnishings such as altars and sculpture, and the roof was apparently stripped of lead. It was decided to retain the building for Protestant worship, and in 1562 David Wemyss, who had been minister of Ratho, became the first Protestant minister of Glasgow Cathedral. The fabric of the cathedral suffered from vandalism and plunder, and by 1574 it was in sufficiently bad condition to attract the attention of the Glasgow town council: "the greit dekaye and ruyne that the hie kirk of Glasgow is cum to, throuch taking awaye of the leid, sciait and wther grayth thairof in this trublus tyme bygane sua that sick arte greit monument will alluterlie fall doun and dekey without it be remidit". The condition was serious enough to encourage the town council to raise a tax of £200 for repairs to the cathedral in that same year, but the process of repairing the cathedral and modifying it for presbyterian worship dragged on for years. Many of the windows were bricked up, in 1578 the lead of the cathedral roof was repaired, and in 1579 the members of the Glasgow Trades House defended the cathedral from further depredation, enabling it to survive the Reformation relatively unscathed. On 22 April 1581 James VI granted the income from a number of lands to Glasgow town for the cathedral's upkeep. In July 1584 the Reverend Wemyss was pulled from the pulpit of the cathedral by members of the town council and other supporters of episcopalianism, to make way for Robert Montgomery, who had been appointed as "tulchan" Archbishop of Glasgow by the Duke of Lennox.

The cathedral eventually came to house three congregations. In 1587 the congregation of the Outer High Church, which served the eastern part of the city, began worshipping in the nave, eventually securing a distinct architectural space in 1647 when a stone wall was erected at the east end of the nave. In 1595 the Barony Church congregation was created. Its parish covered the area surrounding the city and it worshipped in the cathedral's Lower Church. In 1635 the choir was transformed through the erection of a partition on the pulpitum into the High Church or, as it came to be called, the Inner High Church.

Following the signing of the National Covenant, the General Assembly of the Church of Scotland met in the cathedral in November 1638. Dominated by the Covenanters, the Assembly nullified all acts and pronouncements of General Assemblies held between 1606 and 1618 because they had been dominated by the King and bishops, abolished episcopacy in the Church of Scotland and affirmed the Assembly's right to meet annually.

=== 18th–19th centuries ===
In 1798, the Barony Church ceased using the Lower Church for worship, and the entire crypt was transformed into a burial place. This involved introducing about one metre of earth over the floor and the erection of railings to mark out the lairs. During the 18th and 19th centuries, several memorial to Glasgow's Tobacco Lords, who made their fortune in slave-produced tobacco, were erected in the cathedral. The included Alexander Spiers of Elderslie, Sir James Stirling of Keir and Cecilia Douglas, all of whom owned slaves in the West Indies. Douglas also commissioned a glass-stained window in the cathedral to preserve her own and her family's legacy, which has since been removed. In the 1830s there was a growing appreciation of the architectural significance of the building which led to the execution of detailed architectural drawings and the publication of proposals for restoration work. By 1835, both the Outer High Kirk and the Barony Kirk had left the premises, leaving the Inner High Kirk congregation in sole possession of the cathedral. In 1843 the graves and earth were removed from the Lower Church and, as part of restorations to the crypt and the chapter house, the original levels of the floors were restored and the windows were opened up.

The 1840s also saw the demolition of the two towers which flanked the west front. The 144 feet (43 metres) tall north-west tower served as the cathedral's bell tower until the central tower was completed in the 15th century, while the 70 feet (21 metres) tall south-west tower, or consistory house, housed the diocesan records and ecclesiastical courts of the archbishops of Glasgow. In the 1840s, it was mistakenly thought that the two towers were not of great antiquity and they were thought to obscure the west door and window. The south-western tower was demolished in 1846 and the north-western tower was demolished in 1848. A lack of funds prevented their 'balanced' replacements from being built, and the present aisle façades were formed instead, under the direction of Edward Blore. In 1852 the galleries in the Inner High Kirk were removed, and in 1857 the entire cathedral building passed into the care of the state. The 1860s saw stained glass by the Royal Bavarian Stained Glass Establishment of Munich installed in the nave and choir windows. This scheme was one of the largest public art commissions of the Victorian age. In 1879 the organ, built by Henry Willis, was installed in the triforium of the choir, the first in the cathedral since the Reformation. In 1849 Queen Victoria and Prince Albert paid an official visit to the cathedral.

The Book of Glasgow Cathedral: A History and Description, edited by George Eyre-Todd, is a significant collection of writings from a number of different authors on the history and other aspects of the cathedral which was printed in 1898.

=== 20th century to the present ===
Between 1909 and 1912 the medieval timber roofs over the choir and nave (which were found to be unsafe) were replaced with new oak roofs, under the direction of William Thomas Oldrieve, Architect for Scotland within the Office of Works. The weight of the roof was reduced by the substitution of copper sheeting for lead and slate, and the distinctive green copper roofing on the exterior of the nave and choir dates from that time.

By 1938 the colours of the 'Munich Glass' had faded and the leading of the windows had deteriorated and needed to be replaced. The Society of Friends of Glasgow Cathedral decided that it should be replaced by works of the best contemporary artists.

Queen Elizabeth The Queen Mother unveiled a window in 1954 in memory of the dead of the four Scottish divisions in World War I and World War II.

In 1961 a chapel for nurses, also known as the Chapel of St Andrew, was dedicated in Glasgow Cathedral. The cathedral sits next to Glasgow Royal Infirmary. This was furnished by nurses and dedicated to Scottish nurses who died in the World War II.

In 1971 a memorial service was held in Glasgow Cathedral following the Ibrox Stadium disaster which claimed the lives of 66 football supporters.

The funeral of First Minister Donald Dewar was held in the cathedral in October 2000.

Elizabeth II attended services of thanksgiving at Glasgow Cathedral to mark her Silver Jubilee in 1977 and her Diamond Jubilee in 2012.

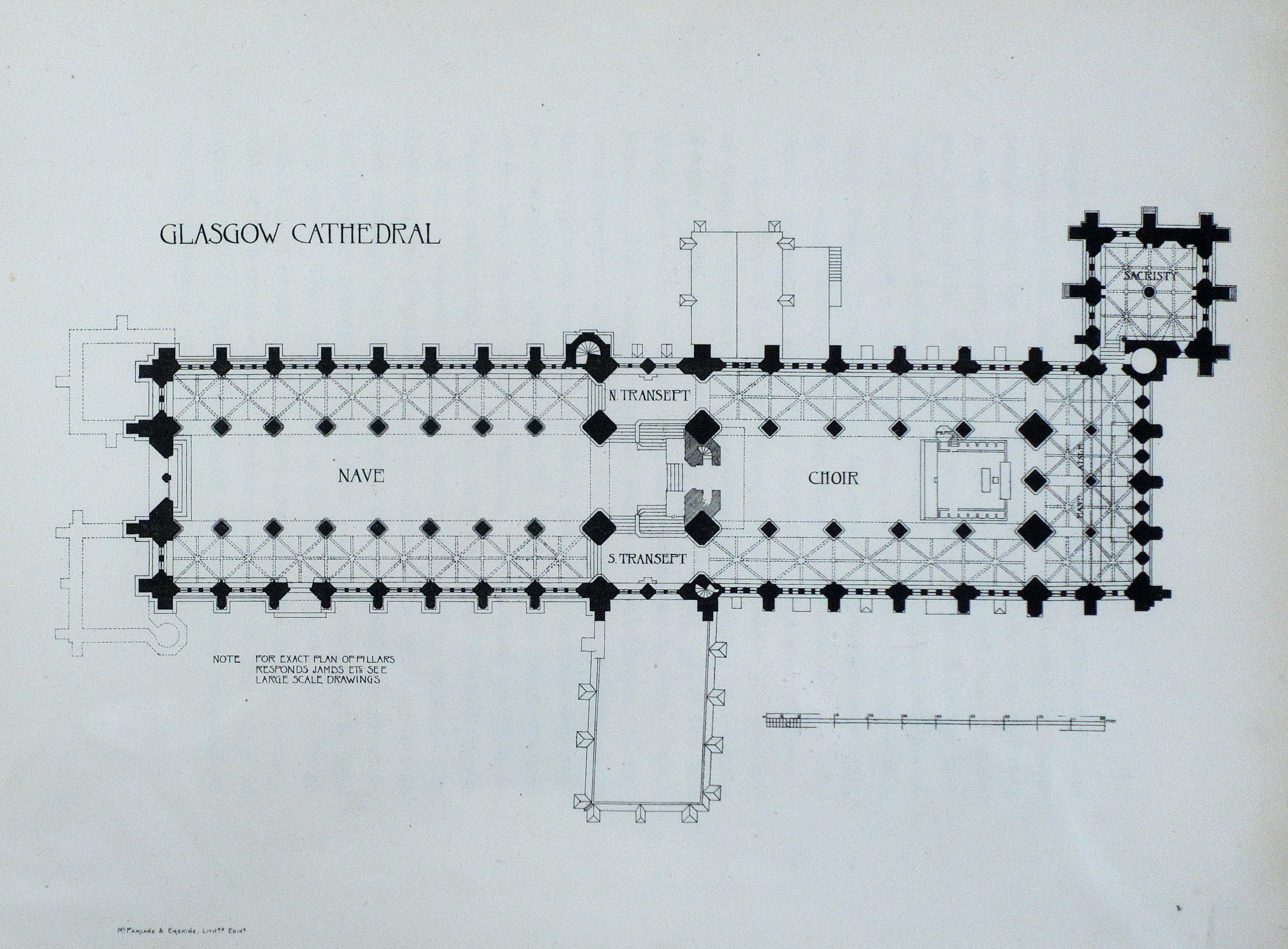
1898 plan of Glasgow Cathedral

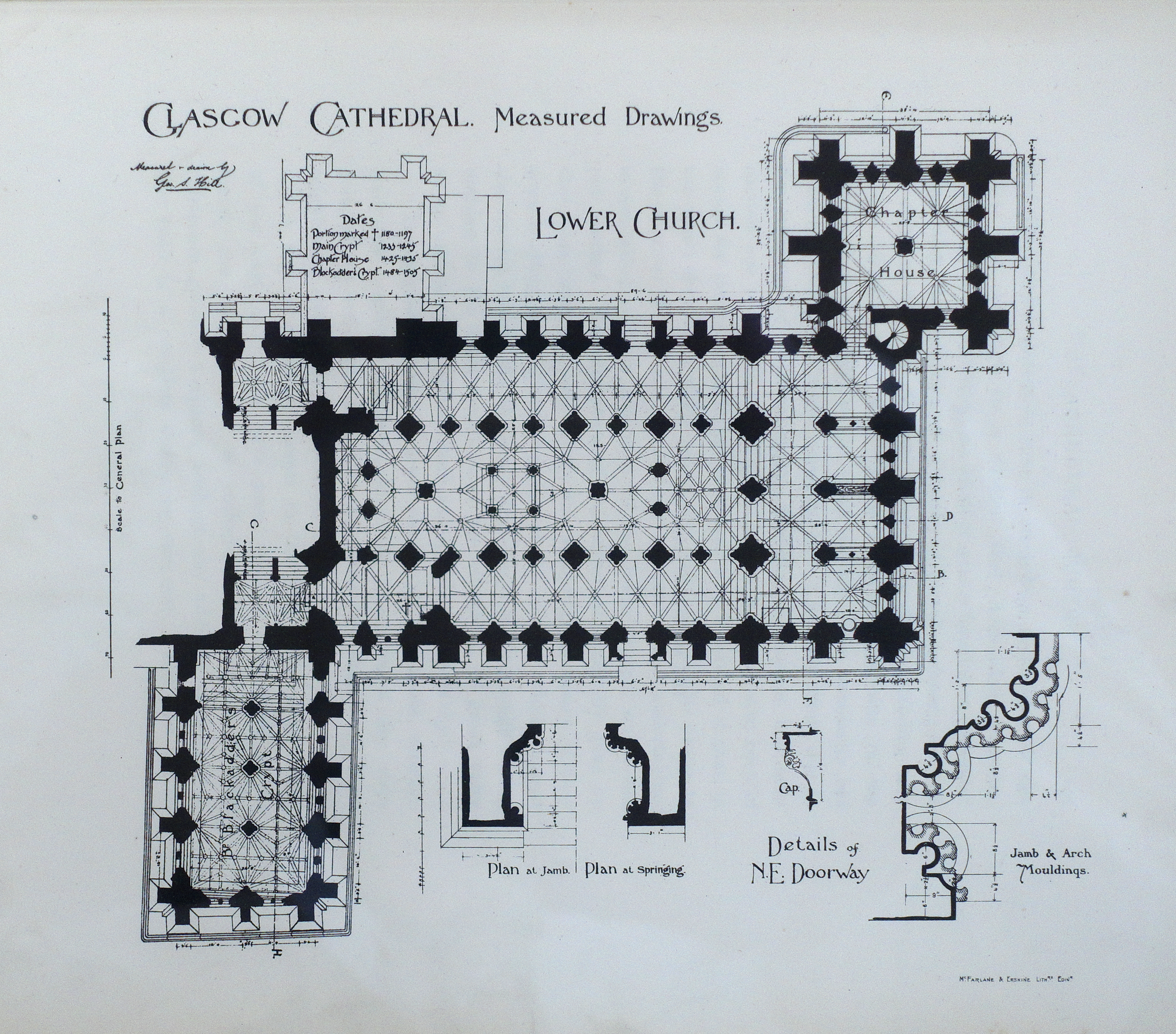
1898 plan of the Lower Church of Glasgow Cathedral

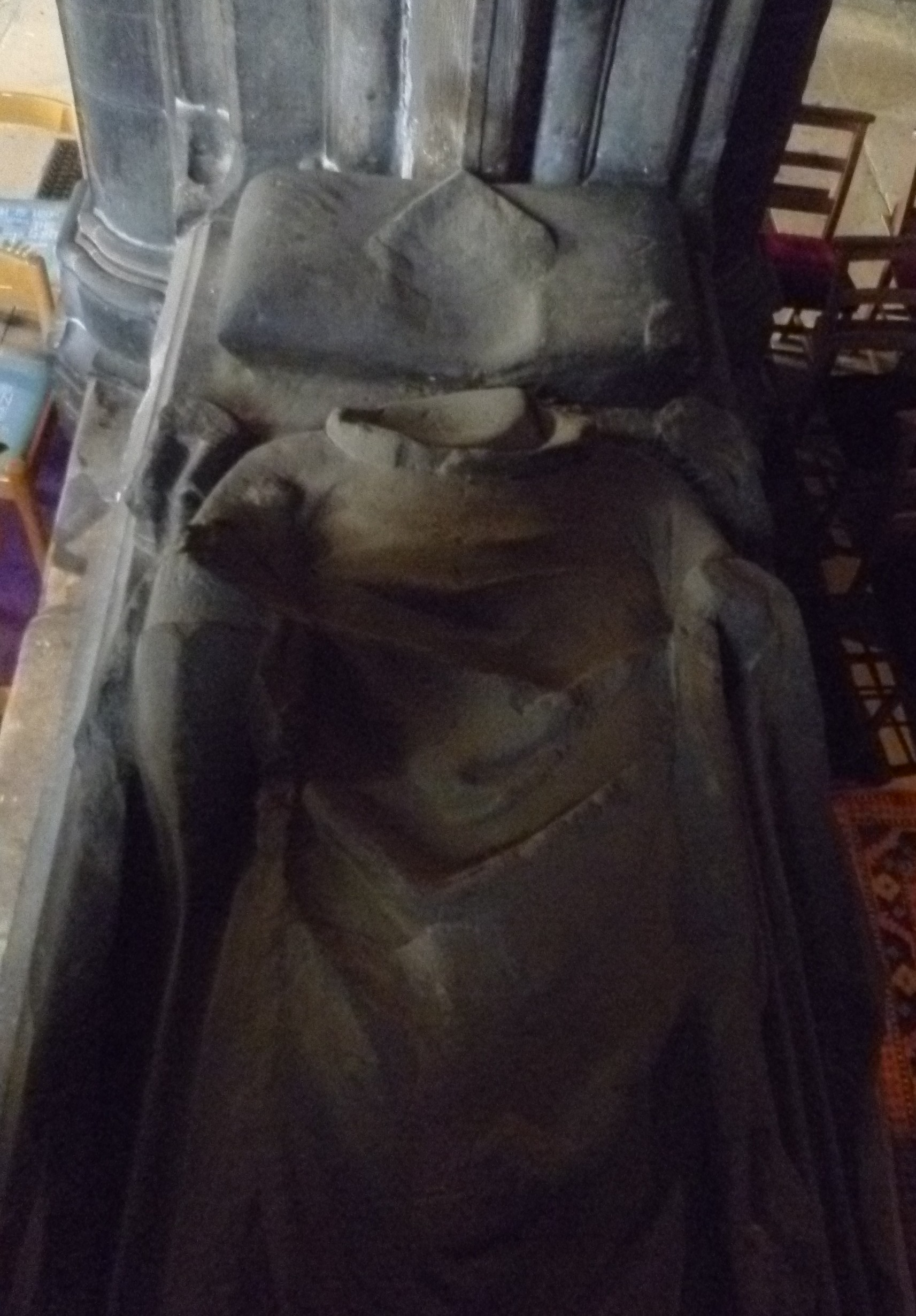
Defaced effigy on the tomb of Bishop Robert Wishart

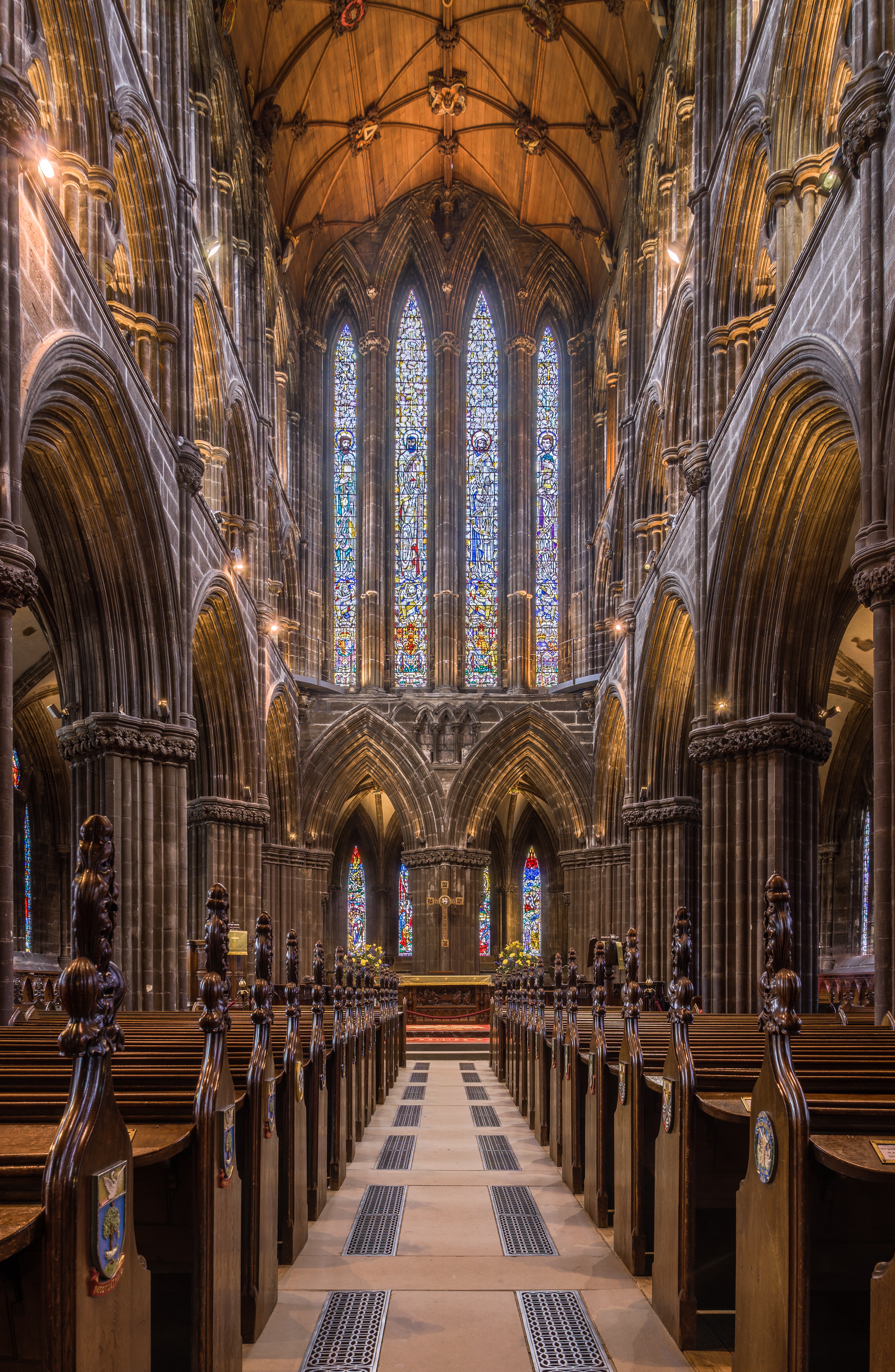
Choir

== Ministers of Glasgow Cathedral ==
- David Wemyss (1562–1615)
- Robert Scott (1616–1629)
- John Maxwell (1629–1639)
- Edward Wright (1641–1646)
- Robert Ramsay (1647–1651)
- James Durham (1651–1658)
- Ralph Rodger (1659–1662)
- Arthur Rose (1664–1675)
- Richard Waddell (1682–1684)
- Archibald Inglis (1685–1687)
- Ralph Rodger (1687–1689)
- James Brown (1690–1714)
- George Campbell (1715–1748)
- John Hamilton (1749–1780)
- William Taylor (1780–1823)
- Duncan Macfarlan (1824–1857)
- John Robertson (1858–1865)
- George Stewart Burns (1865–1896)
- Pearson McAdam Muir (1896–1915)
- James McGibbon (1916–1922)
- Lauchlan Maclean Watt (1923–1934)
- Nevile Davidson (1935–1967)
- William Morris (1967–2005)
- Laurence A. B. Whitley (2007–2017)
- Mark E. Johnstone (2019–present)

== Great Bell ==
The great bell of the cathedral now stands on the floor of the cathedral as an object of interest rather than hanging in the tower. Its inscription says it was originally made in Holland in 1583 at the expense of Marcus Knox, a Glasgow merchant. It was broken in 1778 and recast in London in 1790 by Thomas Mears.

== Music ==
Glasgow Cathedral Choir is a professional adult ensemble, singing at the two regular Sunday services each week. The current director of music is Andrew Forbes and the cathedral organist is Malcolm Sim. The four-manual Father Willis organ was installed in 1879, and has been maintained by Harrison & Harrison since they rebuilt the instrument in 1996.

=== Directors of Music ===
- 1879 Albert Lister Peace
- 1897 Herbert Walton
- 1929 R H Clifford Smith
- 1936 Wilfred J Emery
- 1965 John Turner
- 2010 Ian Simcock
- 2012 Richard Pratt
- 2014 Andrew Forbes

== Burials ==
=== Cathedral ===
- John Anderson, Lord Provost of Glasgow (1667)
- John Anderson of Dowhill, Lord Provost (4 times between 1689 and 1705)
- James Boyd, Archbishop of Glasgow (1573–1581)
- Gavin Dunbar, Archbishop (1524–1547)
- James Law, Archbishop (1615–1632)
- Saint Mungo, founder and patron saint of Glasgow
- Sir John Stewart of Minto, Lord Provost (1543–1544)
- Sir Matthew Stewart of Minto, Lord Provost (4 times between 1581 and 1599)
- Sir Robert Stewart of Minto, Lord Provost (1526–1536)
- Walter Stewart, Archbishop (1585–1587)
- Robert Wishart, Bishop of Glasgow (1271–1316)

=== Old Burial Ground ===
- Mary Hill of Gairbraid (1730–1809), landowner
- George Hutcheson (c.1558-1639), lawyer and merchant, founder of Hutchesons' Grammar School
- Thomas Hutcheson (1590–1641), lawyer, founder of Hutchesons' Grammar School
- Peter Lowe (c.1550-1610), surgeon
- Charles Macintosh (1766–1843), chemist and inventor
- Peter Murdoch of Rosehill (1670–1761), Lord Provost of Glasgow (1730–1732)
- Saint John Ogilvie (1580 - 1615), martyred Jesuit priest and saint of the Catholic Church

== Gallery ==
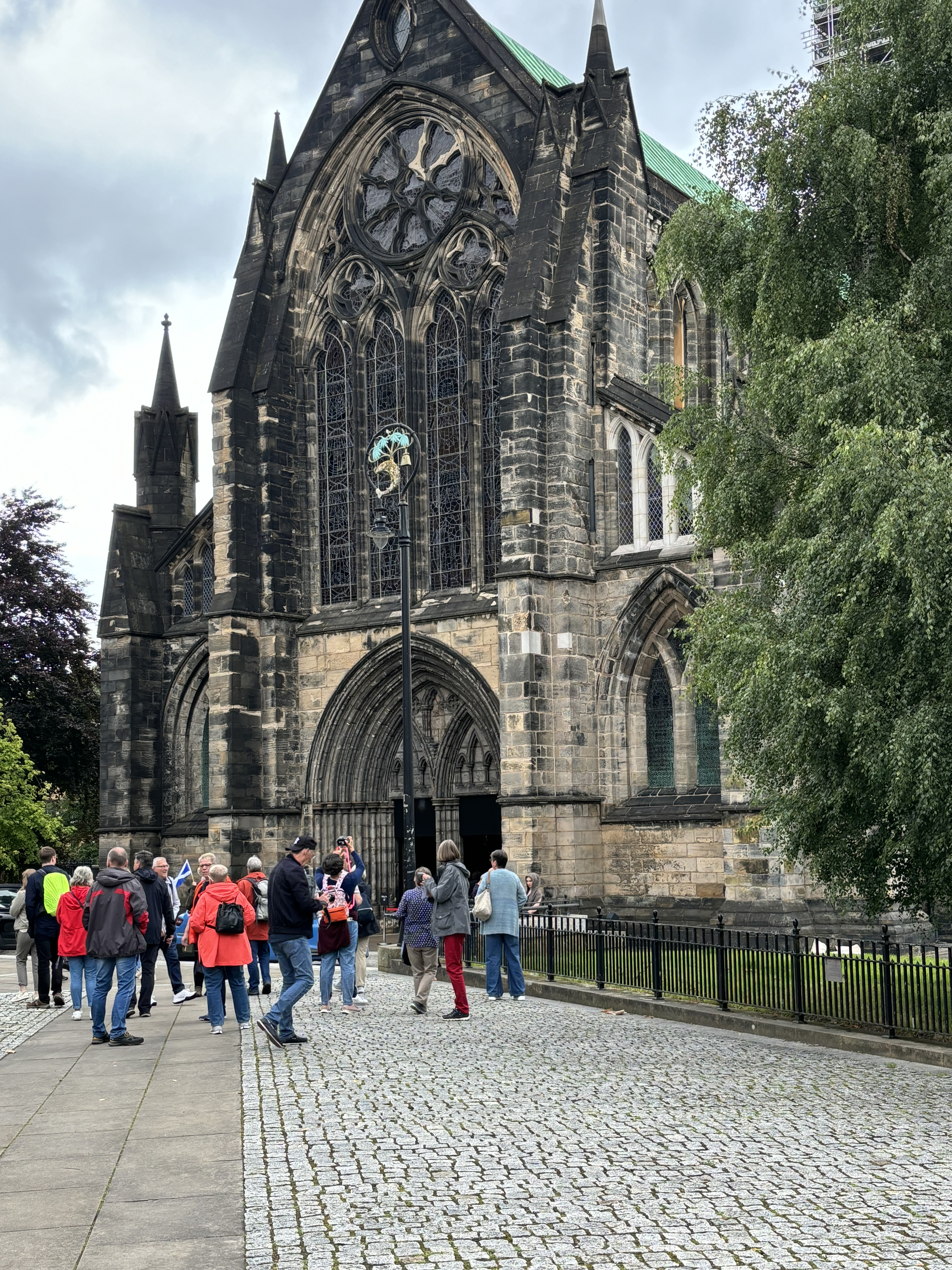
Photo took of church in Glasgow

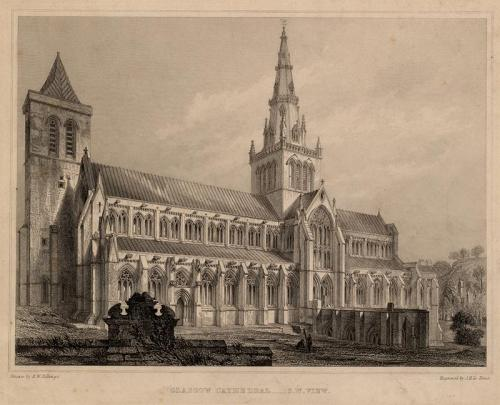
Glasgow Cathedral, Southwest View, engraving by John Henry Le Keux, 1847

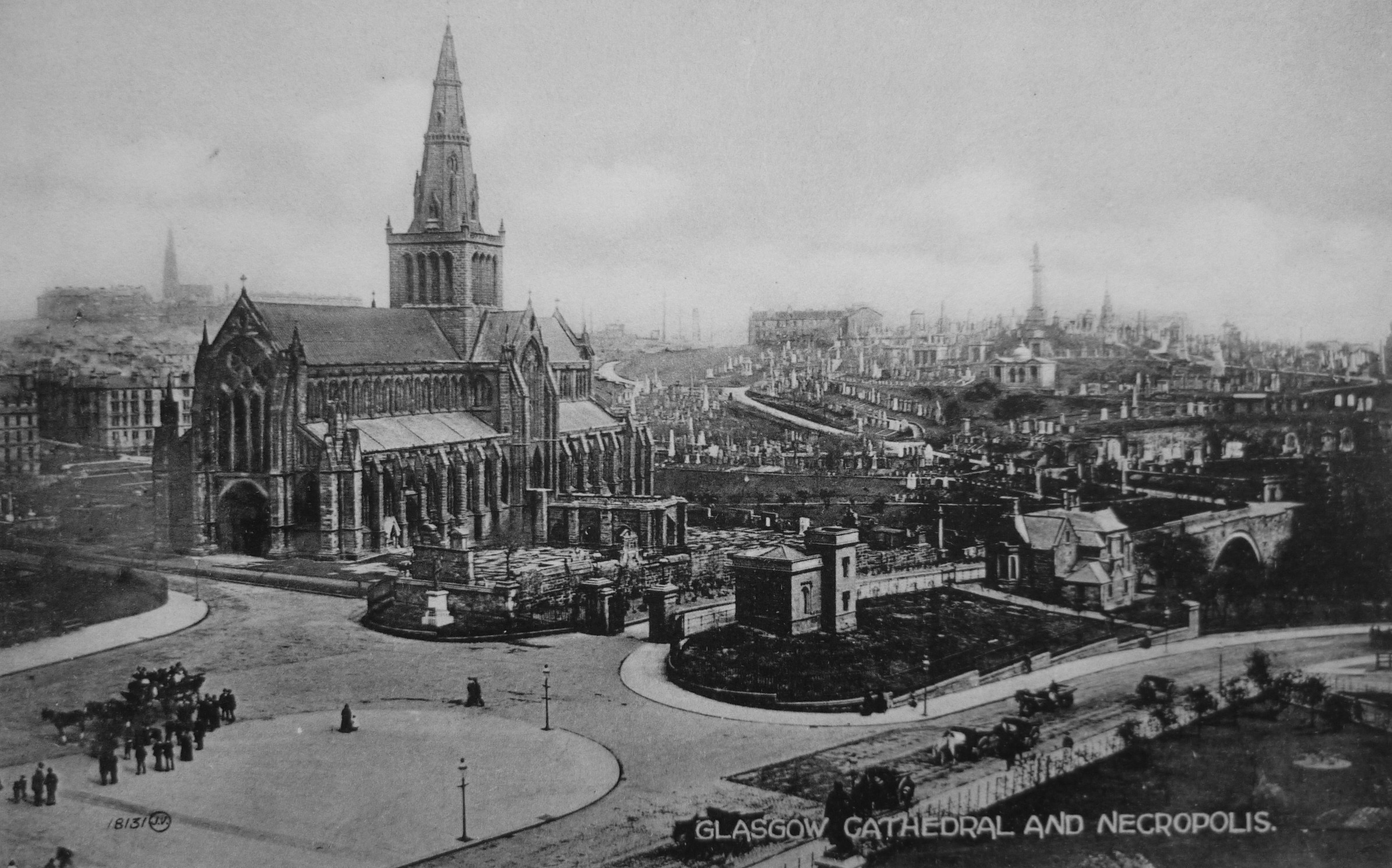
An old postcard view of the cathedral (1893)

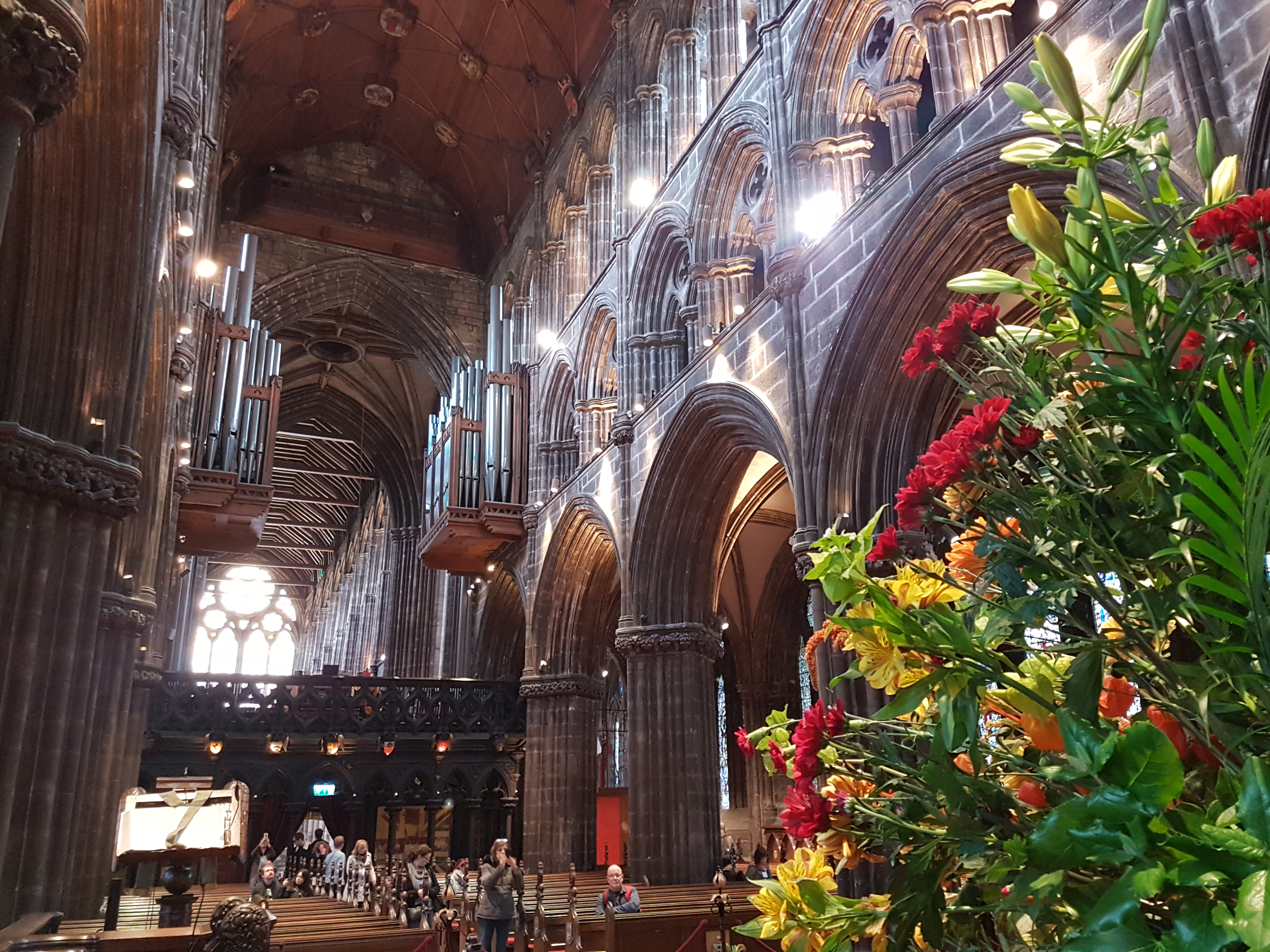
Choir viewed from the pulpit

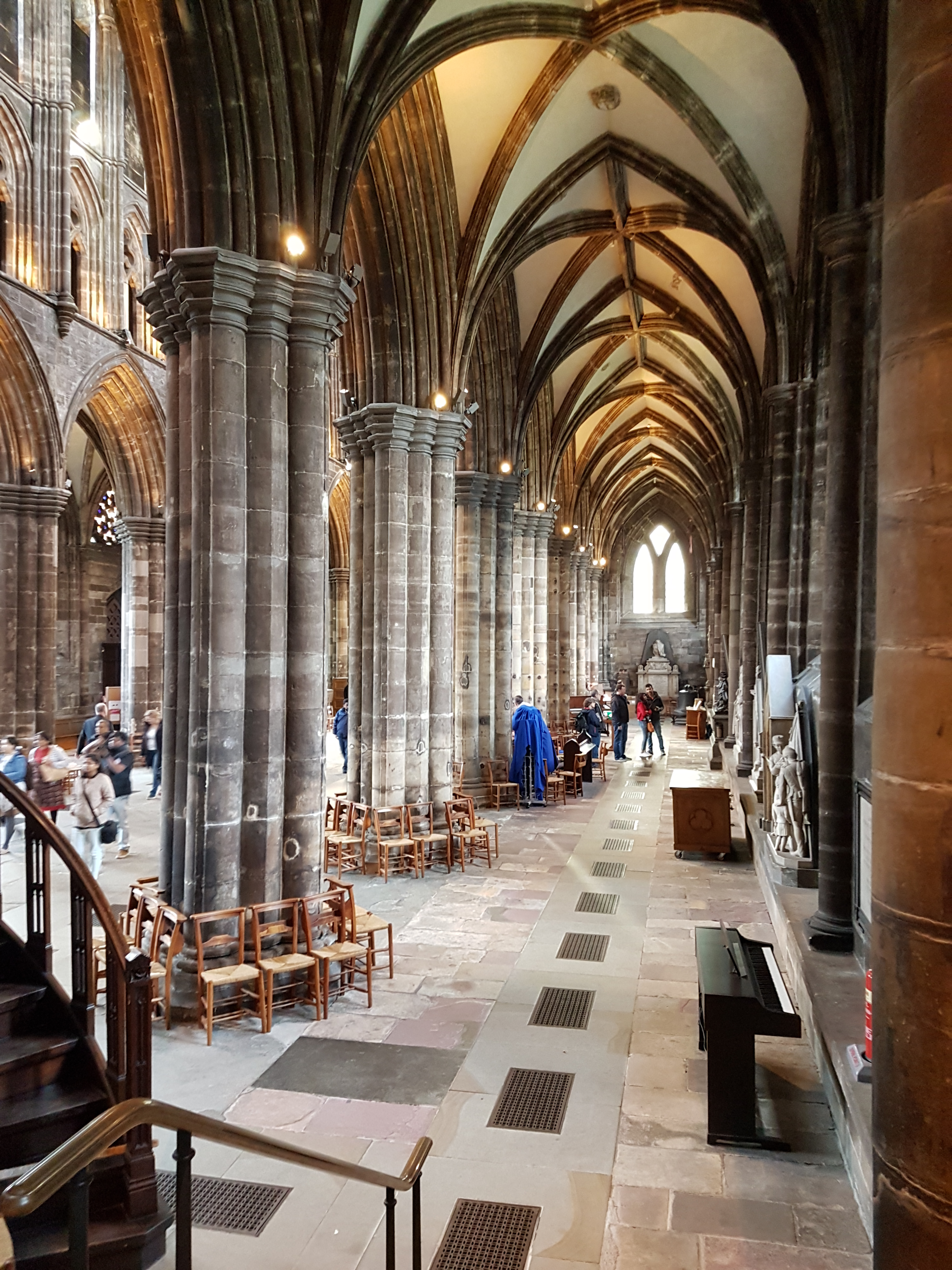
South aisle of the nave

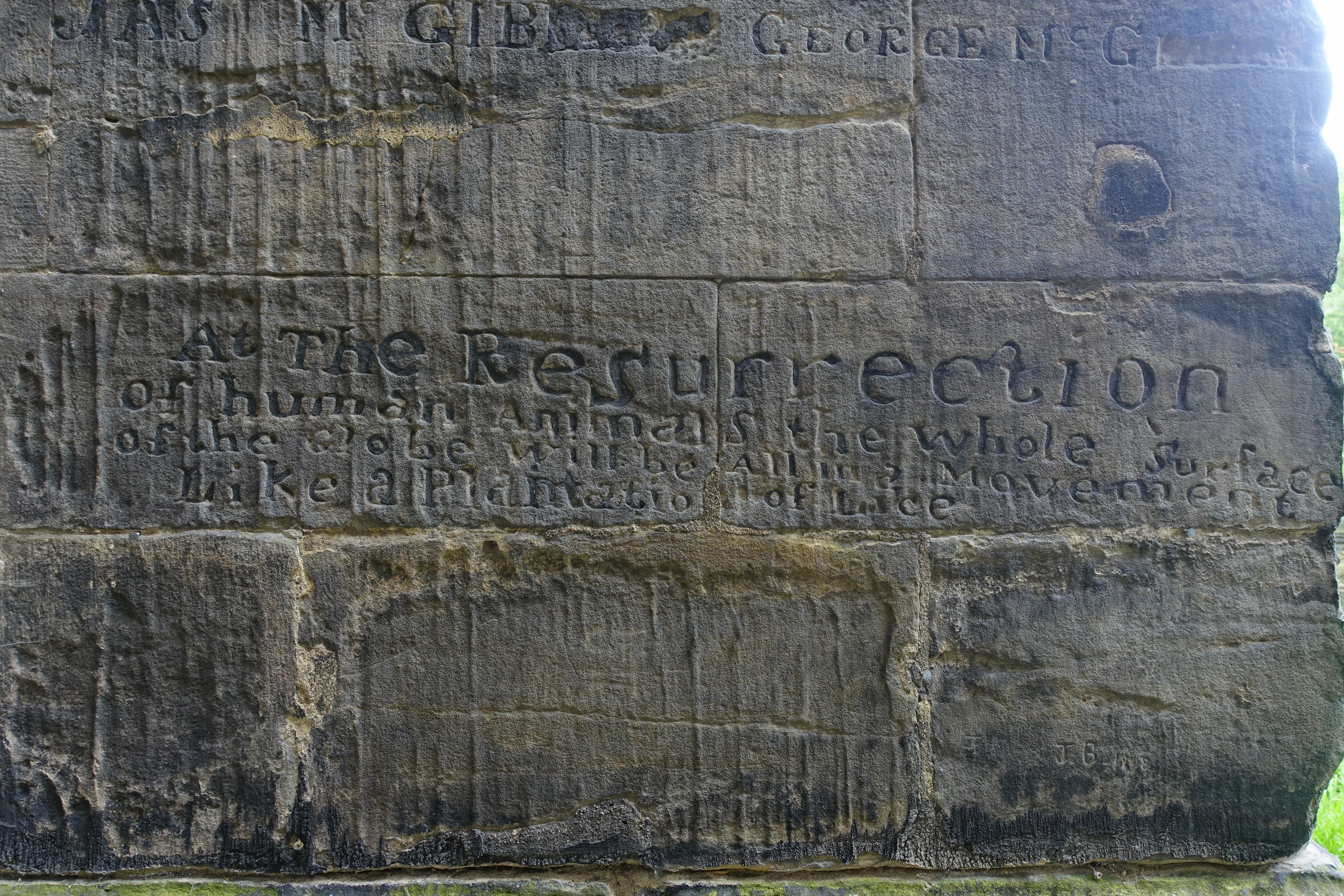
"At The Resurrection of human Animals the whole surface of the Globe will be All in a Movement Like a Plantation of Lice", graffiti on the outer south wall of the Chapter House

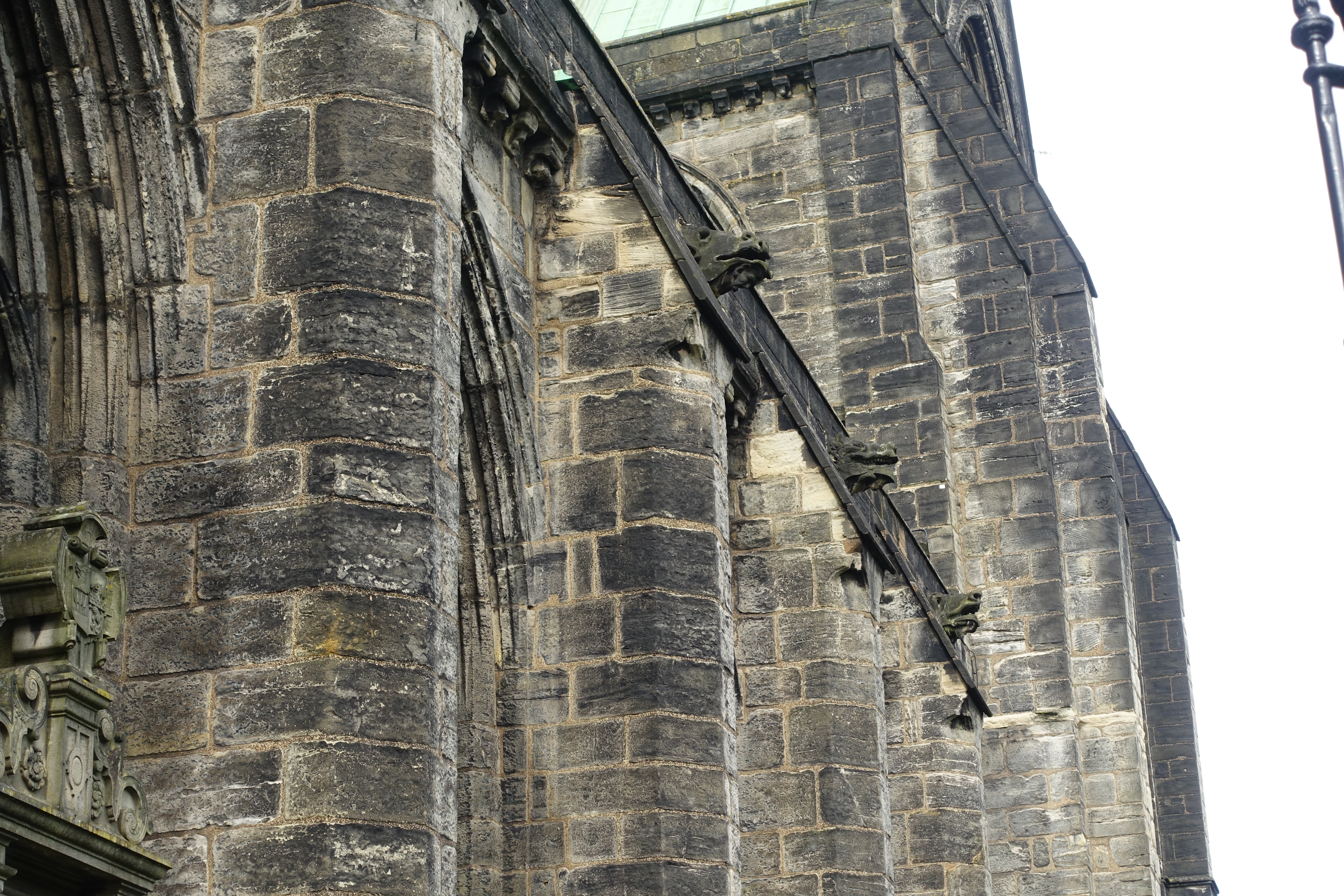
Gargoyles along the south side of the nave

== See also ==
- Bishop's Castle, Glasgow
- St. Andrew's Cathedral (Glasgow's Roman Catholic cathedral)
- St Luke's Cathedral (Glasgow's Greek Orthodox cathedral)
- St. Mary's Cathedral (Glasgow's Scottish Episcopal cathedral)
