= Battle of Glasgow (1560) =

Battle on 18 March 1560 between Scottish Reformation and French troops

- Part of The Reformation
Date	18 March 1560
Location	Glasgow, Scotland 52°21′N 14°33′E
Result	French victory

Belligerents
Kingdom of Scotland (Protestant)	Kingdom of France

Commanders and leaders
Earl of Arran; Earl of Glencairn	Unknown

Strength
Unknown	Unknown

Casualties and losses
Unknown	Unknown

The Battle of Glasgow, 18 March 1560, was fought by supporters of the Scottish Reformation against French troops.

== Background ==
The rule of Mary of Guise as Regent of Scotland was challenged by the Protestant Lords of the Congregation. Guise obtained French military support, and the Lords invited an English army under the terms of their Treaty of Berwick (1560). Just a few days before the conflict began to centre on the Siege of Leith, there was a battle at Glasgow.

== Battle ==
According to a French journal of events, the foot soldiers of the Congregation left Fife for Glasgow on 3 March 1560. The leader of the Lords of the Congregation, the former Regent Arran, left Glasgow for Hamilton on 17 March 1560, leaving 25 men in the Bishop's Palace and 13 in the Steeple of the Cathedral. Henri Cleutin, sieur de Villeparisis, led his French troops to Glasgow in the morning of 18 March. The mounted French Harquebusiers were resisted by 70 Scots commanded by a son of the Earl of Glencairn. This party had remained in Glasgow to destroy provisions left behind during the evacuation.

Twice the French and Scots fought at the bridge, but finally the Scots were drawn into the open and 'cut to pieces.' The others were taken prisoner, and the leaders hanged. Mercy was offered to any of the rest who renounced the Congregation. Later in the afternoon the garrison in the Palace and Steeple surrendered under terms. This French account of the battle is confirmed by a letter from Arran to Norfolk. Arran said he had left a garrison at Glasgow to buy 48 hours time. When the French entered the Castle they ignited gunpowder in one of the towers by accident and 13 were killed. Arran said there were 30 Scots fighting at the bridge who killed 8 Frenchmen.

The French then returned to Leith shadowed by 800 Scots horsemen led by James Hamilton, 3rd Earl of Arran. The Earl skirmished with the French at Callendar woods. The chronicler Robert Lindsay of Pitscottie points out that the Scots did not engage their full force with the French at this time because their allies, the English fleet commanded by William Winter, had just arrived.

== See also ==
- Battle of Glasgow (1544)
