= Andrew Forbes (organist) =

Andrew Forbes (born 1993 in Perth, Scotland) is a Scottish organist. He is the Director of Music of Glasgow Cathedral and the Artistic Director of Glasgow Cathedral Festival. He is an organist, harpsichordist and conductor as well as a trustee of the Glasgow Society of Organists. In addition to his work at Glasgow Cathedral, he has a freelance career as a soloist and ensemble player, with appearances on BBC TV and radio, and concert performances across Europe at venues including the Philharmonie de Paris. Since 2017 Forbes has taught organ in the junior department of the Royal Conservatoire of Scotland.

== Education and early career ==
Originally from Perth, Scotland, Forbes was educated at Perth Academy, receiving organ lessons from Eoin Bennet in St John's Kirk, Perth. He took an undergraduate degree in naval architecture at the University of Strathclyde, during which he held the post of organ scholar at University of Glasgow. In 2012 he played the grand organ of the Royal Albert Hall with the BBC Scottish Symphony Orchestra and NYOS for a performance of Respighi’s Pines of Rome. He was later organ scholar at St Mary's Episcopal Cathedral, Edinburgh, during which time he was made an Associate of the Royal College of Organists and won first prize at the Northern Ireland International Organ Competition. Forbes graduated MMus (Distinction) in 2017 from the Royal Conservatoire of Scotland, also winning the Prize for Early Music. In 2022 he performed Dick Lee's Winds of Change (2022), written for Forbes and the 1876 Father Willis organ in Cottiers, Glasgow.

== Glasgow Cathedral ==
In October 2014, Forbes was appointed as Director of Music of Glasgow Cathedral, becoming the youngest cathedral organist in the United Kingdom at the time. In 2016 he founded the Glasgow Cathedral Festival, an annual programme of multi-arts events based in the cathedral. On 11 November 2018 he directed Glasgow Cathedral Choir in a national service commemorating the centenary of World War 1, broadcast live on BBC One. Through Glasgow Cathedral Festival, Forbes commissioned Edwin Hillier's award-winning Dhatu, which had its premiere performance in Glasgow Cathedral.

== Discography ==
- Chris Hutchings — Requiem (Amemptos Music, July 2012)
- John Sheppard: Sacred Choral Music (Delphian, November 2013)
- Organ Splendour (NIIOC, August 2017)
