= Battle of Glasgow (1544) =

War of the Rough Wooing battle in Scotland

Coordinates: 55°51′46.7″N 4°14′4″W

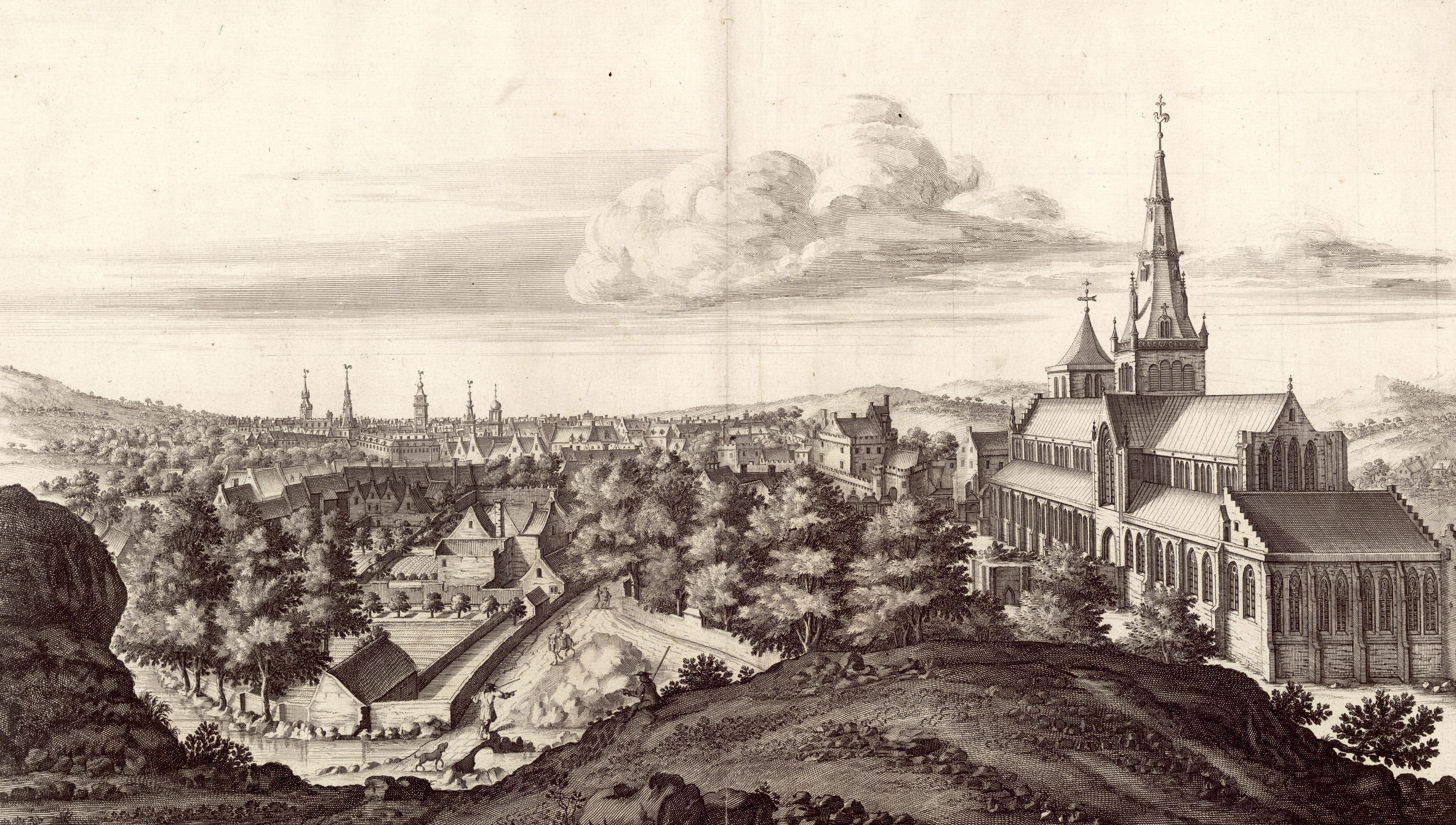
Glasgow Cathedral and its environs were fortified by the Earl of Lennox in 1544, (engraving by John Slezer, 1693)

The Battle of Glasgow was fought on 16 March 1544, between Matthew Stewart, 4th Earl of Lennox and the Scottish Regent James Hamilton, 2nd Earl of Arran, and their adherents, during the minority of Mary, Queen of Scots. There was a second battle at Glasgow Muir in May 1544, known as the Battle of the Butts, between Arran and the Earl of Glencairn.

== Prelude ==
The Earl of Lennox and William Cunningham, Earl of Glencairn continued to show support for the marriage of Prince Edward to Mary, Queen of Scots after the Parliament of Scotland had rejected this English marriage proposal. The rejection, a breach of the Treaty of Greenwich, resulted in the declaration of war, the war now called the Rough Wooing. Lennox and Glencairn were thus caught offside and technically traitors. Lennox wrote to Mary of Guise on 7 March 1544 hoping to buy time by offering his innocence to be tried before a convention of his peers. He wrote that it was heavily murmured by the Governor and his council;

"that I am the principell man that causis division and braik be in this realme and makis daily insurrectionis and disobeance contrar the authority."

However Arran had already ordered an attack on Glasgow. Artillery and hand guns were sent from Edinburgh Castle. Bothwell Castle was taken first on 8 March. Lennox's men took up position at the Castle and Cathedral, but he himself stayed at his stronghold, Dumbarton Castle.

== Battle ==
Hamilton's forces encountered Lennox's followers at Glasgow Muir (Moor), a mile east of the town. The battle started well for Lennox, his force of about 800 men drove the first rank of the more numerous forces of Hamilton back into the second rank and captured their cannon. At this juncture, Robert Boyd of Kilmarnock and his friend Mungo Mure of Rowallan, valiantly thrust themselves "into the midst of the combat", which resulted favourably for the Regent Hamilton at the end of the battle. There were about 300 slain on both sides. Lennox himself withdrew to Dumbarton Castle, his stronghold. According to an English messenger, Edward Storye, it was reported that Hamilton then took the town of Glasgow and laid siege to Bishop's Castle on Wednesday 26 March.

Amongst the casualties at the moor was Hamilton's Master of Household, and a Glasgow barber-surgeon was hired to look after the injured. The gunner, Hans Cochrane, directed the artillery at the cathedral and castle. When Lennox's garrison surrendered, gallows were set up in the street outside the Tolbooth to hang the leaders.

== Aftermath ==
The Earl of Glencairn's eldest son, Alexander Cunningham, Lord Kilmaurs, and Lennox's brother, Robert Stewart, Bishop-designate of Caithness, slipped away from Dumbarton Castle at night through the river Clyde, and then rode through the west country to England.

For his timely service in the battle, Robert Boyd was rewarded with the family lands (which he held in tack), as well as the restoration of his family's title of Lord Boyd.

Soon after this battle, in May 1544, an English army burnt Edinburgh. Around 24 May 1544, Regent Arran fought another battle on Glasgow Moor with the Earl of Glencairn. Glencairn's son, Andrew Cunningham, and John Hamilton of Cambuskeith, Arran's Master of Household, were killed at this battle. Glencairn retreated, and Lennox, being unable to regain possession of Dumbarton Castle, after it had been seized, sailed for England around 28 May 1544.

Ten years later, a number of men received pardons for their presence at the battle on Lennox's side against the Regent, including: William Cunningham, Earl of Glencairn; John Grant of Freuchie; George Forrester of Kiddisdale; Robert Hamilton of Briggis; George Hay, 7th Earl of Erroll; Robert Drummond of Carnock; and John Wemyss of that ilk.

== In Scottish chronicles ==
Writing about thirty years later, John Lesley and Claude Nau gave a detailed version of events. In their account, the Governor, Regent Arran, had heard that Lennox had left Glasgow and came with an army including Lord Boyd. Lennox had departed to Dumbarton Castle. The Earl of Glencairn, with his followers and men of the Lennox, Renfrew and Glasgow town, met Arran's forces on Glasgow Muir (Moor) a mile east of the town. After a long fight with many casualties Regent Arran appeared to have won the day. Arran then entered Glasgow and besieged the Bishop's Palace and Cathedral where Lennox had placed his artillery. The garrison surrendered and 16 or 18 leaders were hanged. Lord Boyd convinced Arran not to destroy and burn more buildings. Lennox sent the Earl of Angus and Lord Maxwell to negotiate a truce but he imprisoned them at Blackness Castle and Hamilton. Maxwell was indeed warded at Hamilton Castle in April 1544 and wrote to Mary of Guise for her intercession.

George Buchanan also gives a brief account of the battle. Again, while Lennox was absent, Glencairn held off Arran's troops until Robert Boyd's charge. Buchanan mentions the Regent's troops carrying off the window shutters and doors of houses in Glasgow, but not the defence of the Castle and Cathedral. Robert Lindsay of Pitscottie describes Lennox's hopes for the regency of Scotland and disappointment with Cardinal Beaton. Lennox and the Earl of Bothwell were set up as rivals for the hand of Mary of Guise. Lennox fortified Glasgow and Arran brought artillery against him. Pitscottie gives the date of the encounter as 28 March 1544 and says the siege lasted 10 days. He adds a detail that the captains of the Castle were won over by promises of gold, then hanged. Pitscottie says this was the Cardinal's idea.

Some details check out: there is a record that Lennox was encouraged in the idea he might marry Mary of Guise. However, the four later 16th-century chronicles strongly reflect their authors' own political and religious viewpoints and tend to include partisan detail and suggestion.

== See also ==
- Battle of Glasgow (1560)
