= Blackadder (disambiguation) =

Blackadder is a British television show starring Rowan Atkinson.

Blackadder or Blackader may also refer to:

== Places ==
- Blackadder Water, a river in the Scottish Borders
- Blackadder House, an estate near Allanton, Scotland
- Blackadder, Scottish Borders, a Scottish village

== People and families ==
- Blackadder (surname), a surname
- Charles Blackader (1869–1921), a British Army officer
- Clan Blackadder, a Scottish clan
- Blackadder baronets, a Scottish baronetcy

== Other uses ==
- Blackadder (clipper), a clipper ship built in 1870
- Blackadder (whisky bottler), an independent bottler of Scotch whisky
- Blackadder ITC, an OpenType font

== See also ==
- Black adder (disambiguation), snakes
