= Allanton, Scottish Borders =

Village in Scottish Borders, Scotland

Coordinates: 55.78159°N 2.21538°W

Allanton
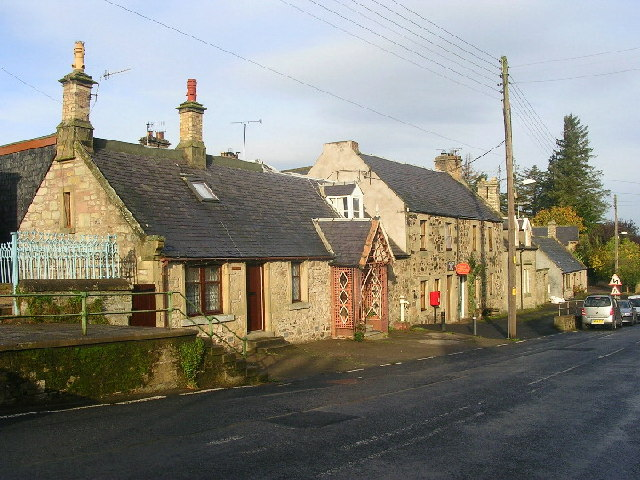
- Allanton Village

- Location within the Scottish Borders
- OS grid reference: NT8654
- Council area: Scottish Borders
- Lieutenancy area: Berwickshire
- Country: Scotland
- Sovereign state: United Kingdom
- Post town: Duns
- Postcode district: TD11
- Dialling code: 01890
- Police: Scotland
- Fire: Scottish
- Ambulance: Scottish
- UK Parliament: Berwickshire, Roxburgh and Selkirk
- Scottish Parliament: Ettrick, Roxburgh and Berwickshire

Allanton (Scottish Gaelic: Baile Alain) is a small village in the Scottish Borders region of Scotland. Historically part of Berwickshire, for many years it was part of the estate of Blackadder House, which was demolished around 1925.

== Locality ==
Allanton is in Edrom Parish, a rural Parish of east central Berwickshire being bounded on the north by the Parishes of Bunkle and Preston and Chirnside, on the east by the Parishes of Chirnside, Hutton and Whitsome and Hilton, on the south by the Parishes of Whitsome and Hilton, Swinton and Fogo and on the west by the Parishes of Langton and Duns.

Allanton lies one mile (2 km) south of Chirnside and six miles (10 km) west of the border with Northumberland. Its closest market towns are Duns and Berwick-upon-Tweed. The village stands high above the confluence of the Whiteadder and Blackadder Waters, the site of two bridges.

Allanton Bridge forms two spans over the Whiteadder Water, dated 1841, by Robert Stevenson and Sons. Blackadder Bridge spans the Blackadder Water, dated 1851. In a copse between the two bridges is an early 19th-century ferryman's cottage (ruined).

‘Adder’ is from the old English word ‘awedur’, meaning ‘running water’ or ‘stream’. There is mention of Blakadir de Eodem (of that ilk) holding lands in the earldom of March in 1426.

== History and legend ==
=== Blackadders and Homes ===
The village was traditionally part of the estate of the Blackadders, a powerful border clan. The Blackadder family were an integral part of the constant Borders’ feuds, and opportunistically extended their lands by grants from King James II of Scotland. These were bestowed as a reward for repelling English raids with great ferocity. During an invasion of Scotland in 1482, the Duke of Gloucester, later Richard III of England, came to Blackadder Castle with his ally Alexander Stewart, Duke of Albany, who ordered the "great house and tower of Blackadder" to be destroyed.

In 1518 the Borders holdings of Clan Blackadder were taken into the family of Home (now the Home Robertson family) by the enforced marriage of the daughters of Robert Blackadder to younger sons of Home of Wedderburn. A junior branch of the Blackadders, Lairds of Tulliallan disputed the succession, but without success. Sir John Home was created Baronet of Blackadder in 1671. Wedderburn Castle is still owned by Robert Blackadder's descendant, Georgina Home-Robertson.

=== Pearlin Jean ===
Allanbank House, the Dower House to Blackadder House, was notoriously haunted by Pearlin Jean. Reputedly a French woman (possibly a nun), whom the first baronet of Allanbank, then Mr Stuart, met with at Paris.

So called for the diaphanous lace in which she appeared, Jean was the Stuart's lover, until his return to Scotland. When she went to try and stop Stuart leaving her, he ordered his coachman to drive on. Jean fell and Stuart's carriage ran over Jean, killing her.

=== Twice Buried McGall ===
Nearby Edrom was notable as the site of a notorious incident of body snatching in 1826, which resulted in a riot in Duns. After its recovery, the body of Peter McGall was buried for a second time and it is believed that one Mary Manuel from Allanton claimed a possible unique distinction of preparing a body for burial not once but twice.

== The village ==
Allanton is a single street, mostly lined with single-storey terraced cottages. The earliest were built in the late 18th to early 19th century with gardens, on feus granted by Steuart of Allanbank. In the 20th century the village was notable as a village of tailors' shops, having three, the last of which closed in the 1960s. All three are now private residences. The village contains a public house and restaurant, a village hall, a children's playground and a public telephone booth. The Village Post Office closed in 2006.

Allanbrae (John Lessels 1854), at the northwest of the village overlooking the confluence of the Whiteadder and Blackadder Waters, was formerly a school for the daughters of senior staff on the Blackadder Estate.

The Old Bakehouse, at the southern end of the western terrace, is a stone built end terraced cottage dating back to the early nineteenth century, and formerly the bakehouse to the Blackadder estate. Adjacent Sheaf House was once the bakers' shop for the Bakehouse.

Allanton Village Hall, the former schoolroom, breaks the western terrace of cottages in the middle of the village.

Opposite the hall is Holmeknowe, a two-story stone house notable for tripartite segmental-arched windows – the centre one originally forming the doorway to the tailor's shop. A single-storey workroom was situated to the rear, with an exterior stable-block. It has a feu dating back to 1764.

Brunton House is a large stone-built Victorian villa, with the remnants of workshops behind the main building. The Brunton family were renowned tailors in Edinburgh and moved the business to Allanton in 1873 and had the present property built in 1897. It is now a family home, upon two floors, though retains many features of the Tailor's shop.

The Allanton Inn forms the southern end of the eastern terrace, formerly two cottages joined in the 1830s. It is joined to the Old Fire Station (originally a stable and hayloft for the Inn).

The village also contains several other buildings relating to the Blackadder Estate: the Smiddy House, the two entrance lodges – Lydd Cottage and Westside Cottage (south west), and the Carter's House (east terrace).

Several houses in Allanton and on the Blackadder Estate use a common motif in their architecture: Tudor Style hood moulds, and fish scale bands of green, red and grey roof slating. This motif is seen on the Smiddy House, Sheaf House, North Lodge and Ardsheil among others.

== Blackadder House ==
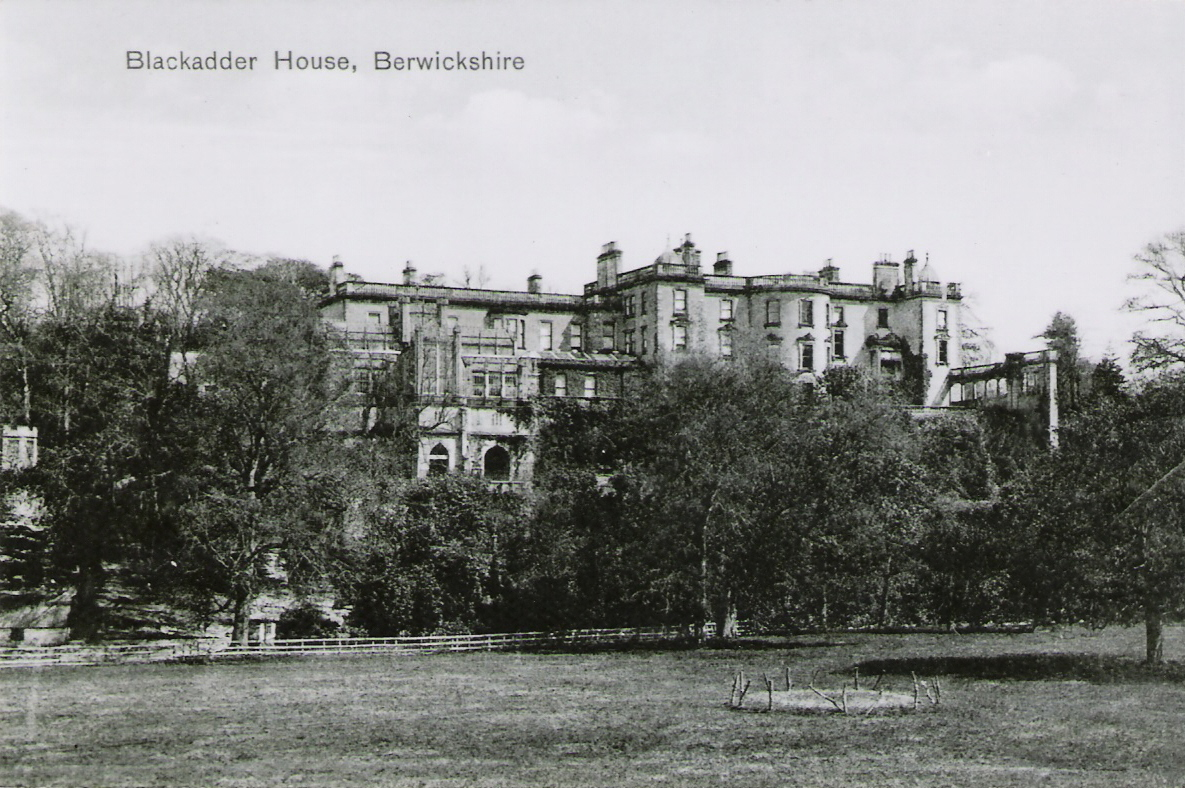

Within Allanton's main street still stand a pair of splay-fronted lodges (Lydd Cottage and Westside Cottage), defining the entrance to the former Blackadder House, a magnificent classical house built in Palladian style around an earlier tower house. The farm of Blackadder Mains along with Blackadder Bank, Blackadder West and Blackadder Mount and the nearby village of Allanton were all originally part of the Blackadder Estate which surrounded Blackadder House. The house was serviced by a small army of servants, many of whom were housed in the village. During the nineteenth century the Estate was owned by the Boswall family. When Euphemia Boswall inherited it in 1830 she was considered to be one of the richest heiresses in Britain.

During World War I the mansion was requisitioned by the government as accommodation for troops, who vandalised the building, using parts of the grand staircase bannisters for firewood. The post-war government refused to pay for the restitution of the house to its former state and with the agricultural depression it was closed up. It was demolished circa 1925. Little remains of the house other than a folly walkway with stone balustrade which was at the back of the house below ground level, cut into the rock of a cliff face that overlooks the river Blackadder below. Where the house was, a wood was planted. Below the folly on the bank of the river the remains of the hydro electric power house is still visible (Blackadder House was reputedly the first in Berwickshire to have electric lighting).

Other buildings built to service the estate remain. Blackadder Cottage (or the 'Butler's House') with an impressive pair of lions on the parapet, sits on a high bank above the Blackadder Water. Allanbank Courtyard is a U-planned steading begun c. 1780. There is also a Walled Garden with a Summerhouse, and several bridges over the Blackadder Water. An impressive stable range with tower and obelisk steeple survive the destruction of the house.

== See also ==
- Allanbank, Scottish Borders
