= Edrom =

Village in Scottish Borders, Scotland

Coordinates: 55.7935°N 2.2736°W

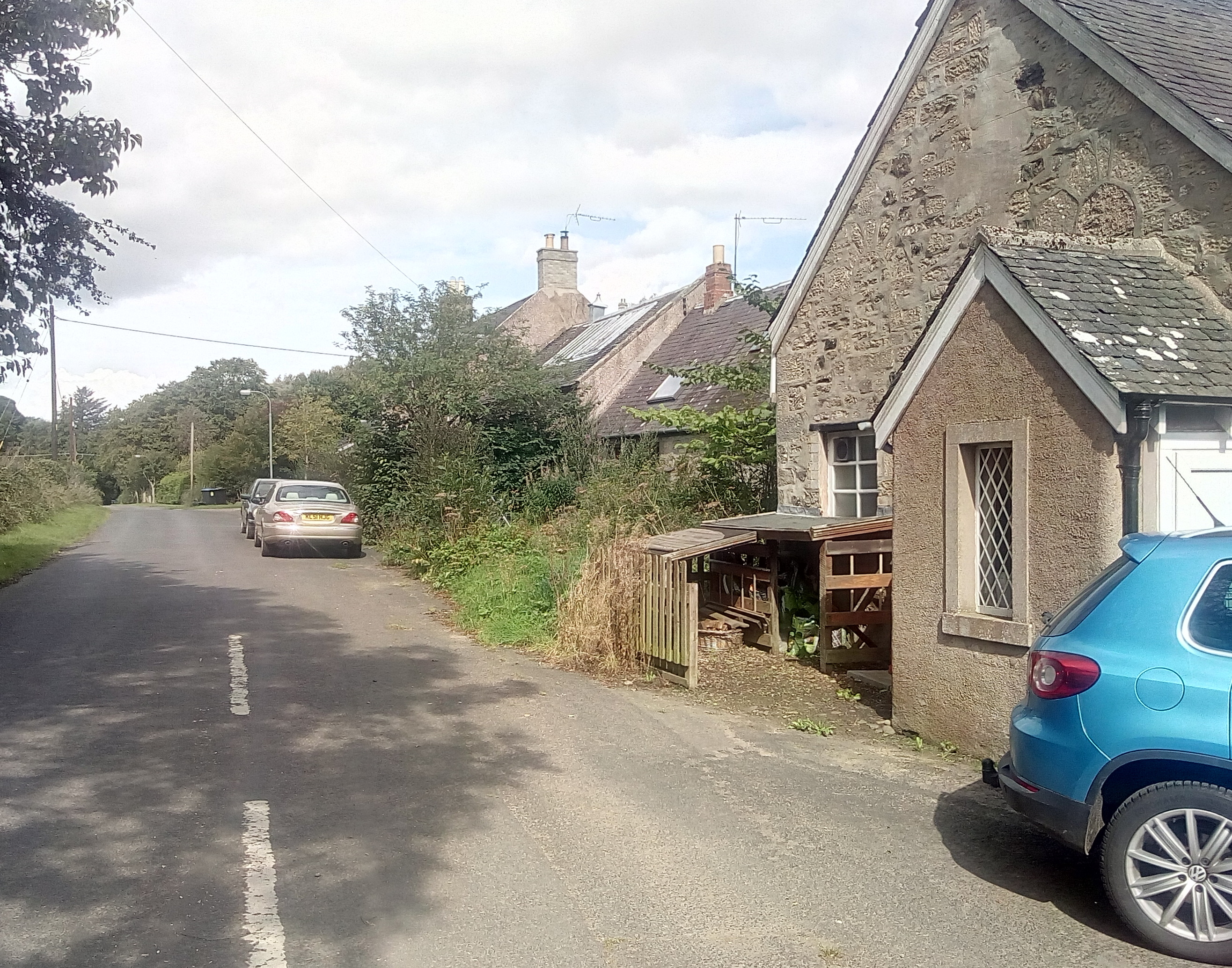
- in 2018

- Location within the Scottish Borders
- OS grid reference: NT8255
- Council area: Scottish Borders
- Lieutenancy area: Berwickshire
- Country: Scotland
- Sovereign state: United Kingdom
- Post town: DUNS
- Postcode district: TD11
- Dialling code: 01890
- Police: Scotland
- Fire: Scottish
- Ambulance: Scottish
- UK Parliament: Berwickshire, Roxburgh and Selkirk
- Scottish Parliament: Ettrick, Roxburgh and Selkirk

Edrom is a parish and small village in the pre-1975 ancient county of Berwickshire, now an administrative area of the Scottish Borders region of Scotland.

The rural parish of Edrom is in east central Berwickshire being bounded on the north by the parishes of Bunkle and Preston and Chirnside, on the east by the Parishes of Chirnside, Hutton and Whitsome and Hilton, on the south by the parishes of Whitsome and Hilton, Swinton and Fogo and on the west by the parishes of Langton and Duns. It includes the nearby village of Allanton.

== Locality ==
Edrom lies three miles north-east of Duns, and close to the Whiteadder Water.

Nearby are Allanbank, Allanton, the Blackadder Water, Blanerne Castle, Chirnside, Chirnsidebridge, Foulden, Gavinton, Hutton, Kimmerghame House, Manderston House, Preston, Wedderburn Castle, and the former Kelloe House.

== Village ==
The village contains several notable buildings, including the Manse, 1881, and the former school, early 19th century. The schoolroom, now the Village Hall, is very likely the Sewing School erected in 1866.

Edrom Newton Farm, with a neo-Jacobean steading, is a late 18th or early 19th century farm house built by Richard Miller of Manderston; it is notable for its pavilions with Venetian windows.

Edrom Farm Cottages are a stylish group of neo-Jacobean cottages, 1876, just to the east of the steading.

Two bridges, Kelloe Bridge and Todheugh Bridge, cross the Blackadder Water and the Whiteadder Water respectively.

== Parish Church ==
A parish church was granted to Durham Cathedral in the early 12th century.

The Logan Aisle, to the west of the church, contains what is described as the finest piece of Romanesque architectural sculpture in Scotland — the reset doorway from the main church. This dates from the 12th century, and is now somewhat worn.

== Edrom House ==
Thought to date from circa 1740, and a somewhat dated design for that time, Edrom House is a simple classical rectangular piend-roofed house. A design introduced by Sir William Bruce in the 17th century.

Edrom House was the home of the International Cello Centre, a residential school for musicians of varying ages and backgrounds run by John Gwilt, Jane and Christopher Cowan, where Steven Isserlis and Steven Doane trained in the 1970s. The school is no longer based at Edrom and is now called The Edrom Casals Centre.

== Berwickshire Railway ==
Edrom had a railway station on the North British Railway's Berwickshire Railway (opened 1863). The railway line ran from Reston to Earlston, joining the East Coast Main Line to the Waverley Line. A five span rounded arch railway bridge was built over the Whiteadder Water, in the hamlet of Chirnsidebridge, in 1863 to carry the railway.

Edrom Railway Station was closed to passenger traffic 10 September 1951. Freight continued until 19 July 1965. The station had a single platform. The station building, platform and goods shed remain intact.

== Body Snatching ==
Edrom was notable as the site of Body snatching which resulted in a riot in Duns.

== Notable people ==
- George Buchan of Kelloe (1775–1856), Church of Scotland elder. Secretary to the Governor of Madras.
- Alexander Christison (1751–1820), began his career as schoolmaster of Edrom.
- Robert Fortune (1812–1880), botanist and plant hunter, was born in Edrom.

== See also ==
- List of places in the Scottish Borders
- List of places in Scotland

== Bibliography ==
- Borders and Berwick by Charles Alexander Strang, The Rutland Press, 1994, ISBN 1-873190-10-7
- The Buildings of Scotland - Borders, by Kitty Cruft, John Dunbar and Richard Fawcett, Yale University Press, 2006, ISBN 0-300-10702-1
- Knight Frank (2002) Edrom House, Duns, Berwickshire: Sale particulars, Lauder. Held at RCAHMS
- National Library of Scotland, Memorials of a Border Family, history of the Logan Home family
