= Clan Blackadder =

Scottish clan

- Motto: Courage Helps Fortune

Profile
- Region: Scottish Lowlands
- District: Fife and Berwick-upon-Tweed
- Clan Blackadder no longer has a chief, and is an armigerous clan
- Historic seat: Old Tulliallan Castle, Kincardine, Fife
Allied clans
Clan Douglas

Clan Blackadder is a Scottish clan. The clan historically held lands near the Anglo-Scottish border.

== Clan status ==
Today Clan Blackadder does not have a chief recognised by the Lord Lyon King of Arms, therefore the clan has no standing under Scots law. Clan Blackadder is considered an armigerous clan, meaning that it is considered to have had at one time a chief who possessed the chiefly arms; however, no one at present is in possession of such arms. The arms of Blackadder of that Ilk are blazoned as: Azure, on a chevron Argent three roses Gules.

== Name ==
The clan name is a territorial name derived from the lands of Blackadder in Berwickshire. The lands, in turn, are named after the Blackadder Water, a river which is part of the River Tweed system, and which runs through the Scottish Borders. The name Blackadder is derived from the Old English awedur which means "running water" or "stream". George Fraser Black states that in 1426, Blakadir de Eodem (of that Ilk) held the lands in the earldom of March. Early bearers of the surname are Adam of Blacathathir in 1477, Robert Blackader in the 15th century, and Charles Blakater in 1486.

According to a 1942 book on the Berwickshire dialect, the name was then pronounced ble-ke-TAR.

== Eminence in 1450–1518 ==
=== Fife branch ===
A junior branch moved to Tulliallan in Fife and included Robert Blackadder, bishop and then in 1492 the first Archbishop of Glasgow, who added the eponymous crypt and aisle in Glasgow Cathedral. The archbishop died while on a pilgrimage to the Holy Land in 1508. The Fife branch were supporters of Clan Douglas. In 1471 the archbishop was also made Abbot of Melrose, not far from the main Blackadder lands.

Sir John Blackadder of Tullialan was made a baronet in 1626. The title was allowed to lapse with his death, although the celebrated covenanting preacher John Blackadder (1622–1685) was legally the heir. The preacher's son Colonel John Blackadder later became governor of Stirling Castle.

=== Main branch ===
The Blackadders of that Ilk were border reivers, involved in the deadly raids and feuds along the Anglo–Scottish border during the 15th and 16th centuries. Their base by the Blackadder Water was near Berwick-upon-Tweed, a town that changed hands 13 times between England and Scotland in the period 1147–1482.

The family gained lands from James II of Scotland in reward for their deeds in repelling in English raids. In 1518 the family lost their Border lands by the forced marriages of the two heiresses of Robert Blackadder of that Ilk to the neighbouring Clan Home (pronounced "Hume"). This process became known as "the fraud of the Homes". According to the 19th-century historian William Anderson, the marriages were achieved in the following way.

Andrew Blackadder followed the standard of Douglas at Flodden in 1513 and was slain along with two hundred gentlemen of that name on that disastrous field leaving a widow and two daughters, Beatrix and Margaret, who at the time were mere children. From the unprotected state of Robert's daughters, the Homes of Wedderburn formed a design of seizing the lands of Blackadder. They began by cutting off all within their reach whose affinity was dreaded as an hereditary obstacle. They attacked Robert Blackadder, the Prior of Coldingham, and assassinated him. His brother, the Dean of Dunblane, shared the same fate. Various others were dispatched in like manner. They now assaulted the Castle of Blackadder where the widow and her two young daughters resided. The garrison refused to surrender but the Homes succeeded in obtaining possession of the fortress, seized the widow and her children, compelling them into forced marriages. The two daughters were contracted to younger sons, John and Robert Home in 1518, and, as they were only in their eighth year, they were confined in the Castle of Blackadder until they came of age.

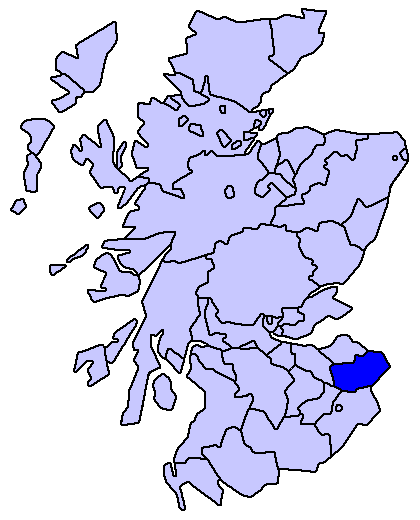
Map of Berwickshire

This process was challenged by a Blackadder kinsman, Sir John Blackadder who held the lands of Tulliallan. He attempted to gain assistance from the Parliament, and also attempted to use force to regain the former Blackadder possessions. In March 1531, he was beheaded for the murder of the Abbot of Culross, in the dispute. Sir John Blackadder was succeeded by his brother Patrick, who also took action to regain the lands from the Homes. Anderson's version of events has Patrick ambushed and murdered by the Homes, while he was attempting to meet them and resolve the dispute.

By 1567 the dispute had died down, as the Tulliallan branch and the Homes of Wedderburn were allies of Mary, Queen of Scots on the losing side in the important Battle of Carberry Hill. After the battle Mary abdicated as queen.

Subsequently, the Blackadders relinquished their claim to the Border lands, and in 1671 Sir John Home was created Baronet of Blackadder. Some members of the clan continued to farm their lands as tenants of the Homes, and the last family burials at Edrom kirk were made in the 1980s.

William Francis Blackadder played in the Scottish rugby team in 1938, and was awarded the DSO and OBE as an RAF ace in World War II.

== See also ==
- Blackadder baronets
- Blackadder (disambiguation)
- Blackadder House
- Elizabeth Blackadder
- Rosemary Blackadder
