= Blackadder, Scottish Borders =

Village in Scottish Borders, Scotland

Coordinates: 55.76380°N 2.24699°W

Blackadder is a hamlet on the B6460, in the Scottish Borders area of Scotland, located at grid reference NT846523.

Places nearby include Allanton, Duns, Edrom, Fogo, Gavinton, and Whitsome.

== See also ==
- List of places in the Scottish Borders
- List of places in Scotland
