= Flag of Berwickshire =

Historic Scottish county flag

Berwickshire
- Proportion: 3:5
- Adopted: 14 November 2023

The Berwickshire flag is the flag of the Scottish county of Berwick, registered with the Flag Institute in 2023.

== History ==
On 5 February 2023, the Berwickshire Civic Society announced that it was organising a competition to produce a flag for the county. The competition was announced in May that year, with 203 submissions received from 1 June to 14 August 2023. An assessment panel, including representatives from the community, Lord Lieutenancy and local schools, as well as the Flag Institute and the Lyon Court, chose a final set of five designs which were put to a public vote in September 2023. The winner was announced on 13 November.

== Design ==
The flag consists of two horizontal panels, blue above green, recalling Berwickshire’s coast, rivers and land. The blue panel features a salmon representing the importance of sea and coarse fishing to the county, as well as the Berwickshire Marine Reserve. On the green panel is an ear of barley representing local agriculture and also a possible origin of the name Berwickshire.

Between the panels a chain represents the Union Chain Bridge that spans the River Tweed between Berwickshire and Northumberland.

The Pantone colours for the flag are:

- Blue 280
- Silver 420
- Green 356
- Gold 123
- White
- Charcoal 426

== Contenders ==
Design A

The black bear is taken from the coat of arms of the former Berwickshire County Council, where it served as part of a pun on the county's name ("Bear-Wych-Shire"). The wavy black and white lines represent the Blackadder Water and Whiteadder Water rivers respectively, while the wavy green line stands for the hills. The wavy lines can also evoke the curves of the River Tweed, the curves of Berwickshire's coast, and the curves of the county's moors where they meet the lowlands of the Merse.

Design B

The black shape in the hoist resembles a stylised "B" for Berwickshire, with the jagged lines also invoking the rugged terrain of the western part of the county. The blue, white and green stripe pattern represents the floodplain of east Berwickshire, from which the Merse gets its name.

Design C

The white tree is a wych elm, which appeared on the arms of the former county council as part of a pun on Berwickshire's name ("Bear-Wych-Shire"). The black castle wall (specifically modelled after the walls of Hume Castle) along the bottom stands for the abundance of castles present throughout the county, as well as Berwickshire's location on the border between Scotland and England.

Design D

The winning design.

Design E

The pall shape represents the confluence of the Blackadder Water and Whiteadder Water rivers as they flow through the green lands of the heart of Berwickshire. The checkered black-and-white pattern evokes the scales of an actual adder, serving as a further homage to the rivers' names. Additionally, the pattern references the colour scheme of the Border tartan, and can also be seen as a nod to the checkered flag used in motor racing, thus symbolising Berwickshire's motorsport heritage.
