= Bonkyl Church =

Coordinates: 55°49′44″N 2°18′26″W

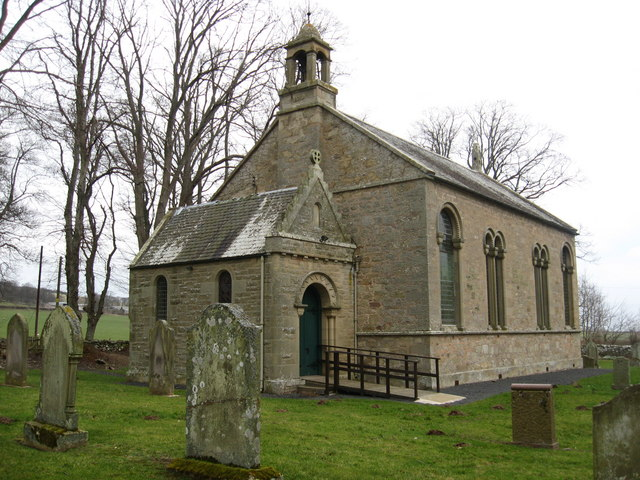
Bonkyl Kirk

Bonkyl Church (also spelled Buncle or Bunkle) (Scottish Gaelic: Bun na Cille = 'the hill foot of the church') is a Church of Scotland kirk situated at grid reference NT808595 5 miles (8 kilometres) northeast of Duns in the old county of Berwickshire. The nearest hamlet is Preston just over 2 miles (3 kilometres) to the south-west.

== History ==
There has been a religious establishment at Bonkyl since the early 12th century, and it was part of the vicarage of Dunkeld before 1275. The early proprietor of the church was Sir Alexander de Bonkyl, but the church passed into the care of his daughter Margaret in 1304. After the death of Margaret, the Bonkyl estate and church passed down to her son, Sir Alexander Stewart of Bonkyl.

During the Second War of Scottish Independence the location was contested by Thomas Ughtred, a future Knight of the Garter. The care and maintenance of the church then passed to the Douglas Earls of Angus, descendants of the Stewarts, before finally passing to the Earl of Home in 1877. The church was a separate parish until 1621 when it was co-joined with the nearby parish of Preston. In 1958, the churches were joined by Reston, then Chirnside in 1973. The present church is a Category B listed building.

The ancient church at Bonkyl fell into ruin and was demolished in 1820 when the present church was built. All that is left of the old church is a Norman apse, a vaulted arch which was later used as a burial vault of the Homes of Billie. It is thought to be the oldest of its kind in Scotland, having been built in the early 12th century and is a designated scheduled monument.

== Ministers in the early years of the reformed church ==
- 1582 - 1598 William Sinclair
- 1599 - 1607 George Redpath
- 1607 - 1612 Matthew Carrail
- 1612 - 1621 John Gaittis

== Gallery ==
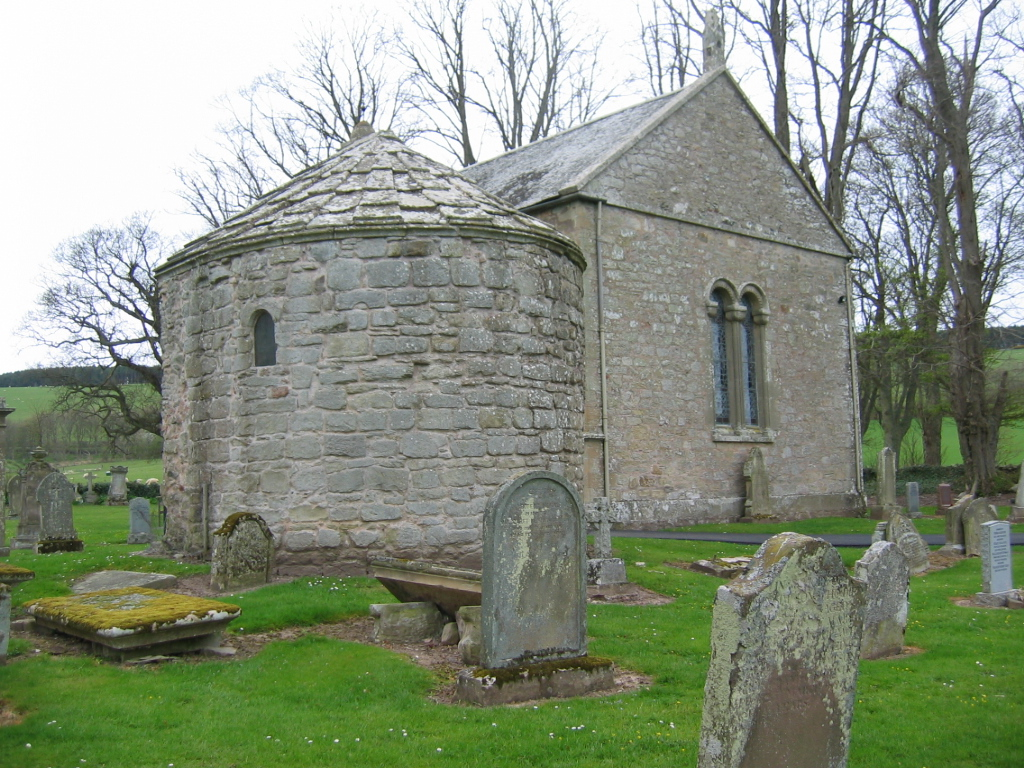

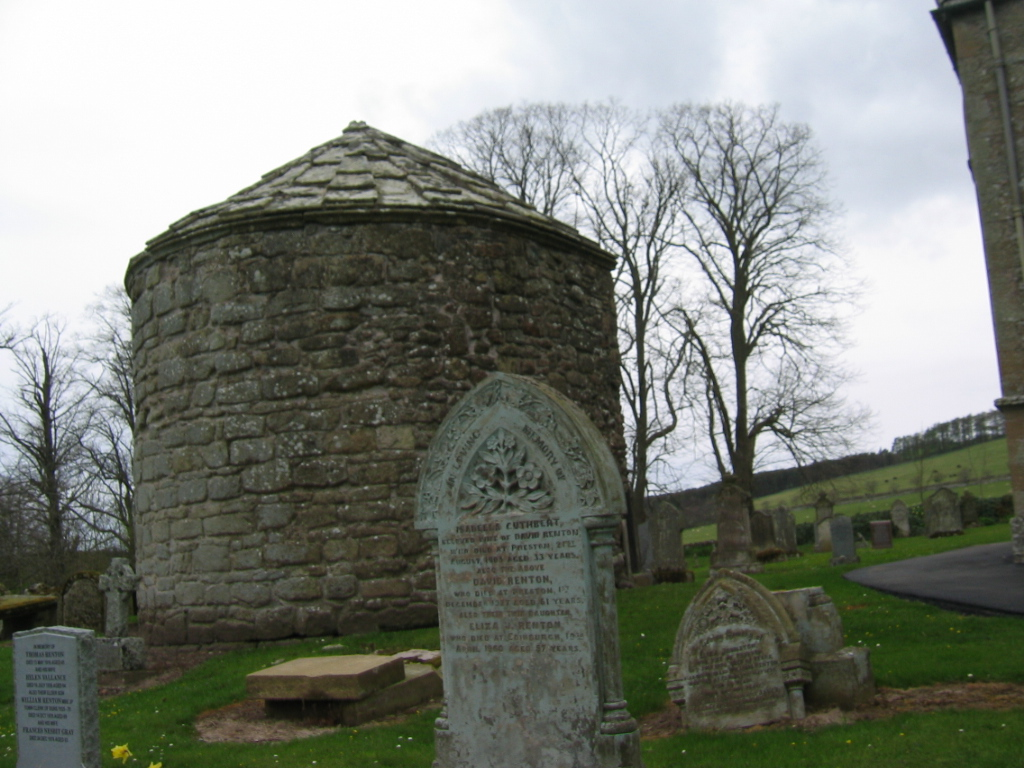

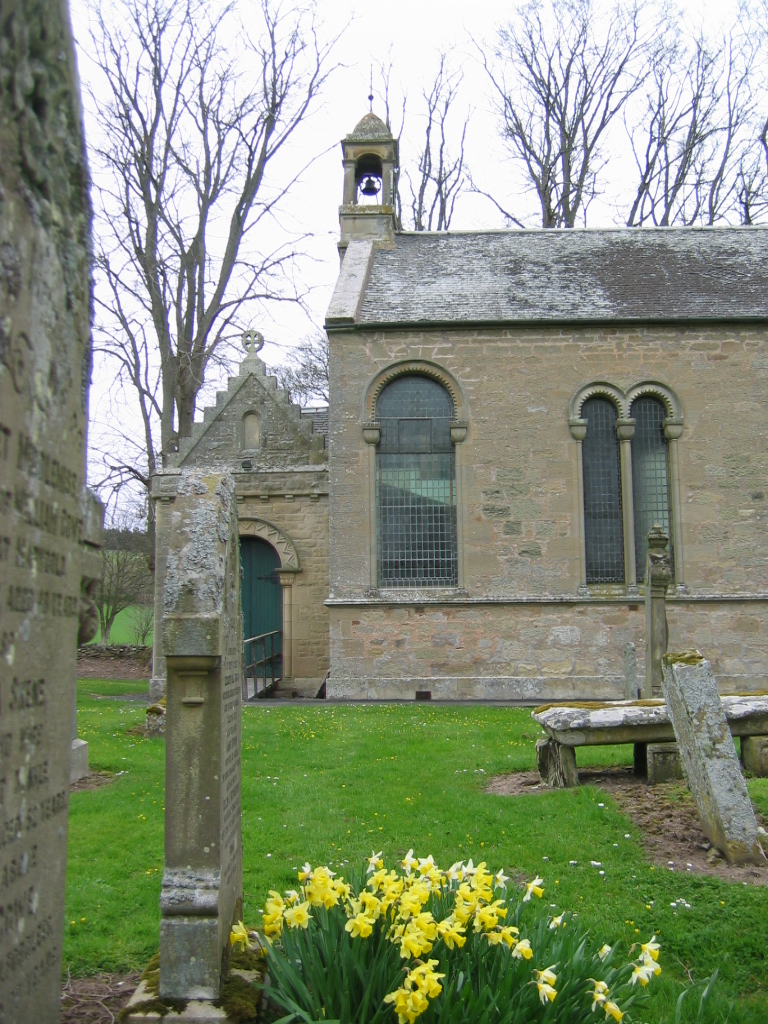

== See also ==
- Bonkyll Castle
- List of places in East Lothian
- List of places in Edinburgh
- List of places in Midlothian
- List of places in West Lothian
- List of places in Scotland
