= Blackadder House =

Castle in Berwickshire, Scotland

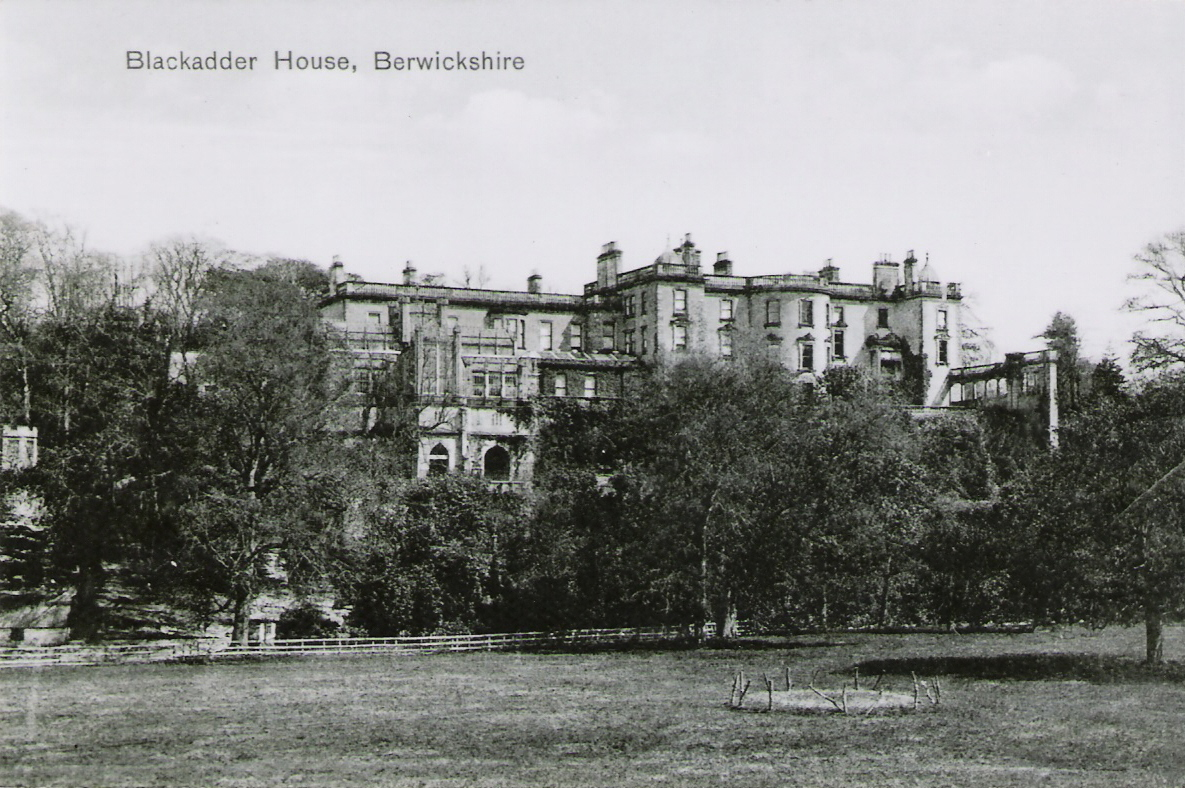
- Blackadder House

- Location in Scottish Borders
- 55.779601°N 2.230428°W

Blackadder House was an estate and stately house near the village of Allanton, in Berwickshire, Scotland. It was built on the site of the earlier Blackadder Castle. The house was vandalised by troops in World War I. Since there was no money to repair it, the house was demolished around 1925.

== Early history of the Blackadder Estate ==
The Blackadder family were an integral part of the constant Borders feuds, and extended their lands by grants from James II bestowed as a reward for repelling English raids, with great ferocity. During an invasion of Scotland in 1482, the Duke of Gloucester, later Richard III of England, came to Blackadder Castle, and his ally Alexander Stewart, Duke of Albany, ordered the "great house and tower of Blackadder" to be destroyed.

The Borders holdings of Blackadder of that ilk were taken into the family of Home (now the Home Robertson family) by the forced marriage of Beatrix and her younger sister, the only heirs of their father Robert, to younger sons of Home of Wedderburn in 1518. According to Anderson, this was achieved in the following manner: Andrew Blackadder followed the standard of Douglas at Flodden in 1513 and was slain along with two hundred gentlemen of that name on that disastrous field leaving a widow and two daughters, Beatrix and Margaret, who at the time were mere children. From the unprotected state of Robert’s daughters, the Homes of Wedderburn formed a design of seizing the lands of Blackadder. They began by cutting off all within their reach whose affinity was dreaded as an hereditary obstacle. They attacked Robert Blackadder, the Prior of Coldingham, and assassinated him. His brother, the Dean of Dunblane, shared the same fate. Various others were dispatched in like manner.

They now assaulted the Castle of Blackadder (which was sited somewhere on the land that is now Blackadder Mains and was destroyed in the early 16th century when the English, under the command of Surrey, invaded Scotland) where the widow and her two young daughters resided.

The garrison refused to surrender but the Homes succeeded in obtaining possession of the fortress, seized the widow and her children, compelling them to the marriage by force. In 1518, the two daughters were contracted to younger sons, John and Robert, and as they were only in their eighth year, they were confined in the Castle of Blackadder until they became of age. The Earl of Home was an ally of Margaret Tudor, and she came to Blackadder in September 1515 as she escaped to England from the regime of Regent Albany.

The Home possession of the estates was challenged by a cousin, Sir John Blackadder, who held the lands of Tulliallan. Sir John sought assistance from Parliament but, as was so often the case at that time, the matter was ultimately resolved by steel. Sir John Blackadder was beheaded in March 1531 for the murder of the Abbot of Culross in a land dispute. He was succeeded in the barony of Tulliallan by his brother Patrick, who again renewed his dispute against the Homes for the family lands. Patrick went to meet the Homes to try to resolves their differences, but he was ambushed and murdered near Edinburgh, which Anderson attributed to treachery by the Homes.

The Blackadders thereafter relinquished their claim to the Borders lands, and Sir John Home was created Baronet of Blackadder in 1671. The Homes retained possession of the castle until 1836, when it was acquired by the Houston family, later Houston-Boswalls. In 1857 the owner was listed as Sir George A. F. H. Boswell.

== Blackadder House ==
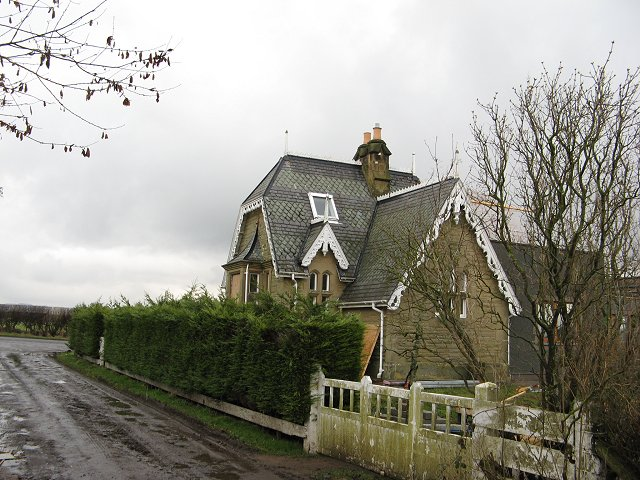
Blackadder North Lodge, undergoing restoration in 2007

The original peel tower was probably relatively unchanged until the mid eighteenth century. Around then James Playfair drew up plans for substantial rebuilding and remodelling of the earlier house, but these were not undertaken. Later, Robert Adam drew up plans which were carried out. In 1842 the house was described as an elegant modern edifice with extensive shrubberies and greenhouses and a beautiful Gothic conservatory.

An 1845 description highlighted the conservatory, which took the form of a Gothic chapel with a framework made entirely of cast iron, and with some of the glass panels stained. The conservatory had been erected by the late proprietor, Thomas Boswall, at a cost of several thousand pounds. An 1848 magazine article again mentioned the conservatory, which seems to have been the most notable feature of the house. The proprietor was given as Lady Houston.

In 1853 John Lessels extended the house, ballastrading the terraces and adding a large asymmetrical wing. The result was a magnificent classical house built in Palladian style. The house was described as "The Home of the Stately Home". It was probably the first in Berwickshire to have electric power. The original power house survives.

The gardens suffered badly from the severe frosts of the winter of 1879-1880, when the temperature was measured at −23 °F (−31 °C). Peach trees that had been planted by Lady Boswall's family fifty years earlier were killed to the roots, as were apricots and other fruit trees. An English Yew that had been planted the year Lady Boswall was born also died, as did many oaks. The frost killed Bay Laurels, Portugal Laurels, Rhododendrons, Hollies and other smaller trees.

During World War I the mansion was requisitioned by the government as accommodation for troops, who vandalised the building, using parts of the grand staircase bannisters for firewood. The post-war government refused to pay for the restitution of the house to its former state and with the agricultural depression it was closed up. It was demolished circa 1925.

== Today ==
Within Allanton's main street still stand a pair of splay-fronted lodges (Lydd Cottage and Westside Cottage), defining the entrance to the former Blackadder House. The farm of Blackadder Mains along with Blackadder Bank, Blackadder West and Blackadder Mount and the nearby village of Allanton were all originally part of the Blackadder Estate which surrounded Blackadder House.

While the house is gone, impressive ruins remain that make a walk through the estate worthwhile. Little remains of the house other than a folly walkway with stone balustrade which was at the back of the house below ground level, cut into the rock of a cliff face that overlooks the river Blackadder below. Where the house was, a wood was planted. Below the folly on the bank of the river the remains of the hydro electric power house is still visible (Blackadder House was reputedly the first in Berwickshire to have electric lighting).

Other buildings built to service the estate remain. Blackadder Cottage (or the 'Butler's House') with an impressive pair of lions on the parapet, sits on a high bank above the Blackadder Water. Allanbank Courtyard is a U-planned steading begun c. 1780. There is also a Walled Garden with a Summerhouse, and several bridges over the Blackadder Water. An impressive stable range with tower and obelisk steeple survive the destruction of the house, attributed to architect Alexander Boswell in 1785.

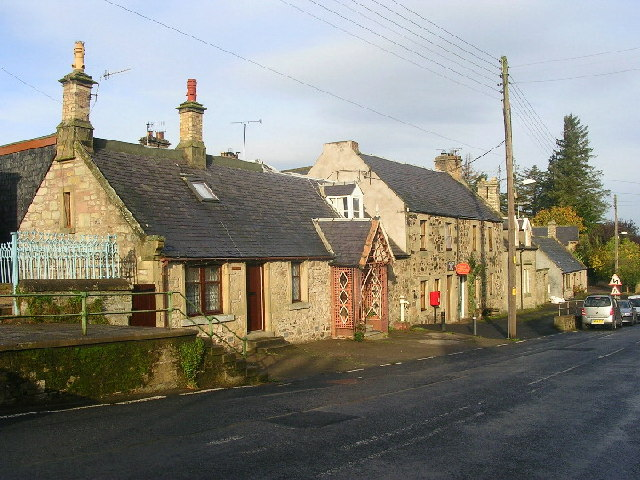
Main Street and Post Office at Allanton

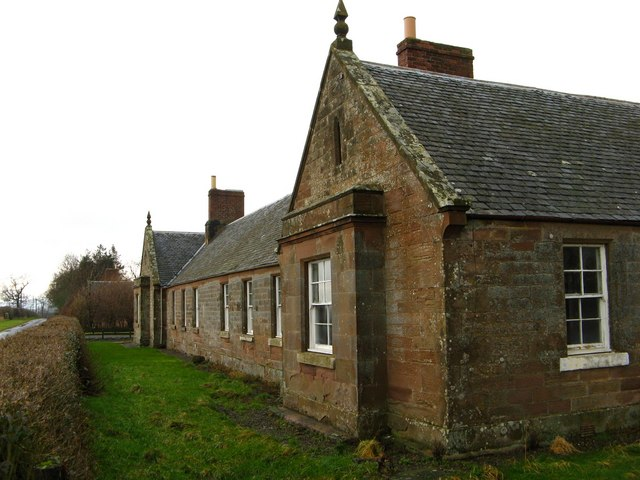
Farm cottages, Blackadder Mount

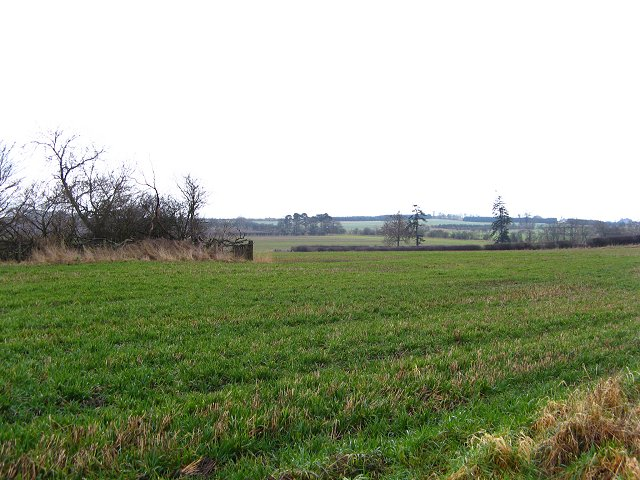
Blackadder Mount: stubble from previous year's barley

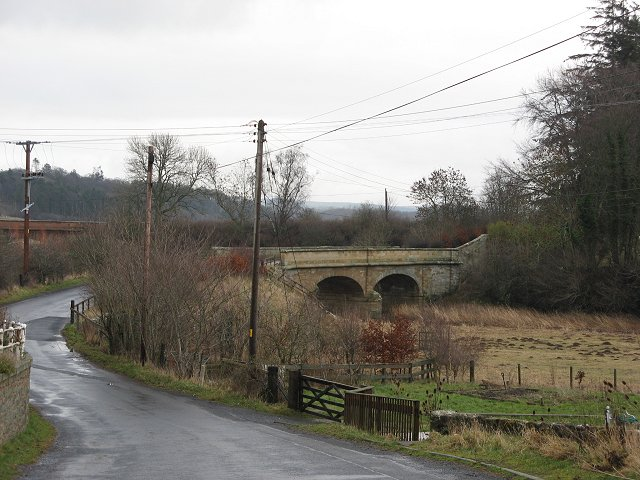
Blackadder bridge by Allanton

== Sources ==
- Cowan, Ian Borthwick (1967). The parishes of medieval Scotland. Edinburgh: Scottish Record Society.
- Dunse History Society. "Blackadder House". Archived from the original on 14 August 2013.
- Ewart, G (2008). "Allanbank House, Scottish Borders (Edrom parish), monitoring". Discovery and Excavation in Scotland. 9. Wiltshire, England: Cathedral Communications Limited: 157.
- Ferguson, J (1892). Notices of remains of pre-reformation churches, etc, in Berwickshire. Alnwick.
- Hall, Alan (1994). Border pubs and inns. Cicerone Press Limited. ISBN 1-85284-172-9.
- Society for the Benefit of the Sons and Daughters of the Clergy (1845). The New Statistical Account of Scotland: Linlithgow, Haddington Berwick. W. Blackwood and Sons.
- Strang, Charles Alexander (1994). Borders and Berwick:an illustrated architectural guide to the Scottish Borders and Tweed valley. Edinburgh: Rutland Press. p. 39. ISBN 1-873190-10-7.
- Stuart, Charles (1882). "The Effects of the Severe Cold of the Winter 1879-80, in Berwickshire". History of the Berwickshire Naturalists' Club, instituted September 22, 1831. Vol. 9. The Club.
- Sutherland and Knox (1857). NOBLEMEN AND GENTLEMEN'S SEATS, VILLAGES.
- Tait, William; Johnstone, Christian Isobel (1848). "Scottish Rivers". Tait's Edinburgh Magazine. 15. W. Tait.
- The Topographical, Statistical, and Historical Gazetteer of Scotland: A-H. Vol. 1. A. Fullarton. 1842.
