= Chirnsidebridge =

Village in Scottish Borders, Scotland

Coordinates: 55.8016°N 2.2387°W

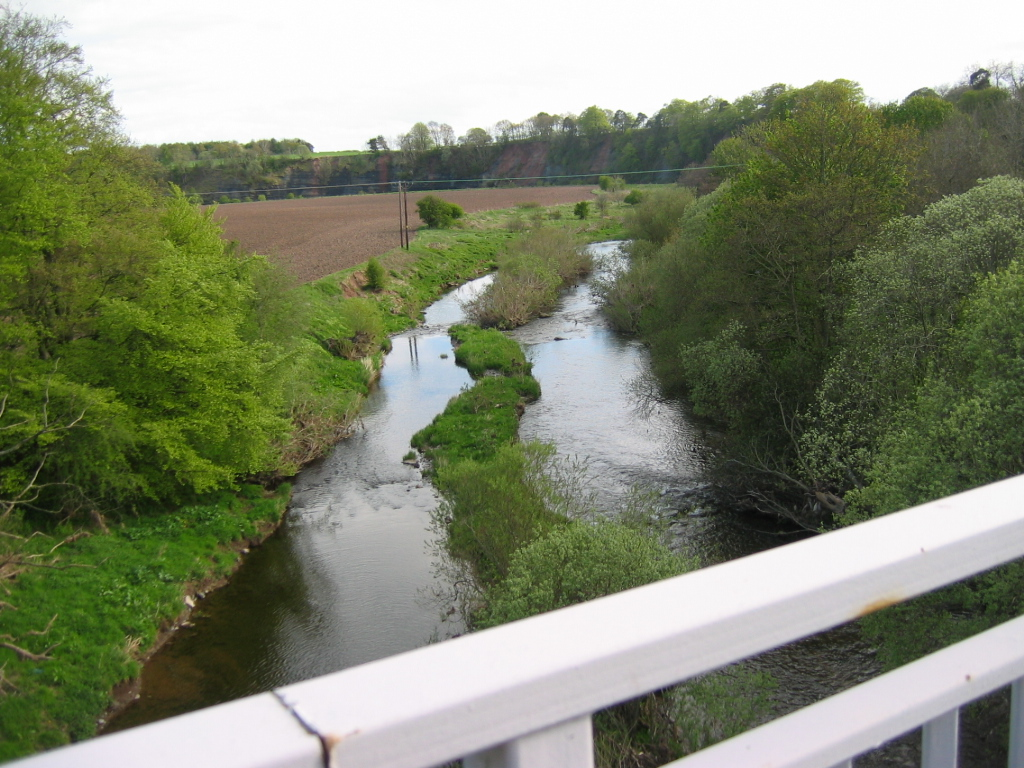
Chirnside Bridge over the River Whiteadder

Chirnsidebridge is a village near Chirnside in the Scottish Borders area of Scotland, at a bridge over the Whiteadder Water on its journey towards the River Tweed.

The bridge is a three-span rubble bridge with the two main spans segmental-arched.

As the place name varies between Chirnsidebridge and Chirnside Bridge, the paper mill has alternative names: Chirnside Paper Mill and Broomhouse Paper Mill.

== See also ==
- List of places in the Scottish Borders
- List of places in Scotland
