= Paxton, Scottish Borders =

Village in Scottish Borders, Scotland

Coordinates: 55.770°N 2.105°W

Paxton
- Location within the Scottish Borders
- OS grid reference: NT9353
- Council area: Scottish Borders
- Lieutenancy area: Berwickshire
- Country: Scotland
- Sovereign state: United Kingdom
- Post town: Berwick-upon-Tweed
- Postcode district: TD15
- Dialling code: 01289
- Police: Scotland
- Fire: Scottish
- Ambulance: Scottish
- UK Parliament: Berwickshire, Roxburgh and Selkirk
- Scottish Parliament: Ettrick, Roxburgh and Berwickshire

Paxton is a small village near the B6461 and the B6460, in the pre-1975 ancient county of Berwickshire, now an administrative area of the Borders region of Scotland. It lies one mile west of the border with Northumberland. It is a traditional, country village surrounded by farmland, and its closest market towns are Duns and Berwick-upon-Tweed.

Paxton is beside the River Tweed which is the border at that point and on Whiteadder Water. Paxton is also the location of Paxton House.

Linking Scotland and England, the nearby Union Chain Bridge, opened in 1820, was the longest wrought iron suspension bridge in the world. It was also the first of its kind in Britain.

== History ==
Traditionally home to villagers working on the land or in the salmon fishery on the Tweed, Paxton is said to be the birthplace of the song Robin Adair:

Paxton's a fine snug place, Robin Adair,

It's a wondrous couthie place, Robin Adair;

Let Whiteadder rin a spate,

Or the wind blow at ony rate,

Yet I'll meet thee on the gait, Robin Adair.

The settlement at Paxton was burnt by an English army in November 1542.
