= Preston, Scottish Borders =

Village in Scottish Borders, Scotland

Coordinates: 55.8088°N 2.3348°W

Preston
- Location within the Scottish Borders
- OS grid reference: NT8255
- Council area: Scottish Borders
- Lieutenancy area: Berwickshire
- Country: Scotland
- Sovereign state: United Kingdom
- Post town: DUNS
- Postcode district: TD11
- Police: Scotland
- Fire: Scottish
- Ambulance: Scottish
- UK Parliament: Berwickshire, Roxburgh and Selkirk
- Scottish Parliament: Ettrick, Roxburgh and Berwickshire

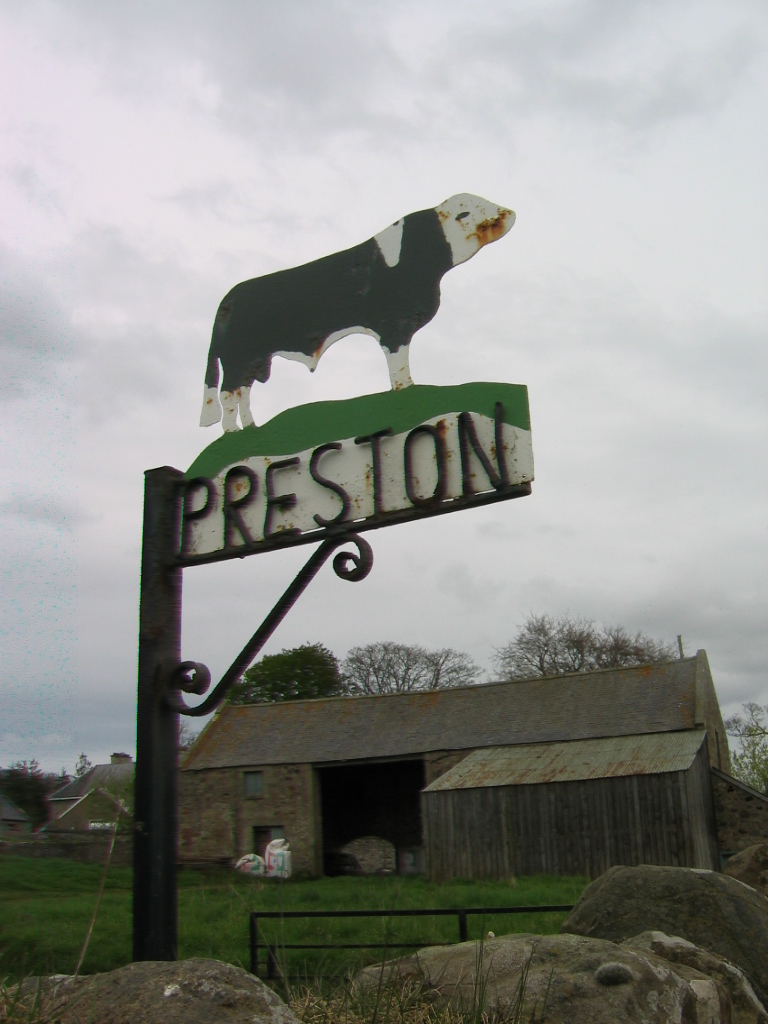
Preston Mains

Preston is a small village in the ancient county of Berwickshire, now an administrative area of the Scottish Borders region of Scotland. It lies within the local Abbey St Bathans, Bonkyl & Preston Community Council area.

The united Parishes of 'Bunkle' and Preston, situated at the foot of the Lammermuir Hills, are bordered on the north by the Parishes of Abbey St Bathans and Coldingham, on the east by the Parishes of Coldingham and Chirnside, on the south by the Parishes of Edrom and Duns and on the east by the Parishes of Duns and Abbey St. Bathans.

== Locality ==
Preston is on the A6112 road and the B6355, near Duns.

Places nearby include Bonkyl Kirk, Chirnside, Cranshaws, the Crosshall cross, Eccles, Edin's Hall Broch, Edrom, Greenlaw, Greenlaw County Hall, Gordon, Hume Castle, the Jim Clark Room, Manderston House, Polwarth Parish Church.

== The Village ==
The Old Parish Church was an outlying enclave of the diocese of Dunkeld, and a possession of its bishop in 1275. It was abandoned in 1718 in favour of Bunkle, and is now an overgrown ruin.

A Market Cross sits opposite Preston Farm, thought to be early 17th Century. It consists of a square plan shaft, and a broken cross.

Nel Logan's Bridge, 1793, is a single segmental-arch over Preston Burn. The arch was later enclosed to form a cell below the bridge, used as a jail. Local tradition claims Napoleonic prisoners of war were held here while in transit to larger sites. According to a local story it is named after Nel Logan, the last person to be imprisoned there, for the crime of stealing sheep. There is a hole in the floor directly above the Preston Burn, this was the 'toilet'. The heavy wooden arch-shaped door fell apart some forty years ago. The bridge is now a Category B Listed Building.

Preston Bridge, 1770, consists of three segmental arches which span the Whiteadder Water. Red sandstone, and notable for round recesses on the spandrels, with carved floral decorations in the south ones.

Bonkyl Lodge lies east of the village. A classical house built by the twelfth Earl of Home circa 1890, with some later additions.

Preston Farm Cottages are a late 19th-century U-plan range of nine cottages. Notable are blind armorial shields in the gable heads and casements with diamond-paned glazing.

The Bastie Monument, early 19th century, consists of a square plinth and pedestal embossed with crosses and classical cornice, topped by a stylised urn. Erected by General James Home in honour of Antoine d'Arces, Seigneur de la Bastie, a warden of the Marches murdered by Clan Home near Langton in 1517.

== History ==
Bunkle Wood, the remains of which can still be seen on the Duns to Grantshouse road at White Gate, is said to be the site where William Wallace camped during his pursuit of Patrick Earl of Dunbar from Spott Wood to Norham.

Traditional:

Bunkle, Billie and Blanerne

Three castles strong as airn

Built when Davy was a bairn;

They'll a' gang doon

Wi' Scotland's croon,

And ilke ane sall be a cairn.

All three castles are in this parish, and all three were destroyed during Hertford's Raid of 1544, part of The Rough Wooing of Scotland.

The old moat of Bunkle castle can still be traced, 2.5 km to the north of Preston, but no sign remains of the village.

== See also ==
- List of places in the Scottish Borders
- List of places in Scotland
