= Black adder =

Black adder may refer to either of two classifications of snake:

- Vipera berus, a viper species found in Europe and Asia
- Eastern hognose snake, a basically non-venomous snake found in the United States

Or the British TV series:

- The Black Adder, first series of the sitcom Blackadder
  - "The Black Adder" (pilot episode), the unaired pilot episode of the series

== See also ==
- Blackadder (disambiguation)
