= Steven Doane =

Steven Doane (born December 10, 1950) is an American cellist, professor and recitalist.

Internationally acclaimed as a soloist, chamber musician, and master teacher, Steven Doane maintains an active performance schedule throughout the U.S and Europe. Starting cello at a young age, his principal teachers included Richard Kapuscinski, Bernard Greenhouse, Jane Cowan (in Edrom), and Janos Starker. A finalist in the 1974 International Tchaikovsky Competition, Doane originally entered on a dare from friends. From this point in his career, he went on to serve as principal cellist of the Milwaukee Symphony Orchestra (1976–77), and later the Rochester Philharmonic Orchestra (1981–83). He holds degrees from the Oberlin Conservatory of Music and Stony Brook University.

Steven Doane is currently cellist of the Los Angeles Piano Quartet and Professor of Cello at the Eastman School of Music in Rochester N.Y. where he has taught for the past 25 years.
