= Berwickshire =

Berwickshire Siorrachd Bhearaig
- Historic county
- Berwickshire shown within Scotland

- Flag of Berwickshire, registered in 2023
- Interactive map of Berwickshire
- Coordinates: 55°45′N 2°30′W
- Country: Scotland
- County town: Berwick (pre–1482); Greenlaw (1596–1661, 1696-1903); Duns (1661-1696,1903–1975)

Area
  - Total: 457 sq mi (1,184 km^{2})
- Ranked 20th of 34
- Chapman code: BEW

Berwickshire (/ˈbɛrɪkʃər, -ʃɪər/; Scottish Gaelic: Siorrachd Bhearaig) is an historic county, registration county and lieutenancy area in south-eastern Scotland, on the English border. The county takes its name from Berwick-upon-Tweed, its original county town, which was part of Scotland at the time of the county's formation in the twelfth century, but became part of England in 1482 after several centuries of swapping back and forth between the two kingdoms. After the loss of Berwick, Duns and Greenlaw both served as county town at different periods.

Berwickshire County Council existed from 1890 until 1975, when the area became part of the Borders region, with most of the historic county becoming part of the lower-tier Berwickshire district. Berwickshire district was abolished in 1996, when all the districts in the Borders region merged to become the Scottish Borders council area.

The low-lying part of Berwickshire between the Tweed and the Lammermuirs is known as "the Merse", from an old Scots word for a floodplain, and this name is sometimes extended to the county as a whole. Inhabitants are called "Merse-men". Berwickshire bordered Midlothian to the west, East Lothian to the north, the North Sea to the east, and Roxburghshire and the English county of Northumberland to the south.

== Geography ==
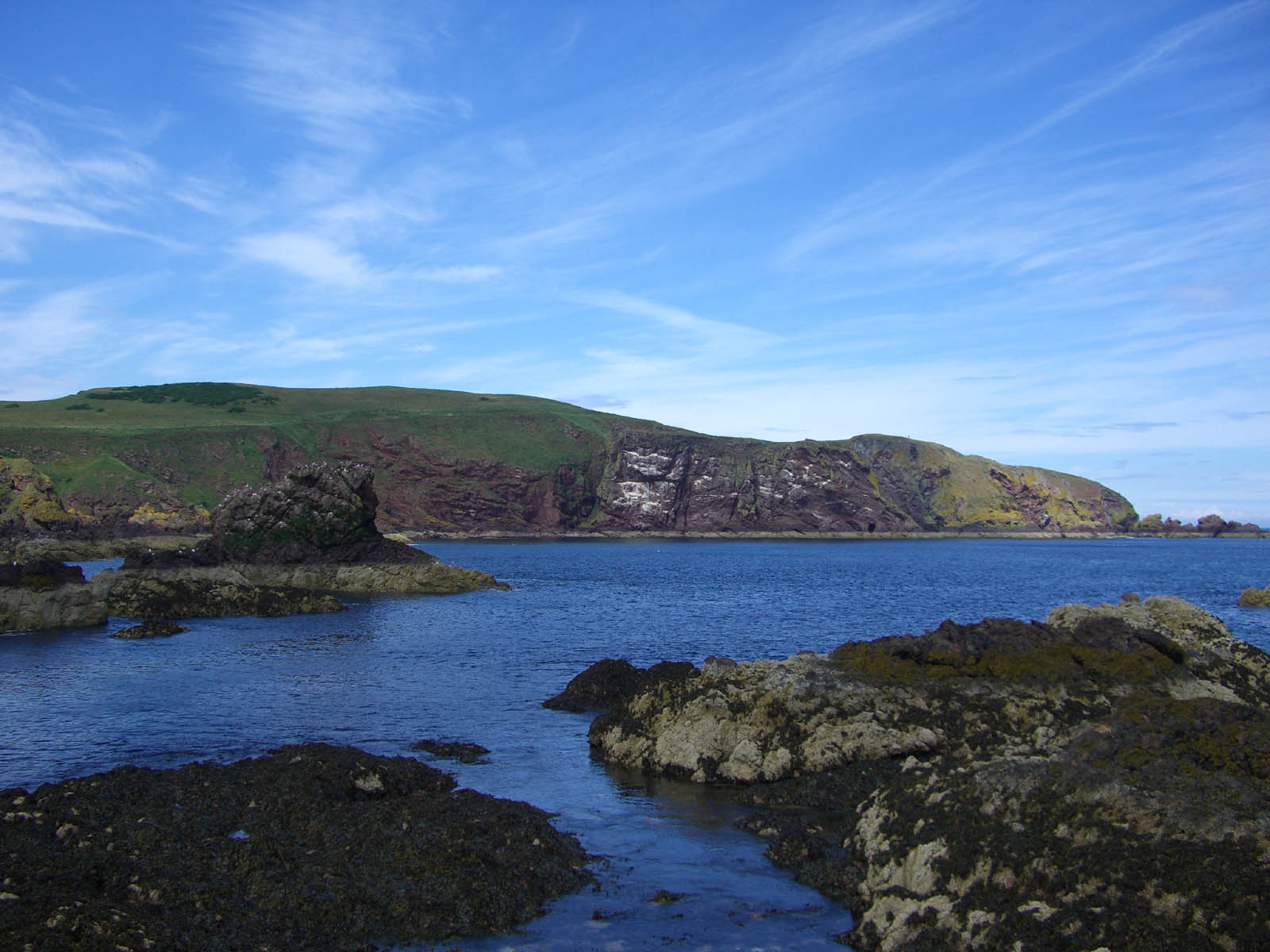
St Abb's Head on the Berwickshire coast

Berwickshire has low hills and agricultural land, with a number of small towns scattered throughout the county. The Lammermuir Hills traverse the border with East Lothian, including Meikle Says Law, the highest point in the county at 535 m (1,755 ft). The River Tweed forms the border with England to the south, with the exception of a small section near Berwick-upon-Tweed (formerly the river formed the whole border out to the North Sea); other major rivers include the Eye Water, Whiteadder Water, Dye Water, Watch Water, Eden Water and Blackadder Water.

== History ==
Between the late tenth and early eleventh centuries, the land between the rivers Forth and Tweed came under Scottish control. The town of Berwick-upon-Tweed was made a royal burgh by David I (reigned 1124–1153), and it would appear that the shire of Berwick, or Berwickshire, was also created during David's reign. The shire covered the town of Berwick plus a largely rural area to the north-west of it, and corresponded to the medieval province of Merse.

After the town of Berwick had finally been ceded to English control in 1482, the functions of the county town (principally holding the sheriff court) were initially shared between Duns and Lauder, until 1596 when Greenlaw was declared the county town by James VI. In 1661 the county town was moved to Duns, but in 1696 it was moved back to Greenlaw.

Berwickshire Courts Act 1853 (Note: The citation of this act by this short title was authorised by section 1 of, and the first schedule to, the Short Titles Act 1896. Due to the repeal of those provisions it is now authorised by section 19(2) of the Interpretation Act 1978.)
- Act of Parliament
- Parliament of the United Kingdom
- Long title: An Act for empowering the Sheriff and Commissary of Berwickshire to hold Courts at Dunse, and for other Purposes.
- Citation: 16 & 17 Vict. c. 27
- Territorial extent: United Kingdom

Dates
- Royal assent: 14 June 1853
- Commencement: 14 June 1853 (Note: The Acts of Parliament (Commencement) Act 1793.)
- Repealed: 30 June 1903
Other legislation
Repealed by	Berwickshire County Town Act 1903

Status: Repealed

Text of statute as originally enacted

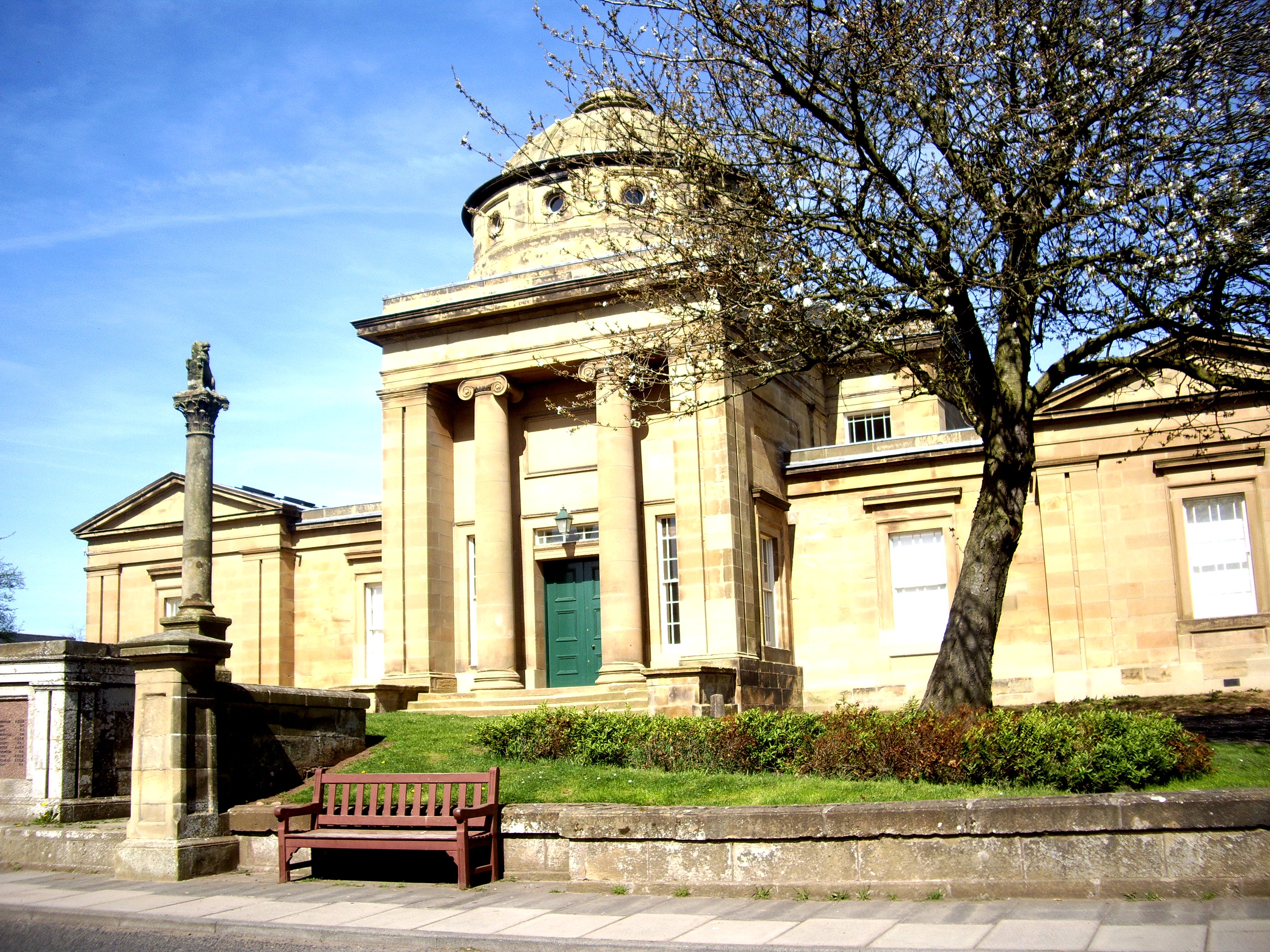
Town Hall, Greenlaw: Built 1829 as County Hall.

Commissioners of Supply were established for each Scottish shire in 1667. County Hall was built at Greenlaw in 1829 to serve as the courthouse and meeting place for the commissioners, replacing an earlier building on an adjoining site. The building was paid for by William Purves-Hume-Campbell of Purves Hall, near Greenlaw, who was keen for Greenlaw to retain its position as county town. However, Greenlaw remained a very small town, and Duns was clearly the larger town by the nineteenth century. In 1853 an act of Parliament, the Berwickshire Courts Act 1853 (16 & 17 Vict. c. 27) was passed allowing the courts and commissioners' meetings to be held at Duns as well as at Greenlaw. Another courthouse, known as County Buildings, was subsequently built at 8 Newtown Street in Duns in 1856.

== County council ==
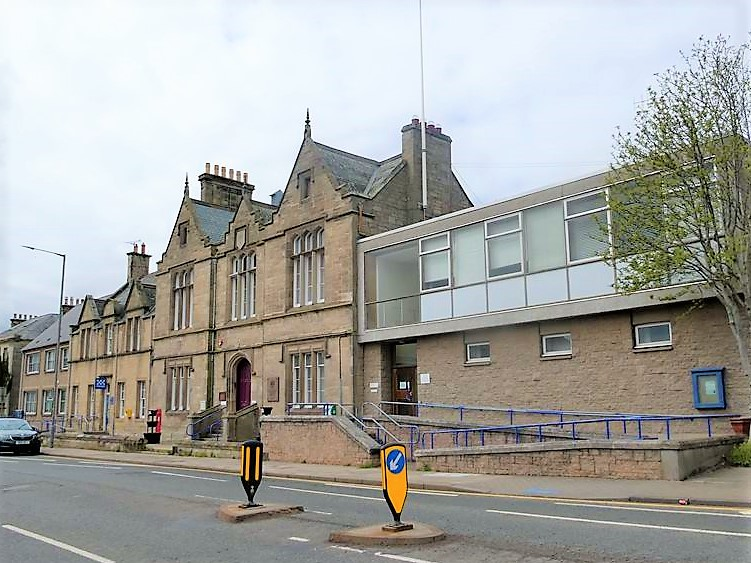
County Buildings, 8 Newtown Street, Duns

Elected county councils were established in 1890 under the Local Government (Scotland) Act 1889, taking over most of the functions of the commissioners. Berwickshire County Council held its first meeting on 22 May 1890 at County Hall in Greenlaw, when it decided by 18 votes to 12 that all subsequent meetings should be held at Duns. The county council therefore based itself at the County Buildings in Duns, sharing the premises with its continuing use as a sheriff court. The county council subsequently established additional offices in various converted houses along Newtown Street. A modern extension was added to County Buildings in 1967.

Greenlaw was still considered the official county town after 1890, despite the county council meeting in Duns and courts being held at both towns. An Act of Parliament in 1903 finally revoked Greenlaw's status as county town and declared Duns to be the county town for all purposes.

At the time of the county council's abolition in 1975, Berwickshire contained four burghs and three districts:

- Coldstream Burgh
- Duns Burgh
- East District
- Eyemouth Burgh
- Lauder Royal Burgh
- Middle District
- West District

== District Council ==
Berwickshire
- District (1975–1996); Lieutenancy area (1975–)
- History
  - Created: 16 May 1975
  - Abolished: 31 March 1996
  - Succeeded by: Scottish Borders
  - HQ: Duns
- Contained within
  - Region: Borders

Berwickshire County Council was abolished in 1975 under the Local Government (Scotland) Act 1973, which reorganised local government across Scotland into upper-tier regions and lower-tier districts. Berwickshire was incorporated into the Borders Region. Borders was divided into four districts, one of which was named Berwickshire, with borders which broadly resembled those of the historic county, but excluded the parish of Nenthorn, which went to Roxburgh district, and the parishes of Channelkirk, Earlston, Lauder, Legerwood, and Mertoun, which went to Ettrick and Lauderdale district. The Berwickshire lieutenancy area was adjusted from being the historic county to being the new district at the same time.

Berwickshire District Council was based at the former County Buildings at 8 Newtown Street in Duns, which became known as the Council Offices.

The Borders region and its four district councils, including Berwickshire, were abolished in 1996, merging to form the present Scottish Borders council area. The Berwickshire lieutenancy area continues to be defined as the area of the pre-1996 district rather than the pre-1975 county. The former council offices in Duns continue to be used for some departments of Scottish Borders Council.

=== Political control ===
The first election to Berwickshire District Council was held in 1974, initially operating as a shadow authority alongside the outgoing authorities until it came into its powers on 16 May 1975. Throughout the council's existence a majority of the seats on the council were held by Conservatives:

Party in control	Years
Conservative	1975–1996

== Coat of arms ==
Coat of arms of Berwickshire

The county council of Berwickshire was formed in 1890 by the Local Government (Scotland) Act 1889, and applied for a grant of arms from the Lord Lyon the same year. The grant was made on 10 October.

The coat of arms, which closely resembles the arms of Berwick-upon-Tweed, shows a bear chained to a wych tree, forming a pun on the name. Upon the abolition of Berwickshire County Council, the arms were regranted to Berwickshire District Council.

== Civil parishes ==
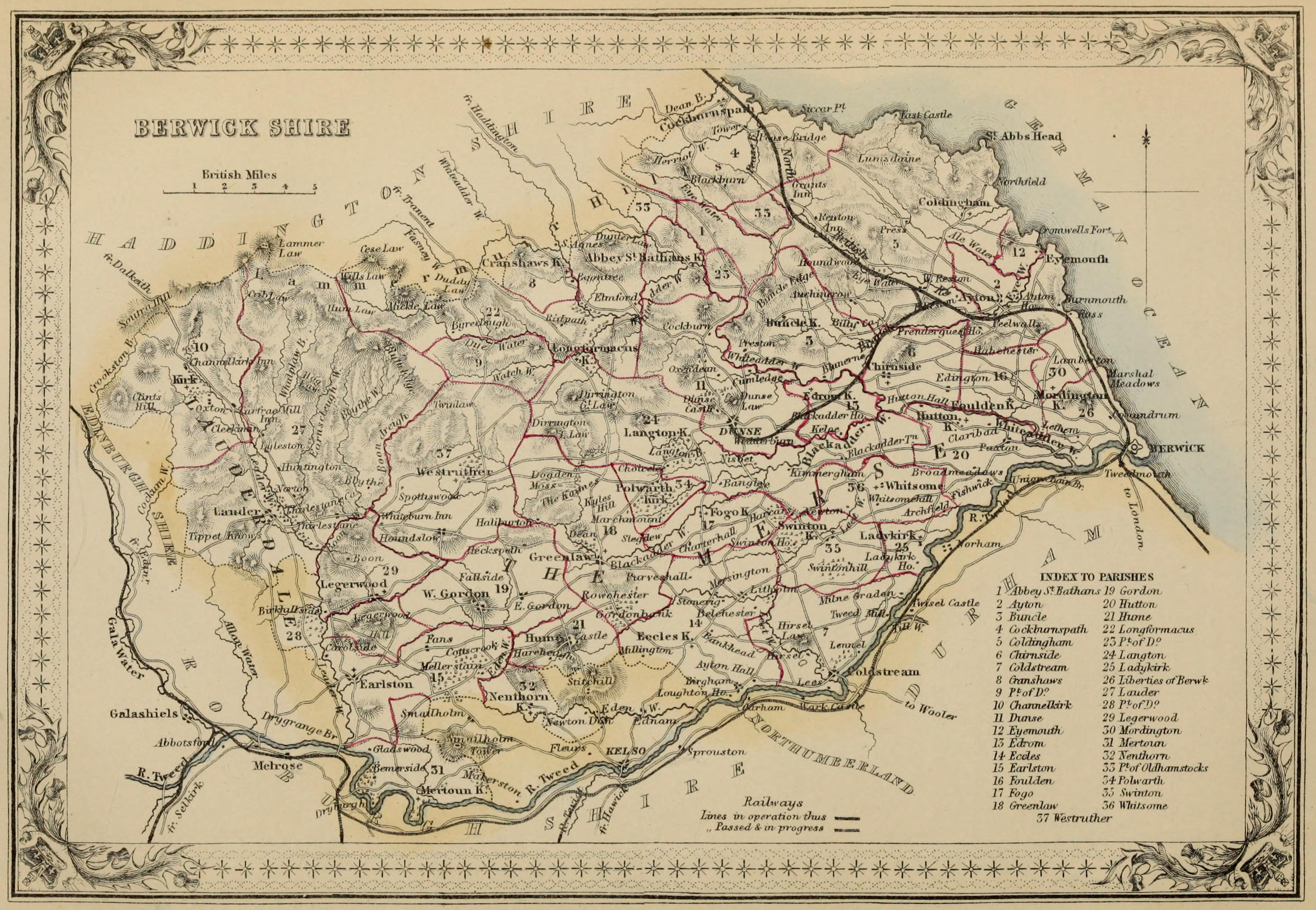
Berwickshire in 1854, with an index to the parishes

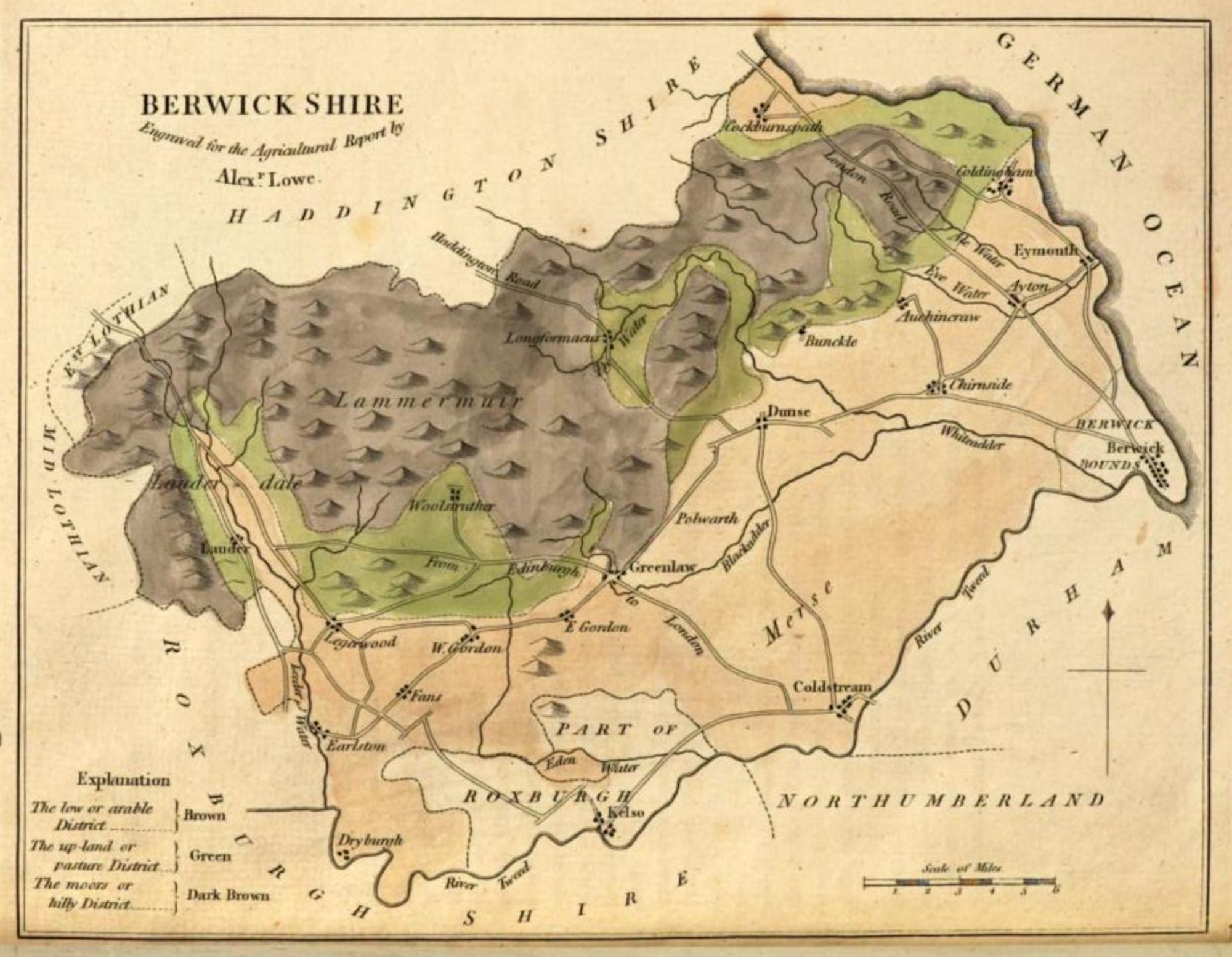
Agricultural map of Berwickshire (1794)

- Abbey St Bathans
- Ayton
- Buncle (Bonkyl)
- Cockburnspath
- Coldingham
- Chirnside
- Coldstream
- Cranshaws
- Channelkirk
- Duns
- Eyemouth
- Edrom
- Eccles
- Earlston
- Foulden
- Fogo
- Greenlaw
- Gordon
- Hutton
- Hume
- Longformacus
- Langton
- Ladykirk
- Liberties of Berwick
- Lauder (former seat of the county Commissariat)
- Legerwood
- Mordington
- Mertoun
- Nenthorn
- Part of Oldhamstocks, since 1891 in East Lothian
- Polwarth
- Swinton
- Whitsome
- Westruther

== Settlements ==
- Abbey St Bathans
- Allanton
- Auchencrow
- Ayton
- Birgham
- Burnmouth
- Chirnside
- Clappers
- Clintmains
- Cockburnspath
- Coldingham
- Coldstream
- Cove
- Cranshaws
- Dryburgh
- Duns
- Earlston
- Eccles
- Edrom
- Eyemouth
- Fogo
- Foulden
- Gavinton
- Gordon
- Grantshouse
- Greenlaw
- Horndean
- Houndwood
- Hume
- Hutton
- Ladykirk
- Lamberton
- Lauder
- Legerwood
- Leitholm
- Lennel
- Longformacus
- Nenthorn
- Oxton
- Paxton
- Polwarth
- Preston
- Redpath
- Reston
- St Abbs
- Swinton
- Westruther
- Whitsome
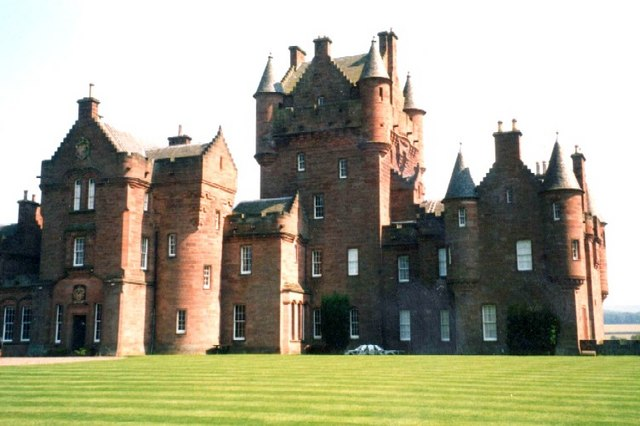
Ayton Castle

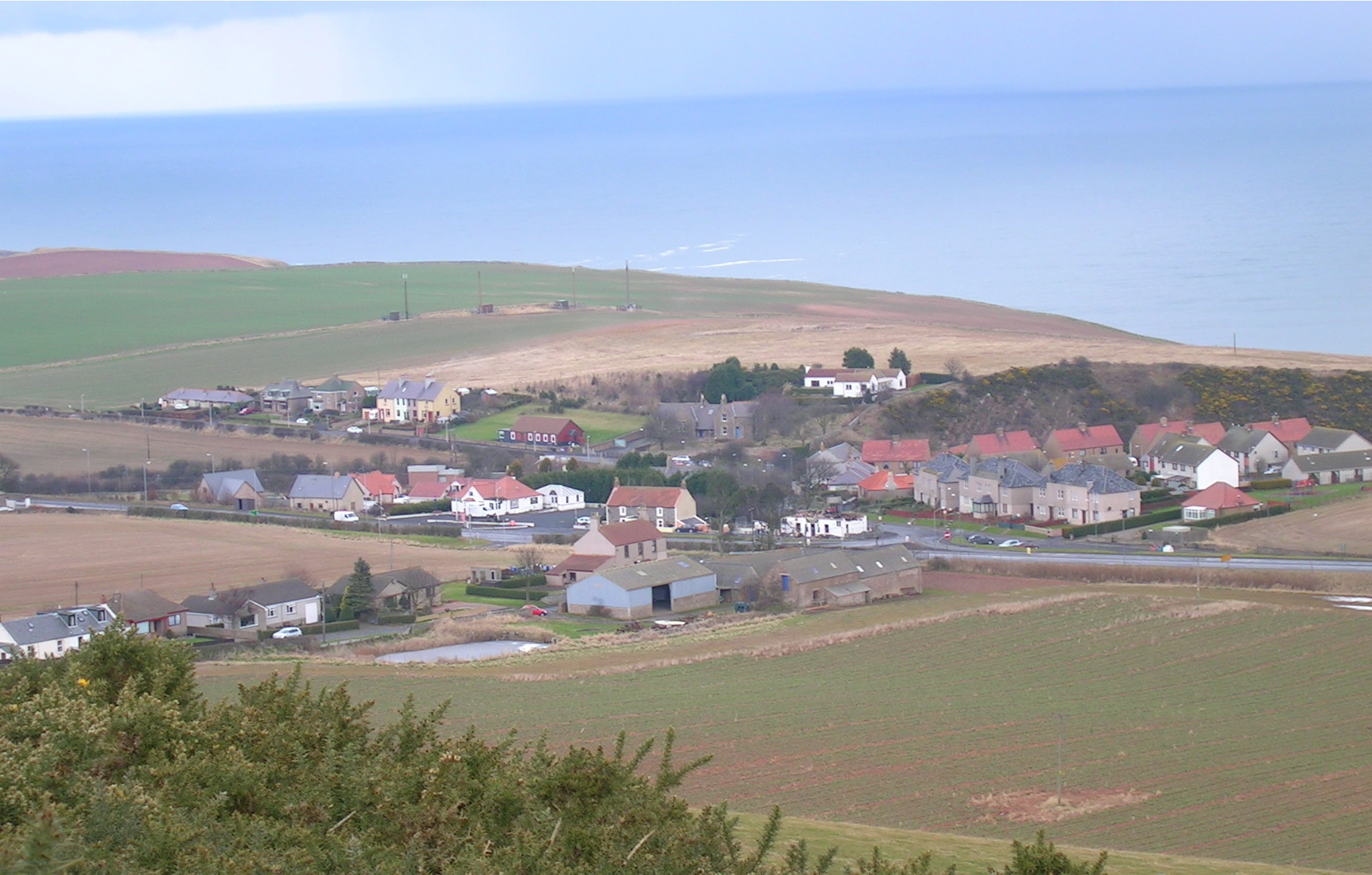
Burnmouth

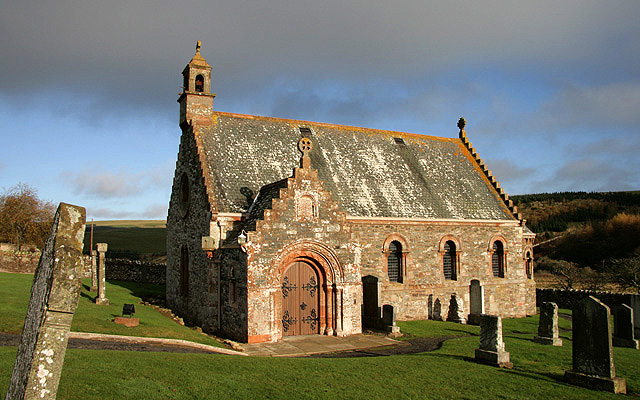
Cranshaws

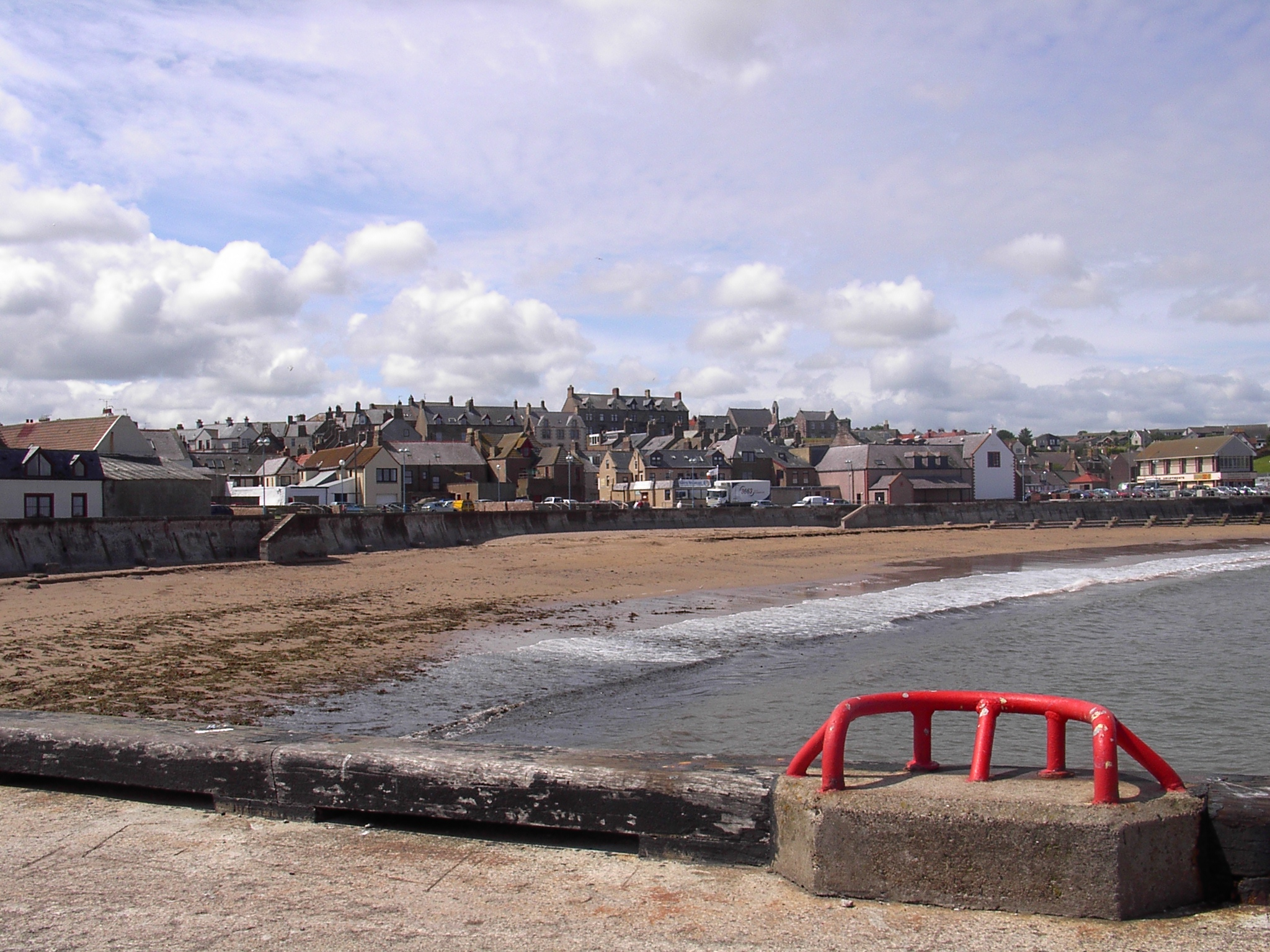
Eyemouth

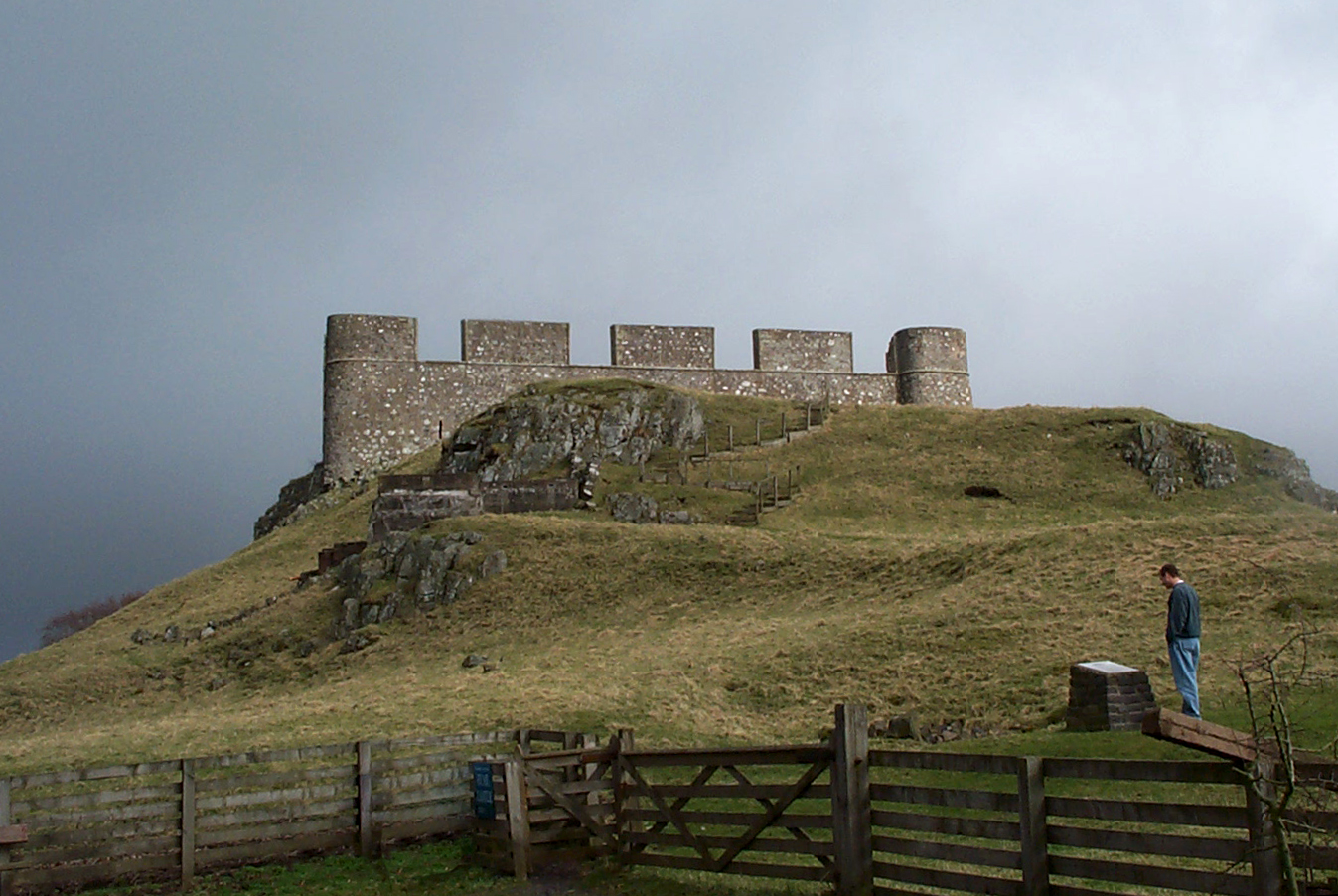
Hume Castle

== Transport ==
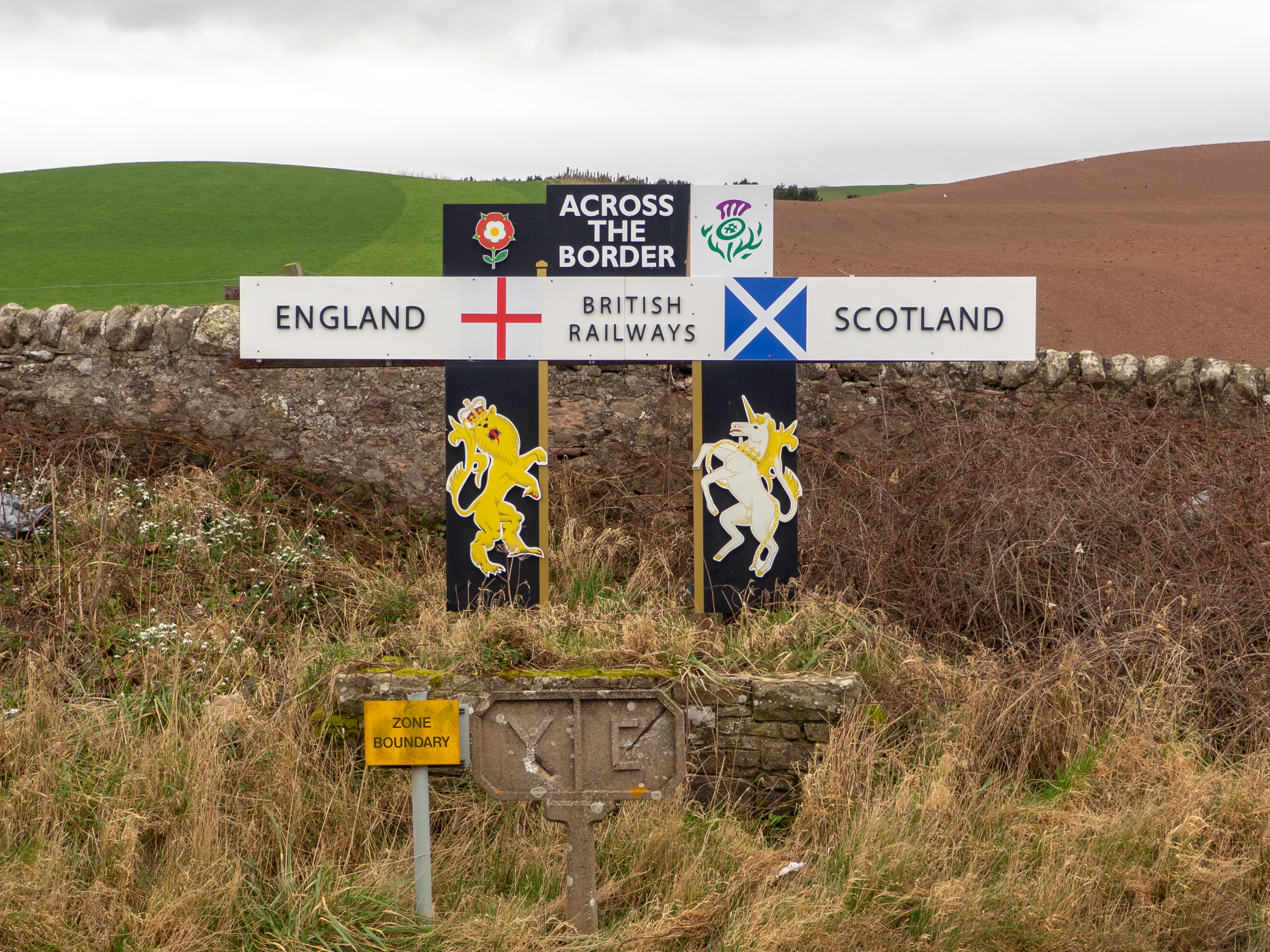
The East Coast Main Line as it crosses the border

The East Coast Main Line railway line passes through the county, running roughly parallel with the coast. From the railway's opening in 1846 there were a number of small stations within Berwickshire, but they were all closed by 1964. A rebuilt Reston railway station opened on this stretch of line in 2022, being the only railway station within the historic county (apart from Berwick-upon-Tweed railway station which lies within the area ceded from Berwickshire to England in 1482). The Berwickshire Railway formerly serviced the county, however this closed following damage caused by a violent storm in 1948. The nearest open stations are in Dunbar and Berwick-upon-Tweed.

The A1 road runs roughly parallel to the railway and provides access to Edinburgh in the north and to the south Berwick-upon-Tweed, continuing on to Newcastle. The A68 and A697 serve the towns of western Berwickshire.

== Legacy ==
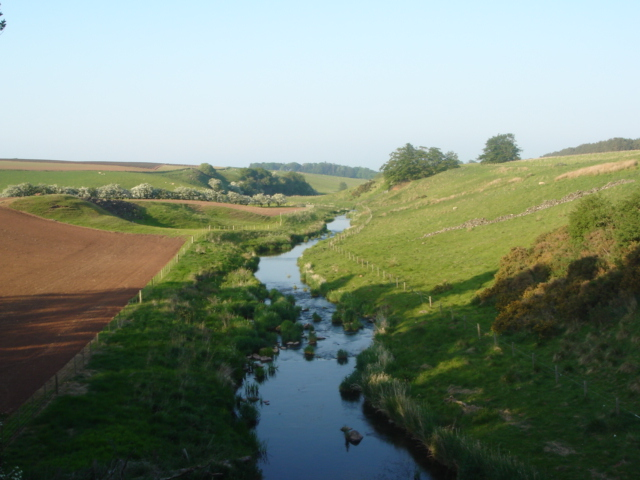
Typical Berwickshire scenery near Greenlaw

The Berwickshire News is published weekly, and numerous organisations and groups have Berwickshire in their titles (i.e.: the Berwickshire Housing Association, Berwickshire Sports Council).

The Berwickshire Civic Society is campaigned for road signs at the entrances to the county to have notices added saying "You are now entering the ancient county of Berwickshire", and they hold an annual Keep Berwickshire Tidy Campaign, judged each April.

The high school west of Duns is named Berwickshire High School, and has been open since 1896. Together with Eyemouth High School they run a rugby team under the name of Berwickshire schools.

The Berwickshire Coastal Path runs from Cockburnspath to Berwick-upon-Tweed (28 miles; 45 km).

== See also ==
- List of places in the Scottish Borders
- Subdivisions of Scotland
