= Blackadder (surname) =

Blackadder is a surname. Notable people and fictional characters with this surname include:

== People ==
- Agnes Forbes Blackadder (1875–1964), Scottish medic
- Charles Blackader (1869–1921), British general in the First World War
- Elizabeth Blackadder (1931–2021), Scottish painter
- John Blackadder (preacher) (ca. 1622–1685) Scottish Presbyterian Covenanter preacher
- John Blackadder (soldier) (1664–1729), Scottish soldier
- Robert Blackadder (d. 1508), medieval Scottish cleric, diplomat and politician
- Todd Blackadder (born 1971), New Zealand rugby player

== Fictional characters ==
- Edmund Blackadder, various related characters on Blackadder
- Vivian Blackadder, on JAG
