= Dye Water =

River in Scottish Borders, Scotland

Coordinates: 55.82737°N 2.45682°W

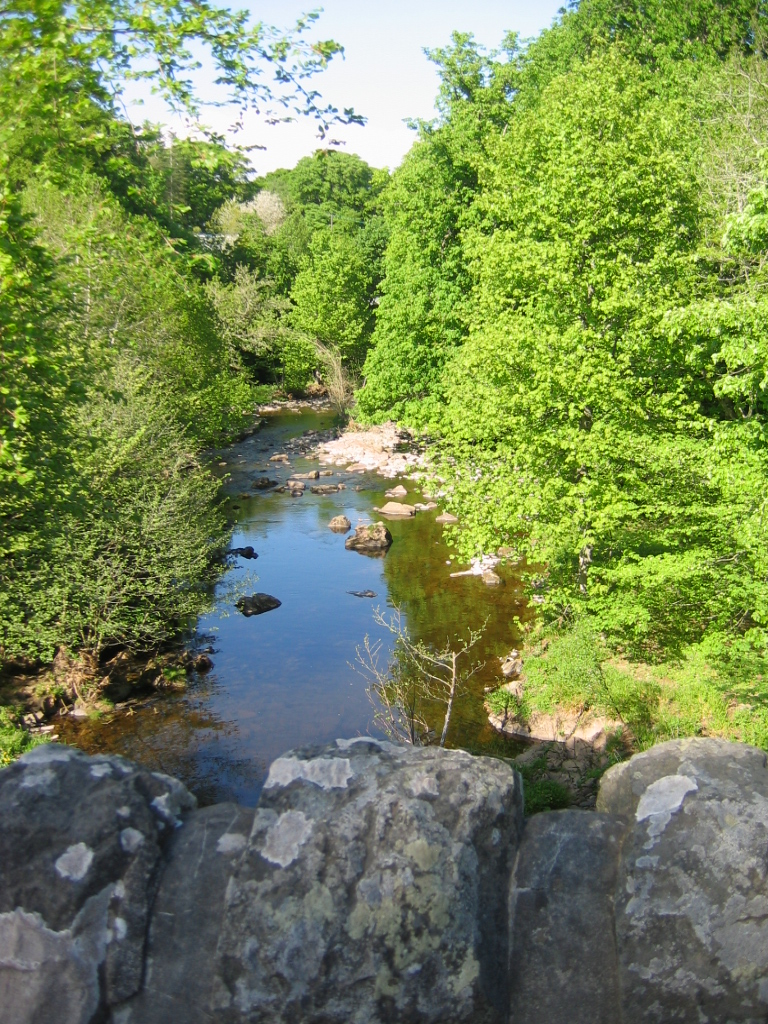
The Dye Water at Longformacus

The Dye Water (Scottish Gaelic: Uisge Dhàidh) is a river in the Lammermuir Hills in the Scottish Borders area of Scotland. It rises in the Hope Hills, continues along the East Lothian boundary, a mile north east of Seenes Law, then east to Longformacus. The Dye Water joins the Whiteadder Water and completes its 12.5 mile journey.

The Sir Walter Scott Way and the Southern Upland Way long distance footpaths also pass through Longformacus.

== See also ==
- List of places in the Scottish Borders
- List of places in Scotland
