= Liberties of Berwick =

Coordinates: 55°47′N 2°02′W

The Liberties of Berwick are coterminous with the parish of Holy Trinity and St. Mary. They comprise the town of Berwick-upon-Tweed and a rural area to the north and west. For several centuries the Bounds of the liberties have been ridden on horseback each year on May Day.

The liberties and Berwick parish do not encompass the suburbs of Berwick on the south bank of the Tweed, which are contained in the separate parishes of Spittal and Tweedmouth. The population in 2011 was 4.500.

After Scotland acquired the area in 1020, Berwick became the chief town of the country between Northumberland and the Firth of Forth and grew into a great seaport, becoming one of the four major royal burghs of Scotland. Coveted by England, it was seized during the disputed succession to the Scottish throne after the demise of Alexander III and was thenceforth the object of jealousy and subject to various seizures and negotiated transfers. The Liberties of Berwick were relinquished by Scotland in 1482 and by the Redistribution of Seats Act 1885 became part of the county of Northumberland.
