= Whiteadder Water =

River in southeast Scotland and Northumberland, England

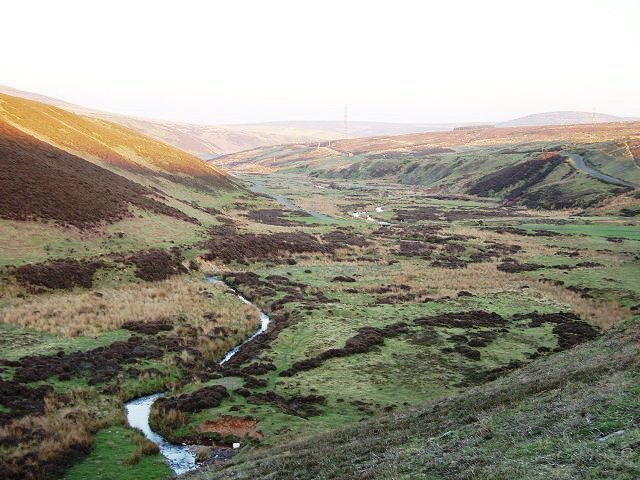
- The headwaters of the Whiteadder (May 2006)

- Location of the confluence in Scotland

Location
- Country: England and Scotland, UK
- Region: East Lothian, Berwickshire and Northumberland

Physical characteristics
- Mouth: Confluence with the River Tweed
  - coordinates: 55.759731°N 2.044910°W

Basin features
- Grid reference: NT645655

Whiteadder Water /ˈhwʌtədər/ is a river in East Lothian and Berwickshire, Scotland. It also flows for a very short distance through Northumberland before joining the River Tweed. In common with the headwaters of the Biel Water it rises on the low hillside of Clints Dod (122 m or 400 ft) in the Lammermuir Hills, just ESE of Whitecastle Hillfort and 3 km (1.9 mi) south-east of the village of Garvald.

== Etymology ==
Adder may be derived from Brittonic *ador, *edir or Old English edre, possible ancient hydronymic terms derived from an Indo-European formation meaning "a watercourse, a channel" (compare River Etherow). The possibility of the name deriving from Old English ǣdre, "a vein" (Anglian ēdre), or *ǣdre, meaning "quickly" is objected on the grounds that these would have maintained the long initial vowel in English and Scots.

Also suggested is derivation from Gaelic fad dûr, meaning "long water". though the Gaelic was never spoken in the Scottish southeast.

== Course ==
The stream wends its way south east for approximately 5 km (3.1 mi) where it joins with the Faseny Water to form the Whiteadder Reservoir created in 1968, which supplies most of the towns of East Lothian (including, before its closure, the Cockenzie power station) and Berwickshire, with water.

From there, crossing into Berwickshire it runs alongside the B6355 road to Ellemford where it joins the Dye Water and further on at Abbey St. Bathans, the Monynut Water.

By this point having become a much larger body of flow, the Whiteadder meanders across Eastern parts of the Merse passing the communities of Preston, Chirnside, Allanton. Here at Allanton the Whiteadder joins with its antonymic counterpart the Blackadder Water. The river proceeds by Foulden, Edrington, and Paxton, it crosses into England, before joining the River Tweed, just north of East Ord, a suburb of Berwick-upon-Tweed.

== History ==
In the 12th century, Melrose Abbey established granges for its sheep flocks at Penshiel, Hartside, Edmundston and Friardykes in the catchment of the Whiteadder, leading to disputes over grazing rights with the tenants of the Earl of Dunbar.

== Notability ==
=== Fishing ===
The Whiteadder provides recreational salmon and trout fishing. A number of angling clubs offer access to the river, including the Whiteadder Angling Association (trout) and Berwick and District Angling Association (salmon, sea trout and wild brown trout). The Whiteadder is the home of the oldest Angling Club in the world verified by the Guinness Book of Records, Ellem Angling Club, established in 1829. The regalia of the club is on display at Paxton House in Berwickshire. It is also the site of Ninewells, the childhood home of David Hume.

=== Natural heritage ===
The lowermost section of the Whiteadder is a Site of Special Scientific Interest (SSSI) by virtue of its water crowfoot, salmon, lamprey and moulting mute swan.

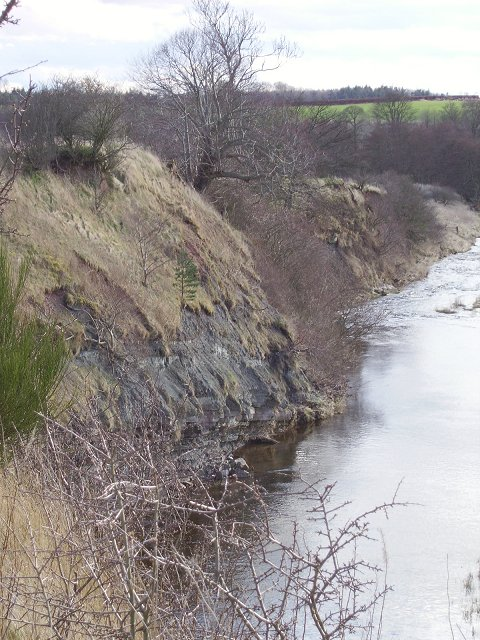
Shale crags along the Whiteadder (April 2006)

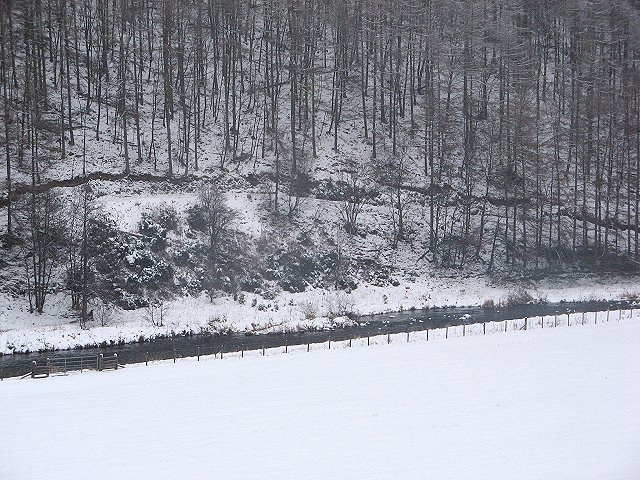
Whiteadder Water and Roughside Wood from the road into Greenburn (February 2007)

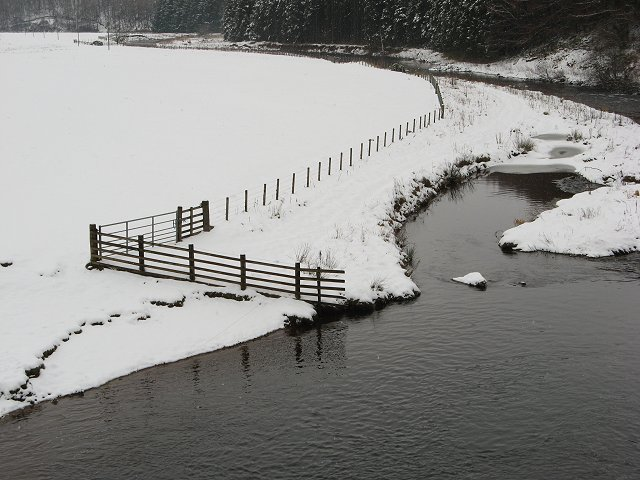
Whiteadder, downstream from Ellemford Bridge (February 2007)

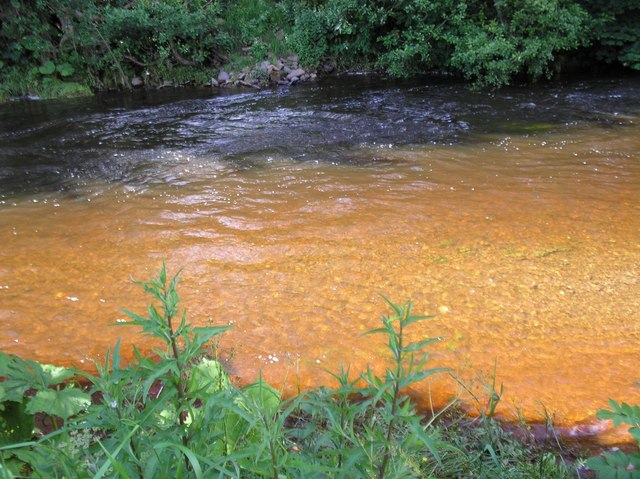
Whiteadder Water after heavy rainfall, depicting runoff from the peat in the Lammermuir Hills (July 2007)

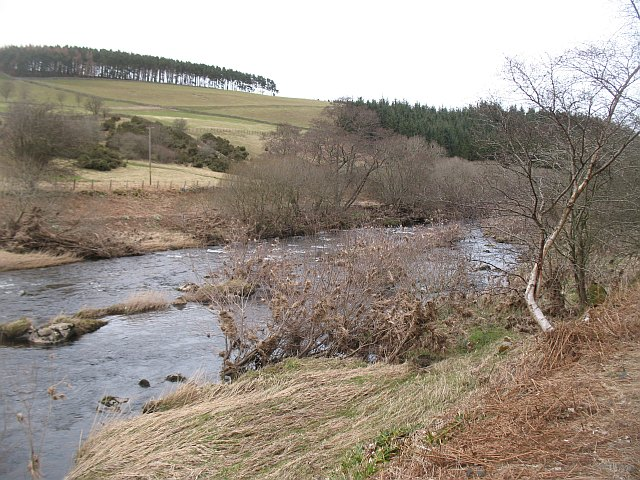
Whiteadder Water running around Abbey St Bathans (March 2010)

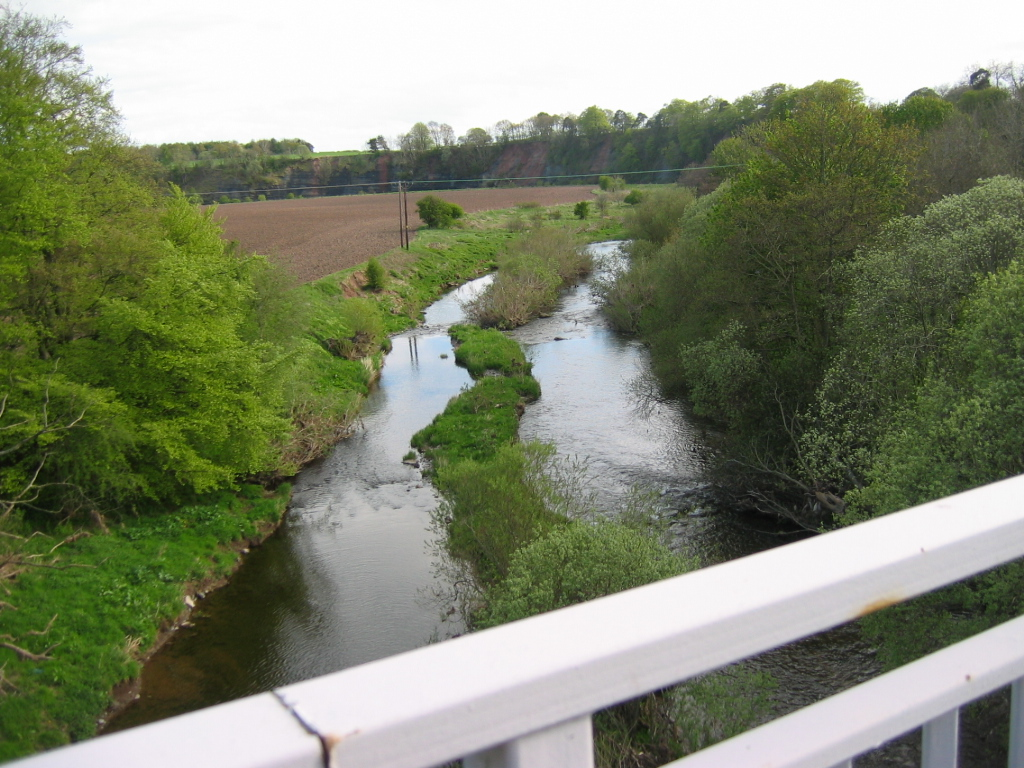
Chirnside Bridge over the Whiteadder (May 2010)

== See also ==
- Rivers of Scotland
- List of places in the Scottish Borders
