= Whitsome =

Village in Scottish Borders, Scotland

Coordinates: 55°44′56″N 2°13′03″W

- Location within the Scottish Borders
- OS grid reference: NT859504
  - Edinburgh: 40 mi (64 km)
  - London: 305 mi (491 km)
- Council area: Scottish Borders
- Lieutenancy area: Berwickshire
- Country: Scotland
- Sovereign state: United Kingdom
- Post town: DUNS
- Postcode district: TD11
- Police: Scotland
- Fire: Scottish
- Ambulance: Scottish
- UK Parliament: Berwickshire, Roxburgh and Selkirk
- Scottish Parliament: Ettrick, Roxburgh and Berwickshire

Whitsome is a small rural village in the Scottish Borders area of Scotland, on the B6437, near Duns, Fogo, Ladykirk, Leitholm and Swinton.

== Place-name meaning ==
Whitsome derives from Old English hwit-husum "at the white houses". This may refer to white stone buildings, or houses painted white. The name has been recorded as the following over the centuries:

- æt hwitum husum, 984 (literally "at the white houses, -um being dative plural).
- Huuithusum, 1038 (double u was written since "w" could not be pronounced by the author)
- Witsum, 1124 (contracted form)

== See also ==
- List of places in the Scottish Borders
- List of places in Scotland
