= Blackadder Water =

River in Berwickshire, Scotland

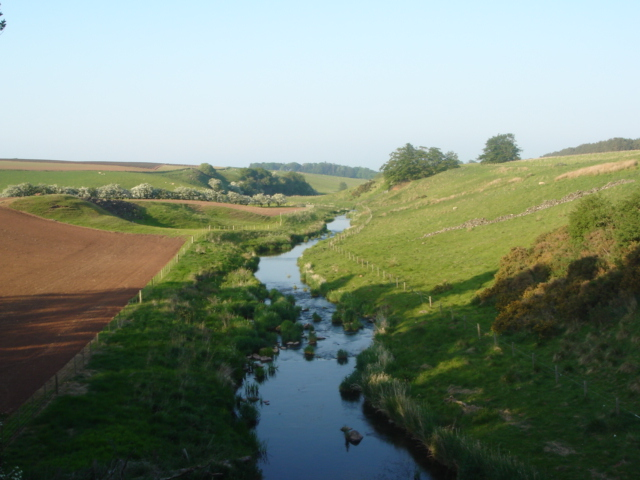
- Blackadder Water below Greenlaw

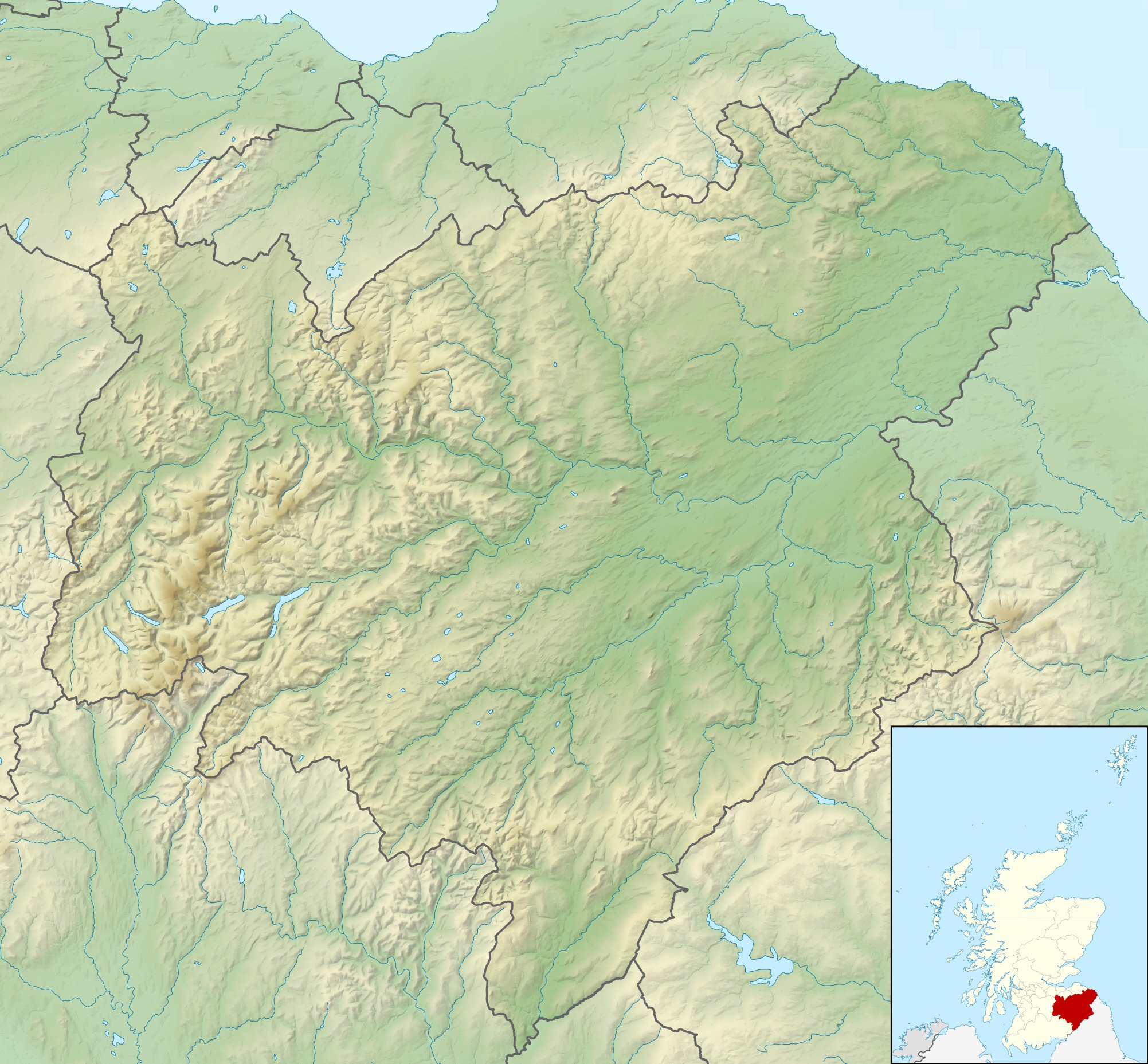
- Location within Scottish Borders
- Location: Scottish Borders
- Coordinates: 55.754°N 2.553°W
- Basin countries: Scotland

Blackadder Water (/ˈblækədər/) is a river in Berwickshire in the Scottish Borders area of Scotland, forming part of the River Tweed system. The water reached a height of 2.84 metres at Mouthbridge, which was its highest level ever recorded on Tuesday 22 October 2002 at 2:45pm.

== Etymology ==
Adder may be derived from Brittonic *ador or *edir, or Old English ǣdre, possible ancient hydronymic terms derived from an Indo-European formation meaning "a watercourse, a channel" (compare River Etherow). From the possible Old English derivation of ǣdre, "a vein" (Anglian ēdre), or *ǣdre, meaning "quickly", arise objections on the basis that these would have maintained the long initial vowel in English and Scots.

Also suggested is derivation from Gaelic fad dûr, meaning "long water".

== Course ==
Rising in the Harecleugh Forest plantation just south of the Twin Law cairns, north of the village of Westruther, the headwaters of the Blackadder join with those of the Wedderlie, Edgar, and Fangrist Burns, before reaching the town of Greenlaw. The river proceeds in a meandering path through the Merse until it meets with the Langton Burn between the estates of Kimmerghame House and Wedderburn Castle. The Blackadder later becomes a tributary of the Whiteadder Water and joins with that river at the village of Allanton, where Blackadder House and its estate once stood.

The Whiteadder then crosses the English Border below Edrington where it joins the Tweed which empties into the North Sea at Berwick-upon-Tweed.

== See also ==
- List of rivers of Scotland
- List of places in the Scottish Borders
- List of places in Scotland
