= Chirnside =

Village in Scottish Borders, Scotland

Coordinates: 55.8021°N 2.2090°W

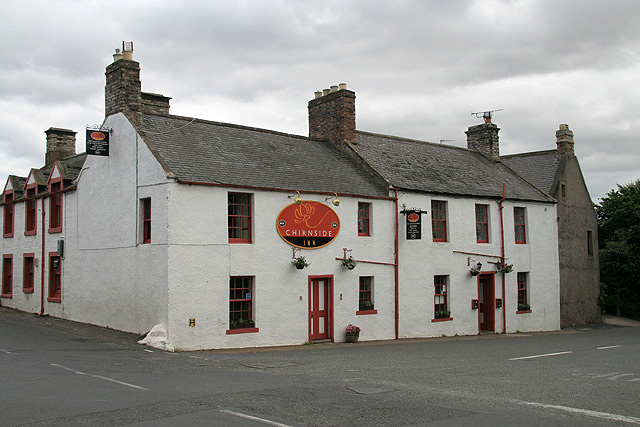
- The Waterloo Inn, which dates to the 1820s

- Location within the Scottish Borders
- Population: 1,450 (2020)
- OS grid reference: NT8656
- Council area: Scottish Borders
- Country: Scotland
- Sovereign state: United Kingdom
- Post town: Duns
- Postcode district: TD11
- Dialling code: 01890
- Police: Scotland
- Fire: Scottish
- Ambulance: Scottish
- UK Parliament: Berwickshire, Roxburgh and Selkirk
- Scottish Parliament: Ettrick, Roxburgh and Berwick

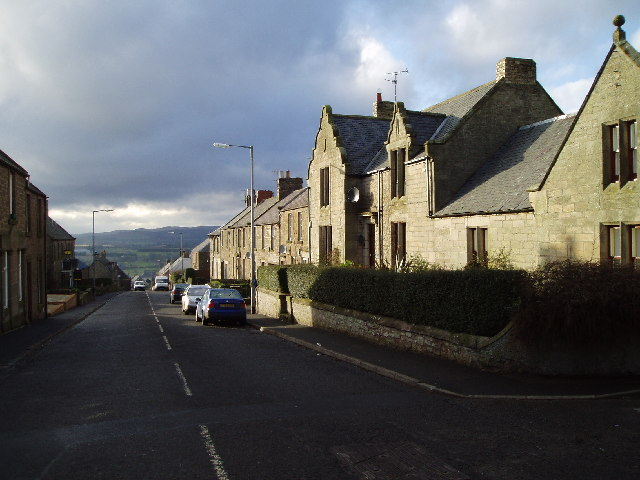
Chirnside.

Chirnside is a hillside village in Berwickshire, Scotland, 9 miles (14 km) west of Berwick-upon-Tweed, and 7 miles (11 km) east of Duns.

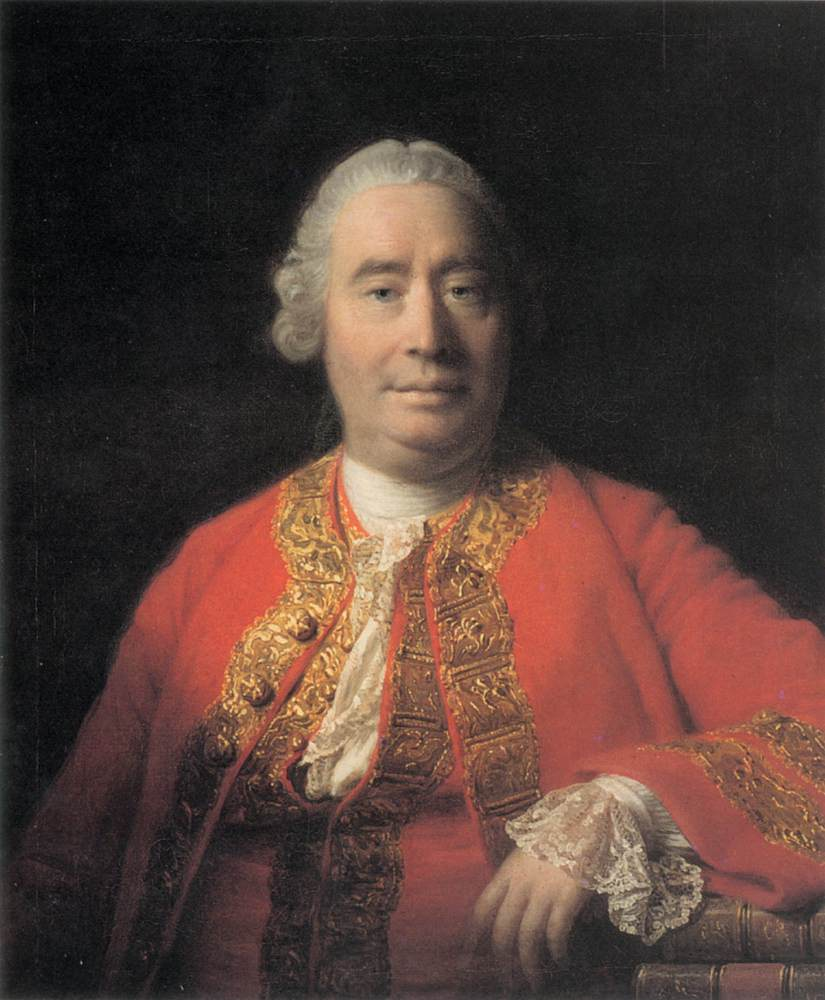
David Hume.

== Church ==
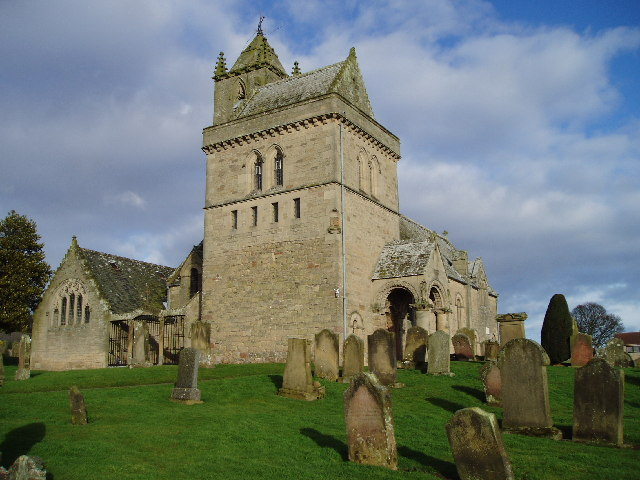
Parish Kirk.

The parish church at Chirnside dates from the 12th century. It was substantially rebuilt in 1878 and extensively restored, and altered in 1907. The rebuildings now incorporate all of the original church(es), however the original chevron-patterned Norman doorway at the west end remains.

== Dovecot aviaries ==
The Ninewells Doocot, a short walk up the school path from the graveyard, is a 16th-century circular beehive type doocot (dovecot). Not far from the manor, stands the Whitehall Doocot, rectangular-planned, and two-chamber, with stone skews defining its mono-pitched roof.

== Whitehall ==
Whitehall Manor, 1997

Below Chirnside stands the estate of Whitehall, formerly with a Georgian manor house containing Palladian windows, which was a Listed Building. It contained a first floor music room richly decorated in Italian plasterwork. Once owned by the Hall of Dunglass family, William Hall of Whitehall (died circa 1749) was one of the Principal Clerks of the Court of Session. It passed early in the 19th century to Mitchell-Innes of Ayton Castle family who held it until the 1980s.

Since then the house, and its park passed through the hands of developers, and from 2007 the manor had been derelict, and seriously at risk. The partial demolition of the back quarters of the house left Whitehall completely open, and dangerous to the public. The Georgian manor was demolished in 2015.

== Ninewells House ==
Ninewells, named for the springs that flow from the hillside into the Whiteadder Water.

It was home to several generations of Homes (later Humes) and was the childhood home, and later the summer home, of David Hume (1711–1776) philosopher, economist, and writer.

The original Ninewells house was entirely rebuilt by William Burn in 1839–1841 for Elizabeth Hume in a Tudor style, but was demolished in 1954.

In the 19th century it was described as 'a handsome Tudor edifice of 1840–41, successor to an older mansion, which was the boyish home, though not the birthplace, of the historian, and philosopher, David Hume (1711–76), and his occasional residence after his fame was won. It was the seat, too, of his nephew, and namesake, Baron Hume (1756–1838), the eminent writer on criminal jurisprudence. The present proprietor, James Alexander Ross-Hume, Esq. (b. 1851; suc. 1864), holds 1,024 acres (4.14 km^{2}) in the shire, valued at £2162 per annum'

During World War Two it was designated as a hostel for Polish, and Eastern European displaced persons. Some Polish army personnel were billeted there, and some also lodged with Chirnside families. Around 1942–1943 it was designated as prisoner of war camp (236).

The Ninewells Walled Garden stands on the A6437 south of the village (early 19th century).

== Billie Castle ==
Sited 2 miles (3 km) north of Chirnside on the Billie Burn, is the remains of Billie Castle. A castle of the Rentons, it was attacked several times in the 16th century.

It was destroyed, along with Bonkle and Blanerne Castle during Hereford's Raid of 1544, part of The Rough Wooing of Scotland. It was restored prior to being abandoned in the 18th century. It was a ruin by 1834.

It appears to have consisted of an oblong tower house, with walls, and a moat. There are also the remains of lime kilns.

== School ==
Chirnside Primary School, 1937, by architects Messrs Reid & Forbes, is set into a hillside, and being white, can be seen for miles around. The corridors and walls were originally meant to be the same stonework as the entrance hall, but when the Second World War broke out the Italians who were working on the decoration were sent back to Italy, so the corridors and walls remained plain. The Army wanted to move into the new school, but were told that they could have the old school (on the site of the Jim Clark clock and car park at the top of The Crosshill), and that the new school would be used for the purpose it was designed for. After the war the old school was demolished, leaving The Schoolhouse's end wall thinner than the others as the school had originally been joined on.

== Paper Mill ==
The Chirnside Bridge Paper Mill, now a large manufacturer, is a survivor from an earlier era. Originally constructed in 1842 and 1857 by David Cousin (also responsible for Dean Cemetery), with additions in 1897, and reductions in 1971–1973. The Italianate administrative block was built as a house for the owner of the mill. There was an earlier mill and house on the site, and the porter's lodge, now a store, is a Gothic octagonal single–storey–and–basement building which probably dates from this period.

== Berwickshire Railway ==
Chirnside had a railway station on the North British Railway's Berwickshire Railway (opened 1863), in the hamlet of Chirnsidebridge. The railway line ran from Reston to Earlston, joining the East Coast Main Line to the Waverley Line. A five span rounded arch railway bridge was built over the Whiteadder Water in 1863 to carry the railway.

Chirnside Railway Station was closed to passenger traffic 10 September 1951. Freight continued until 19 July 1965. The station building still stands, currently used for storing agricultural supplies.

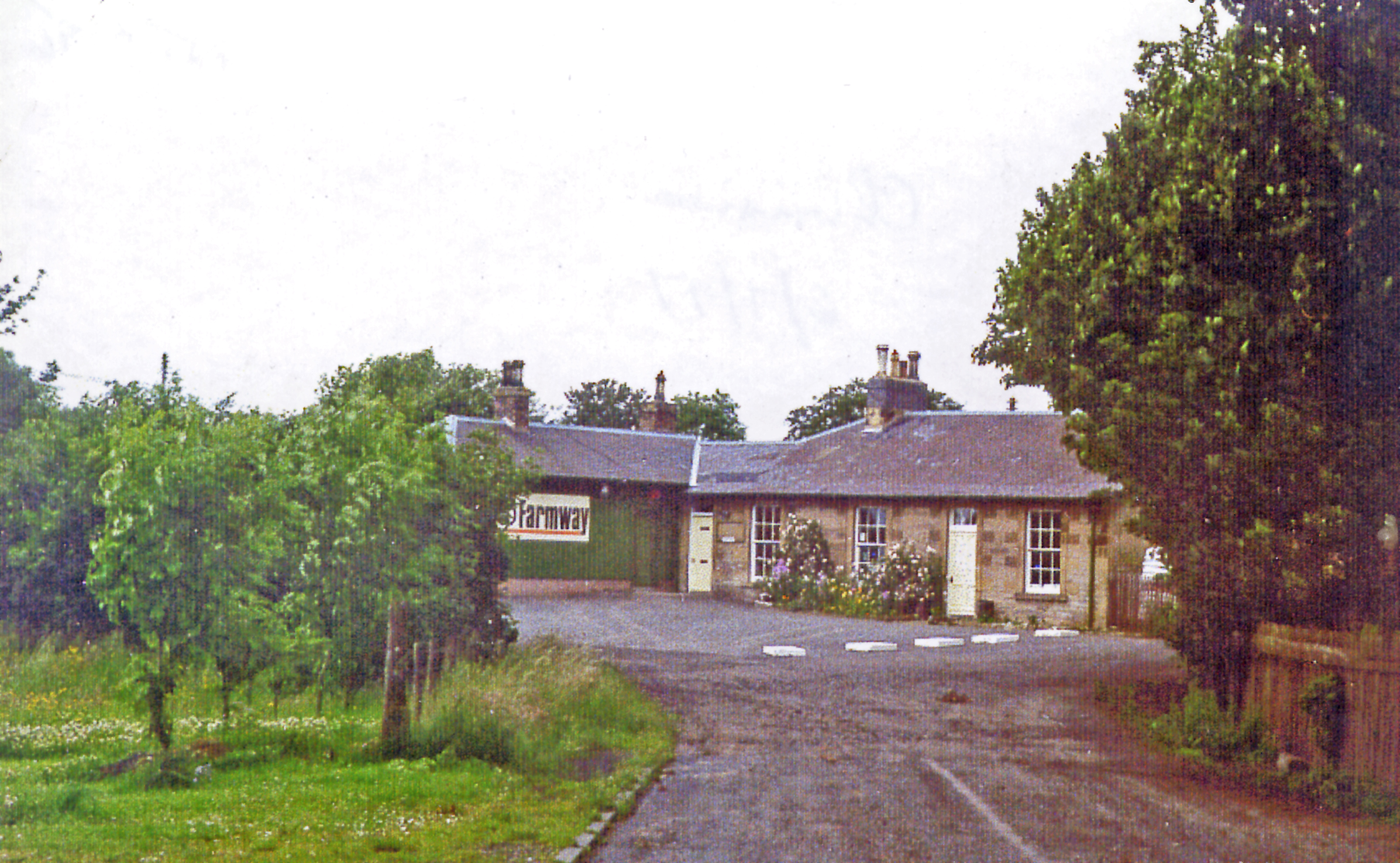
The former station in 1997

== Dialect of Chirnside ==
The distinctive traditional dialect of the Scots language that is spoken in Chirnside was the subject of a study by Swiss dialectologist Paul Wettstein, published in 1942. In the dialect Chirnside is pronounced "Churn-side".

== Sport ==
The local football team, Chirnside F.C., plays in the Border Amateur league, and appeared nine times in the Scottish Cup between 1935 and 1966.

== Notable people ==
David Hume, the Scottish Enlightenment philosopher, lived in Ninewells House, just south of the village (see below). His nephew, the noted Scottish jurist David, later Baron Hume, was baptised at Chirnside in 1757.

Chirnside is also the final resting place of Jim Clark, former world champion Formula One racing-car driver, who set up the Border Reivers (racing team). At the top of the Crosshill, there is a memorial plaque and clock at the side of the main road through the village. The graveyard lies at the bottom of the Crosshill. The Jim Clark Motorsport Museum can be found in Duns. Prior to going to private school Jim Clark attended Chirnside Primary School.

Joelle Murray, Scottish internationalist, and Hibs footballer, is from the village.

Liam Craig, the former footballer, is from the village.

Near the kirk once stood a tower house (demolished in the 18th century), built by the Earl of Dunbar, once the superior here.

== See also ==
- List of places in the Scottish Borders
- List of places in East Lothian
- List of places in Edinburgh
- List of places in Midlothian
- List of places in West Lothian
- List of places in Scotland
- History of Scotland
- Timeline of Scottish history
- Scotland in the Early Middle Ages
- Scotland in the High Middle Ages
- Scotland in the Late Middle Ages
- Economic history of Scotland
- Scottish Marches
- Scottish Borders
- Anglo-Scottish border
- Debatable Lands
- Border Reivers
- List of castles in Scotland
- Borders Family History Society
- Clan Home
- Climate of Scotland
- Geography of Scotland
- Geology of Scotland
