= Skateraw Lifeboat Station =

Former RNLI lifeboat station in East Lothian, Scotland

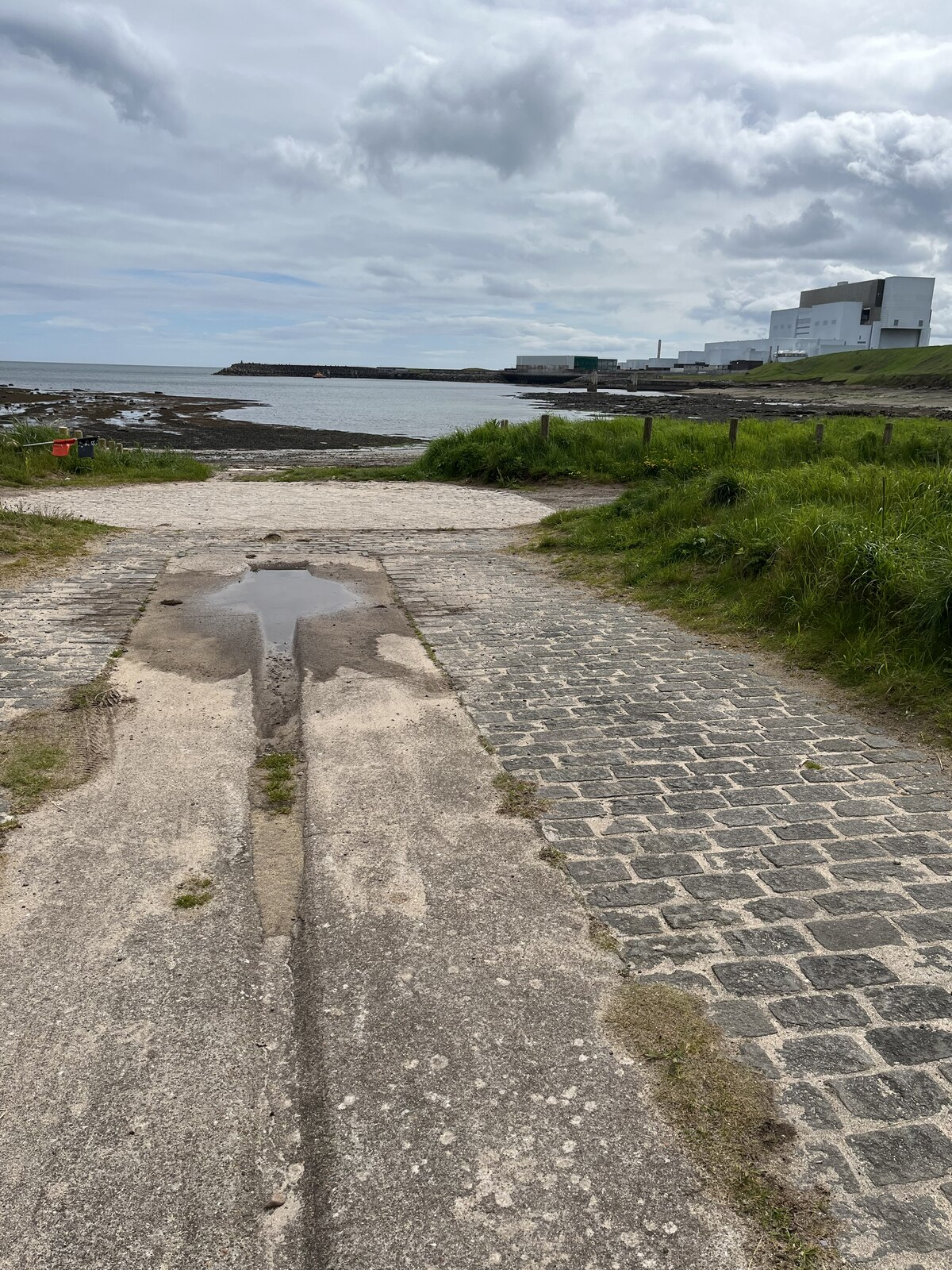
- Remains of Skateraw lifeboat station

- Skateraw, East Lothian

General information
- Status: Closed
- Location: Skateraw Beach, Skateraw, East Lothian, EH42 1QR, Scotland
- Coordinates: 55°58′20.9″N 2°25′22.2″W
- Opened: 13 April 1907
- Closed: 1943

Skateraw Lifeboat Station was located at Skateraw, a hamlet approximately 5 miles (8.0 km) south-east of Dunbar, now in the shadow of Torness nuclear power station, on the coast of East Lothian, formerly Haddingtonshire, Scotland.

A lifeboat station was established at Skateraw in 1907, by the Royal National Lifeboat Institution (RNLI), operating as a satellite station of Dunbar.

After 36 years in operation, Skateraw Lifeboat Station was closed in 1943.

== History ==
Owing to difficulties transporting the Dunbar lifeboat east overland, the RNLI committee of management decided to place an additional lifeboat 4.2 nautical miles (7.8 km) east of Dunbar at Skateraw, in Haddingtonshire. Should the lifeboat be needed, the crew from Dunbar would be called.

On Saturday 13 April 1907, a crowd of several hundred people gathered next to the shore at Skateraw Beach, for the inauguration of the newly constructed lifeboat station, and naming ceremony of the new lifeboat. Others attending included Provost Daniel Smith; the Magistrates and Town Councillors of Dunbar; Lady Catherine Leslie Wingate, wife of the Sirdar of Egypt; the lifeboat coxswains of Berwick-upon-Tweed, North Berwick and Eyemouth; and a Miss Lawson, a generous friend of Dunbar Lifeboat Station, who agreed to assist in the ceremony.

The new lifeboat was a 35-foot Liverpool-class self-righting 'Pulling and Sailing' (P&S) lifeboat, one with sails and (12) oars, double-banked, and was fitted with two water ballast tanks and two drop-keels. The lifeboat type had been chosen by the Dunbar lifeboat crew, and was funded by the bequest of £1,798-16s-8d from the late Mr. Edwin Kay of Southsea, Hampshire.

After a service of dedication conducted by the Rev. T. W. G. Sutherland of Innerwick, the boathouse door was formally opened by Miss Lawson, who was then presented with a commemorative silver key on a life-buoy style keyring. The lifeboat was then rolled out of the boathouse on its carriage, and after being formally handed to the care of the local lifeboat committee, Miss Lawson named the lifeboat Sarah Kay (ON 569) in accordance with the wishes of the donor.

In the early hours of 20 July 1914, the steamship Norway of Christiania, on passage to Grangemouth, was stranded off Skateraw, with a cargo of paper, and 11 passengers. The Dunbar Rocket Brigade was despatched, and the lifeboat crew from Dunbar launched the Sarah Kay. The lifeboat stood by until the following day, taking off the 11 passengers in the afternoon.

On 7 July 1915, in gale force conditions, a naval barge ran aground 4 miles (6.4 km) east of Cockburnspath. The lifeboat Sarah Kay was launched shortly after 13:00, into rough seas that swept over the lifeboat constantly. Unable to get along side, the nine men aboard were recovered to the lifeboat, by dragging them through the surf attached to a line. The lifeboat crew finally arrived home exhausted at 21:00, having been wet through for most of the day.

By the mid 1930s, there were motor-powered lifeboats at all flanking stations, St Abbs, Eyemouth, Anstruther, and even the crew had their own motor-lifeboat at Dunbar. Despite this, it was only in 1943 that the Sarah Kay (P&S) lifeboat, the only lifeboat to have served at Skateraw, was withdrawn. Skateraw Lifeboat Station was closed in 1943. Sarah Kay (ON 569) was sold from service in 1943, and was renamed Grace Darling III, before being lost off Skegness in 1966. Only the cobbled floor, and the foundations of the boathouse still exist.

The current Dunbar lifeboat is too large to operate out of Dunbar Harbour at low water. Since 1995, the Dunbar lifeboat crew once again have to travel the 5 miles (8.0 km) to Skateraw Bay, where their lifeboat is kept on a mooring at Torness, in full view of the remains of the old boathouse.

== Alfred Erlandsen ==
Not all lifeboat calls end in success. One of the first calls on the Skateraw lifeboat was to the Danish vessel Alfred Erlandsen, which had struck Ebbscar Rock off St Abbs on 17 October 1907, on passage to Grangemouth from Latvia with a cargo of Pit props. Aboard were 12 crew, the Captain, and his wife. Only 600 yards (550 m) from shore, land-based help was impossible. Coxswain Walter Fairbairn described the launch. "The launching slip was one minute in a whirlpool of angry water, the next entirely dry as the waves receded". The lifeboat launched, and was immediately tossed about, and filled with water nine times before she had gone even 1000 yards. The lifeboat would be so delayed fighting the rough seas, that she was too late, and arrived on scene to be surrounded by a field of floating debris, with pit props crashing against the lifeboat. The ship had broken her back about an hour before the lifeboat arrived, and all aboard the vessel were lost, except a dog, which was washed up on the shore the following day. The tragedy would prompt the opening of the lifeboat station at St Abbs in 1911.

== Skateraw lifeboat ==
ON (Note: ON is the RNLI's Official Number of the boat.)	Name	Built	On station	Class	Comments
569	Sarah Kay	1906	1907–1943	35-foot Liverpool (P&S)	(Note: 35-foot x 10-foot (12-oared) Liverpool-class non-self-righting (P&S) lifeboat, legacy of Mr E. Kay of Southsea, built by Thames Ironworks of Blackwall, London, costing £938.)

Station Closed, 1943

== See also ==
- List of RNLI stations
- List of former RNLI stations
- Royal National Lifeboat Institution lifeboats
