= St Abbs Lifeboat Station =

Independent lifeboat station in the Scottish Borders, Scotland

- St Abbs Lifeboat Thomas Tunnock and St Abbs Lifeboat Station

- Location within Scotland

General information
- Type: Independent Lifeboat Station
- Location: St Abbs Lifeboat Station, St Abbs Harbour, St Abbs, Berwickshire, Scotland, UK, Scotland, UK
- Coordinates: 55.8989°N 2.1287°W
- Opened: 1911
- Owner: St Abbs Lifeboat

Website
- www.stabbslifeboat.org.uk

St Abbs Lifeboat is an independent voluntary search and rescue lifeboat service based in the village of St Abbs, located on the southeast coast of Scotland in the Scottish Borders.

St Abbs lifeboat station has been operational since 1911, providing search and rescue cover along the Berwickshire coastline and out into the North Sea. Since 2015, it has been operated by an independent charity following the withdrawal of support from the Royal National Lifeboat Institution (RNLI). This means the community and crew are responsible for all aspects of running the station, including governance, fundraising, training, and maintenance. The lifeboat station and lifeboat shop are run entirely by unpaid volunteers.

St Abbs Lifeboat Station holds "Declared Facility Status" (DFS), a standard set by the Maritime & Coastguard Agency (MCA), qualifying the station to participate in the UK Coastguard's Search and Rescue (SAR) service.

The station currently operates the inshore lifeboat Thomas Tunnock. She is one of the fastest lifeboats in the UK, with a maximum speed of 40 knots. This enables the crew, who are on call 24 hours a day, 365 days a year, to respond swiftly to anyone in need of assistance along the Berwickshire coast.

In November 2026, the station was awarded the King's Award for Voluntary Service.

== History ==
On 17 October 1907, the S.S. Alfred Erlandsen was wrecked on the Ebb Carr Rocks, near St Abbs. Lifeboats were launched from Skateraw and Eyemouth, but in the conditions, took too long to reach the wreck, and all 17 crew members were lost.

Following the sinking of S.S. Alfred Erlandsen, Miss Jane Hay of St Abbs wrote to the Edinburgh Evening News. "As one of those who witnessed the tragedy which occurred at St Abbs on Thursday night, I write to say that personally I shall never rest content till we have a lifeboat and rocket apparatus of our own in St Abbs". She went on to convene a public meeting, to petition the RNLI for a lifeboat for St Abbs, but it wasn't a long campaign. A visit to the village by the Chief Inspector of Lifeboats was soon arranged, and following his report, read at a meeting of the RNLI committee of management on Thursday 9 January 1908, less than three months after the wreck, it was resolved that a new lifeboat station be established at St Abbs, Berwickshire.

It was also decided to place one of the earliest motor-powered lifeboats at St Abbs, a 38-foot Watson-class, which was constructed by Thames Ironworks of Blackwall, London, and completed in 1910. On 5 April 1911, three new lifeboats set out together to travel the east coast to their new stations, a 40-foot self-righting lifeboat, Henry Vernon (ON 613), for Tynemouth, and two 38ft Watson-class non-self-righting lifeboats, Elliot Galer (ON 602) for Seaham, and the Helen Smitton (ON 603) for St Abbs, as chosen by their respective crews. Setting out from East India Docks into an unseasonal blizzard, the boats only got as far as Sheerness on the first day, before it was decided that progress was futile, and the boats docked for 2 days. St Abbs Lifeboat Station was finally established when Helen Smitton arrived on 25 April 1911. Jane Hay was appointed Honorary Secretary.

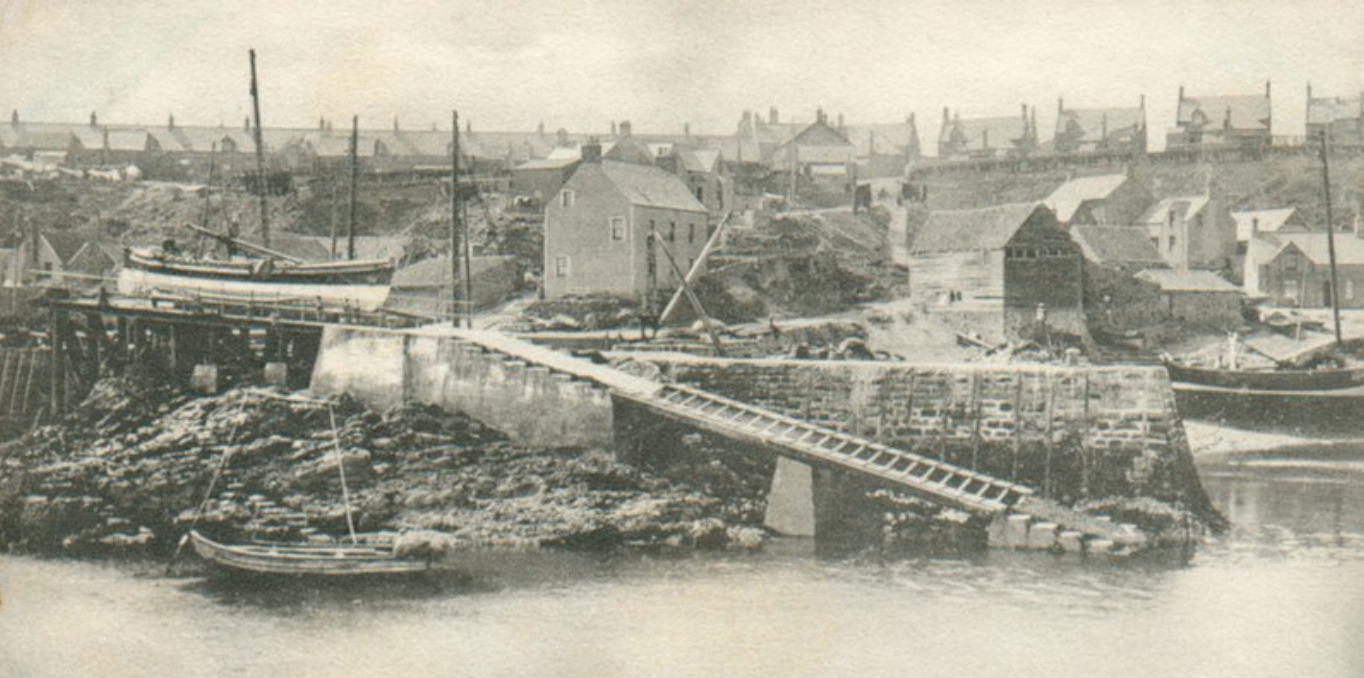
Lifeboat Helen Smitton at the station before the boat house was added.

The RNLI Journal of May 1914 recorded the obituary of Jane Hay, who died on 26 January 1914. She was one of just a very few women to ever hold the office of Honorary Secretary within the RNLI. She had insured her life for a sum of £200, and that sum was put towards the construction of the new St Abbs lifeboat house, which was completed in 1915.

Three more All-weather lifeboats would be placed at St Abbs, before the station's last All-weather lifeboat. It was a 37-foot Oakley-class, 37-07 Jane Hay (ON 974), named after the original Honorary Secretary from 1911, and was on station from 1964. In 1974, with the placement of the fast Waveney-class lifeboat at Eyemouth, it was decided to replace the All-weather lifeboat at St Abbs with a smaller Inshore lifeboat.

Initially the smaller D-class lifeboat was placed on service, but this was replaced with a C-class lifeboat (effectively a twin-engined D-class) in 1979, and then a larger B-class (Atlantic 21) RIB in 1986. followed by the slightly larger B-class (Atlantic 75) in 2002.

=== Transition to an Independent Lifeboat Station ===
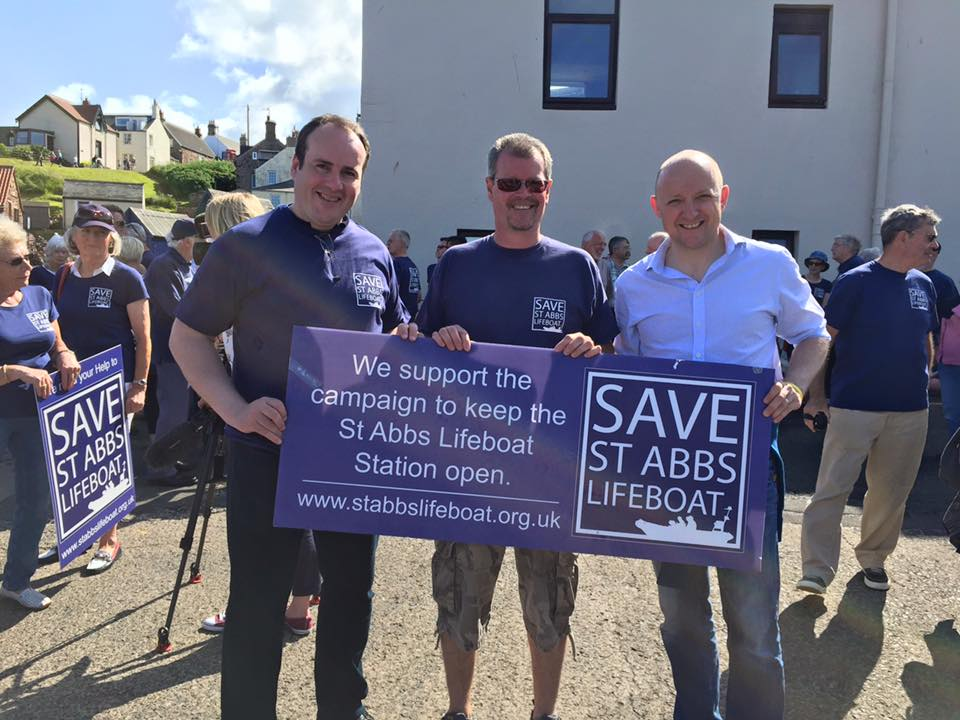
Save St Abbs Lifeboat Station - July 2015

In early 2015, after 104 years of operation, the RNLI executive proposed the withdrawal of the St Abbs lifeboat. This decision was based on a coastal review undertaken without local consultation. In response, the crew and community came together to form the Save St Abbs Lifeboat campaign. Over 2000 Save St Abbs Lifeboat t-shirts were distributed and a petition, which attracted over 13,000 signatures, was hand-delivered to RNLI Headquarters in Poole, urging the RNLI to reconsider. Despite this, the RNLI withdrew their lifeboat from the station on 6 September 2015.

Following the withdrawal, the campaign shifted focus towards establishing an independent charity to operate St Abbs Lifeboat Station (boathouse and slipway were owned by the community and not the RNLI). Within two months, £60,000 was raised through fundraising efforts. Then, in late November 2015, Sir Boyd Tunnock, owner of Thomas Tunnock & Sons Ltd, a Scottish confectionery company, contributed £260,000 towards the purchase of a new lifeboat.

== St Abbs Lifeboat Thomas Tunnock ==
St Abbs Lifeboat Thomas Tunnock

The new lifeboat arrived at the station on 28 July 2016 and was officially named Thomas Tunnock during a ceremony on 17 September 2016. Thomas Tunnock is a MST900W rigid inflatable boat (RIB), built by Marine Specialised Technology Limited (MST) in Liverpool. She has a maximum speed of 40 knots and is one of the fastest lifeboats in the UK.

St Abbs Lifeboat is run as an independent charity (SCIO) registered in Scotland (Charity Number SC046312). The charity operates an independent volunteer search and rescue service with "Declared Facility Status" (DFS), a standard set by the Maritime & Coastguard Agency (MCA).

=== Specification of lifeboat ===
St Abbs Lifeboat - Thomas Tunnock

- Name: Thomas Tunnock
- Manufacturer: Marine Specialised Technology
- Model: 900W
- Crew: 4
- Length Overall: 9 metres
- Beam Overall: 3.05 metres
- Beam internal: 1.95 metres
- Draught: 0.7 metres or 1 metres to base of skegs at 100% fuel and four crew.
- Displacement: 2600 kg
- Maximum speed: 40 kts
- Fuel capacity: 300 litres (split over 2 tanks of 150 litres)
- Range: 150 nautical miles (173 miles or 278 km)
- Construction: Polyester Glass Reinforced Resin (GPR) hull, and GRP protected marine plywood for her under deck structure
- Engines: Twin Mercury Optimax 200 hp direct injection outboard motors, modified with a Post Immersion Restart System (PIRS)
- Survivor capacity: 12

== Honours and awards ==
The crew of the St Abbs lifeboat have received various honours in recognition of their bravery and service. All those listed below served at St Abbs Lifeboat Station both during its time under RNLI and independent management.

- RNLI Bronze Medal

Darren Alexander Crowe, Helm – 2012

- The Walter and Elizabeth Groombridge Award 2011
  (for the outstanding inshore lifeboat rescue of the year)

Darren Alexander Crowe, Helm – 2012

- Shipwrecked Fishermen and Mariners' Royal Benevolent Society Award

Darren Alexander Crowe, Helm – 2012

- Brave@Heart Award

Darren Alexander Crowe – 2012
James Crowe – 2012
Alistair Crowe – 2012

- St Andrew's Award

Darren Alexander Crowe – 2012

- A Framed Letter of Thanks signed by the Chairman of the RNLI

James Crowe – 2012
Alistair Crowe – 2012

- Letter of Appreciation signed by the Chief Executive of the RNLI

David Wilson – 2012

=== Bronze Medal awarded to Darren Crowe ===
On 6 June 2011, a man fishing at the foot of the cliffs at St Abb's Head slipped and fell into the water and was washed into Ty's Tunnel. Lifeboat Helm Darren Crowe volunteered to swim into the cave, in dangerous and violent conditions, attached to a line. Both men were then pulled from the cave. Crowe was awarded the RNLI Bronze Medal for gallantry and the St Andrews Award for bravery.

=== The King's Award for Voluntary Service ===
In November 2026, St Abbs Independent Lifeboat received the honour from King Charles III in recognition of its voluntary maritime rescue work in St Abbs and along the Berwickshire coast. Equivalent to an MBE for volunteer groups, it is the highest award given to local voluntary organisations in the United Kingdom.

== St Abbs Lifeboats ==
=== All-weather lifeboats operated at St Abbs as part of the RNLI ===
ON	Op. No.	Name	On Station	Class	Launches / Saved	Comments
603	–	Helen Smitton	1911–1936	38ft Watson	27/37	(Note: 38-foot x 10-foot Watson-class non-self-righting (motor) lifeboat, powered by a single 34bhp Wolseley petrol engine, built by Thames Ironworks of Blackwall, London.)
792	–	Annie Ronald and Isabella Forrest	1936–1949	Liverpool (single engine)	28/73	
872	–	J.B. Couper of Glasgow	1949–1953	Liverpool	4/1	
906	–	W. Ross MacArthur of Glasgow	1953–1964	Liverpool	32/13	
974	37-07	Jane Hay	1964–1974	37-foot Oakley	20/8	

All-weather lifeboat withdrawn, 1974

=== Inshore lifeboats operated at St Abbs as part of the RNLI ===
Op. No.	Name	On Station	Class	Comments
D-110	Unnamed	1974–1975	D-class (RFD PB16)	
D-235	Unnamed	1975–1978	D-class (Zodiac III)	
C-505 (D-505)	Unnamed	1979–1986	C-class (Zodiac Grand Raid IV)	
B-572	Dorothy and Katherine Barr	1986–2001	B-class (Atlantic 21)	
B-579	Institute of London Underwriters	2001–2002	B-class (Atlantic 21)	
B-568	Burton Brewer	2002	B-class (Atlantic 21)	
B-783	Dorothy and Katherine Barr II	2002–2015	B-class (Atlantic 75)	
B-770	The Boys Brigade	2015	B-class (Atlantic 75)	

RNLI inshore lifeboat withdrawn, 2015

=== Inshore lifeboats operated at St Abbs since independence ===
Name	On Station	Class	MMSI	Comments
Thomas Tunnock	2016–	MST 900W	232004684	

== See also ==
- List of former RNLI stations
- Independent lifeboats in Britain and Ireland
