= Coldingham Bay =

Inlet in the North Sea coast

Coordinates: 55.89246°N 2.13268°W

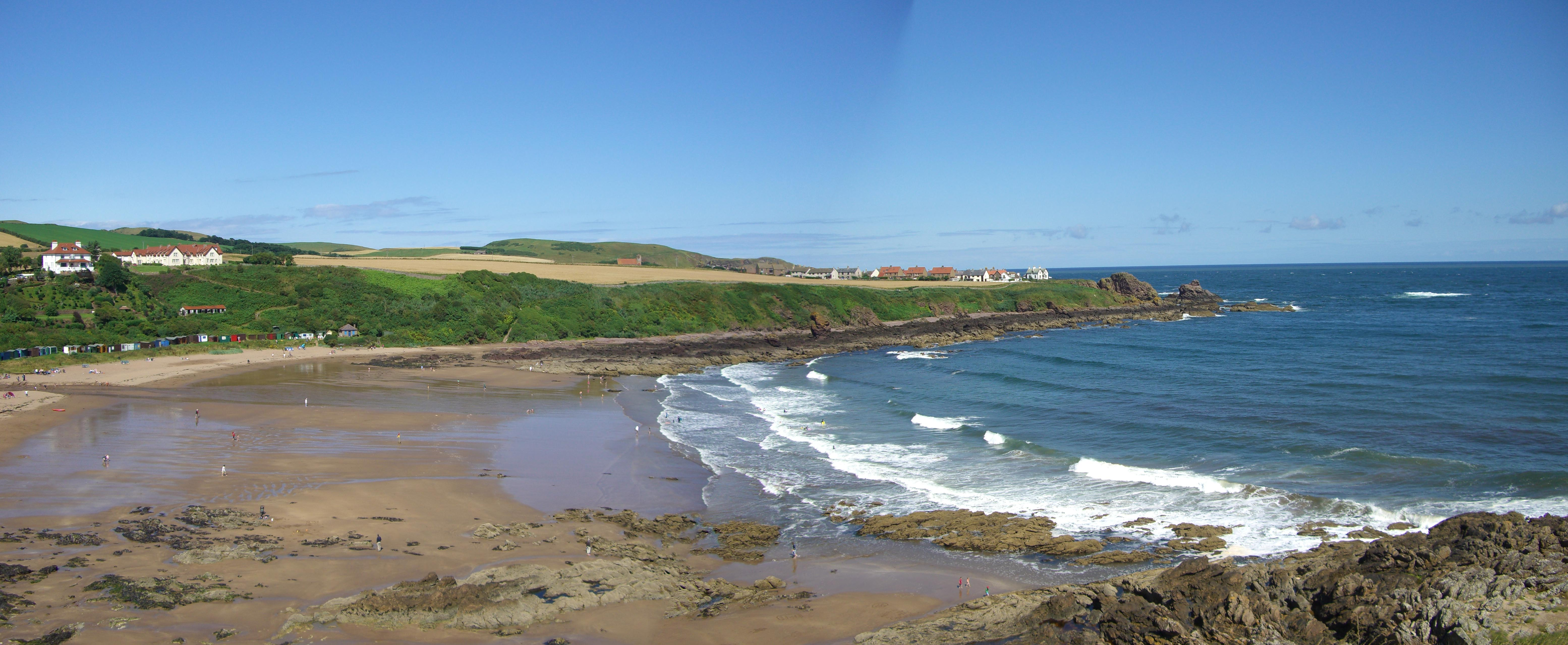
A panorama shot of Coldingham Sands from Homeli Knoll, the village of St Abbs is just visible over the headland.

Coldingham Bay is an inlet in the North Sea coast, just over three kilometres north of the town of Eyemouth in the Scottish Borders area of Scotland. It is situated at grid reference NT918666 and is easily reached by a minor road which leaves the B6438 road at Coldingham.

== The Beach ==
Coldingham Sands is the name of the large beach in the Bay. It attracts many visitors, and on busy days there can be over 1000 visitors on the beach. Coldingham Sands is a sandy seashore, which is a rare occurrence on Berwickshire's rocky coast. The beach was awarded the prestigious Blue Flag award in 2010 and has also received the Seaside Award which is for beaches that are more rural in character, being quieter and less developed. The Marine Conservation Society awarded the beach its top award for cleanliness in 2006, 2007, 2008, 2009 and 2010. There is a cafe, toilets, disabled access and car parking.

The beach, which is approximately 200 metres wide, is well sheltered by headlands to the north and south (Yellow Craig Head), with rocky sections at both extremities of the sand. The beach is popular with surfers and bodyboarders, and a lifeguard attends the beach during busy summer periods. The north end of the beach has 55 beach huts, some of which are believed to be about 100 years old. The huts are leased from the Scottish Borders Council which owns the sands but not the huts. At the top of the high ground above the huts are several private dwellings plus the Dunlaverock House hotel.

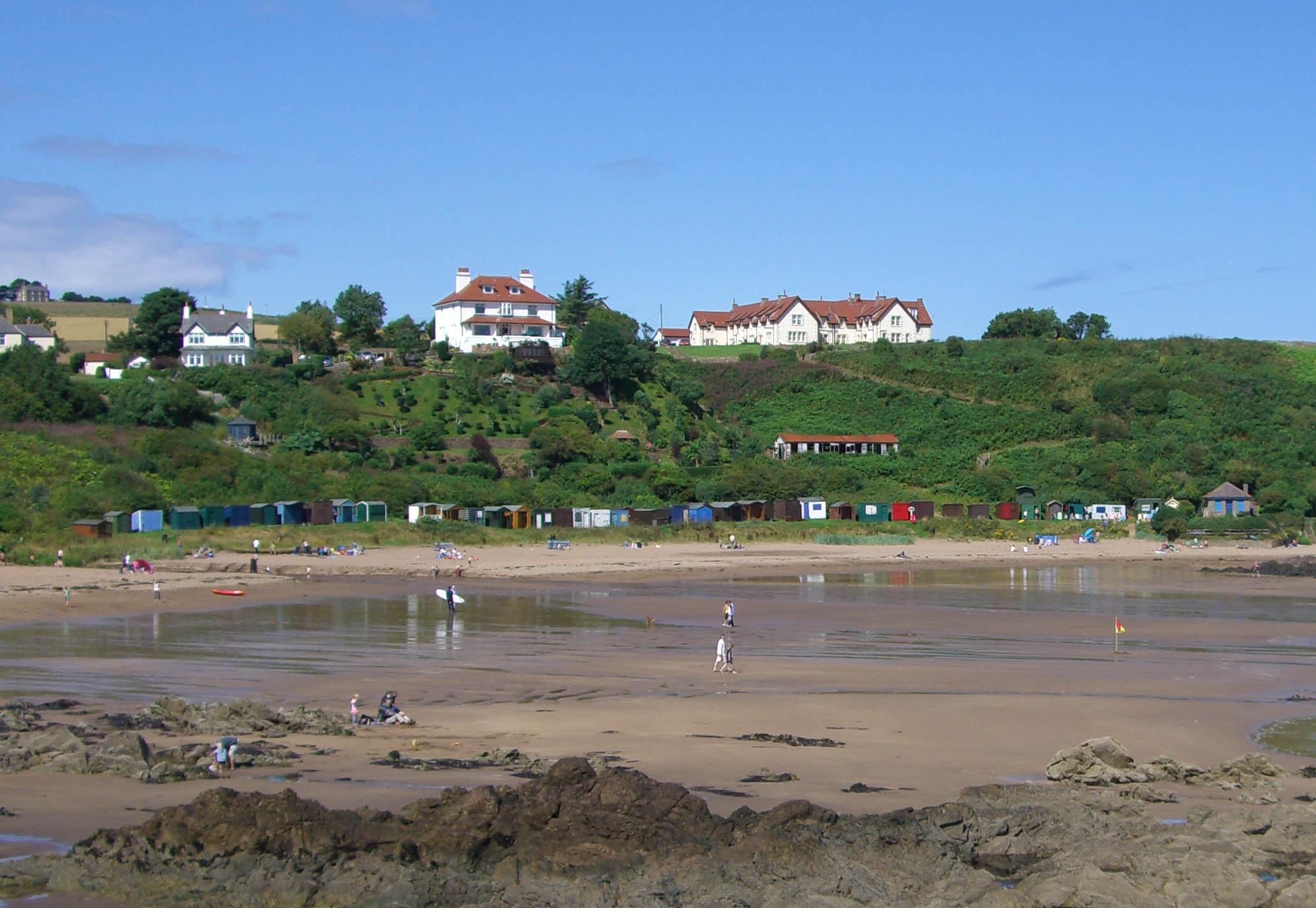
The north side of the beach showing the beach huts with the Dunlaverock House hotel and the St Abb’s Haven Hotel above.

== The Bay and its surroundings ==
Coldingham Bay is situated within the St. Abbs and Eyemouth Voluntary Marine Reserve which itself is part of the Berwickshire and North Northumberland Coast Special Area of Conservation. The rocky shore around the bay has much marine life, with many types of sea creatures and seaweed to be found. The large area of tide pools is popular with rockpoolers. Slightly inland from the seashore is an area of dunes and grassland which provides a fragile habitat for a host of plants and animals. Visitors are requested to keep to the paths, not to pick flowers or light fires in this area to protect the environment.

The Berwickshire Coastal Path goes round the perimeter of the bay and provides walks that give easy access to St Abbs and Eyemouth. At the southern extremity of the beach lies Homeli Knoll (or Knowe), a steep-sided hillock which provides fine views of the beach area and along the coast. The south-facing slope of the Knoll has seen sightings of the small blue butterfly and its sole larval food plant kidney vetch (Anthyllis vulneraria) grows there. The north slope of the Knoll is a popular site for cowslip. Milldown Burn flows into the southern part of the Bay and is its main inflowing water source, rising on Coldingham Moor and running for 6 km through the village of Coldingham before reaching the Bay. On the north side of the bay stands The Kip, an eight-metre-high sea stack which stands on dry land at low tide. At the southern extremity of the bay are the 30-metre-high grassy cliffs of Yellow Craig.

Other accommodation facilities for visitors to Coldingham Bay are available at the St Vedas Hotel which was built in 1897. The Coldingham Sands Youth Hostel, another late 19th-century house, was closed by the Scottish Youth Hostels Association in early 2008 after low visitor numbers deterred the investment needed to bring the hostel up to an acceptable standard. Local residents attempted to purchase the hostel under the Community Right to Buy legislation in order to keep it open for visitors who bring trade to the area, but the application to purchase the former hostel was declined in February 2009 by Lottery Funds. The property was purchased by a property development company in 2010 and has since been converted into private housing accommodation.

== Gallery ==
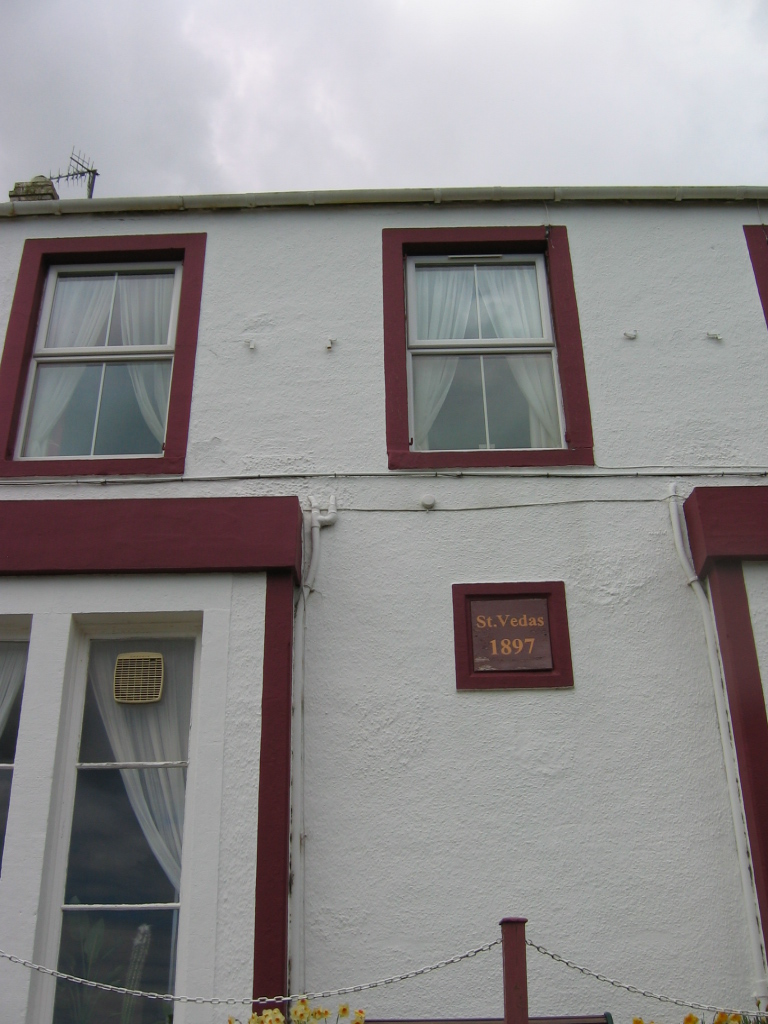
St. Vedas Hotel, Coldingham, Scottish Borders

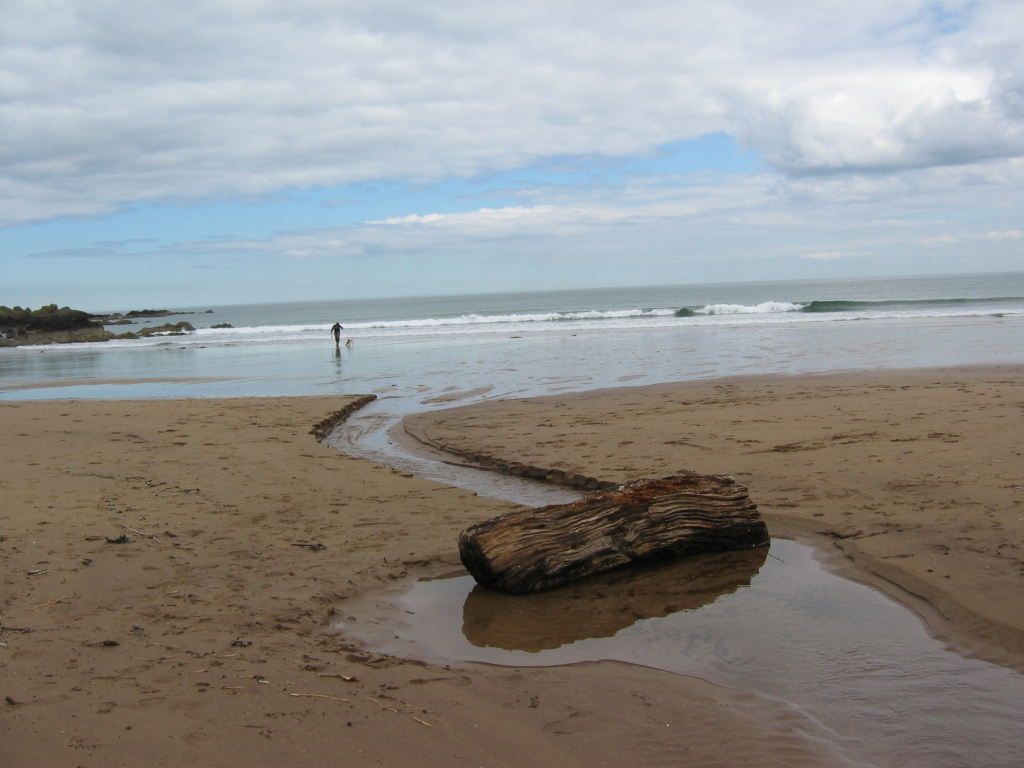
Stream from the Spout (not Milldown burn)

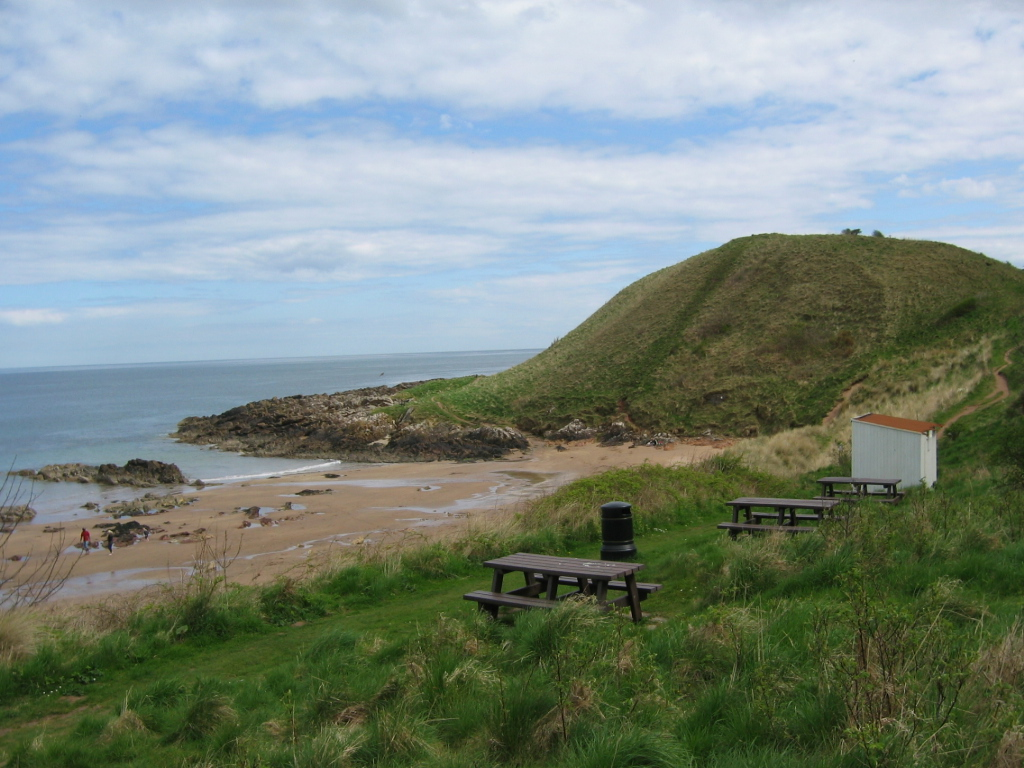
Homeli Knoll, on Coldingham Sands

== See also ==
- Coldingham
- Coldingham Priory
- Prior of Coldingham
- Coldingham Loch
- List of places in the Scottish Borders
- List of places in East Lothian
- List of places in Midlothian
- List of places in West Lothian
- List of places in Scotland
