= Dunbar Lifeboat Station =

RNLI lifeboat station in East Lothian, Scotland

- Dunbar Lifeboat Station in 2025

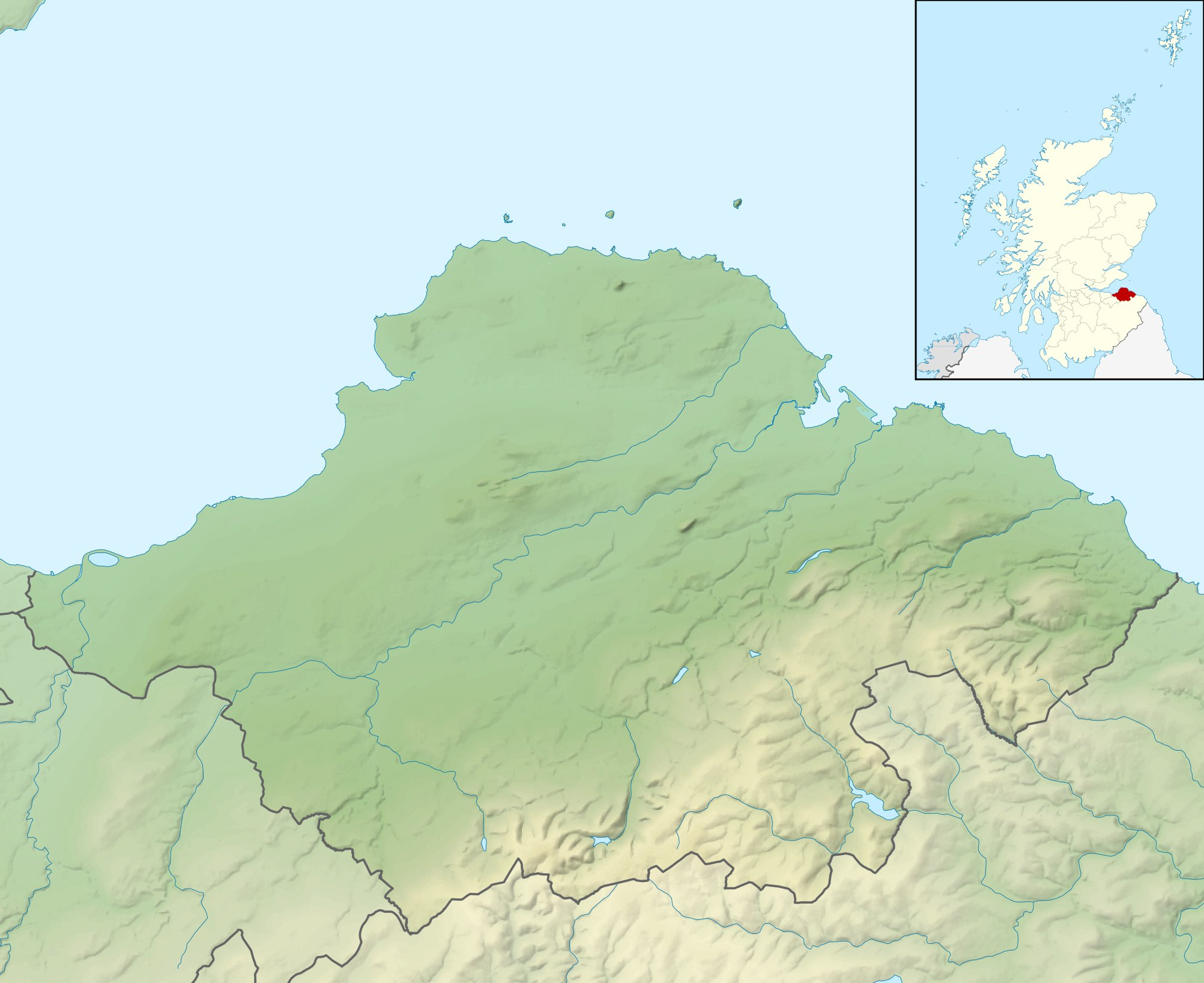
- Location within East Lothian

General information
- Type: RNLI Lifeboat Station
- Location: Victoria Harbour, Victoria Place, Dunbar, East Lothian, EH42 1HS, Scotland
- Coordinates: 56.00504°N 2.51499°W
- Opened: 1808–1821; RNLI 1864–present
- Owner: Royal National Lifeboat Institution

Website
- Dunbar RNLI Lifeboat Station

Dunbar Lifeboat Station is located at Victoria Harbour in Dunbar, a town and former royal burgh overlooking the mouth of the Firth of Forth, in the county of East Lothian, formerly Haddingtonshire, on the south-east coast of Scotland.

A lifeboat station was first established at Dunbar in 1808, but closed in 1821. The station was re-established in 1864 by the Royal National Lifeboat Institution (RNLI).

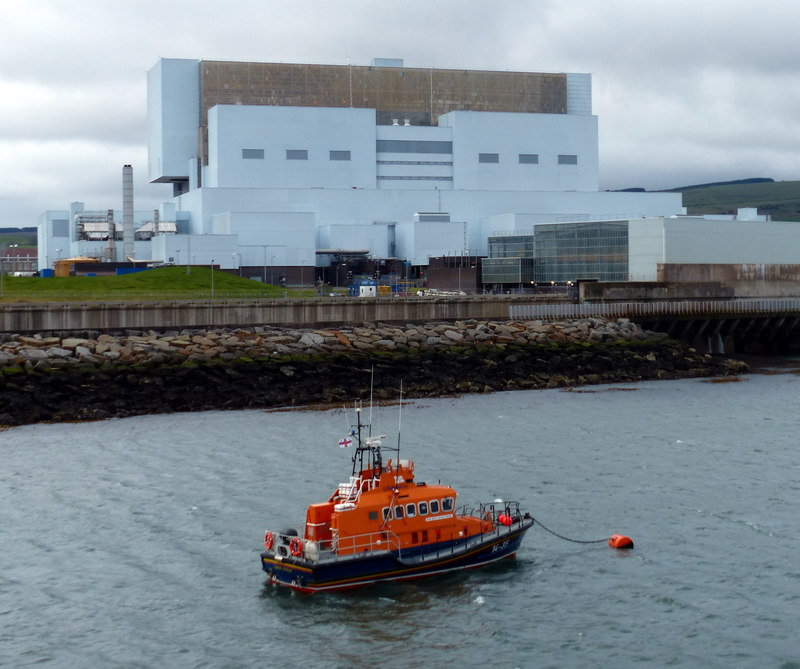
14-35 John Neville Taylor (ON 1266) at Torness

The station currently operates the Trent-class All-weather lifeboat 14-35 John Neville Taylor (ON 1266), on station since 2008, and a D-class (IB1) Inshore lifeboat, David Lauder (D-844), on station since 2019. Due to access issues at Dunbar harbour at low tide, since 1993, the All-weather lifeboat is kept on a mooring approximately 4.2 nautical miles (7.8 km) to the east of Dunbar, in the bay next to Torness nuclear power station.

== History ==
Dunbar Harbour has been a fishing and trading port since at least 1574, and for a considerable period was classified as a port of refuge. In Britain, the history of lifeboats dates (two outliers excepted) to Henry Greathead's 1790 boat at South Shields on the River Tyne in England; in 1824 the Royal National Institution for the Preservation of Life from Shipwreck (RNIPLS) was founded, to take a nationwide interest in the provision of lifeboats, but it was relatively ineffective in its earliest years. Lifeboat provision prior to about 1850 was a matter for local communities, with little institutional support. In 1854, the RNIPLS was renamed the Royal National Lifeboat Institution (RNLI).

Dunbar ranks amongst the earliest harbours to operate a lifeboat, equipping itself with a boat of Henry Greathead's design and manufacture, together with a boat-carriage, boathouse and a Manby apparatus, in 1808. The initiative to establish a station at Dunbar came from George Miller, a native of the town, son of a merchant and established as a bookbinder and bookseller, but having had a long fascination with seafaring. By his own account, he had as a child conceived of mortar-launched lines as a means of reaching shoreline wrecks, many years in advance of George William Manby's successful implementation of the idea, and remained fascinated by shipwreck and rescue. Miller became acquainted with South Shields' lifeboat initiative, when he spent some days from 6 April 1789 undertaking work experience with a bookseller in the town. 1789 was a year in which the town was the 'epicentre of lifeboat innovation', arising out of the highly visible and protracted wrecking of a vessel, the Adventure, on the Herd Sands to the north-east of the South Shields on 14 March. The Newcastle-upon-Tyne Trinity House to hold a competition for the design of a lifeboat, which led to the adoption of Greathead's design.

Miller, with others, campaigned from as early as 1793 for the establishment at Dunbar of a lifesaving operation, suggesting both a mortar and line, and a lifeboat, but their aspirations came to nothing. It took until 1807, prompted by the death of a sailor on 6 September in a shoreline wreck at Thorntonlock, to the east of Dunbar, (Note: Thorntonlock: 55.96237°N 2.39728°W. The exact position of the wreck is not recorded) before Miller's ideas got traction. He floated a proposal for a lifeboat in the Edinburgh Evening Courant and quickly a committee of local 'worthies' was formed, and as quickly, a subscription raised above £366, which by 1808 yielded a Greathead lifeboat, station, carriage and minimal float for expenses. David Anderson's 2002 paper on The Dunbar Lifeboat notes five occasions on which it responded to mariners in distress, but notes that there are no good records of its employment.

On 18 December 1810, HMS Pallas was wrecked in the Firth of Forth. In two trips, the Dunbar lifeboat rescued 45 men. On the third trip, she was overloaded, and capsized. 11 men, including lifeboat man B. Wilson, were lost.

Lack of competent management of the affairs of the lifeboat station brought the Dunbar service to an end sometime after 1818, when damage to the Greathead lifeboat went unrepaired, and it was found to be unavailable to assist with an 1821 wrecking. From about 1830, Dunbar was served by a Rocket Brigade using Mandy apparatus. It was not until 1864 that the town petitioned to a reinvigorated RNLI for a replacement boat.

On 1 October 1845, Lt. Sydenham Wylde, RN, along with five coastguard boatmen, set out to go to the aid of a fishing boat which had been wrecked. Their boat was also wrecked, and all six men were lost. The RNIPLS made donations to their families.

=== 1864 onwards ===
It was announced in the RNLI journal "The Lifeboat" of 2 October 1865, that the Institution had established a lifeboat station at Dunbar.

It is anticipated that the boat will be of great service to the fishing-boats of the place on occasions of storms, as well as to other vessels that may be wrecked in the locality. The life-boat will be available for a considerable length of coast, as there are sandy beaches, both north and south of Dunbar, with good roads leading to them, which will enable the boat to be readily transported thither on its carriage.

— The Life-boat, Vol. V, Issue. 58, 2 October 1865

A 33-foot (10 m) self-righting 'Pulling and Sailing' (P&S) lifeboat, one with sails and (10) oars, along with its carriage, was transported to Dunbar free of charge by the Great Northern, North Eastern, and North British Railway Companies, arriving in Dunbar in April 1864. A new boathouse was constructed by the Victoria Harbour, at a cost of £165. The lifeboat was funded by the gift of £300 from Lady Cuninghame-Fairlie, and at her request, the lifeboat was named Wallace.

In a strong northerly gale on 7 March 1877, the steamship James was seen drifting towards Belhaven. After much effort, both horses and men dragging the lifeboat out over soft sand, the lifeboat was launched, By now, the vessel had gone ashore, but the crew of four were rescued. The vessel broke up soon afterwards.

On 13 October 1877, the Dunbar lifeboat capsized whilst out on exercise. Two crewmen, R. Clements and Robert Harkes were lost.

Three men were brought ashore by the lifeboat on 27 February 1882, when the lighter Sophia, was seen displaying a signal of distress, whilst on passage to Dunbar from Newcastle-upon-Tyne with a cargo of coal. She was riding the sea at anchor, after her tugboat broke a shaft, and was set loose, but was in danger of being lost in the poor conditions.

In 1901, the first boathouse was demolished, and a new one constructed on the same site at Victoria harbour by Mr A. Gordon, at a cost of £633.

=== 1930s onwards ===
The first RNLI motor-powered lifeboat was stationed in Scotland in 1909, but it would be another 22 years before one was provided for Dunbar. The new 45-foot 6in Watson lifeboat, with twin 40-hp 'Weyburn CE4' petrol engines, was funded from the legacy of Mr. George Strachan of Glasgow, via the Glasgow branch of the RNLI. On 15 August 1931, a service of dedication was given by the Rev. William Brown, DD, of the Old Church, Dunbar, before the lifeboat was named George and Sarah Strachan (ON 749) by Miss Molly Strachan, a niece of the donor. At the same ceremony, RNLI Silver Medal recipient Walter Fairburn, who had been Coxswain for 34 years, was presented with the Institution's Certificate of Service, by the Countess of Haddington.

In 1964, in response to an increasing amount of water-based leisure activity, the RNLI placed 25 small fast Inshore lifeboats around the country. These were easily launched with just a few people, ideal to respond quickly to local emergencies. More Inshore lifeboats were deployed, and a D-class (RFD PB16) lifeboat (D-169) was placed at Dunbar in 1968. The boat was housed in the 1901 boathouse. It was extended and refurbished in 1996.

=== Sir Ronald Pechell, Bt. ===
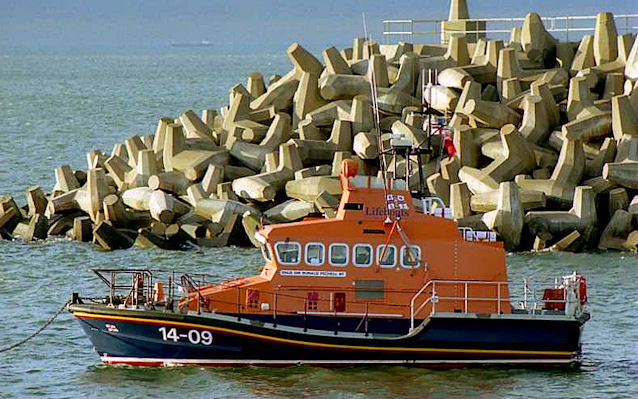
14-09 Sir Ronald Pechell Bt (ON 1207) at Torness

14-09 Sir Ronald Pechell, Bt. (ON 1207) was a Trent-class All-weather lifeboat that operated at Dunbar from 1995 to 2008. During the Easter weekend of 2008, the lifeboat was damaged beyond economic repair, after her moorings snapped during severe storms and she was driven ashore. The Sir Ronald Pechell Bt, valued at £208K in 2008, cost £1.05M to build in 1995 and in her 13 years of service at Dunbar had launched 206 times and rescued 171 people.

The Trent-class lifeboat, 14-35 John Neville Taylor (ON 1266) from the relief fleet, was allocated to the station as a permanent replacement.

== Skateraw lifeboat station ==
In 1907, to resolve the difficulties that were encountered transporting the Dunbar lifeboat overland, it was decided that a satellite lifeboat station be established at Skateraw, 5 miles (8.0 km) to the south-east of Dunbar. When required, the lifeboat would also be operated by the Dunbar crew. The station remained in service until 1943. For further information, please see:–

- Skateraw Lifeboat Station

== Station honours ==
The following are awards made at Dunbar:

- RNIPLS Silver Medal
  for the rescue of the master of the sloop Brothers, 4 March 1827
  Randal Stap, Chief Officer, H.M. Coastguard – 1827
  for the rescue of 4 from the sloop Peggy, 28 August 1830
  Lt. Charles Shaw, RN, H.M. Coastguard, Redheugh – 1830
  for rescuing the master and one of the crew of the schooner Susan, 9 January 1852.
  James Brown, Commissioned Boatman, H.M. Coastguard – 1852
  for rescuing the skipper and his nephew of the fishing yawl William and James, 28 February 1852.
  Robert Turnbull, fisherman – 1852
- RNLI Silver Medal
  for the rescue of six from the SS King Ja Ja of Swansea, 13 October 1905.
  Walter Fairbairn, Coxswain Superintendent – 1905
- RNLI Bronze Medal
  for the rescue an injured man in the water, 23 December 1970.
  David Brunton, crew member – 1970
  for the rescue of two people from their yacht Ouhm, 15 May 2009
  Gary Fairbairn, Coxswain – 2010
- 'The Thanks of the Institution inscribed on Vellum'
  for the rescue an injured man in the water, 23 December 1970.
  Jonathan J A Alston – 1970
  for his seamanship and leadership searching for divers, 6 October 1990
  Robert Wight, Coxswain – 1991
- 'A Framed Letters of Thanks signed by the Chairman of the Institution'
  for the rescue an injured man in the water, 23 December 1970.
  five crew members – 1970
- Lady Swaythling Trophy for outstanding seamanship 2010
  awarded by The Shipwrecked Fishermen and Mariners' Royal Benevolent Society
  for the rescue of two people from their yacht Ouhm, 15 May 2009
  Gary Fairbairn, Coxswain – 2010
- Testimonial on Parchment awarded by the Royal Humane Society
  for the rescue of a boy who had fallen over the cliffs.
  R. G. Brunton, Second Coxswain – 1953
- Letter of Appreciation from the German Government
  for the assistance given by the lifeboat to the S.S. Berkenan of Bremerhaven
  Dunbar Lifeboat – 1932
- British Empire Medal
  for services to Maritime Safety
  Kenneth John Headley, Fundraiser – 2015

== Roll of honour ==
In memory of those lost whilst serving Dunbar lifeboat.

- Lost on service to HMS Pallas when the lifeboat capsized, 18 December 1810
  B. Wilson
- All six coastguard men drowned when their boat wrecked, attempting a rescue of a fishing boat, 1 October 1845
  Lt. Sydenham Wylde, RN – 1845
  Wiiliam Clements – 1845
  David Davey – 1845
  Peter Davey – 1845
  Wiiliam Lucas – 1845
  Wiiliam Miller – 1845
- Lost when the lifeboat Wallace capsized on exercise, 13 October 1877
  R. Clements
  Robert Harkes (36)

== Dunbar lifeboats ==
=== Dunbar Harbour Authority ===
Name	Built	On station	Class	Comments
Dunbar Lifeboat or Lady Anne Murray	1808	1808–1821	Greathead	(Note: Non-self-righting lifeboat of unknown dimensions, gift of Lady Cuninghame-Fairlie of Dumbarton, built by Henry Greathead of South Shields, costing £372.); Unfit for service, 1821.

=== RNLI ===
==== Pulling and Sailing (P&S) lifeboats ====
ON (Note: ON is the RNLI's Official Number of the boat.)	Name	Built	On station	Class	Comments
220	Wallace	1865	1864–1893	33-foot Peake self-righting(P&S)	(Note: 33 ft 0 in (10.06 m) x 8 ft 0 in (2.44 m) (10-oared) Peake-class self-righting (P&S) lifeboat, gift of Lady Cuninghame-Fairlie of Dumbarton, built by Forrestt of Limehouse, London, costing £250.); Capsized 13 October 1877 with the loss of two crew. Broken up in 1893.
345	Sarah Pickard	1892	1893–1901	34-foot self-righting (P&S)	(Note: 34 ft 0 in (10.36 m) x 7 ft 6 in (2.29 m) (10-oared) self-righting (P&S) lifeboat, legacy of Mr A. Pickard of Ossett, Leeds, built by Chambers and Colby of Lowestoft, costing £455.); Damaged 1896. Transferred to Eyemouth.
443	William Arthur Millward	1900	1901–1931	35-foot Liverpool (P&S)	(Note: 35 ft 0 in (10.67 m) x 10 ft 0 in (3.05 m) (12-oared) Liverpool-class non-self-righting (P&S) lifeboat, legacy of Mr W. A. Millward of Chapel-en-le-Frith, built by Thames Ironworks of Blackwall, London, costing £879.); Sold in 1931.

==== Motor lifeboats ====
ON	Op.No. (Note: Op.No. is the RNLI's Operational Number of the boat carried on the hull.)	Name	Built	On station	Class	Comments
749	–	George and Sarah Strachan	1931	1931–1959	45-foot 6in Watson	Transferred to the Relief fleet. Later at Exmouth
947	–	Margaret	1959	1959–1986	47-foot Watson	
971	–	Joseph Soar (Civil Service No.34)	1963	1986–1988	47-foot Watson	Previously at St Davids. Transferred to Shoreham Harbour.
1020	48-015	Hugh William, Viscount Gough	1973	1988–1993	Solent	Previously at Stornoway and Barra Island.
1034	44-013	Thomas James King	1974	1993–1995	Waveney	Previously at St Helier.
1207	14-09	Sir Ronald Pechell Bt	1995	1995–2008	Trent	Storm-damaged beyond economic repair.
1204	14-06	Windsor Runner (Civil Service No.42)	1995	2008	Trent	Relief fleet lifeboat.
1266	14-35	John Neville Taylor	2002	2008–	Trent	

More post-service details can be found on the respective lifeboat class pages.

==== Inshore lifeboats ====
Op.No.	Name	On station	Class	Comments
D-169	Unnamed	1968–1983	D-class (RFD PB16)	
D-292	Castle House	1983–1989	D-class (RFD PB16)	
D-397	Banks' Staff III	1989–1999	D-class (EA16)	
D-544	The Hastings	1999–2009	D-class (EA16)	
D-708	Jimmy Miff	2009–2019	D-class (IB1)	
D-844	David Lauder	2019–	D-class (IB1)	

== See also ==
- List of RNLI stations
- List of former RNLI stations
- Royal National Lifeboat Institution lifeboats
