= Jane Hay =

Scottish philanthropist and campaigner (1864–1914)

Jane Hay (10 March 1864 - 26 January 1914) was a Scottish philanthropist and campaigner. She was elected to the Edinburgh Parish Council in 1895 and campaigned to improve the lives of poor children in the city.

== Early life ==
Jane Hay was born in Leith to James Hay (1799 - 1880), a merchant and Margaret Scott, a dressmaker. Her father was well known among the literary, artistic and legal circles of Edinburgh. She attended university in London.

== Philanthropy ==
As a member of the Edinburgh Parish Council, Hay campaigned for nurses for the children in the workhouse and so deeply moved by the plight of the children, she adopted six orphans. She then turned her attention to deserting fathers, convincing the council to hunt them down and send them to prison for not supporting their families. She served on the council for 7.5 years and also served for 3 years on the Edinburgh School Board.

As a result of her work, Hay gave lectures at the Normal School in Edinburgh on topics such as "Women's work in the world"

In 1896, Hay travelled to Athens where she established soup kitchens. Continuing on to Constantinople, she undertook relief work among Armenian refugees helping to support 100 women and children. A year later, she spent two months distributing blankets and relief to Greek Refugees at Euboea, who had been driven from their villages by Turkish invaders during the Greco-Turkish War. She also supervised the soup kitchens, ensuring that over 1000 people were fed each day. To encourage families, who had lost their livelihoods to become self-sufficient, Hay helped establish cotton looms for the refugee families at Chalcis. When small-pox broke out on the island of Euboea, Hay organised food for the sufferers, who were quarantined in a mosque on a neighbouring island. She also cleaned medical instruments and organised supplies of tinned milk for the island's babies. On her return to Athens she set up a School of Embroidery, whose work was put on sale at Liberty's department store in London.

Continuing with her aid work, Hay visited Russia in 1899, setting up a relief centre for the famine-stricken people of Kazan.

A keen supporter of the women's movement, Hay joined the National Suffrage Society and the Women's Social and Political Union.

== St Abbs ==
She moved to St Abbs where she helped establish the lifeboat station after witnessing the loss of the Danish Steamer Alfred Erlandsen with all its crew. She also set up a diving school and the 'Rocket Brigade' for children to learn life-saving techniques. She became friends with local suffragist and campaigner Isabel Cowe.

Hay set up a restaurant for fisher girls who came for the herring curing at Eyemouth and a recreation room at Coldingham.

She was involved in the Celtic Revival movement, being a good friend of Ella Carmichael and Margery Kennedy Fraser, and was a member of the Highland Association. She also one of the founding members of the Scottish American Society. She invited friends to lecture at the Church Literary Society including Antarctic explorer William Spiers Bruce and scientist and town planner Patrick Geddes.

After suffering from a breakdown in health, Hay travelled to Switzerland on the advice of her doctors. She died of an embolism at Monnetier-Mornex in France in 1914.
