= Isabel Cowe =

Scottish suffragist (1867 - 1931)

- Born: 1 December 1867; Coldingham, Berwickshire, Scottish Borders
- Died: 3 January 1931 (aged 63)
- Other names: "Provost of St Abbs"
- Occupation(s): suffragist, campaigner and boarding house owner.
- Organization(s): Women's Freedom League; Royal National Lifeboat Institution

Isabel Cowe (1 December 1867–3 January 1931) was a Scottish suffragist, campaigner for the local Royal National Lifeboat Institution (RNLI) and boarding house owner. She was nicknamed the "Provost of St Abbs".

== Early life ==
Cowe was born in Coldingham, Berwickshire, in the Scottish Borders, in 1867. Her father was a fisherman and her brother Robert died at sea in 1879. Extended family members working as mariners were also lost at sea as she grew up.

== St Abbs ==
Cowe owned the St Abbs Haven boarding house in Berwickshire from 1914 to 1931 and was a popular figure in the village. She campaigned and fundraised for St Abbs to have its own lifeboat and took part in the rescue of passengers and crew from the ship Glanmire when it floundered in Coldingham Bay. She was awarded a RLNI Gold Brooch for her bravery and campaigning.

== Suffrage activism ==
Cowe joined the Women's Freedom League (WFL), with her friend Jane Hay. Cowe was an organiser of the 400-mile Scottish Suffrage March from Edinburgh to Downing Street, London in October 1912, to present a petition for women's enfranchisement. The march followed the historic route of the Great North Road. During the march Cowe would often ride ahead on her bicycle to secure accommodation for the marchers and get signatures for the petition from people living in out of the way farms, hamlets and villages. She was one of six marchers who completed the entire journey, wore the suffrage colours of a white scarf and green hat on the march, and was arrested in Egham, Surrey, for cycling on a pavement.

== Later life and death ==
Cowe refused to pay taxes to her local council on one occasion in protest of its "ineffectiveness" and resisted bailiffs armed with a hatchet and fire extinguisher. She was also a supporter of the Children's League of Pity.

Cowe died on 3 January 1931 and a memorial garden was made in her honour at St Abbs, where her ashes were scattered and a marble-columned sundial was erected that was paid for by subscribers from across Britain.
