= RNLB Helen Smitton =

Watson-class lifeboat built in 1910

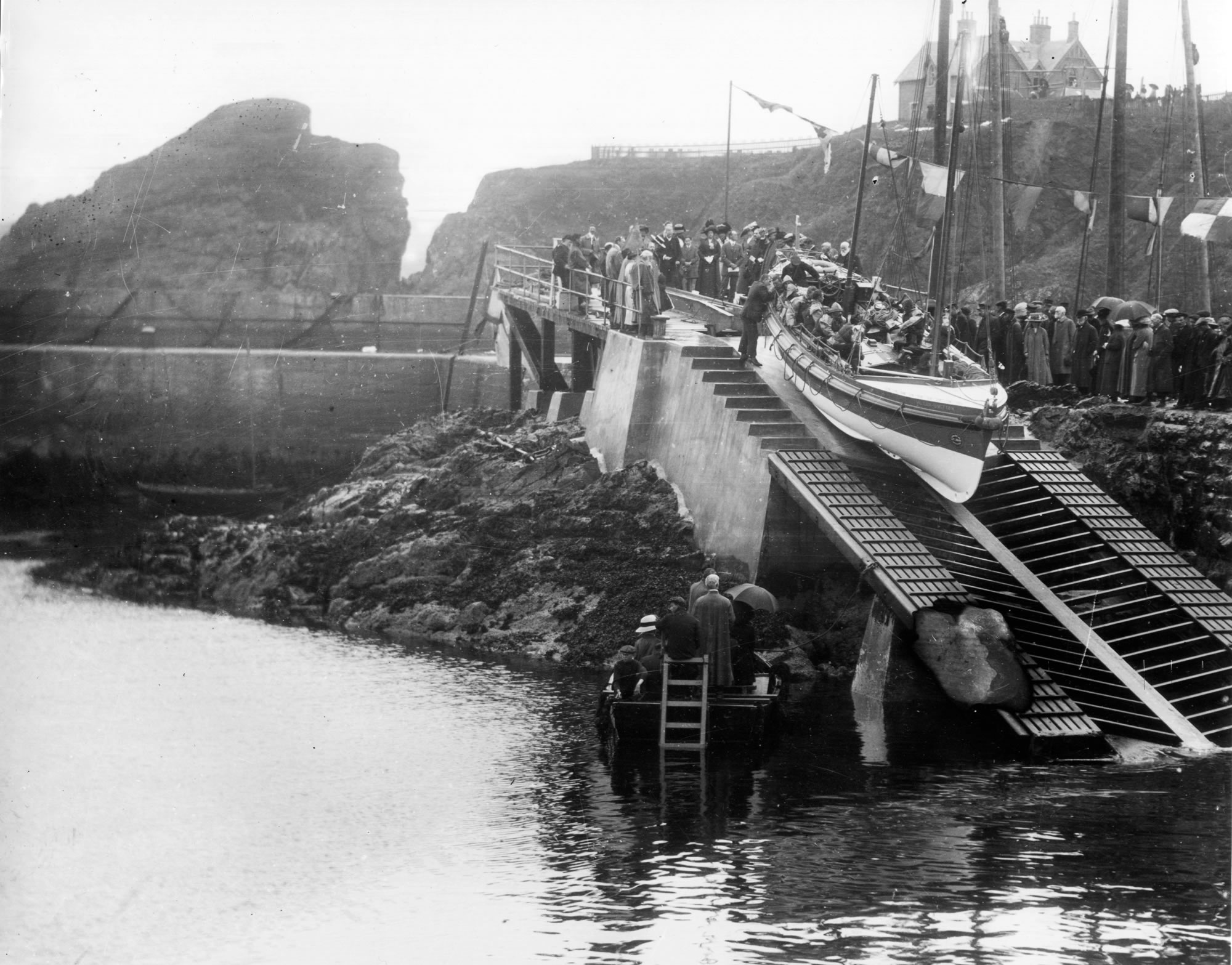
- Helen Smitton being launched at St Abbs, 1911

History

United Kingdom
- Name: Helen Smitton
- Builder: Thames Ironworks and Shipbuilding Company
- Sponsored by: James Hodge
- In service: 1911–1936
- Status: Under restoration
- Official Number: ON 603

General characteristics
- Class & type: Watson-class lifeboat
- Length: 37.97 ft (11.57 m)
- Beam: 10 ft (3.0 m)
- Propulsion: Primary Oar/Sail plus 37hp Wolseley petrol engine

RNLB Helen Smitton (ON 603) is a Watson-class lifeboat built by Thames Ironworks and Shipbuilding Company in 1910. Helen Smitton served as the lifeboat at St Abbs, Berwickshire, Scotland from 1911 to 1936 and was the village's first lifeboat.

== Design and construction ==
Helen Smitton is a non-self-righting, 38-ft Watson-class lifeboat constructed from Honduras mahogany on Canadian rock elm frames and stringers. Her floors are iron. A layer of calico coated with white lead paste sits between each layer of the hull. A 1.5 ton fixed iron ballast keel and a triangular drop keel that passes through the fixed keel are present. She was powered by a 37 hp Wolseley petrol engine. That engine is now missing.

== Preservation ==
Helen Smitton is undergoing preservation work at Marloes, Pembrokeshire, West Wales, having been reduced to little more than a bare hull in poor condition and with structural problems. 95% of her original wooden hull remains. She is listed on the National Register of Historic Vessels by National Historic Ships, with certificate number 2220.
