= St. Abbs and Eyemouth Voluntary Marine Reserve =

Coordinates: 55°53′57″N 2°07′46″W

St. Abbs and Eyemouth Voluntary Marine Reserve is a Voluntary Marine Reserve—the first established in the United Kingdom. Located in the Scottish Borders, it covers 8 kilometres of the Berwickshire coast, from Eyemouth in the south to St. Abb's Head in the north. At its centre is the fishing village of St. Abbs.

The reserve is one of the most popular scuba diving locations in the United Kingdom. The water of the reserve is unusually clear, in contrast to the more silt-laden coastal waters further to the north and south. The reserve was opened on 18 August 1984 by botanist and environmental campaigner David Bellamy.
