= Coldingham =

Village and parish in Scotland

Coordinates: 55.8833°N 2.1666°W

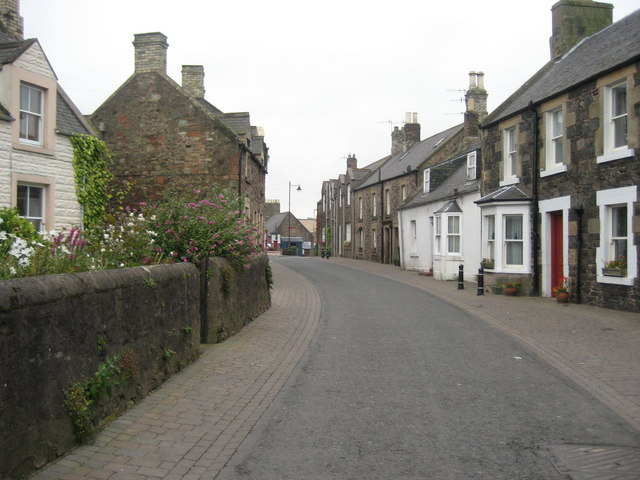
- Coldingham High Street

- Location within the Scottish Borders
- Population: 500 (2020)
- OS grid reference: NT905665
- Council area: Scottish Borders
- Lieutenancy area: Berwickshire
- Country: Scotland
- Sovereign state: United Kingdom
- Post town: EYEMOUTH
- Postcode district: TD14
- Dialling code: 01890
- Police: Scotland
- Fire: Scottish
- Ambulance: Scottish
- UK Parliament: Berwickshire, Roxburgh and Selkirk
- Scottish Parliament: Ettrick, Roxburgh and Berwickshire

Coldingham is a village and parish in Berwickshire in the Scottish Borders. It lies a short distance inland from Coldingham Bay, three miles northeast of the fishing village of Eyemouth.

== Parish ==
The parish lies in the east of the Lammermuir district. It is the second-largest civil parish by area in Berwickshire county, after Lauder. It is bounded on the north-west by the North Sea, on the east by the parish of Eyemouth, on the south-east by Ayton on the south by Chirnside and Bunkle, on the west by Abbey St Bathans and on the north by Cockburnspath.

Besides the village of Coldingham, the parish contains the villages of:

- St Abbs (formerly Coldingham Shore)
- Reston
- Auchencrow
- Grantshouse

The civil parish is divided between the Community Council areas of Coldingham, St Abbs, Reston and Auchencrow, and Grantshouse. It was included in the former Berwickshire District of Borders Region, by the Local Government (Scotland) Act 1973, from 1975 to 1996.

Parish of Coldingham (part formerly in Oldhamstocks shown in green)

Before the Reformation, a vaguely defined jurisdiction known as Coldinghamshire was linked to Coldingham Priory and extended along the east coast of Berwickshire. By the 15th century, there is some indication that the civil administration was gradually attaining paramount sway with the consent of the Church itself. In 1406, the lordship of the Priory was held by Archibald, Earl of Douglas. In 1414, the Prior and Chapter of Durham (the ecclesiastical superiors of the priory) signed a deed constituting the Earl of Douglas "sovereign bailie" and governor of the house and barony of Coldingham. The barony of Coldingham, which included Eyemouth and other areas adjacent to the parish of Coldingham, continued as a jurisdiction into the 17th and 18th centuries.

Because of the size of the parish, an additional chapel was set up for the interior or western part of the parish in 1794. With the opening of a new trunk road in the area (now the A1) in 1816, communications between Grantshouse and Reston were so improved, it was decided in 1836 to erect a church midway between the villages, at Houndwood. Houndwood was made an ecclesiastical parish for the western part of Coldingham in 1851. This parish is now linked to Ayton and is served by places of worship at Reston (formerly a free church) and Grantshouse. The church became a crematorium in 2015.

A Parochial Board was established under the Poor Law (Scotland) Act 1845. With the Local Government (Scotland) Act 1894, Coldingham Parish Council was established, and it carried out poor relief and various public works, such as the acquisition and improvement of Houndwood cemetery in 1901. Civil parishes in Scotland, as units of local government, were abolished in 1929 but have been used later for census and other purposes.

In 1891 a Boundary Commission transferred a detached portion of Oldhamstocks parish, namely Butterdean, to Coldingham. It was already in Berwickshire, despite its mother parish being in East Lothian.

The civil parish has an area of 25,379 acres (10,271 ha) and a population of 1,919 (in 2011).

== Village ==
The settlement of Coldingham has a population of 563 (in 2011).

Nearby Coldingham Bay has a sandy secluded beach popular with surfers, with rows of beach huts.

== Monastery ==
There was a monastery of high order on this site as early as AD 660 when it is recorded that Etheldreda, the queen of Egfrid, became a nun at the Monastery of Coldingham, then under the management of Æbbe, the Elder, aunt of her husband. Bede describes it as "the Monastery of Virgins" and states that in 679, the monastery burnt down. It was rebuilt but was again destroyed by fire at the hands of a raiding party of Danes in 870. This time the ruins were not rebuilt, it would appear, until 1098, when King Edgar founded the Priory of Coldingham in honour of St. Cuthbert of Lindisfarne. It became the caput for the Barony of Coldingham, with the prior as the feudal lord.

The priory continued in its religious purposes until 1560, when it was partially destroyed during the Scottish Reformation. However, a portion of it continued its religious activities until 1650, when it was fortified against Oliver Cromwell. After a siege of two days, the main tower in which the besieged defended themselves was so shattered by artillery that they were forced to capitulate. This great tower of the original priory finally collapsed about 1777. The ruins of about 40% of the original priory church were rebuilt in 1855; it is today used as the parish church and is the most notable building in the parish.

== People from Coldingham ==
- Isabel Cowe (1867–1931), suffragist, campaigner for the local Royal National Lifeboat Institution (RNLI) and boarding house owner
- Dr. Michael Fenty, author, playwright and retired general practitioner

== Gallery ==
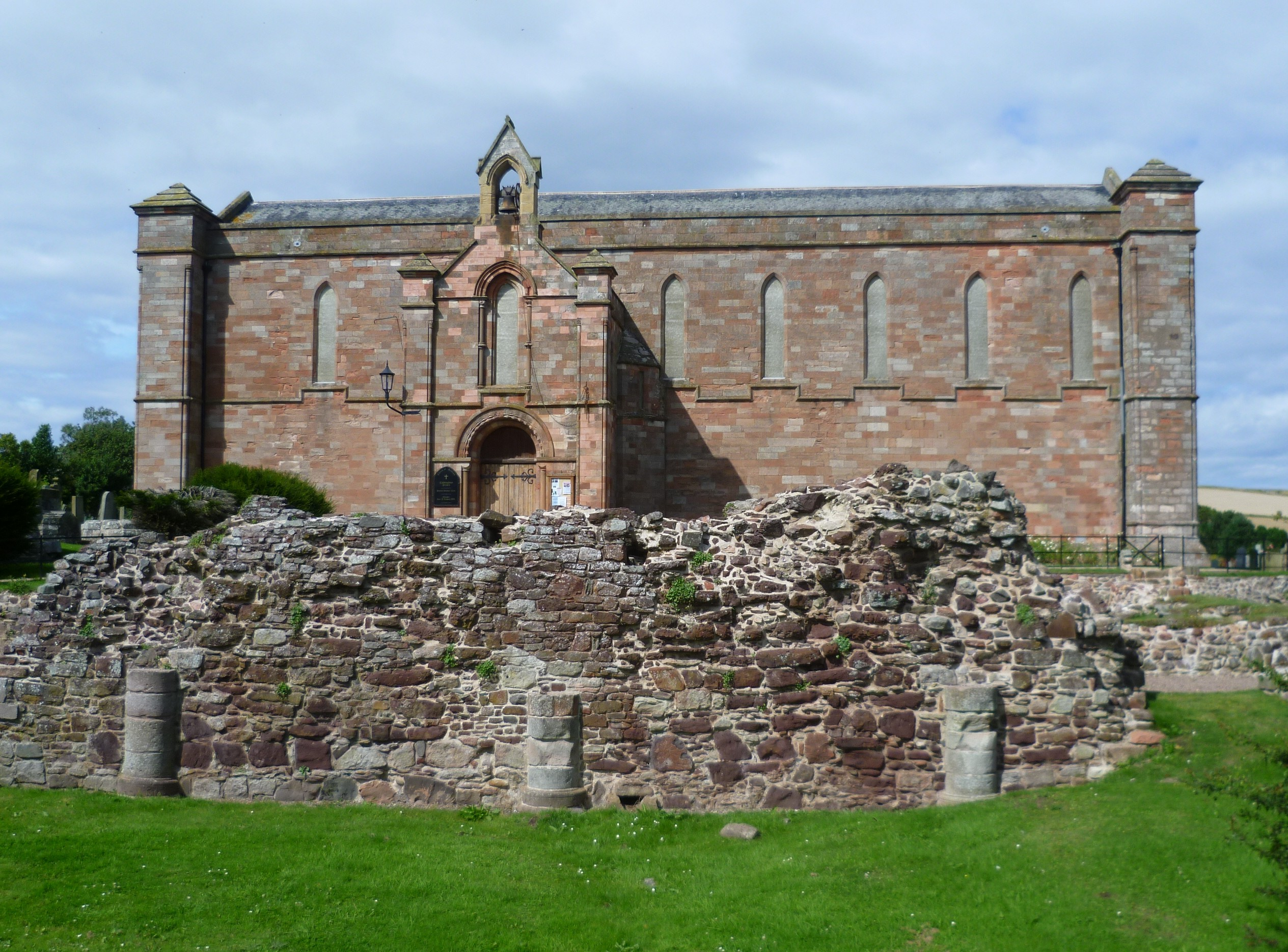
The parish church built using stones from the priory

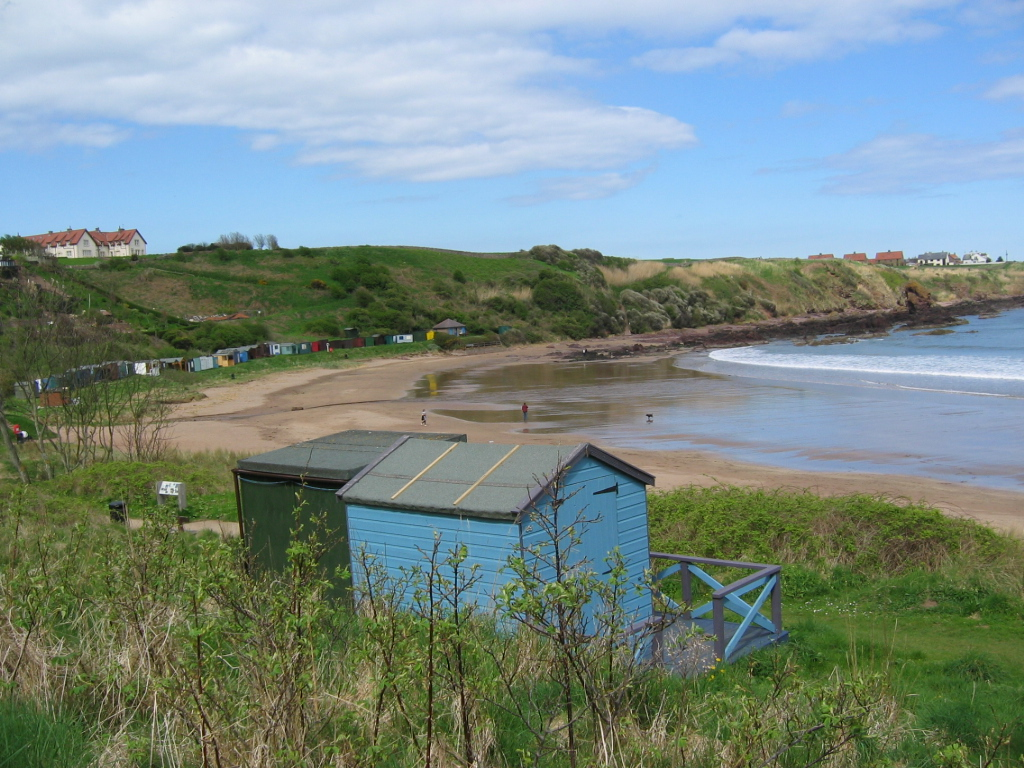
Beach huts at Coldingham Sands

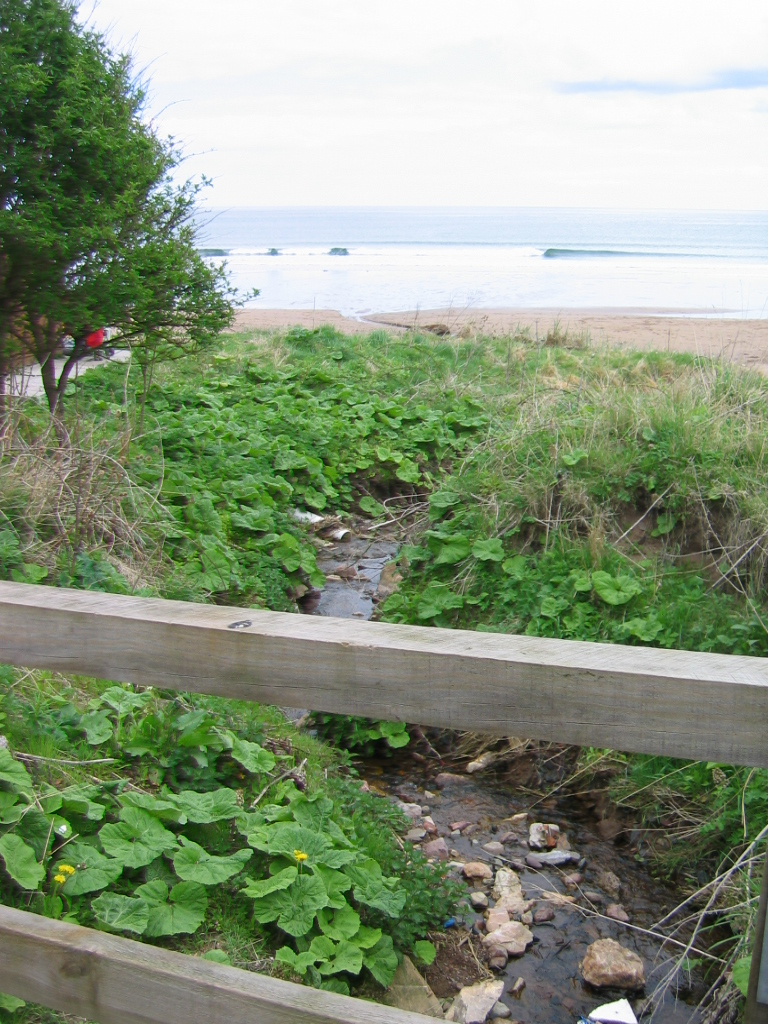
Stream from the Spout, Coldingham Sands

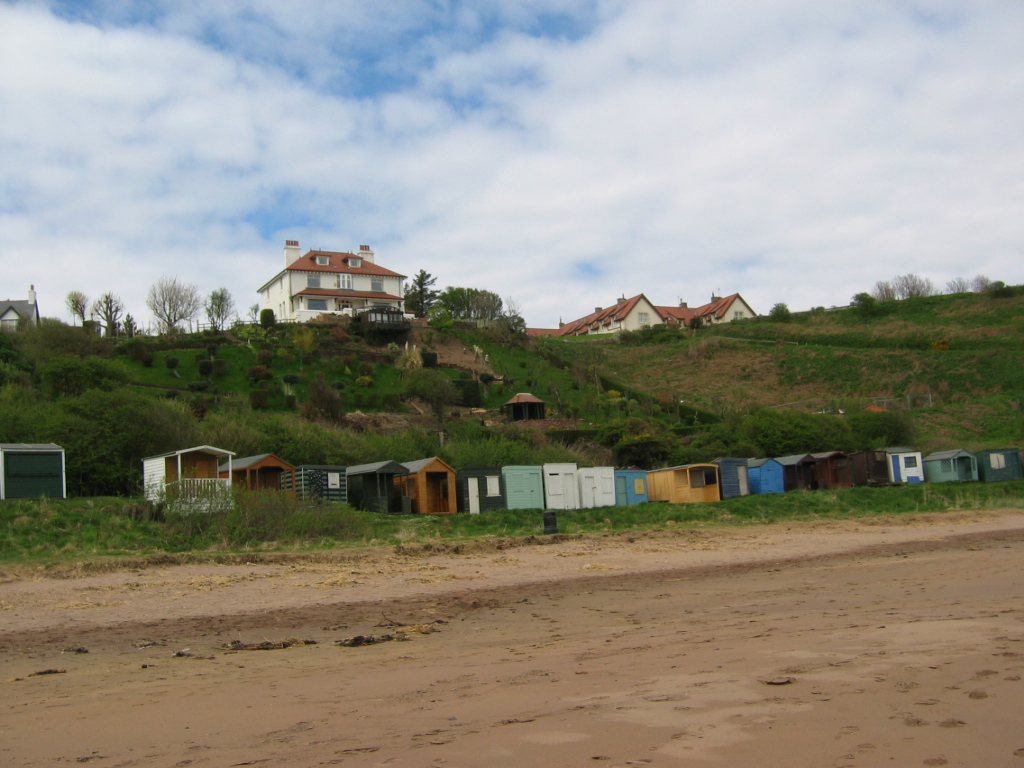
Coldingham Sands beach huts

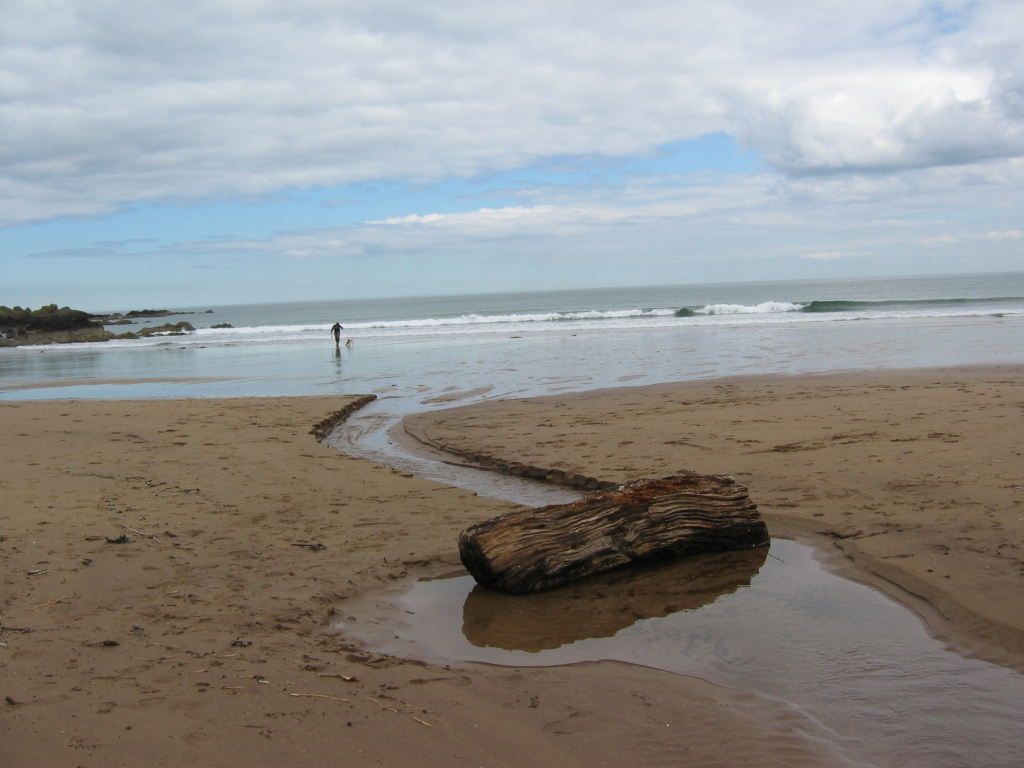
Coldingham Sands

== See also ==
- List of places in the Scottish Borders
- List of places in East Lothian
- List of places in Edinburgh
- List of places in Midlothian
- List of places in West Lothian
- List of places in Scotland
- Coldingham Priory
- Coldingham Bay
- Prior of Coldingham
- Prior of Durham
