= Skateraw (East Lothian) =

Hamlet in East Lothian, Scotland

Coordinates: 55.968470°N 2.427748°W

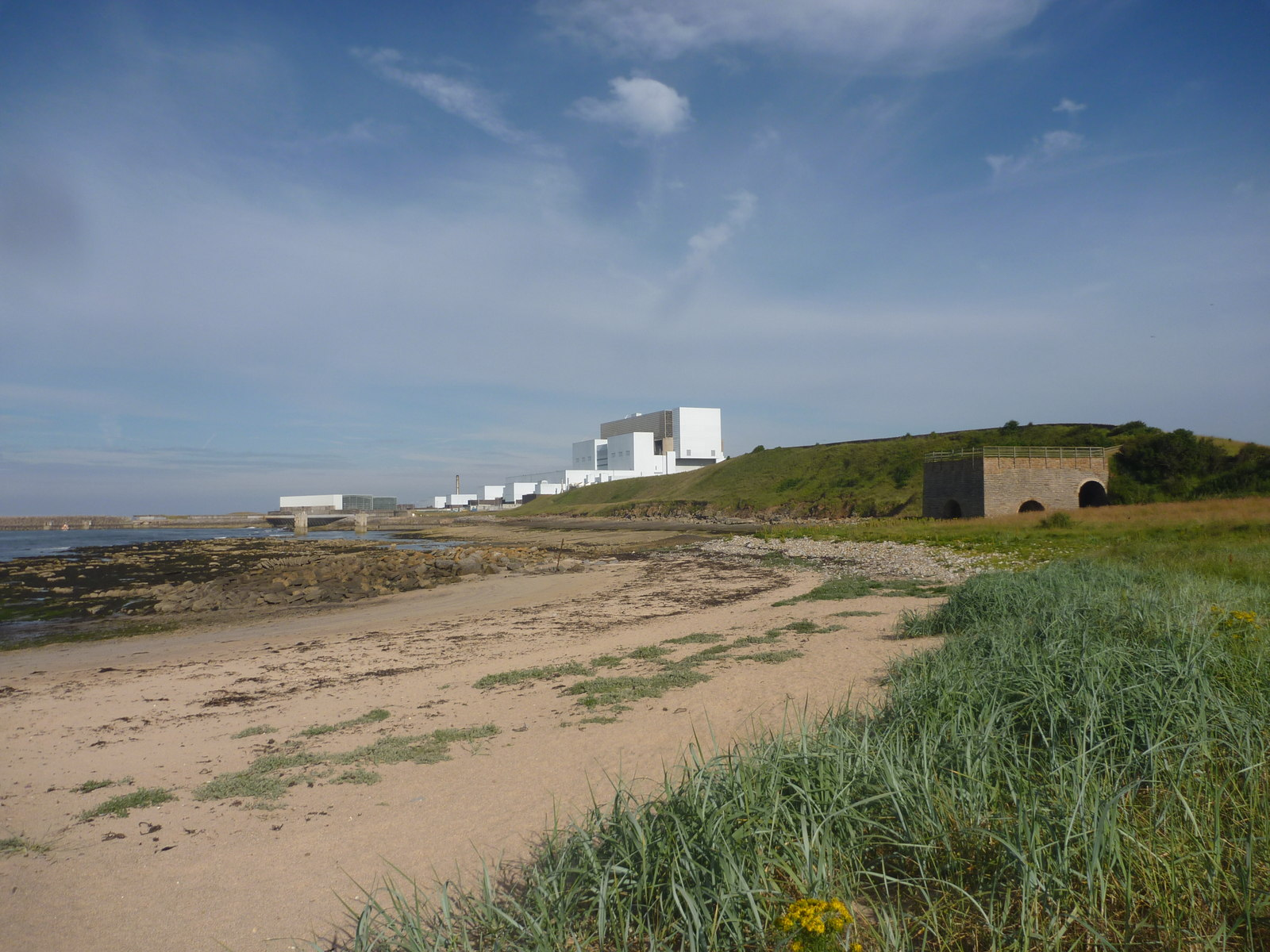
Skateraw Harbour

Skateraw is a hamlet in East Lothian, Scotland, in the parish of Innerwick, three miles southwest of Dunbar. It lies a short way inland from Skateraw Harbour, a sandy bay overlooked by Torness nuclear power station. The John Muir Link runs by Skateraw, passing along the seawall protecting the power station. There is a car park and public toilets near the beach, open from May to September.

== Skateraw House ==
Skateraw house is a B-listed six-bedroom Georgian farmhouse. Robert Burns mentions visiting Skateraw House in his Border journals, although the current house postdates his visit.

== World War I airfield and the war memorial ==
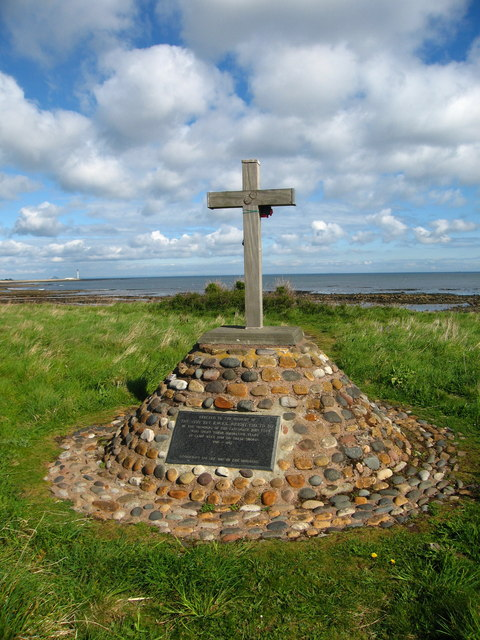
Memorial at Chapel Point, Skateraw

The area was home to a military aerodrome during the First World War. This was manned by No. 77 Squadron of the Royal Flying Corps, later the Royal Air Force, which operated Royal Aircraft Factory B.E.2 and B.E.12 aeroplanes. The airfield opened in 1917 and closed in 1919. There is a commentating plaque on the site, unveiled on 11 November 2018.

In the 1930s, the minister of the Canongate Kirk in Edinburgh, the Reverend Ronald Selby Wright, ran a club for poor boys living in the parish. He frequently took them camping at Skateraw. A cross near the ruins at Skateraw is a memorial to six of these boys who were killed in World War II.

== Natural history ==
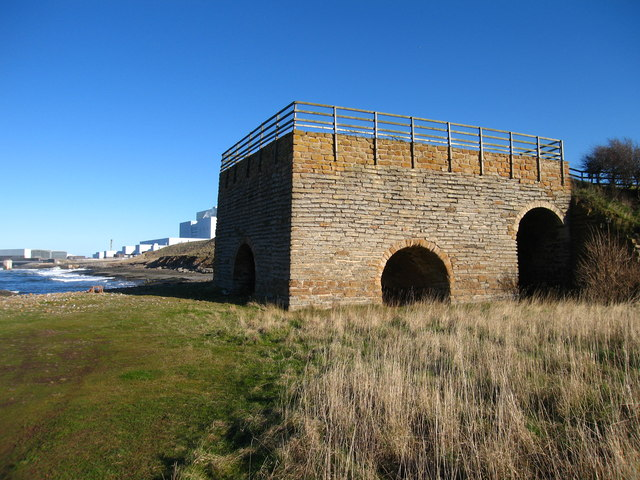
Old lime kiln at Skateraw Harbour

Skateraw is located in an area which has rich limestone deposits, currently being exploited by the nearby Lafarge Cement Works at Whitesands. Extraction of lime has been conducted in this area for hundreds of years. There are limekilns dating from the 18th century at the eastern end of the harbour. The calcareous rock also explains some of the botanical interest in this site, as the lime-rich rock favours plants which prefer an alkaline soil. Any plants living here must also be able to tolerate some salinity as these coastal grasslands can be subject to regular onshore gales from the North Sea. These factors lead to a specific habitat and there are several species which are unique to this area within East Lothian, such as autumn gentian, white horehound and yellow-horned poppy. The site is also a favoured site for birdwatchers looking for rare and scarce migrant birds in the spring and autumn.

== See also ==
List of places in East Lothian
