= Eyemouth Lifeboat Station =

RNLI lifeboat station in Scottish Borders, Scotland

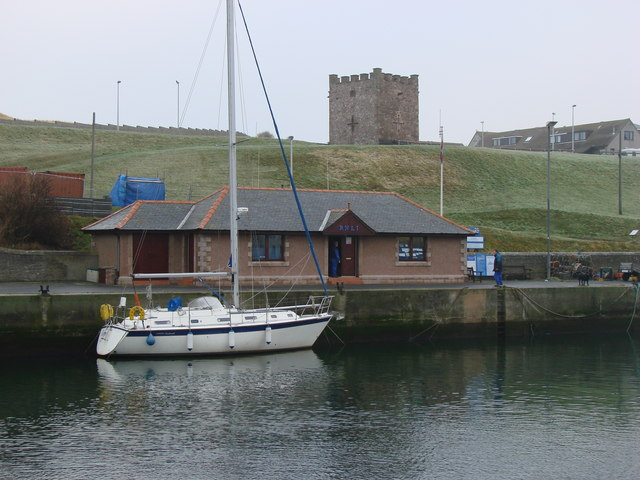
- Eyemouth Lifeboat Station

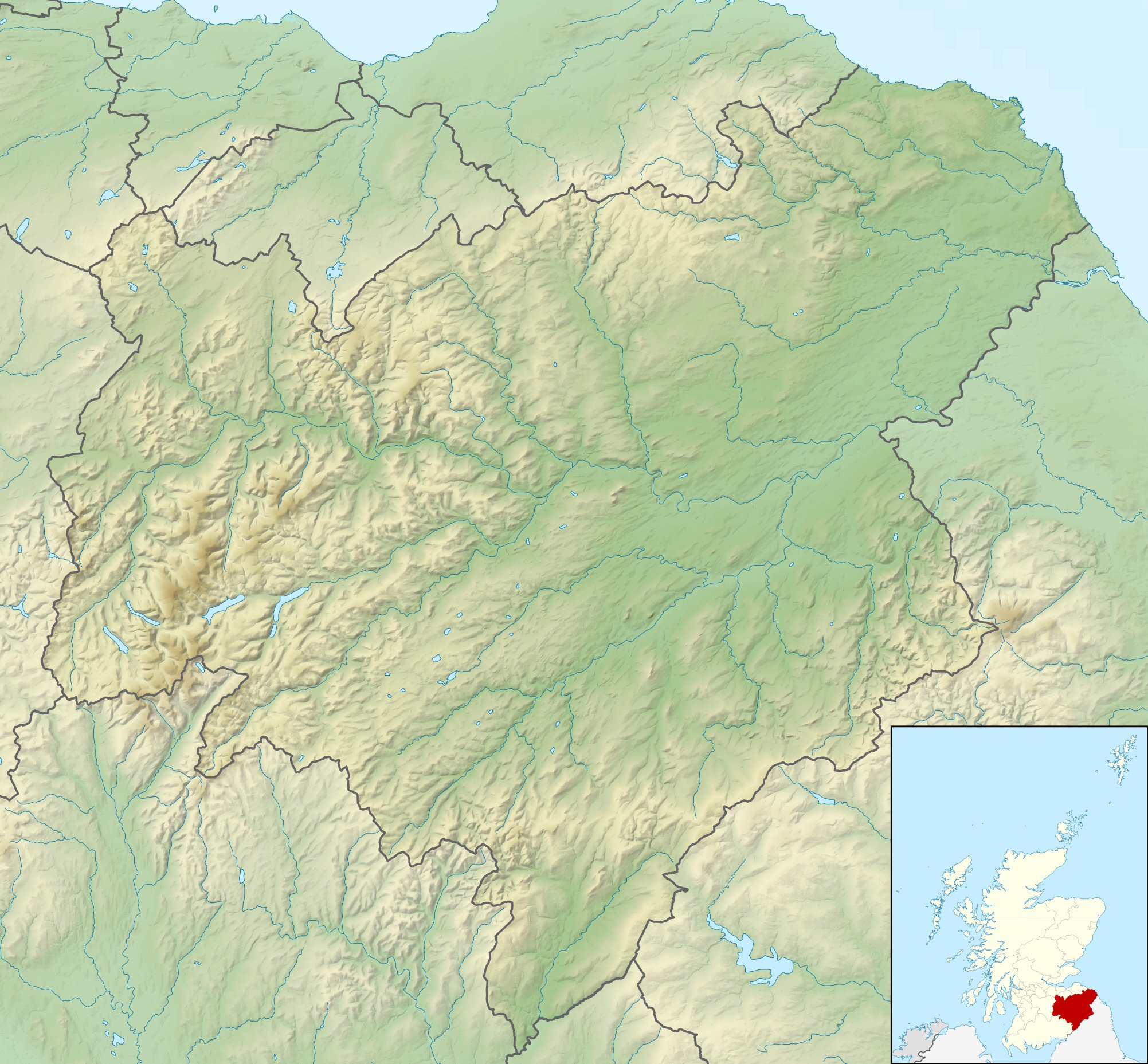
- Location within Scottish Borders

General information
- Type: RNLI Lifeboat Station
- Location: Gunsgreen Quay, Eyemouth, Berwickshire, Scotland, TD14 5SD, United Kingdom
- Coordinates: 55°52′20″N 2°5′10″W
- Opened: 1876
- Owner: Royal National Lifeboat Institution

Website
- Eyemouth RNLI Lifeboat Station

Eyemouth Lifeboat Station is located at Gunsgreen Quay in Eyemouth, a harbour town in the Scottish Borders, approximately 9 miles (14 km) north of Berwick-upon-Tweed, on the south-east coast of Scotland.

A lifeboat was first stationed at Eyemouth in 1876 by the Royal National Lifeboat Institution (RNLI).

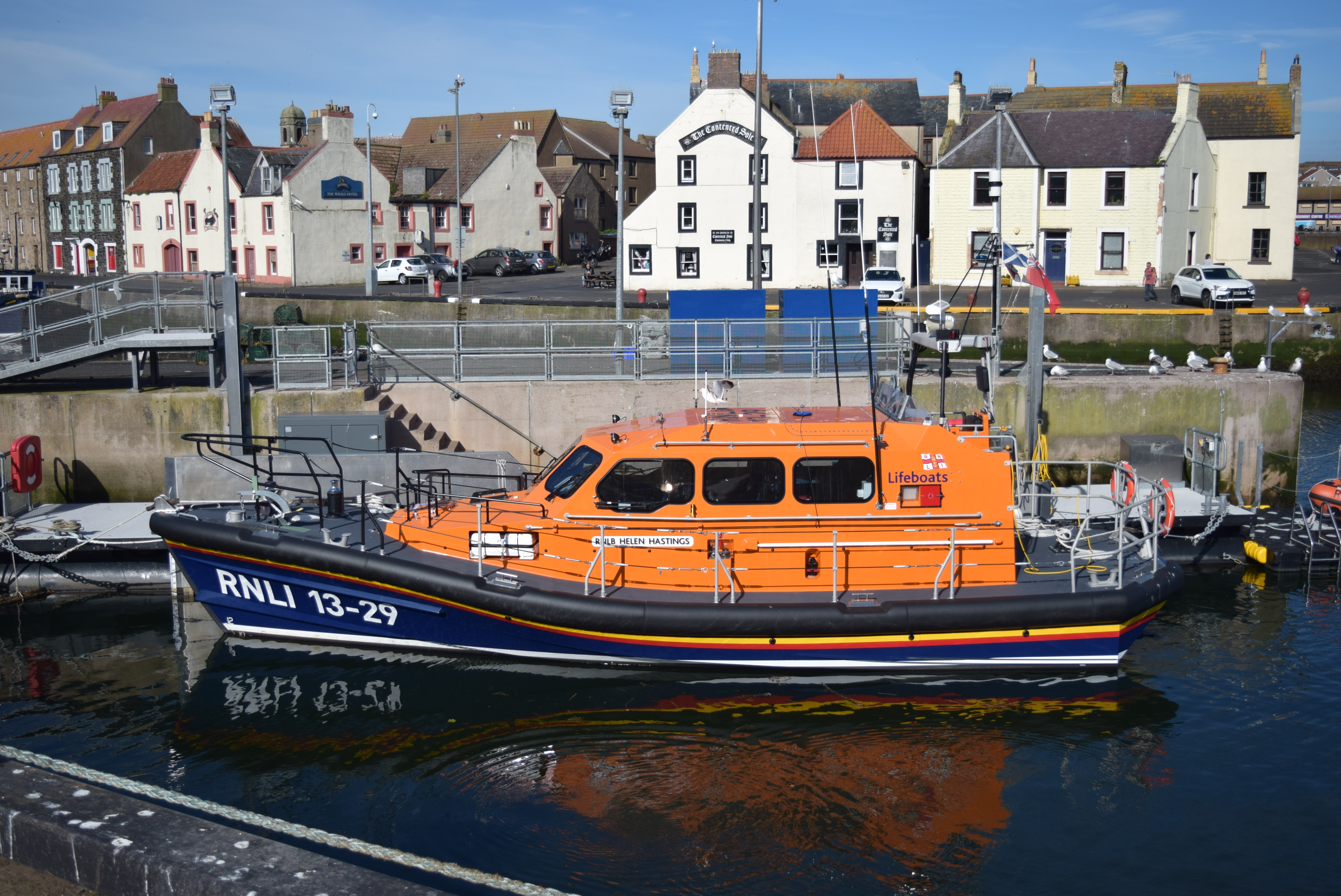
Shannon-class All-weather lifeboat 13-29 Helen Hastings (ON 1335)

The station currently operates a Shannon-class All-weather lifeboat 13-29 Helen Hastings (ON 1336), on station since 2018, and a D-class (IB1) Inshore lifeboat Sheila (D-877), since 2023.

== History ==
In December 1875, the town was visited by Capt. Gray-Jones, RNLI Assistant Inspector of Lifeboats, to assess the viability of a lifeboat placed here. With over 350 fishermen, there was an obvious case for a lifeboat, and a shortage of crew unlikely. A station was agreed.

An order was placed with Woolfe of Shadwell for a 30 ft (9.1 m) self-righting 'pulling and sailing' (P&S) lifeboat, one with sails and eight oars, at a cost of £275. A launch carriage from Napton & Co. cost an extra £117-5s-0d. A boathouse was constructed by Mr. J. Berry along the East Pier, along with a launchway, costing £517-10s-0d. Having been transported by rail from London to Burnmouth, the lifeboat and carriage were hauled by six horses through the town on 10 October 1876, to a ceremony at the beach, where the boat was named James & Rachel Grindlay by Mrs Grindlay, the boat being funded from the legacy of Mr. T Grindley of Edinburgh.

A new boathouse was constructed in 1908, next to the old boathouse, but set 90° to face the river. Along with a new launchway, the total cost was £998-4s-11d. It was able to accommodate a slightly larger boat, the 35 ft (11 m) Anne Francis (ON 592).

The Anne Francis was launched on 6 March 1917 to the aid of the schooner Livlig of Norway, wrecked off St Abb's Head, One crewman had been lost, with the seven remaining crew clinging to the rigging. With considerable skill in violent seas, Coxswain William Miller got the lifeboat alongside, and the seven men were rescued. Considering the conditions, the lifeboat then made the long journey around to Granton, Edinburgh to find safe harbour. Coxswain Miller was awarded the RNLI Bronze Medal.

Eyemouth would get a motor-powered lifeboat in 1937. A Liverpool-class lifeboat, costing £3,835, with a top speed of 7.66 knots (14.19 km/h; 8.81 mph). At a ceremony on 21 Aug 1937, the boat was named Frank and William Oates (ON 795), the donor being their third brother Charles George Oates of Leeds. Frank Oates (1840–1875) was a British naturalist, and along with his brother William, had explored Africa. All three brothers were uncles to Capt. Lawrence Oates of the Scott Antarctic Terra Nova Expedition of 1910.

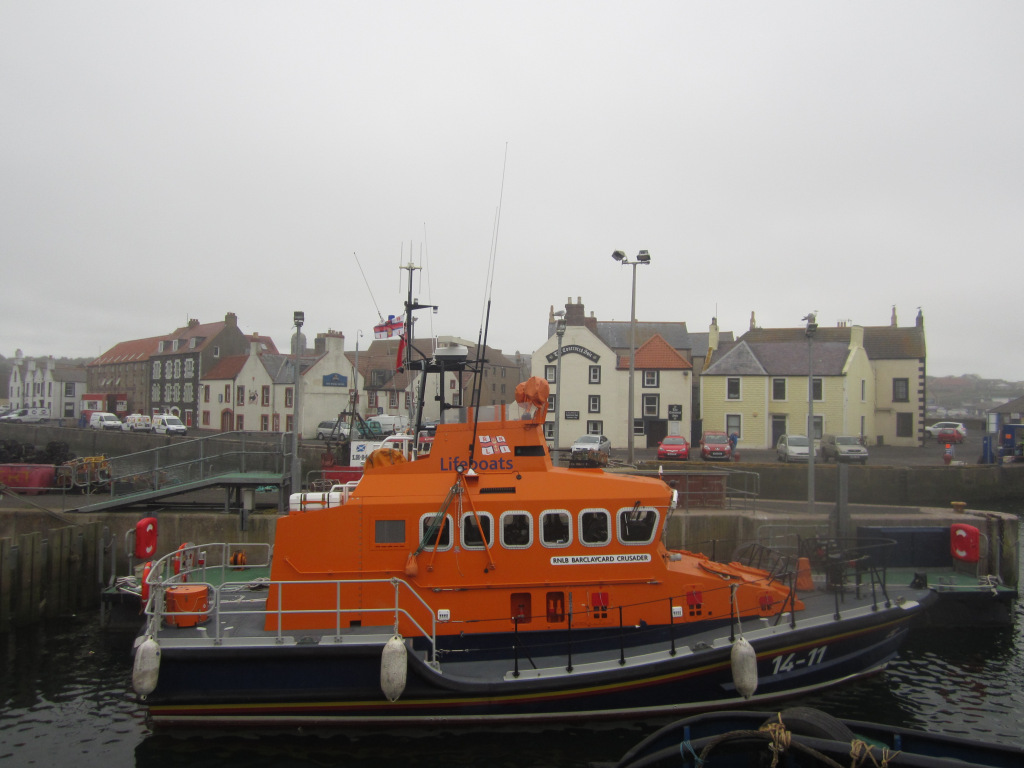
Trent-class lifeboat 14-11 Barclaycard Crusader at Eyemouth

Harbour works in 1963 would require the demolition of the lifeboat launchway. The station was closed temporarily, and the Clara and Emily Barwell (ON 893) was withdrawn. Replaced in 1964 by a larger 46ft Watson-class lifeboat, Swn-Y-Mor (Civil Service No.6), the Eyemouth lifeboats have since been moored afloat.

A new single-story station building was constructed on Gunsgreen Quay in 1992, followed by the arrival in 1996 of a new Trent-class lifeboat 14-11 Barclaycard Crusader (ON 1209), a 25-knot boat, costing £1,060,000. A new £107,000 pontoon berth was constructed in 2008, and a D-class (IB1) Inshore lifeboat was also placed on station in 2015.

In 2018, the Trent-class lifeboat was withdrawn to the relief fleet, and Eyemouth would receive a £2.2 million Shannon-class lifeboat, 13-29 Helen Hastings (ON 1336).

== Station honours ==
The following are awards made at Eyemouth.

- RNLI Silver Medal
  For the rescue of two skin-divers north west of Ebb Carr Rocks on 6 October 1990
  James A. Dougal, Acting Coxswain/Assistant Mechanic – 1991
- RNLI Bronze Medal
  For the rescue of 7 men of the Norwegian steamer Livlig on 6 March 1917
  William Miller, Coxswain – 1917
- The Maud Smith Award 1990
  (awarded for the bravest act of lifesaving during the year by a member of a lifeboat crew)
  For the rescue of two skin-divers north west of Ebb Carr Rocks on 6 October 1990
  James A. Dougal, Acting Coxswain/Assistant Mechanic – 1991
- The Thanks of the Institution inscribed on Vellum
  For the rescue of two skin-divers north west of Ebb Carr Rocks on 6 October 1990
  John Buchan, crewman – 1991
  David Collin, crewman – 1991
  George Walker, crewman – 1991
  Joseph Walker, crewman – 1991
  Robert Walker, crewman – 1991
  Alister Crombie, crewman – 1991
  For the rescue of three crew of the launch Norman Forster on 17 October 1992
  John Johnston, Coxswain – 1993
- 'A Framed Letter of Thanks signed by the Chairman of the Institution'
  For the rescue of three lives of the trawler Hatcliffe on 25 March 1983
  A. Dougal, Coxswain – 1983
  J. Aitchison, Second Coxswain – 1983
  J. Tarvit, Second Coxswain/Mechanic – 1983
  J. Dougal, Acting Assistant Mechanic – 1983
  A. Redden, crew member – 1983
  J. Buchan, crew member – 1983
  J. Purves, crew member – 1983
  I. Dougal, crew member – 1983
- Member, Order of the British Empire (MBE)
  John Duncan Johnston, former Coxswain – 2007NYH

== Eyemouth lifeboats ==
=== Pulling and Sailing (P&S) lifeboats ===
ON (Note: ON is the RNLI's Official Number of the boat.)	Name	Built	On station	Class	Comments
Pre-616	James & Rachel Grindlay	1876	1876–1888	30-foot Montrose self-righting (P&S)	(Note: 30 ft 0 in (9.14 m) x 8 ft 0 in (2.44 m) (8-oared) Montrose-class self-righting (P&S) lifeboat, legacy of Mr T. Grindlay of Edinburgh, built by Woolfe of Shadwell, London, costing £275.); Capsized 1880. Sold in 1896.
157	James & Rachel Grindlay	1887	1888–1901	34-foot self-righting (P&S)	(Note: 34 ft 0 in (10.36 m) x 7 ft 6 in (2.29 m) (10-oared) self-righting (P&S) lifeboat, legacy of Mr T. Grindlay of Edinburgh, built by Watkins of Blackwall, London, costing £362.); Broken up at the station in March 1901.
345	Sarah Pickard	1892	1901–1909	34-foot self-righting (P&S)	(Note: 34 ft 0 in (10.36 m) x 7 ft 6 in (2.29 m) (10-oared) self-righting (P&S) lifeboat, legacy of Mr A Pickard of Ossett, Leeds, built by Chambers and Colby of Lowestoft, costing £455.); Previously at Dunbar. Sold in 1909.
592	Anne Frances	1909	1909–1937	35-foot self-righting (P&S)	(Note: 35 ft 0 in (10.67 m) x 8 ft 6 in (2.59 m) (10-oared) self-righting (P&S) lifeboat, an anonymous gift via Miss Elizabeth Enderby, built by Thames Ironworks of Blackwall, London, costing £828.); Sold in 1937.

Pre ON numbers are unofficial numbers used by the Lifeboat Enthusiasts' Society to reference early lifeboats not included on the official RNLI list.

=== All-weather lifeboats ===
ON	Op.No. (Note: Op.No. is the RNLI's Operational Number of the boat or vehicle carried on the hull.)	Name	Built	On station	Class	Comments
795	–	Frank & William Oates	1937	1937–1951	Liverpool	Transferred to Girvan.
893	–	Clara and Emily Barwell	1951	1951–1963	Liverpool	
Station Closed 1963–1964 due to Harbour reconstruction works
784	–	Swn-Y-Mor (Civil Service No.6)	1936	1964–1967	46-foot Watson	Previously at St Davids.
820	–	Louise Stephens	1939	1967–1974	46-foot Watson	Previously at Great Yarmouth and Gorleston.
1026	44-008	Eric Seal (Civil Service No.36)	1974	1974–1996	Waveney	
1209	14-11	Barclaycard Crusader	1995	1996–2019	Trent	
1336	13-29	Helen Hastings	2018	2018–	Shannon	

More post-service details can be found on the respective lifeboat class pages.

=== Inshore lifeboats ===
Op.No.	Name	On station	Class	Comments
D-745	MyWay	2015–2023	D-class (IB1)	
D-877	Sheila	2023–	D-class (IB1)	

=== Launch and recovery tractors ===
Op.No.	Reg. No.	Type	On station	Comments
T52	KXT 420	Case LA	1949–1958	
T46	KGP 1	Case LA	1958–1963	

== See also ==
- List of RNLI stations
- List of former RNLI stations
- Royal National Lifeboat Institution lifeboats

== Sources ==
- Leonard, Richie; Denton, Tony (2025). Lifeboat Enthusiasts Handbook 2025. Lifeboats Enthusiasts' Society.
- Leonard, Richie; Denton, Tony (2026). Lifeboat Enthusiasts Handbook 2026. Lifeboats Enthusiasts' Society.
