= St Abbs =

Village in Berwickshire, Scotland

Coordinates: 55.898°N 2.131°W

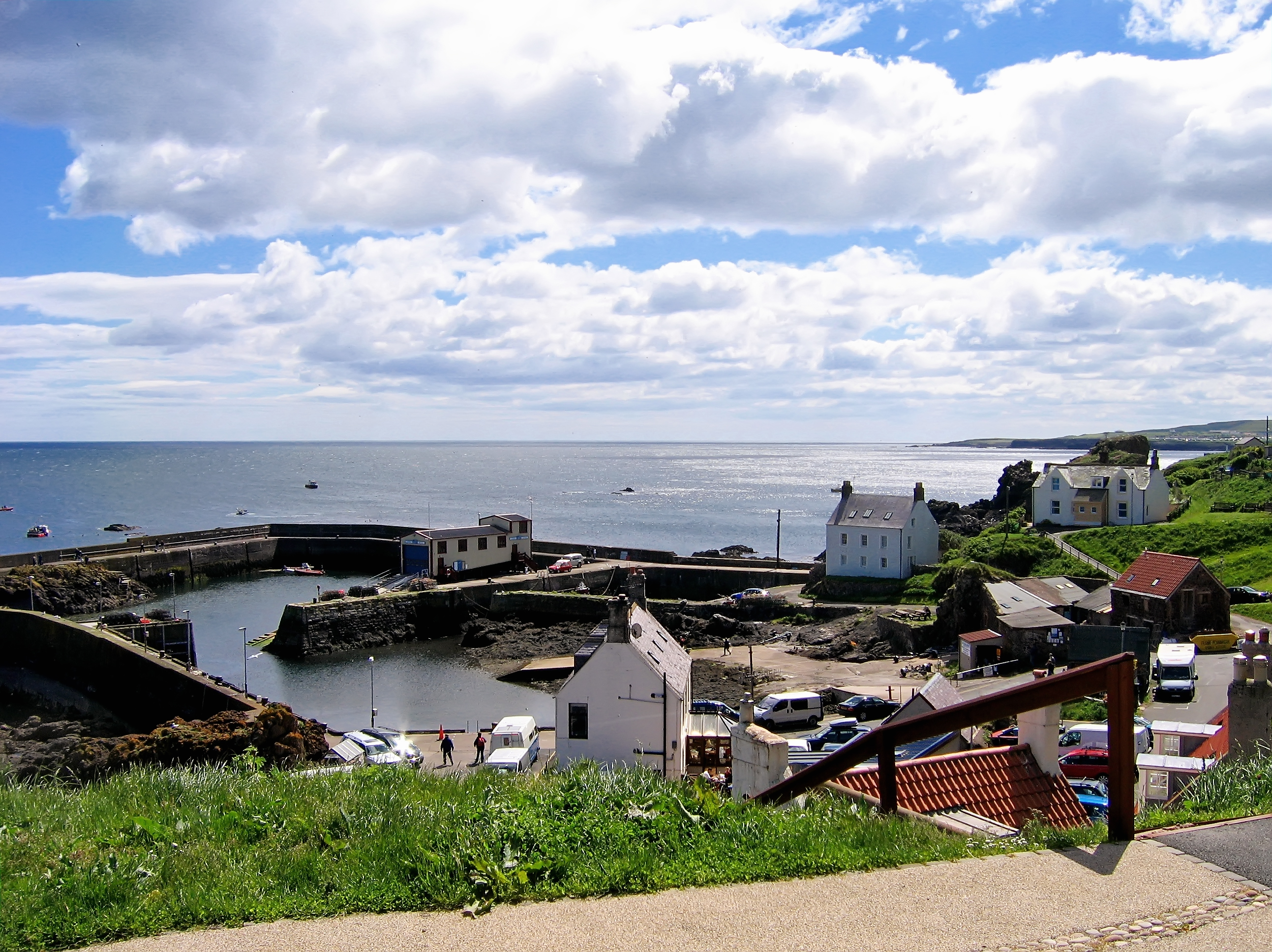
St Abbs harbour as seen from the coastal path.

St Abbs is a small fishing village on the southeastern coast of Scotland, within the Coldingham parish of Scottish Borders.

The village was originally known as Coldingham Shore, the name St Abbs being adopted in the 1890s. The new name was derived from St Abb's Head, a rocky promontory located to the north of the village, itself named after the 7th-century saint Æbbe of Coldingham.

== History ==
St Abbs Lifeboat the Thomas Tunnock is based in St Abbs

St Abbs was originally called Coldingham Shore. Prior to any buildings the fishermen who worked their boats from the beach resided at Fisher's Brae in Coldingham. These fishermen had to carry their fishing gear one and a half miles down a path to where their fishing vessels were tied up. The path is now known as the Creel Path; creel is the local name for a lobster pot.

The first building in St Abbs was constructed in about the middle of the 18th century followed later by a row of five cottages. This first row of houses was constructed in a traditional Scottish style with a central fire and a wide chimney. The walls were constructed of "clat and clay," a framework of wood interlaced with straw and daubed with moist clay.

By 1832 it is recorded that the inhabitants of the Shore comprised 16 families who, with 20 others residing in Coldingham, made their living by fishing. In addition to these residents, 30 people proceeded annually to the north for the herring fishing, which provided employment for 14 boats from the village.

The village was renamed at the end of the 19th century by the then-laird, Andrew Usher, who played a major role in improving the fishing village and harbour. Usher purchased the Northfield estate on the edge of the village, enlarging and finishing the building of a countryside manor by the coastal shore in 1892. He considered the local public hall inadequate and subsequently funded a new village hall and school, which was constructed in 1887 and is now occupied by the St Abbs visitor centre. Usher also gave funds for the building of the local church in 1892 and the extension of the outer harbour wall in 1890.

Local boarding house owner Isabel Cowe campaigned for St Abbs to have its own lifeboat. In November 1907 the Member of Parliament (MP) for Berwickshire, Harold Tennant, announced that the Royal National Lifeboat Society had agreed to supply St Abbs with a lifeboat, and that the Board of Trade had also agreed to place life-saving apparatus at St Abbs as soon as possible.

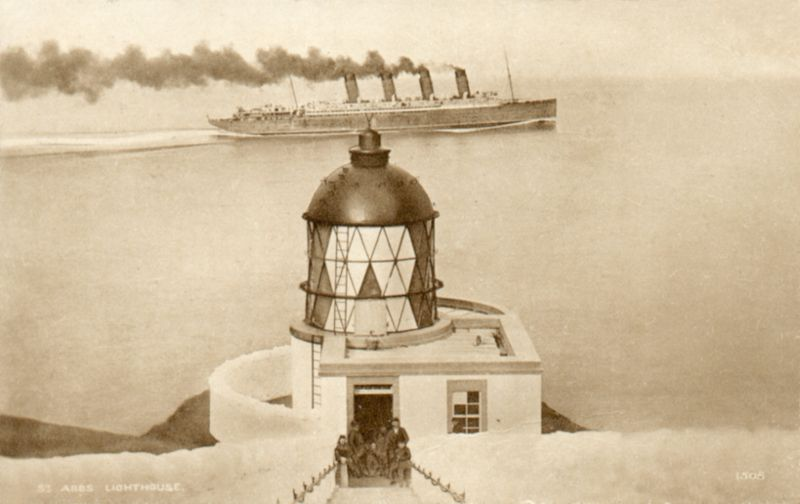
The RMS Mauretania during a speed trial off St Abbs, Scotland, 18 September 1907. The lighthouse and its buildings are still there and appear essentially the same.

On 5 September 1914, HMS Pathfinder was sunk off St Abbs Head by the German U-21, the first Royal Navy ship to be sunk by a U-boat.

St Abbs was the main subject of the book, Ebb Tide: Adrift on the Waves of Memory With the Fisher Folk of Berwickshire, by Will Wilson.

== Village today ==
St Abbs is a popular site for scuba divers. The sea around the village is unusually clear, in contrast to the more silt-laden coastal waters further to the north or south. These clear waters and the spectacular underwater scenery resulted in Britain's first Voluntary Marine Reserve being established at St Abbs. The Marine Reserve was established on 18 August 1984 by David Bellamy.

Shore diving to a depth of about 15 metres is possible from the rocks on the outside of the harbour wall. It is common for trainees to do initial sea dives here.

The double archway at "Cathedral Rock" is just 50 metres from the shore. Several small, nearby rocky islands, such as "Big Green Carr", "Broad Craig" and "Little Carr" are near to the harbour and can be easily circumnavigated underwater.

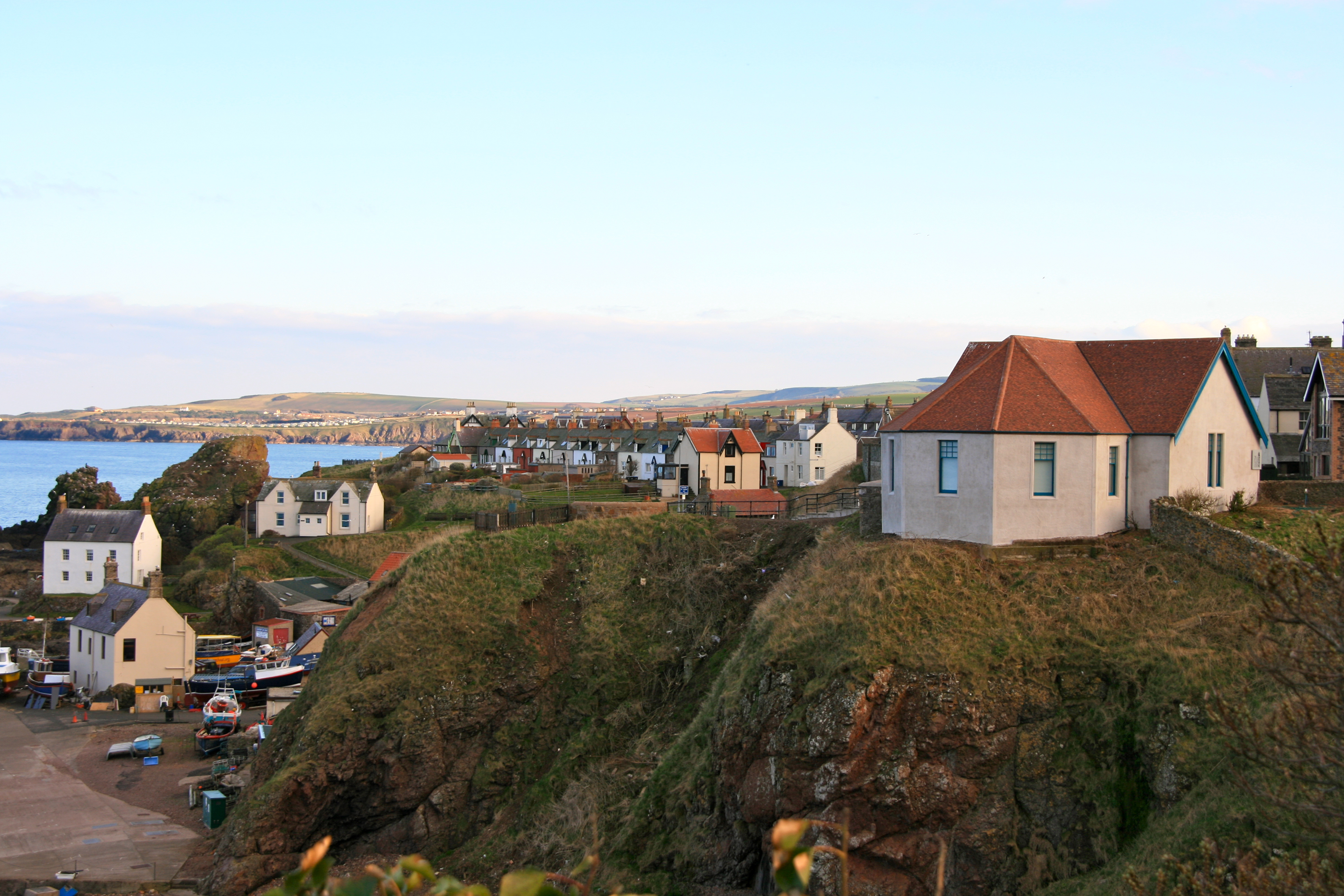
St Abbs Visitor Centre

A new visitor centre was opened in St Abbs in March 2011. The centre is located in the former village hall, which was built in 1897 with funds made available by the whisky tycoon Andrew Usher.

St Abbs has its own privately funded independent volunteer Lifeboat Station. The lifeboat station was originally established in 1911 following the sinking of the S.S. Alfred Erlandsen. The station was previously managed by the RNLI but following the withdrawal of the RNLI lifeboat in 2015, a local fundraising effort saw the station saved through public donations and generous funding from the Tunnock's bakery company. The lifeboat station became operational again on 17 September 2016 when the new lifeboat was christened the Thomas Tunnock and launched down the slipway.

The village also features in the 2019 superhero film Avengers: Endgame as the location of New Asgard, a town settled by the surviving Asgardians and led by Thor. Following the film's release, the village saw a surge in tourism and popularity. The village sign has also been modified to say the village is twinned with New Asgard.

In 2019, St Abbs featured as the "Isle of Eroda" in the music video of Harry Styles' single "Adore You".

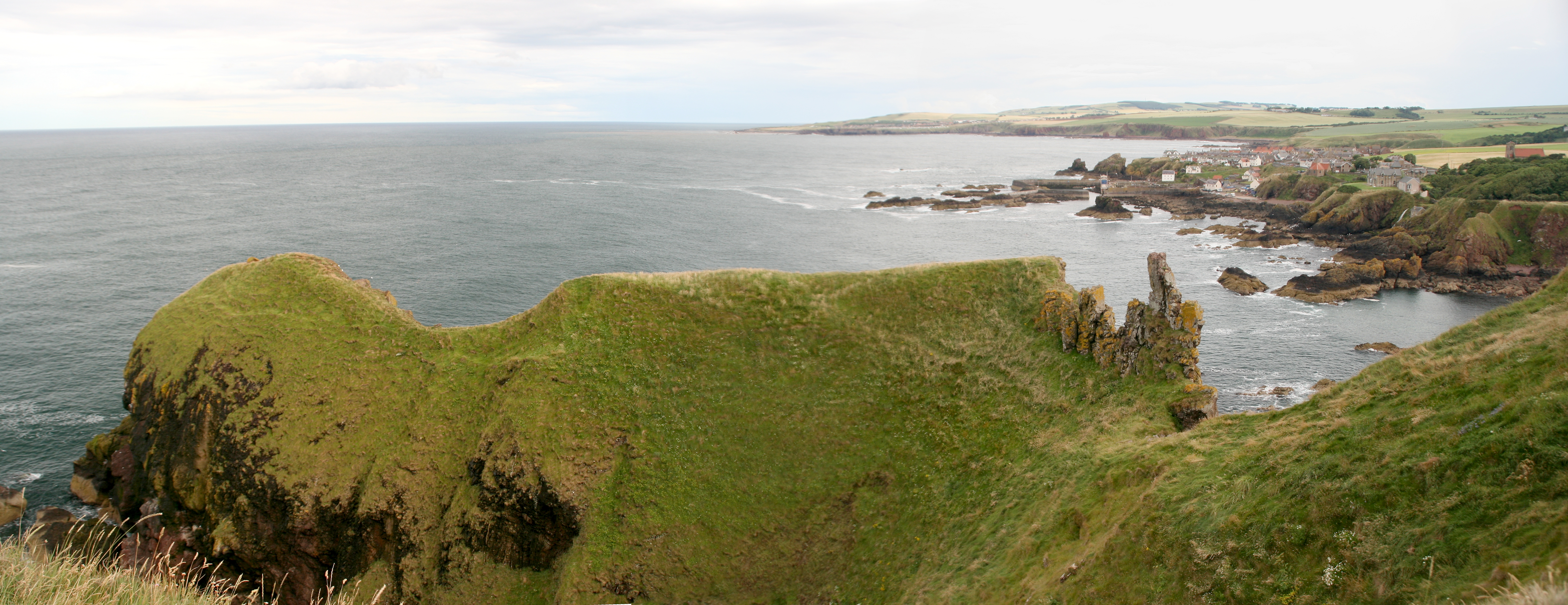

center

== People from St Abbs ==
- William Dickson FRSE, chemist and educator.

== Twinned towns ==
Signs have been erected throughout the village declaring that it has been twinned with "New Asgard", as it was the location of filming in Avengers: Endgame. It also has been twinned with "Eroda", a fictitious island created by Harry Styles for the music video for "Adore You".

== See also ==
- List of places in the Scottish Borders
