= Eyemouth =

Coastal town in Berwickshire, Scotland

Coordinates: 55.871°N 2.093°W

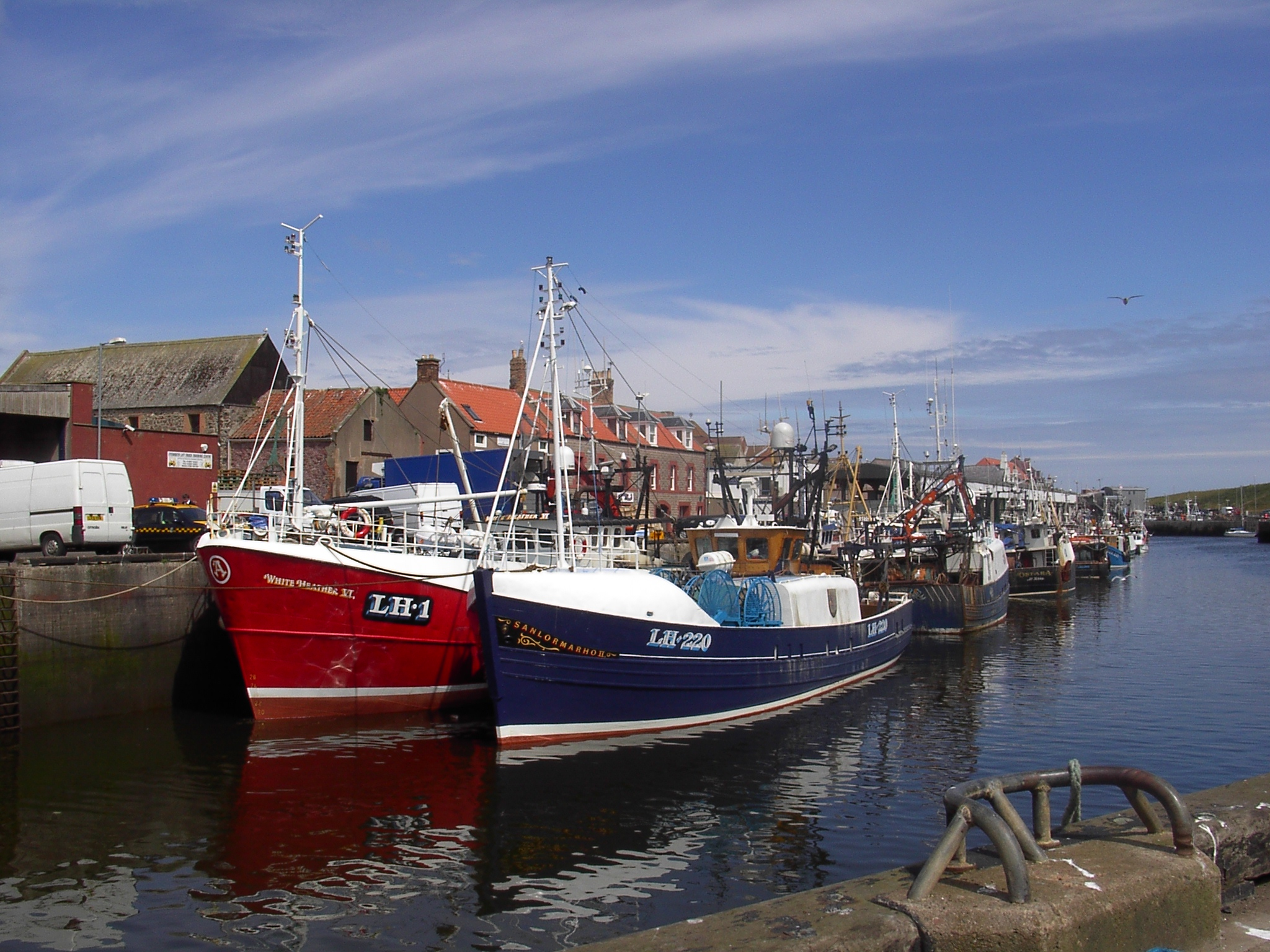
- Eyemouth Harbour

- Location within the Scottish Borders
- Population: 3,701 (2022)
- OS grid reference: NT944640
  - Edinburgh: 43 mi (69 km)
  - London: 312 mi (502 km)
- Civil parish: Eyemouth
- Council area: Scottish Borders
- Lieutenancy area: Berwickshire
- Country: Scotland
- Sovereign state: United Kingdom
- Post town: Eyemouth
- Postcode district: TD14
- Dialling code: 01890
- Police: Scotland
- Fire: Scottish
- Ambulance: Scottish
- UK Parliament: Berwickshire, Roxburgh and Selkirk
- Scottish Parliament: Ettrick, Roxburgh and Berwickshire

Eyemouth is a coastal harbour town and civil parish in Berwickshire, in the Scottish Borders area of Scotland. It is two miles (three kilometres) east of the main north–south A1 road and eight miles (thirteen kilometres) north of Berwick-upon-Tweed. It had a population of 3,701 in 2022.

The town's name comes from its location at the mouth of the Eye Water. The Berwickshire coastline consists of high cliffs over deep clear water with sandy coves and picturesque harbours. A fishing port, Eyemouth holds a yearly Herring Queen Festival. Notable buildings in the town include Gunsgreen House and a cemetery watch-house built to stand guard against the Resurrectionists (body snatchers). Many of the features of a traditional fishing village are preserved in the narrow streets and "vennels".

Eyemouth is not far from the small villages of Ayton, Reston, St Abbs, Coldingham, and Burnmouth, all in Berwickshire.

The coast offers opportunities for birdwatching, walking, fishing and diving. Accommodation includes several hotels, B&Bs and a holiday park.

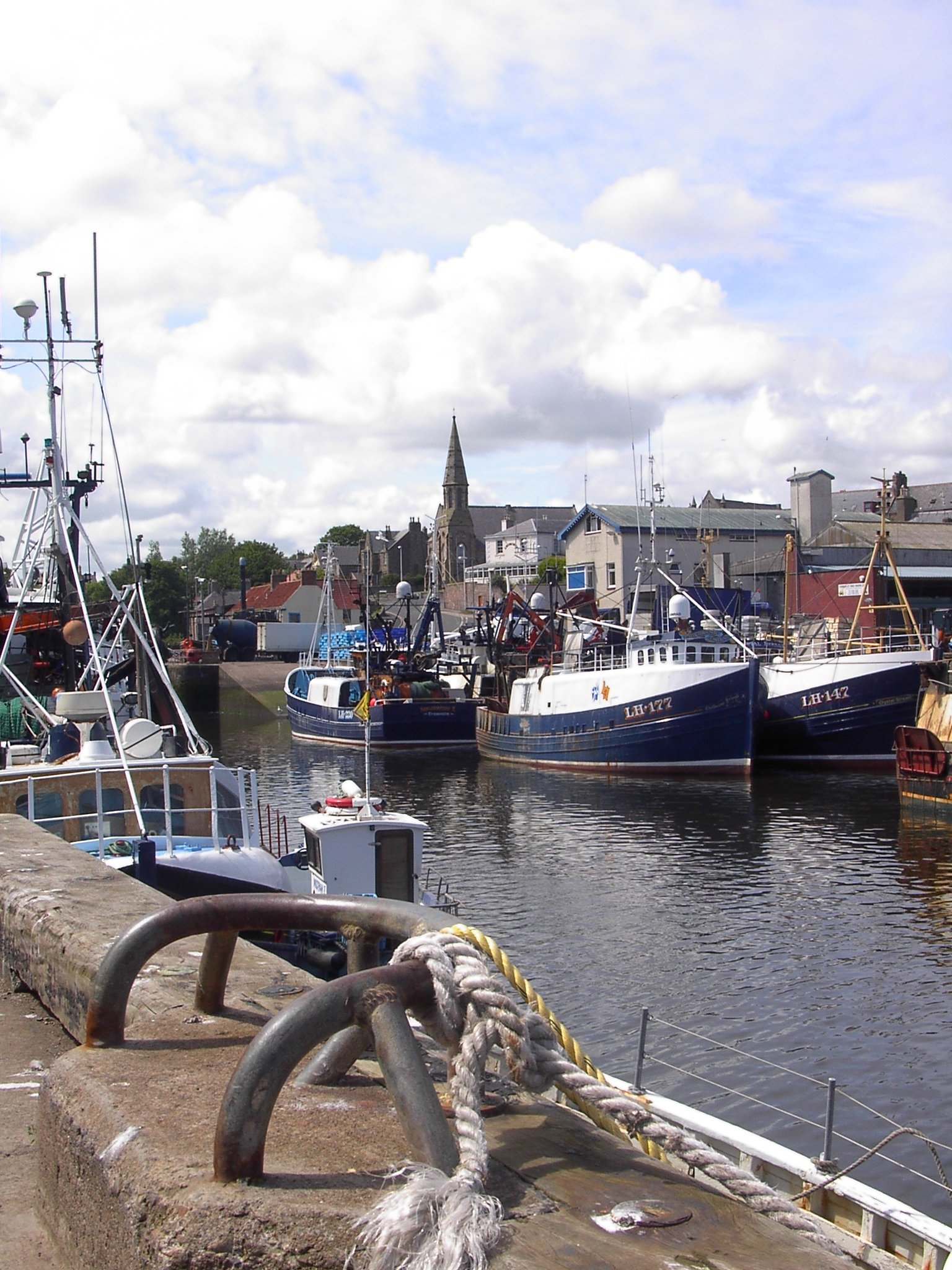
Eyemouth Harbour

== History of Eyemouth ==
=== A 16th-century artillery fortress ===
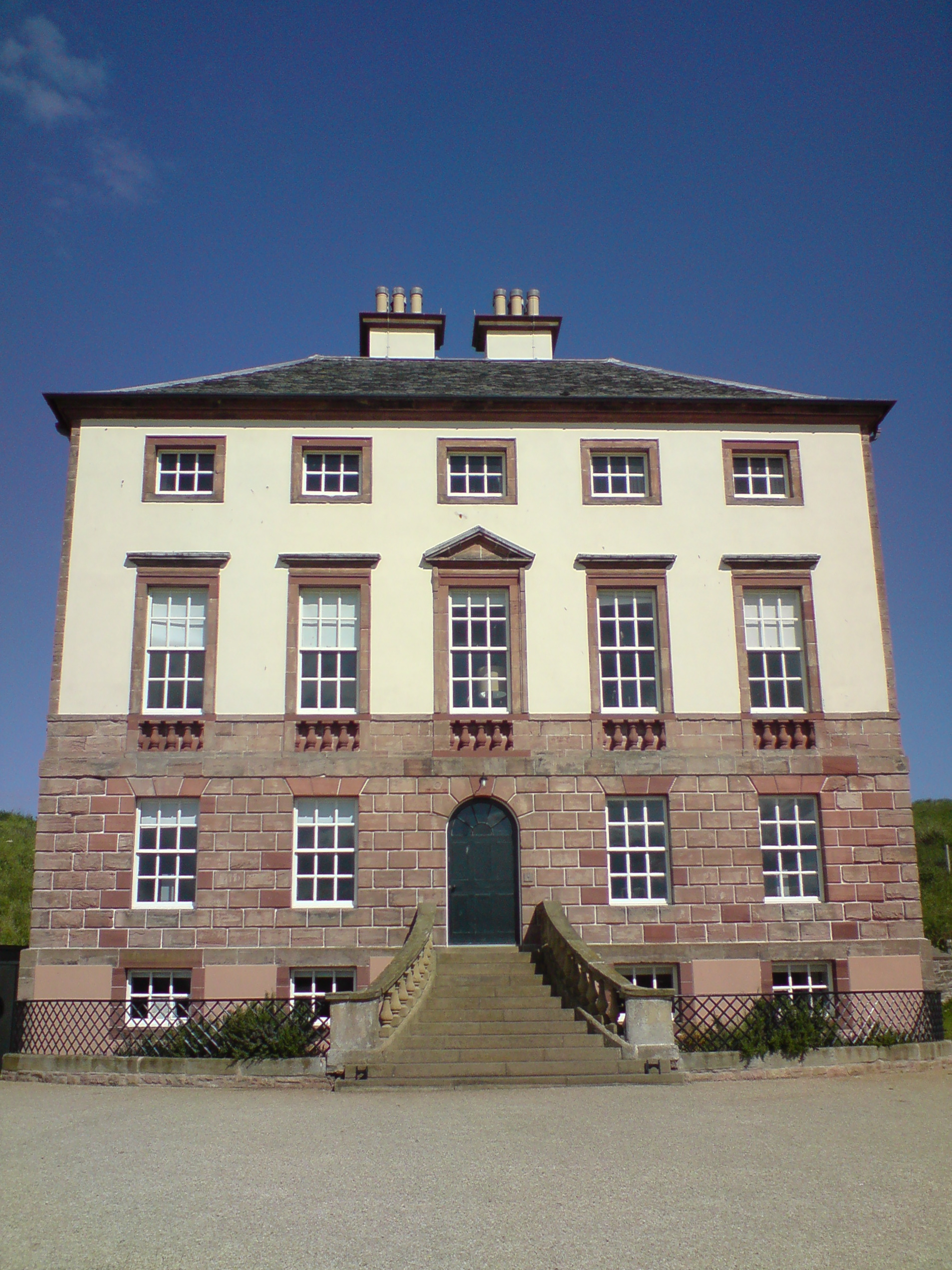
Gunsgreen House, Eyemouth

Fort Point at Eyemouth was the site of the first trace-italienne-style fortification in Britain, built on a spur or peninsula overlooking the existing harbour during the war known as the Rough Wooing. Building commenced in 1547 by the English military engineer Sir Richard Lee (1513–1575), and it cost £1,906. Some of the stone was brought from a demolished tower at Dunglass Castle, East Lothian and timber was taken from Coldingham Priory.

The fort was demolished under the Treaty of Boulogne in 1551. A larger and more complex fort was built in 1557 and 1558 by d'Oisel and probably the Italian military engineer Lorenzo Pomarelli for the Regent of Scotland, Mary of Guise, when at war with England. The new fortress could hold some 500 French troops, and may have been intended as a staging post to securely store munitions and artillery near Berwick-upon-Tweed and the border with England. New fortifications were built at Berwick in response.

New picks, mattocks, and shovels made in Edinburgh Castle were shipped to the workforce from Leith in April 1558, and provisions with butter, biscuit, cheese, flour, and ling (salt fish) were sent until October. However, the new work at Eyemouth, which perhaps was never completed, was scheduled for demolition under the Treaty of Cateau-Cambrésis in 1559. French garrisons remained in Scotland at Dunbar Castle, Inchkeith, and at Leith. The landward ramparts from both the English and French phases are still to be seen as earthworks.

=== 17th and 18th centuries ===
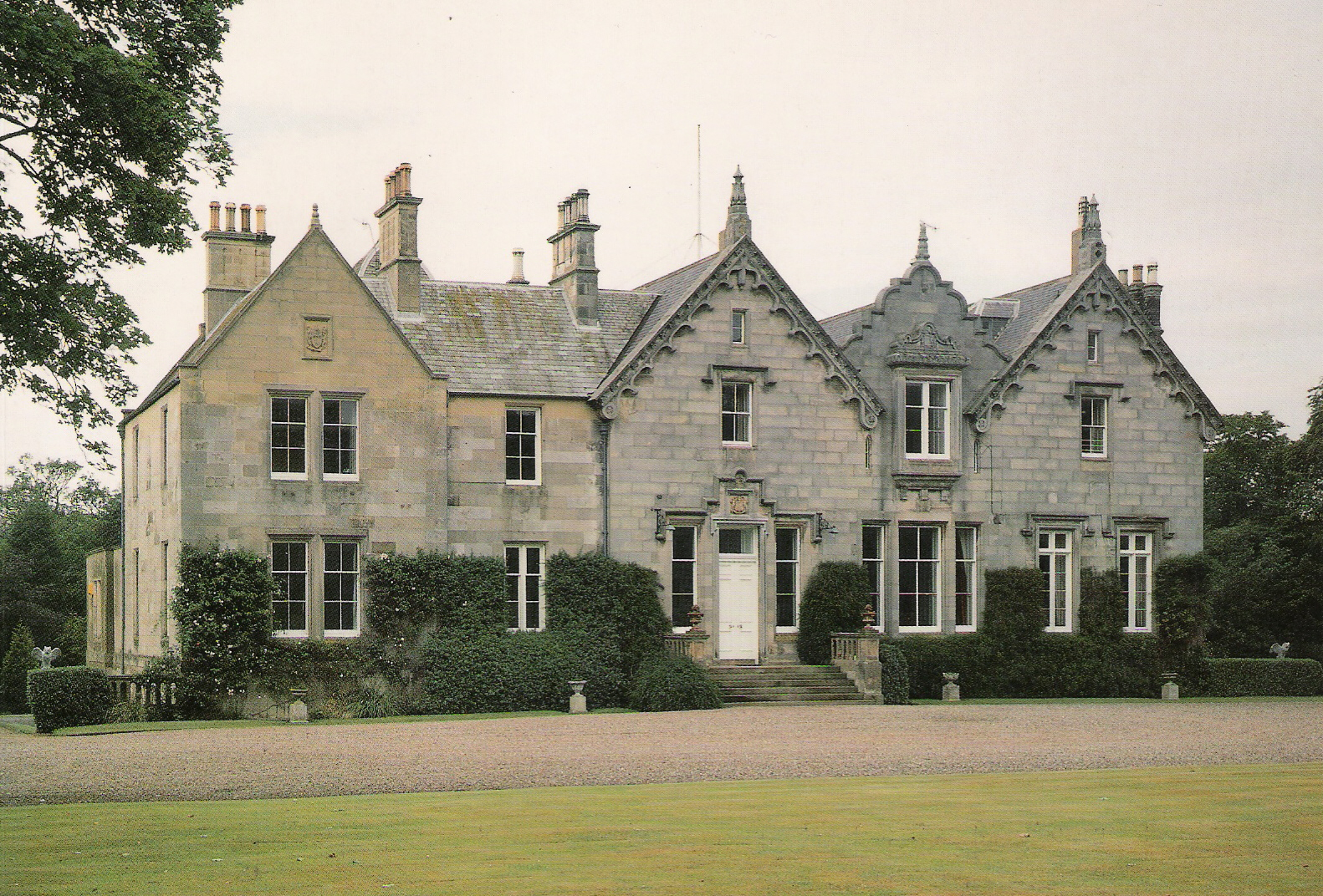
Netherbyres House

Eyemouth fell within the feudal barony of Coldingham, possessed until the early 17th century by Coldingham Priory, after which it passed to the Home family, who had held lands in that barony since at least the 15th century. All landowners (portioners) within the barony held their properties either by hereditary feu or by a term-renewable, occasionally hereditary, tack (Scots word for a lease) from the barony.

The lands between the southern banks of the Eye Water consisted of three estates: Gunsgreen, immediately opposite Eyemouth and Netherbyres, once part of the larger lands of Flemington which stretched all the way to Lamberton. At the beginning of the 17th century Gunsgreen estate was possessed by Alexander Lauder of Gunsgreen, a great-great-grandson of Sir Robert Lauder of The Bass. On 17 January 1629, Alexander Lauder of Gunsgreen, acting as bailie for Sir David Home of Wedderburn, gave a sasine to Andrew Gray in Eyemouth, of some land on the boundaries of Houndlaw and also in Eyemouth.

Netherbyres was for at least 250 years held by the Craw (originally Auchincraw) family. "George Craw of Netherbyre" was "deceased" by July 1614 when his son William came into possession of that property and Reidhall, "with the walk mill" extending to 12 husbandlands (312 acres (126 hectares)). A later William Craw, who had a passion for mathematics, built the first modern harbour at Eyemouth and, in 1715, the elliptical walled garden, the latter almost certainly unique in the world. The Netherbyres House we see today was commenced about 1835 for Captain Samuel Brown, who had the patent and monopoly for the supply of anchor chain to the Royal Navy. He later went on to design and patent chain suspension piers and bridges, including the Union Bridge over the River Tweed,

John Churchill, 1st Duke of Marlborough was created Lord Churchill of Eyemouth in the Peerage of Scotland in 1682. This was the first of his peerage titles. In the late 18th century Dutch engineers undertook a survey for a canal linking Eyemouth to Duns. The plan would have involved damming the Whiteadder Water at Chirnside thus diverting the course of the Whiteadder Water through the low-lying area known as Billiemire to join the Eye Water near Ayton. The plan was never carried out.

=== 19th century onwards ===
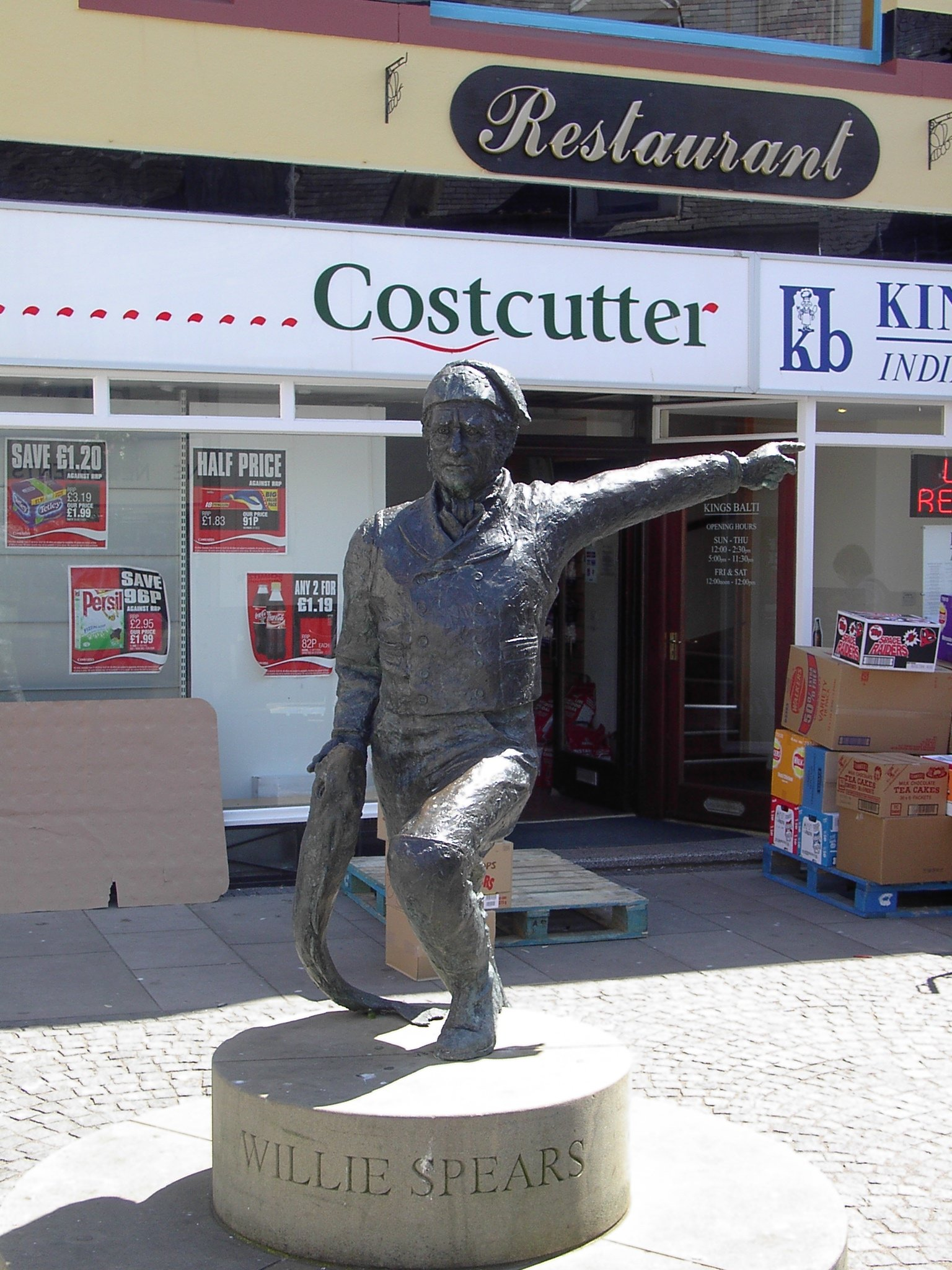
Bronze statue of William Spears.

The hero William Spears (1812–1885) is celebrated by a bronze statue in Eyemouth Market Place, where he stands pointing the way to Ayton, the scene of his peaceful demonstration. Spears led a revolt against the tithes on fish levied by the Church of Scotland, even after the great Disruption of 1843 when most fishermen left the established Church to join other congregations.

Very soon after the cost of getting the tithes removed had been met, the town was struck by the Eyemouth Disaster when, on 14 October 1881, most of the fishing fleet, some 20 boats and 129 men from the town, were lost in a terrible storm. Including victims from other coastal towns, a total of 189 men lost their lives. This is commemorated in the Eyemouth Tapestry housed in the museum.

A contemporary article offers an interesting insight into Eyemouth in the 1860s:

Between St Abbs Head and Berwick, however is situated Eyemouth, a fishing village pure and simple, with all that wonderful filth scattered about which is a sanitary peculiarity of such towns. The population of Eyemouth is in keeping with the outward appearance of the place. As a whole, they are rough, uncultivated, and more drunken in their habits than the fishermen of the neighbouring villages. Coldingham Shore, for instance, is only three miles distant, and has a population of about one hundred fishermen, of a very respectable class, sober and well dressed, and well to do.

The Six-inch Second Edition OS Map of Eyemouth shows the state of the harbour after 19th Century developments. The harbour was significantly extended in the latter part of the 20th Century. The following statistics show that in the years before the First World War Eyemouth was a successful fishing port.

Fishery Statistics

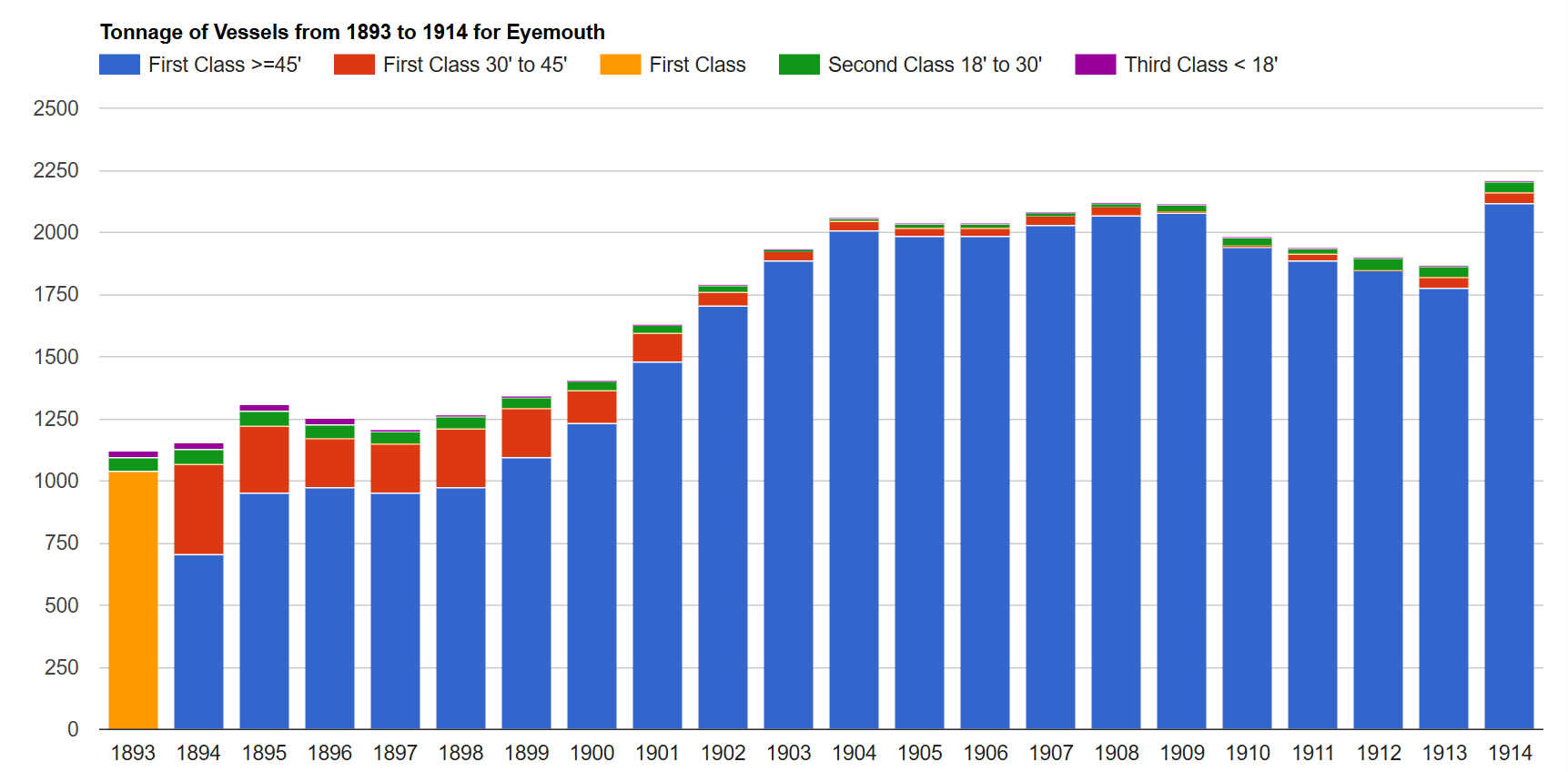
Tonnage of vessels

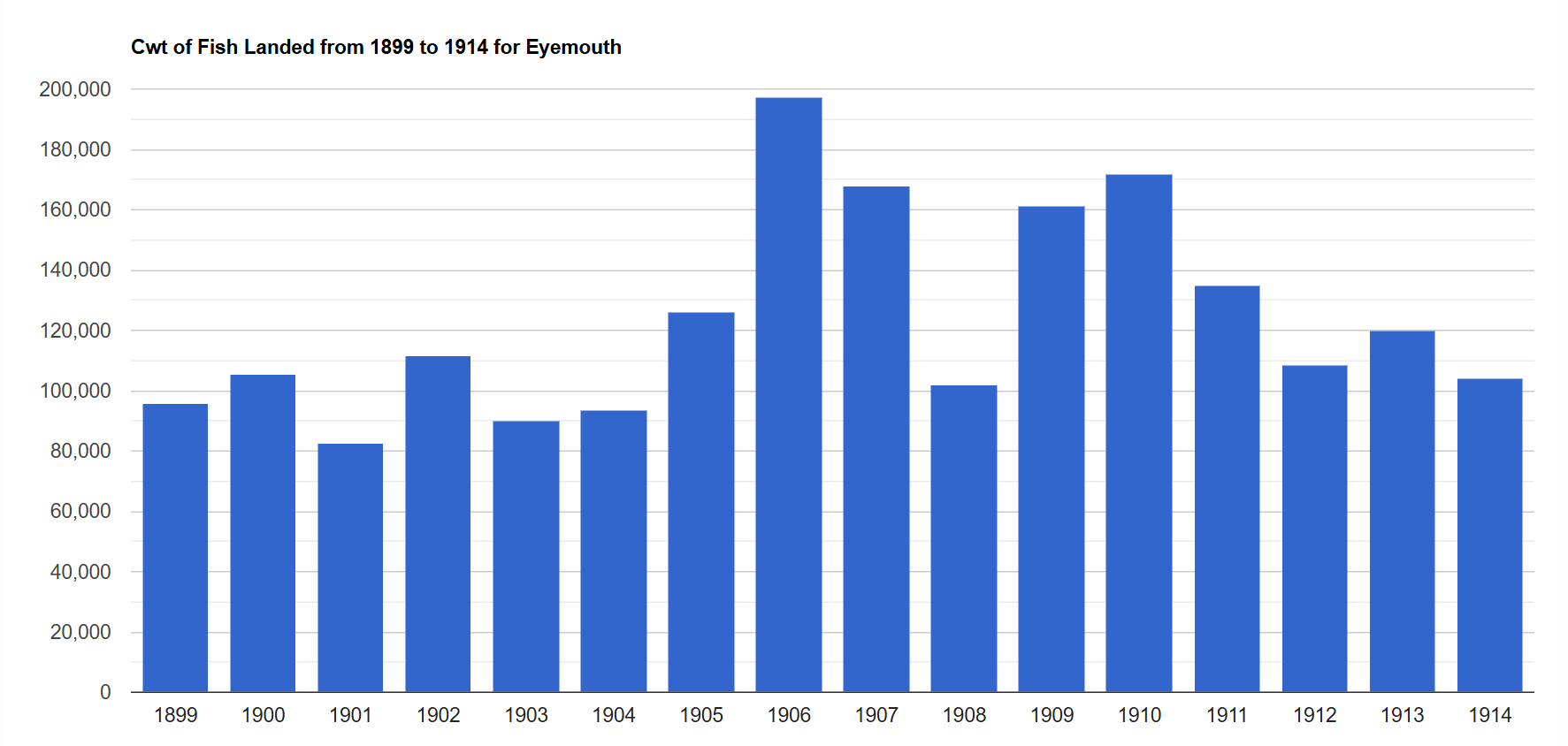
Cwt of fish landed

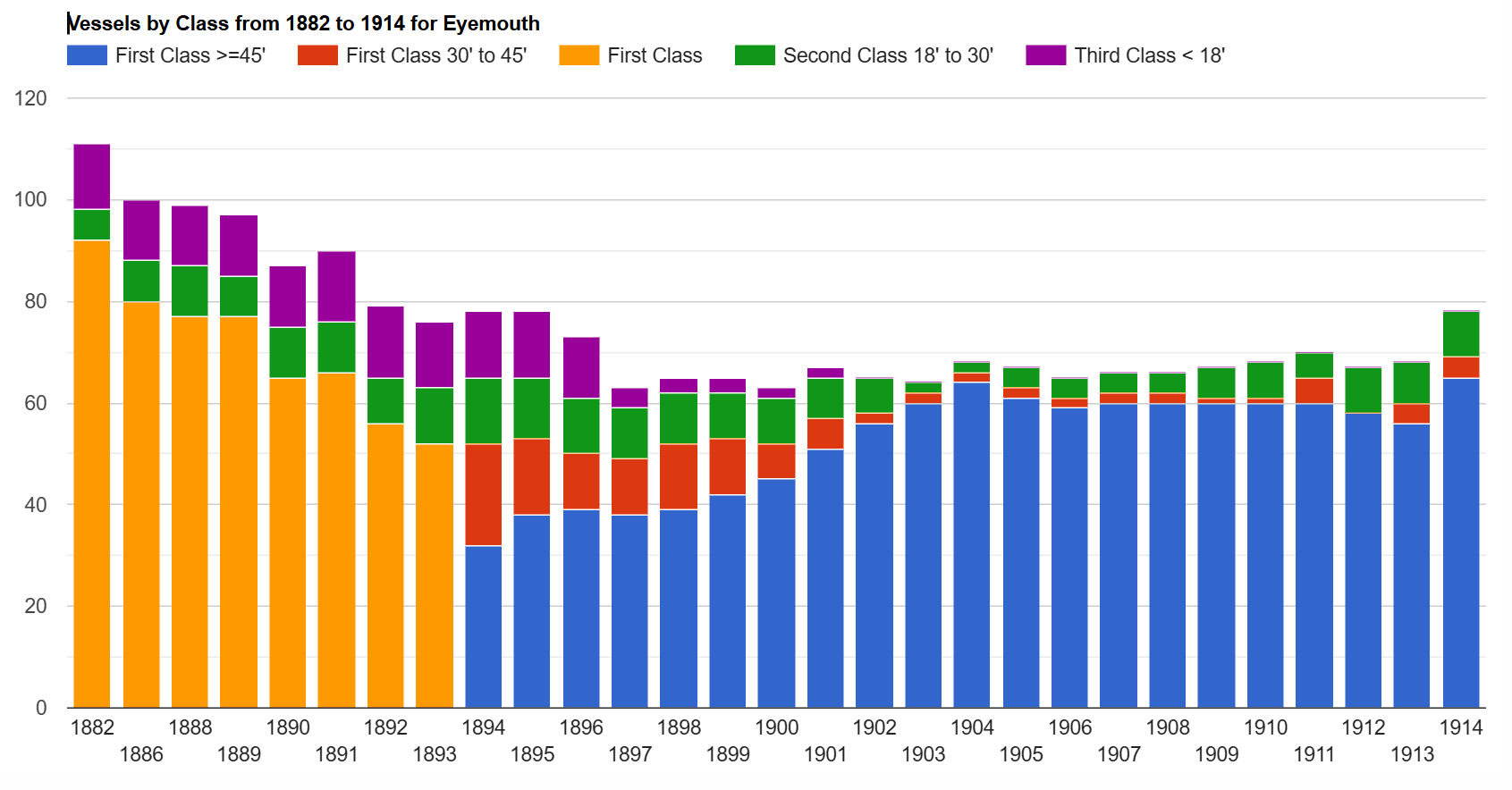
Vessels by class

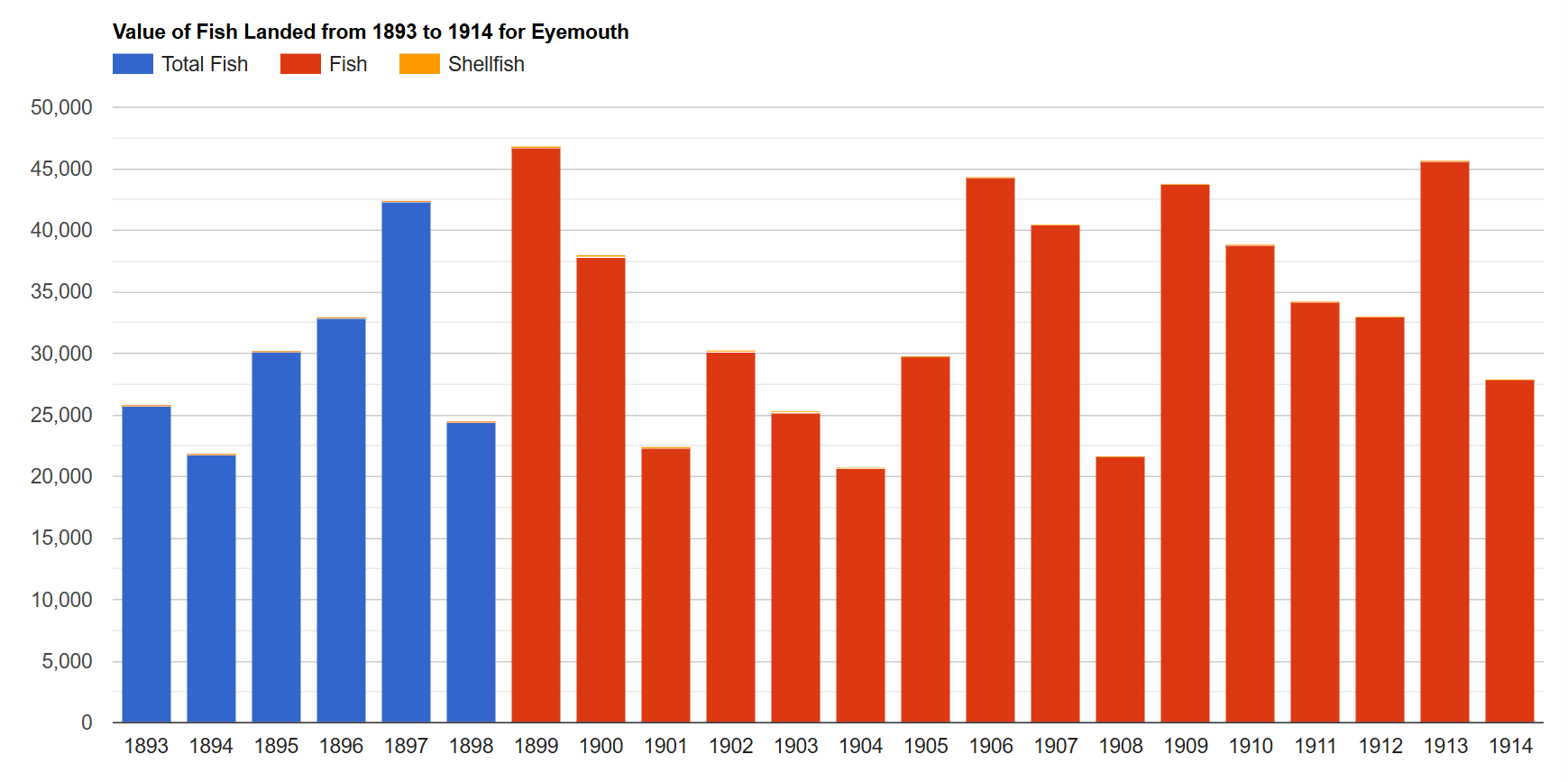
Value (£] of fish landed

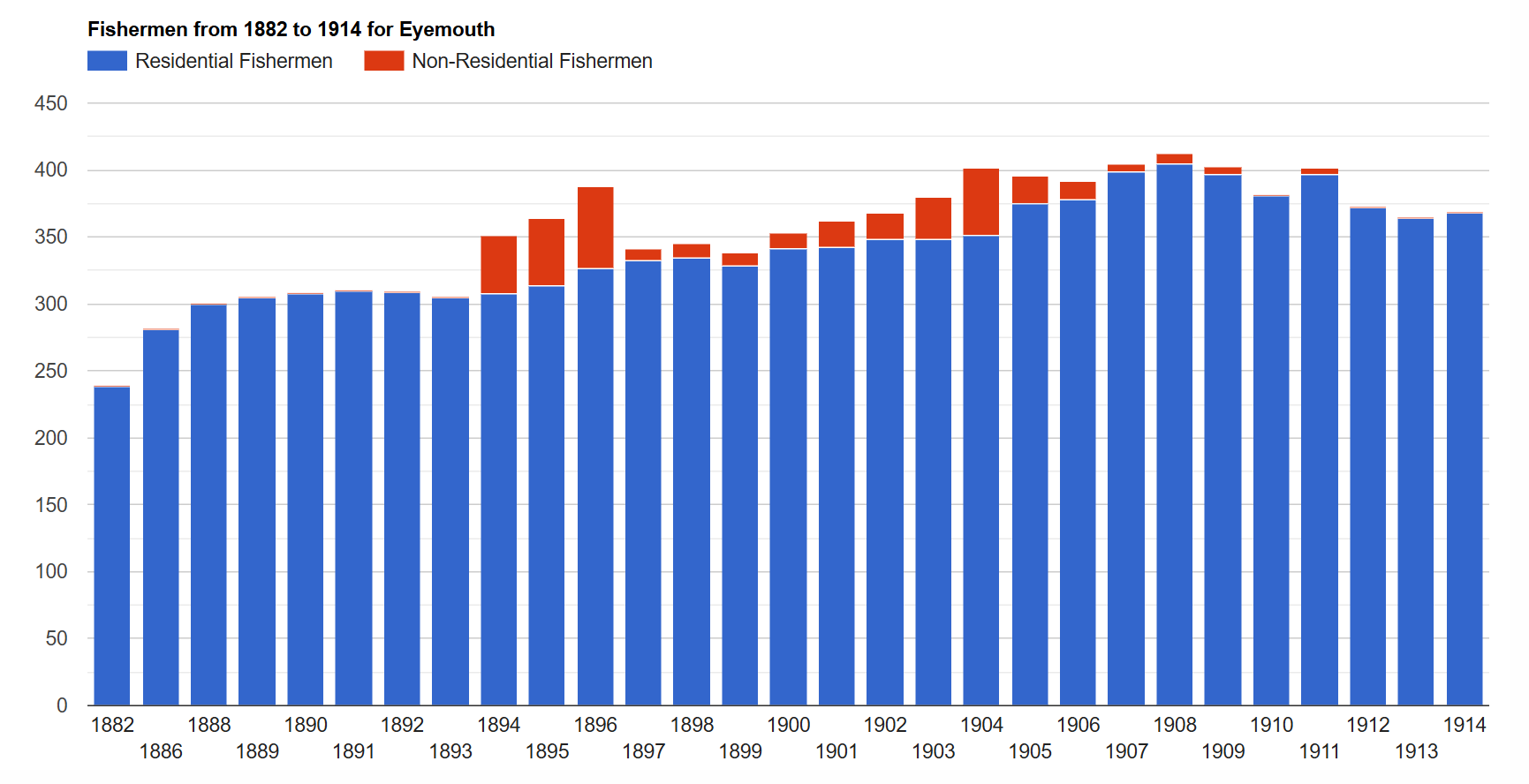
Fishermen

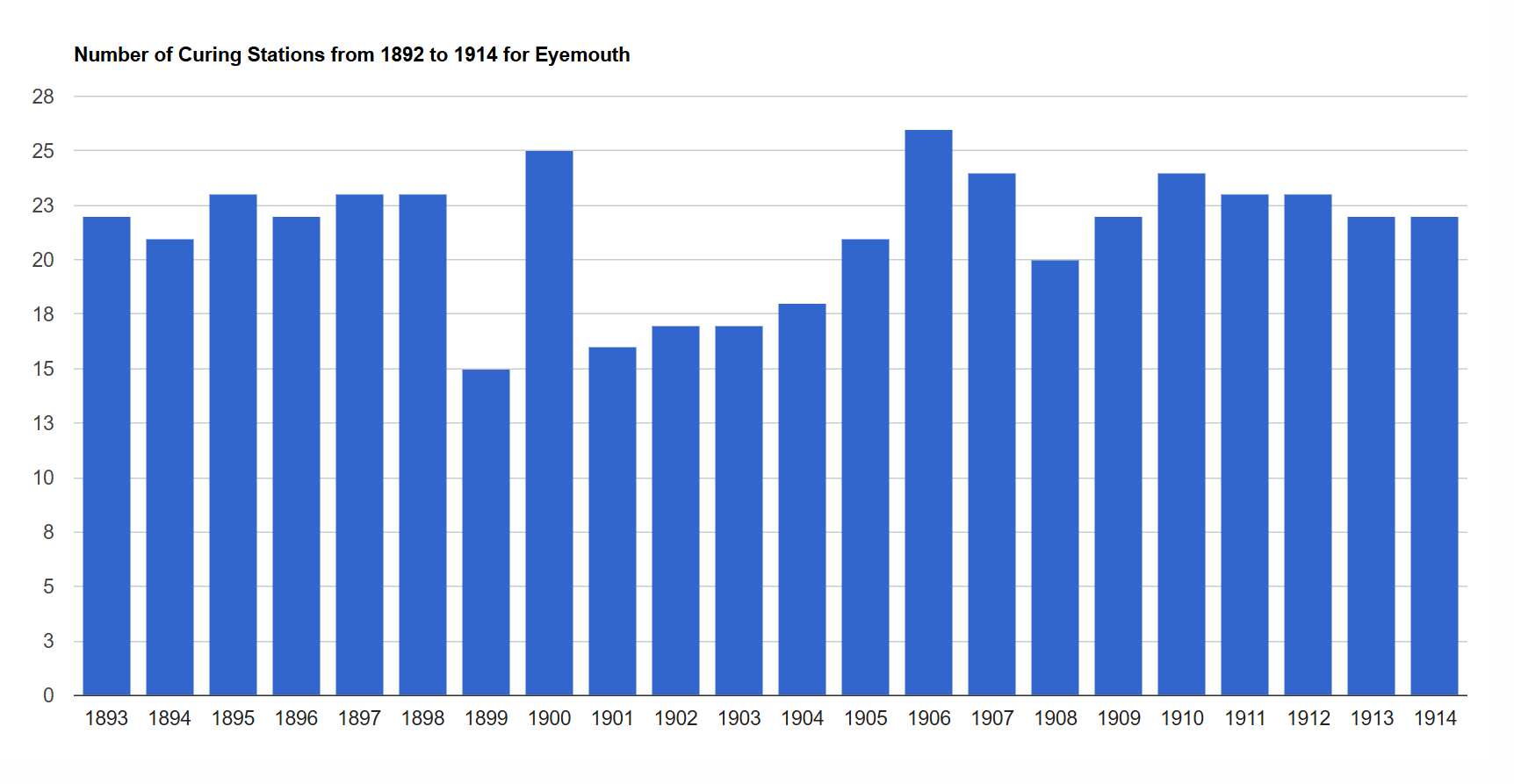
Number of curing stations

In December 1920, a war memorial was unveiled in the town to those who died in the First World War. Netherbyres House was bought by Christopher Furness in 1928, and was donated to Gardeners' Royal Benevolent Society for charitable use by his second son, Colonel Simon Furness, the Vice Lord Lieutenant for Berwickshire.

From 1891 until 1962, the town was served by a short branch railway line that ran from Burnmouth on the present-day East Coast Main Line. The line was forced to close from August 1948 to June 1949 after being damaged by the flooding of the Eye Water.

In October 2016, a statue was unveiled to commemorate the Eyemouth Fishing Disaster of 1881. It is a five-metre long bronze sculpture called 'Widows and Bairns'.

== Transport ==
The A1 road, the main Edinburgh – Newcastle route, puts the town within commuting distance of Edinburgh.

Eyemouth railway station served the town until it was closed in 1962. The nearest railway station is Reston railway station, The 253 bus route, operated Borders Buses, stops at Reston railway station

== Education ==
Eyemouth Public School, in Albert Road, was built in 1876, designed by the architect William Gray Junior.

Children attend Eyemouth Primary School, after which they attend Eyemouth High School.

There is a further education training centre in the town. Northumberland College in Berwick-upon-Tweed is eight miles (13 km) away, and full-time further and higher education courses are offered at Borders College and Heriot-Watt University's textiles campus in Galashiels.

== Media ==
Local news and television programmes are provided by BBC Scotland and ITV Border. Television signals are received from the local relay transmitter.

Eyemouth's local radio stations are BBC Radio Scotland on 94.1 FM and Greatest Hits Radio Scottish Borders and North Northumberland on 103.4 FM.

The Border Telegraph and Southern Reporter are the town's local newspapers.

== Harbour and industry ==
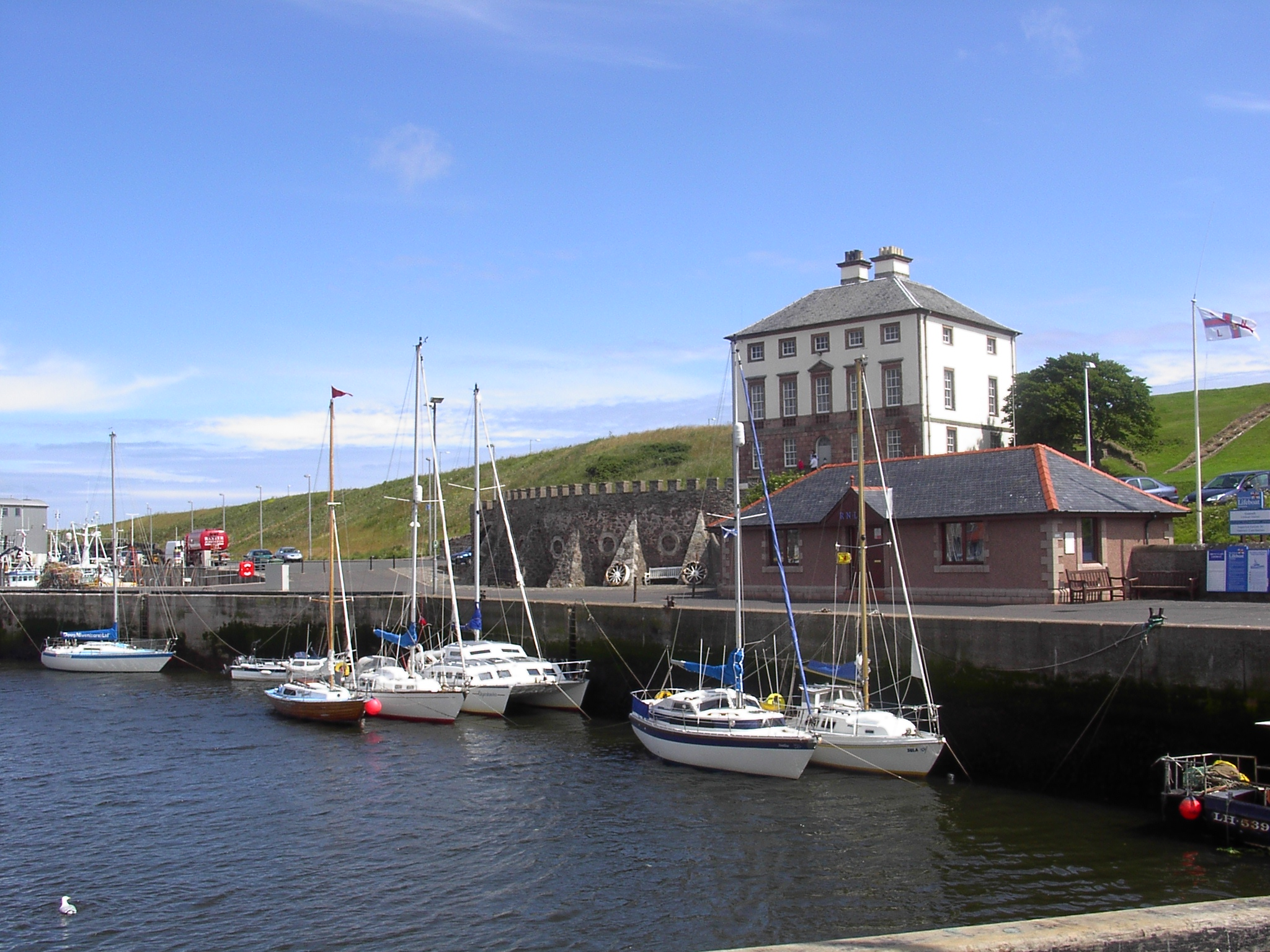
Yachts berthed in Eyemouth Harbour

Eyemouth's harbour dates to at least the 12th century, when it served as a port and fishing village associated with Coldingham Priory. In addition to fishing, the harbour supported the export of agricultural produce, including wool and animal hides, and the import of building materials such as lead and timber. Major improvements were made in the 19th century, including the construction of a new harbour following a 1881 disaster in which 189 local men were killed in a hurricane not far from the shore.

In 1997, Eyemouth was given EU funding from a scheme to regenerate declining fishing villages and raised matching funds itself to construct a deep water extension to the harbour. Eyemouth Harbour caters for most types of fishery activity and as a result Eyemouth's primary industry has seen a certain amount of rejuvenation.

A deep-water basin and new harbour entrance were completed in 1999, followed by the opening of a new fish market in 2000.

A pontoon has been installed in the harbour to provide ease of boarding for seafarers. Volunteers for Her Majesty's Coastguard and the seagoing RNLI lifeboat are called out by the firing of maroons, one for the Coastguard and two for the Lifeboat.

There is a boatyard which carries out works to fishing and commercial vessels. The new harbour and fish market has toilets and showers which are available to visiting seamen. The visitor centre explains the methods of fishing, the types of nets and the vessels used and examples of the equipment of a typical fishing boat are displayed. Visitors can see the market in action in the early mornings from a viewing platform. Boats are available for hire for sea fishing, sightseeing and diving in one of the few marine reserves in Britain.

=== Eyemouth Pale ===
The Eyemouth pale is a cold-smoked haddock, distinct from varieties such as Finnan haddock by its lighter, golden hue, and subtler smoked flavour, achieved by a shorter smoking time.

== Politics ==
The elected Eyemouth Town Community Council is led by a chairman and has 12 members, including an Honorary Provost. Three representatives of Scottish Borders Council attend monthly public meetings in order to take on board and act upon feedback from the community councillors, who serve as a voice of the people of the town. Eyemouth Town Community Council (a Scottish Community Council), meets on the last Monday of the month (except in December) at 7.00pm in the community centre, minutes of the meetings being displayed on their website, on two notice boards in the town and also in the Berwickshire News.

== Attractions ==
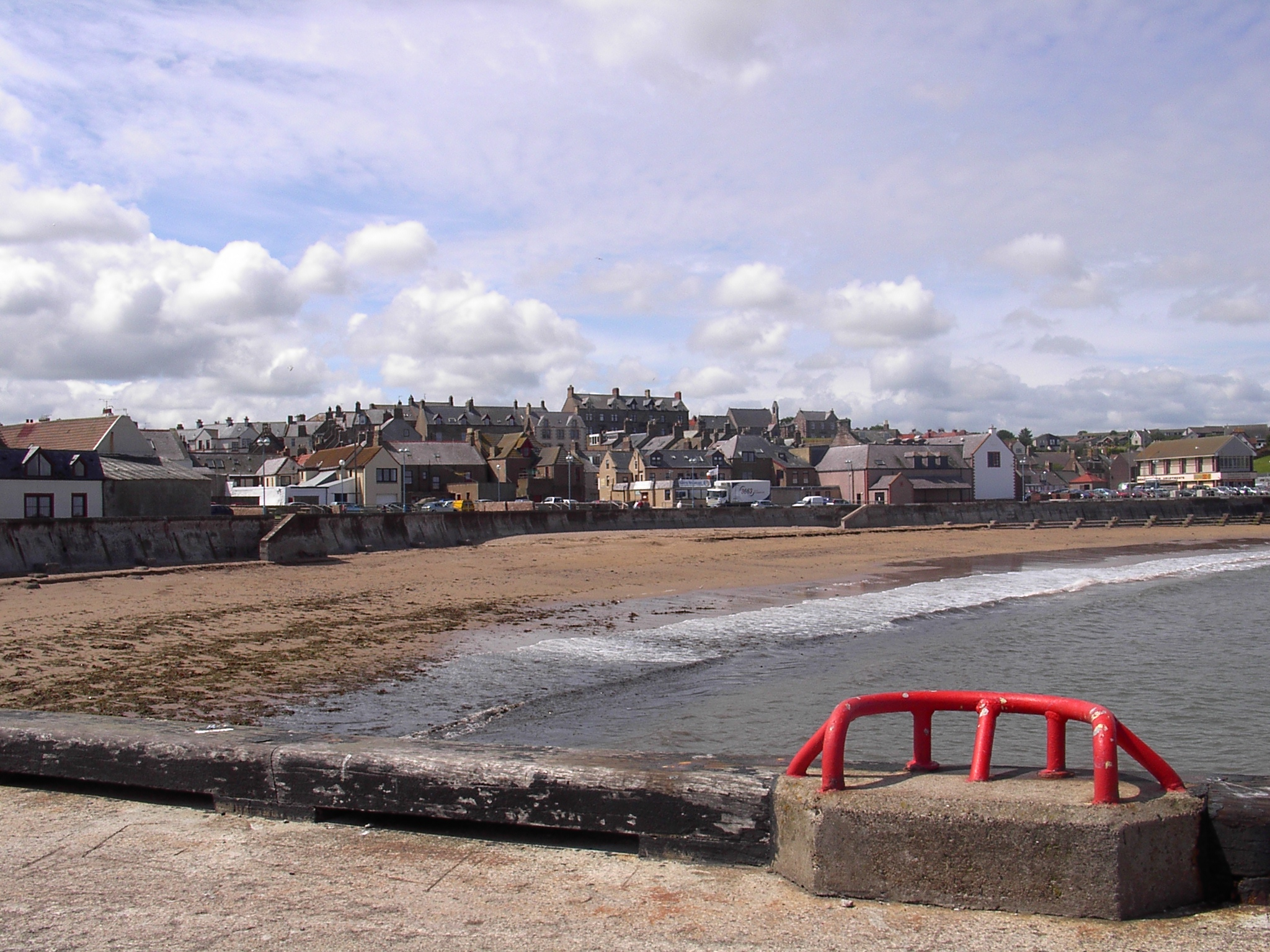
Beach and Bantry at Eyemouth

The wide sandy bay is flanked by high cliffs. Despite being sheltered by Hurkur Rocks, storms can generate high waves and throw high plumes of spume into the air over the sea wall. It is named "The Bantry", said to be in affectionate memory of the Irish labourers from the fishing town of that name in County Cork who constructed it.

The 18-hole golf course and clubhouse have sea views and a restaurant which is open to the public.

Divers can visit to the St Abbs and Eyemouth Voluntary Marine Reserve.

Eyemouth also has a leisure centre consisting of a gym, a studio, a sauna and two swimming pools, one small with a maximum depth of less than 3 feet and a big pool with a minimum depth of 3 feet to a maximum depth of 10 feet.

There is a resident seal, Sammy the seal in the harbour.

=== Nearby places of interest ===
Other places of interest nearby include the fortifications of Berwick-upon-Tweed also designed by Sir Richard Lee, and its military museum, Paxton House, the Union Bridge and the Chain Bridge Honey Farm, and scores of quiet country roads skirting the Cheviot Hills, frequently snow-capped in winter. Many visitors pause on their journey on the A1 to photograph their arrival in Scotland or their departure to England at the border crossing. Though the border has significance to many visitors, most residents of Eyemouth consider themselves Scottish rather than British. Nearby the border is a nature trail through the mysteriously named 'Conundrum' Farm. Typical Border towns and villages, such as Kelso, Grantshouse, Abbey St Bathans, Cove, Cockburnspath (pronounced 'coburnspath' or 'copath' by locals), Cornhill, Wooler, Morpeth, Alnmouth and Alnwick are all within easy reach for day trips from Eyemouth. Near Chirnside stood Ninewells House, since demolished, where Scottish Enlightenment philosopher David Hume spent much of his life.

== Popular culture ==
- ITV's Taggart was filmed on occasion at St Abbs and Coldingham Sands.
- Eyemouth is the setting for a novel by Susanna Kearsley titled The Shadowy Horses.
- Eyemouth is the home of the Queen of the Underworld in H.P. Mallory's series of Jolie Wilkins books.

== Notable people ==
- Marjory Dougal (1943–2020), administrator and vice-president of the Edinburgh Youth Orchestra for thirty years
- Craig Maltman (born 1953), professional golfer
- Adam Miller (1883–1917), professional footballer
- William Robertson (1805–1882), Church of Scotland minister

== Twin town ==
Eyemouth is twinned with:

- Marle, Aisne, France

== See also ==
- List of places in the Scottish Borders
