= Eyemouth railway station =

Disused railway station in Eyemouth, Scottish Borders

Eyemouth

General information
- Location: Eyemouth, Scottish Borders; Scotland
- Coordinates: 55.8687°N 2.0911°W
- Grid reference: NT943639
- Platforms: 2

Other information
- Status: Disused

History
- Original company: North British Railway
- Pre-grouping: North British Railway
- Post-grouping: LNER

Key dates
- 13 April 1891: Opened
- 13 August 1948: Closed due to flooding
- 29 June 1949: Reopened
- 5 February 1962: Closed permanently
Location

Eyemouth railway station served the village of Eyemouth, Scottish Borders, Scotland from 1891 to 1962 on the Eyemouth Railway.

== History ==
The station opened on 13 April 1891 by the North British Railway. The Eye Water flooded on 12 August 1948, which caused the station to close the day after, although it reopened on 29 June 1949. It closed again, along with the branch, to both passengers and goods traffic on 5 February 1962.

Preceding station	Historical railways	Following station
Terminus	North British Railway; Eyemouth Railway	Burnmouth; Line and station closed
