= Burnmouth railway station =

Disused railway station in Burnmouth, Ayton

Burnmouth
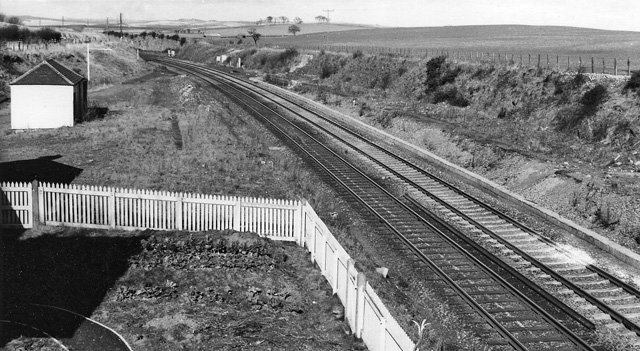
- The site of the station, looking north towards Edinburgh, in 1970

General information
- Location: Burnmouth, Ayton; Scotland
- Coordinates: 55.8429°N 2.0755°W
- Grid reference: NT953610
- Platforms: 3

Other information
- Status: Disused

History
- Original company: North British Railway
- Pre-grouping: North British Railway
- Post-grouping: LNER

Key dates
- July 1848: Opened
- 5 February 1962: Closed
Location

Burnmouth railway station served the village of Burnmouth, Ayton, Scotland from 1848 to 1962 on the East Coast Main Line.

== History ==
There is some confusion about when the station opened. The North British Railway opened the line between Berwick and Edinburgh Waverley on 22 June 1846 but Burnmouth station was not mentioned in the early timetables, first appearing in Bradshaw in July 1848. Quick (2022) does note that the station was mentioned in a company timetable, effective from 17 February 1847, as a stop for the Wednesdays only Edinburgh cattle market goods train, which also carried passengers.

The original building for the station was a one-storey building on a T-plan, but it is now a private residence.

The station became a junction on 13 April 1891 when the Eyemouth Railway was opened, providing a branch line connection to Eyemouth.

The station was host to a LNER camping coach in 1939.

The branch to Eyemouth closed on 5 February 1962 and Burnmouth station closed completely at the same time.

Preceding station	Historical railways	Following station
Berwick-upon-Tweed; Line and station open	North British Railway; East Coast Main Line	Ayton; Line open, station closed
Terminus	North British Railway; Eyemouth Railway	Eyemouth; Line and station closed
