= Hurkar Rocks =

Group of rocks in Scotland

Coordinates: 55.8782°N 2.0856°W

The Hurkar Rocks are a group of rocks outside the harbour of Eyemouth in the Scottish Borders area of Scotland. The rocks become exposed during low tide. The placenames vary from Hurkur, Hurker, Hurkar, Harkar, and Buss Craig Rock.

During the Eyemouth Disaster of 1881, a number of ships, returning from out of the storm, were wrecked upon these rocks. One of these was classified as an iron steamship, with a cargo of wheat. The date of loss was cited as 2 December 1894.

The Eyemouth Tapestry was sewn by 24 local ladies and took years to complete. With the help of the Eyemouth Museum Trust, the Eyemouth Tapestry is on display at the Eyemouth Maritime Centre.

== See also ==
- List of places in the Scottish Borders
- List of places in Scotland
