= Sciennes Primary School =

School in Edinburgh, Scotland

Coordinates: 55°56′18″N 3°11′16″W

Sciennes Primary School is a school in Edinburgh, Scotland. It opened in 1892 and is one of the largest in Edinburgh. The school is co-educational and non-denominational.

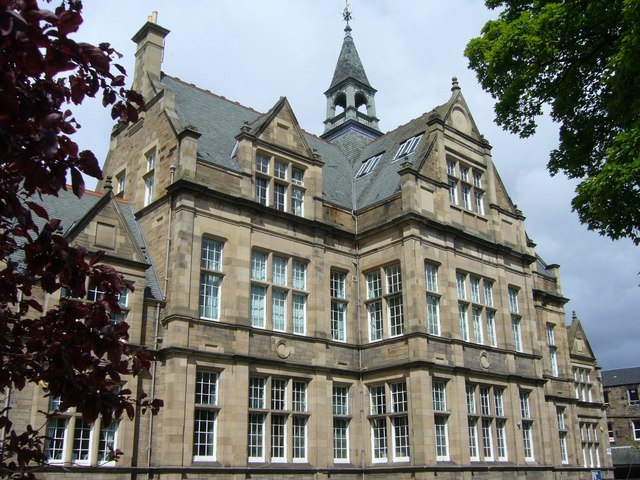
Sciennes Primary School

The School was formally opened on June 3 by Lord Reay, opened in March with 500 pupils and 16 members of staff. New pupils enrolled fast and by May there were over 1000 pupils on the roll. It is very popular and suffers from overcrowding. The school was considered to be operating at 105.08% of its capacity during the 2018–2019 school year. An extension is planned

Sciennes Primary School building was designed by Robert Wilson. The building is grade-B listed. The playground at the front of the building was divided down the middle by a railing to keep boys and girls apart. 'Boys' and 'Girls' is engraved in the stonework above the two entrances. The playground has been landscaped to create an ‘outdoor classroom / garden’ and a safe area in the street. The toilets were outside and not attached to the building.There was a bell tower on the roof. Sciennes was unusual for its time in having a swimming a pool in the basement where pupils for other schools sometimes came to have swimming classes. Windows in classrooms were designed to be high so that the outside world did not provide a distraction to pupils but large demonstrating the School Board's concern with the healthy effects of light and ventilation.

From 1914 the Education Board of Edinburgh offered the school facilities for Hebrew classes for Jewish children in Edinburgh on weekday afternoons.

== Former teachers ==
Marjory Dougal
