= Adam Miller (footballer, born 1883) =

Scottish footballer

Personal information
- Date of birth: 1883
- Place of birth: Eyemouth, Scotland
- Date of death: 21 December 1917 (aged 34)
- Place of death: Messines, Belgium
- Height: 5 ft 9 1/2 in (1.77 m)
- Position: Centre forward

Senior career*
Years	Team	Apps	(Gls)
- Coldstream
- Eyemouth
1905	Berwick Rangers	0	(0)
1905–1906	Hibernian	2	(0)
1906–1907	Raith Rovers	1	(0)
1907–1909	Berwick Rangers	0	(0)
- * Club domestic league appearances and goals

Adam Miller (1883 – 21 December 1917) was a Scottish professional footballer who played in the Scottish League for Hibernian and Raith Rovers as a centre forward.

== Personal life ==
Miller was educated at Eyemouth Public School. Prior to emigrating to Brisbane, Australia in 1912, he worked as a tailor and served in the Royal Garrison Artillery. In December 1914, four months after the outbreak of the First World War, he attested as a private in the 9th Battalion, Royal Queensland Regiment in Ayr. On 8 April 1915, Miller departed for the fighting from Brisbane on the HMAT Star of England and saw action at Gallipoli and on the Western Front. He was promoted to lance corporal in August 1916, but immediately reverted to private upon his own request.

During the course of his service, Miller suffered from several bouts of dysentery and was twice disciplined for going AWOL, for which he received field punishments no. 1 and 2 respectively. In May 1917, Miller was recommended for the Military Medal after showing "gallant conduct and devotion to duty under fire as [a] stretcher-bearer" during the Second Battle of Bullecourt, but he did not receive the award. On 21 December 1917, Miller was "killed carrying rations at Fanny's Dump, corner of Fanny's Street", in the vicinity of Messines. He is commemorated on the Menin Gate.

== Career statistics ==
Appearances and goals by club, season and competition
Club	Season	League			Scottish Cup		Other		Total	
Club	Season	Division	Apps	Goals	Apps	Goals	Apps	Goals	Apps	Goals
Berwick Rangers	1905–06	Eastern League	0	0	―		6 (Note: 3 appearances and 2 goals in East of Scotland Qualifying Cup, 2 appearances and 2 goals in Scottish Qualifying Cup, 1 appearance and 3 goals in King Cup)	7	6	7
Hibernian	1905–06	Scottish First Division	2	0	0	0	―		2	0
Raith Rovers	1906–07	Scottish Second Division	1	0	0	0	―		1	0
Berwick Rangers	1906–07	Eastern League	0	0	―		1 (Note: Appearance in East of Scotland Qualifying Cup)	0	1	0
Berwick Rangers	1907–08	―					6 (Note: 2 appearances in King Cup, 1 appearance in East of Scotland Qualifying Cup, 1 appearance in Border Cup, 1 appearance and 1 goal in Scottish Qualifying Cup, 1 appearance and 1 goal in Scottish Consolation Cup)	2	6	2
Berwick Rangers	1908–09	―					2 (Note: 1 appearance in Border Cup, 1 appearance in Scottish Qualifying Cup)	0	2	0
Berwick Rangers	Total		3	0	0	0	15	9	18	9
Career total			3	0	0	0	15	9	18	9
