= Eyemouth Railway =

Former railway line in the English and Scottish borders

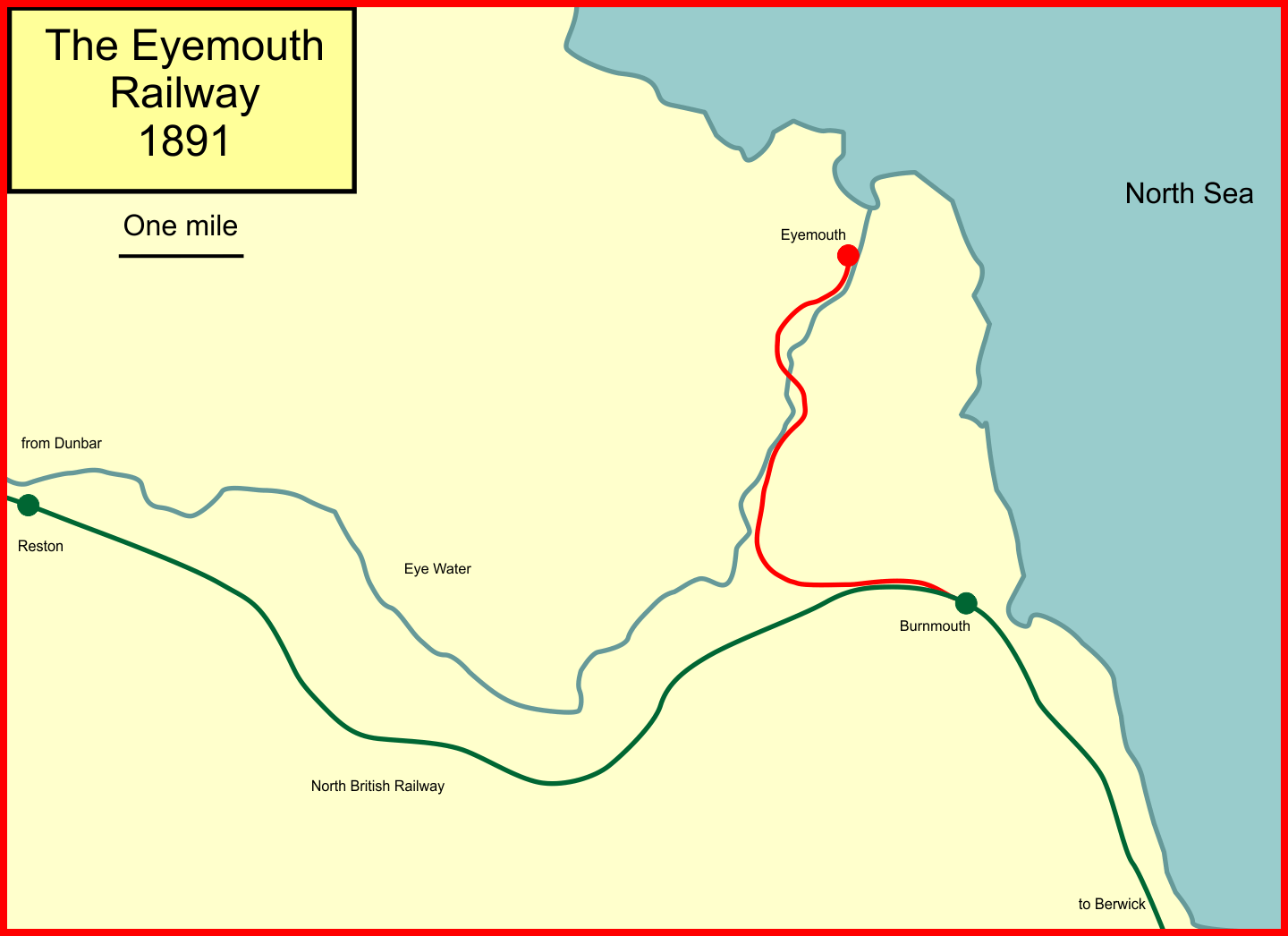

The Eyemouth Railway was a three-mile single track branch line in Berwickshire, Scotland, connecting Eyemouth with Burnmouth on the East Coast Main Line.

It was built by a local company, but they struggled to raise money, and the line was in effect funded by local wealthy businessmen. It opened in 1891.

In 1948, the viaduct that carried the line over the Eye Water was partly undermined as a result of heavy rainfall, and the line was closed for a year while repairs were undertaken. The line later succumbed to road competition, and it closed in 1962.

== Formation ==
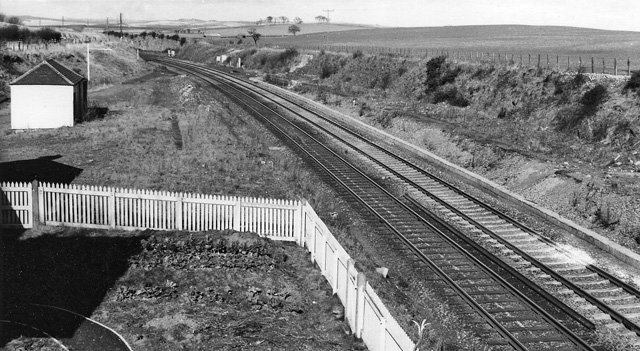
Burnmouth Station, where the Eyemouth Railway left the main line (1970)

As early as 1846, when the North British Railway was in the earliest stages of its railway operation, representatives of the village of Eyemouth requested a branch line connection. At this period the North British was hugely committed financially and was concentrating on securing territory that might be attractive for competing railway companies to enter. Eyemouth did not fall into this category and the request was declined.

In 1864 the request was repeated; the NBR was similarly committed and responded coldly that they were prepared to work the line for 50% of gross receipts if local interests constructed it. Nothing was done.

In the aftermath of the Eyemouth disaster of 1881, in which 189 fishermen perished at sea in a storm, there was a mood locally to improve the village's economy. This was to be done by improving the harbour and connecting the village to the nearby main line network. The Harbour was extended to 9.5 acres and deepened by two feet, and the middle pier was constructed. This work was decided upon at once and was carried out in 1885 - 1887.

The railway connection was to the North British Railway main line between Edinburgh and Berwick-upon-Tweed, which ran nearby, and there was a station at Burnmouth, three miles away. The fishing fleet's catch, and the imported mussel bait, all had to be carted from Burnmouth.

Six local people met on 13 October 1881 to consider the matter, and they decided to build a railway without directly involving the larger concern. A public meeting a week later supported the idea, but actually raising the money for a line proved difficult. The Eyemouth Railway was incorporated by Certificate of the Board of Trade (Note: The BoT certificate was a streamlined method of authorising railways where no compulsory purchase or interference with statutory rights was involved; it had been enabled by the Railway Construction Facilities Act, 1864.) on 18 August 1884. Once more the North British Railway agreed to work the line for 50% of gross receipts, with the Eyemouth company obliged to pay for the junction and other alterations at Burnmouth. The lack of money continued to be an obstacle, and the Directors, all local men without railway experience, disputed among themselves the choice of route, even though it had been determined in their Act, and the Board failed to start work.

== Construction ==
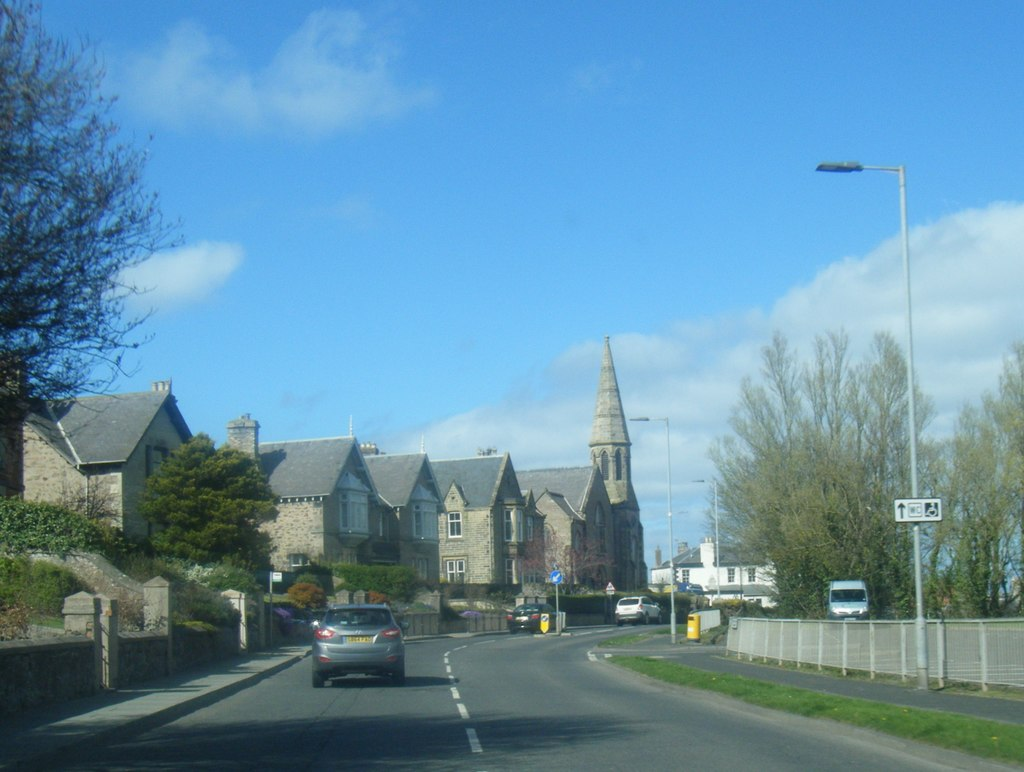
Site of Eyemouth Station (2018)

A means of reducing the capital required for the line to £22,000 was found with the help of G. B. Wieland of the North British Railway, in 1884, but even so share subscription was not forthcoming, and on 30 April 1889 the company's Parliamentary deposit of £2,400 was forfeited. Its plight moved Sir James Percy Miller, 2nd Baronet, who lived locally and was a director of the North British, to take shares, as did Lord Tweeddale, and Wieland became Company Secretary.

A working agreement with the NBR was confirmed, and construction of the 2.97-mile line began in July, from a junction at Burnmouth, running parallel to the main line for half a mile before turning coastward. An ill-timed explosive blast at the junction works almost derailed the Flying Scotsman on 24 October. It was built as a light railway, the only substantial engineering work being a high seven-arch viaduct over the Eye.

Blasting operation on the construction damaged the engine of the Up Flying Scotsman:

Burnmouth: Accident on the Railway. On Thursday morning, the Flying Scotsman, which leaves Edinburgh for Berwick at 10 o'clock, met with an alarming accident near Burnmouth Station. It appears that blasting operations were being conducted on the new Eyemouth railway, where it converges with the North British system, and that a blast occurred just as the Scotsman approached, It was too late to put up a signal against her, and she came into contact with the material thrown up on to the line by the blast. the engine was considerably damaged, but, fortunately it and the remainder of the train kept on the rails. At Berwick, which was reached about half-an-hour late, the engine had to be changed.

== Opening ==
The North British took a 999-year lease at a guaranteed 4% on the company's capital in March 1891, and the line opened on 13 April 1891.

There was a passenger train service of six trains each way daily. The local promoters wished the railway to reach directly to the harbour, but this would have required passing through the village at considerable expense, and the NBR declined to build the extension. In 1894 the Harbour Trustees entered a Parliamentary Bill for further improvements to the harbour, and they included authorisation for the NBR to subscribe up to £60,000 to the works, "in respect of the advantages derived by [the NBR] from the harbour". The NBR did not contribute.

The North British Railway negotiated with the treasury and secured the return of the forfeited deposit of 1889.

Seaside holidays in picturesque locations were becoming fashionable, and the railway brought the village a significant income from holidaymakers. The fortunes of the railway itself showed a gradual increase, and passenger income in 1913 was £2,498, rising to £12,102 in 1920. Goods receipts were £1,628 (1913) and £4,278 (1920).

Short branch railways worked by, and leased by a dominant network company rarely lasted long, and the Eyemouth Railway was absorbed by the North British Railway by Act of 1 August 1900.

== Flooding in 1948 ==
There was an exceptional rainstorm in August 1948; heavy rain started on Wednesday 11 August, and in 24 hours from 10 a.m. that day 4.6 inches of rain fell. The East Coast Main Line railway was breached, and a blocked culvert at Ayton impounded a huge volume of floodwater on land above the line, leading to fears for Eyemouth if the water suddenly became released. The centre pier of the Eye Water viaduct was "carried away" by the volume of water in the Eye watercourse.

The line was reopened after the construction of a replacement pier on 29 June 1949.

== Closure ==
The development of modern roads and of road transport for goods and for passengers caused a decline in the use of the short line from the 1930s, and on 5 February 1962 it closed to all traffic.

== Topography ==
Eyemouth Railway
Overview
- Locale: Scotland
- Dates of operation: 18 August 1884–6 August 1900
- Successor: North British Railway

Technical
- Track gauge: 4 ft 8 1/2 in (1,435 mm)
- Length: 3 miles (4.8 km)

The 2.97 mile long branch left the main line at Burnmouth in a westerly direction, running parallel to the main line for half a mile, and then turning north and following the eastern slope of the valley of the Eye Water as far as Nettlyburn, where it crossed to the west side and ran down into Eyemouth, where there was a small terminus station, with a single platform, run round road and two goods sidings.

The Eye Water viaduct, crossing also the mill leat of the Eyemouth Milling Company, was 60 feet (18 m) high, with six 50 feet (15 m) wrought iron lattice girder spans, resting on brick-faced concrete piers. The central pier was undermined in the 1948 flood and collapsed, though the girders remained in place. Its replacement was sunk 30 feet (9.1 m) into the gravel and also built of brick with a concrete filling, after diverting the river into a new channel near the third pier. Two other piers were also given extra protection.

== See also ==
- "Railscot on the Eyemouth Railway Company".
- "Eyemouth Railway Company Line on a 1947 OS Map".
- 1955 one-inch map of the area
- Facebook page with photographs and timetables
- 1920 postcard of Eyemouth station
