= Herring Queen Festival =

Annual festival held in Scotland

The Eyemouth Herring Queen Festival celebrated in Eyemouth in the Scottish Borders, owes its origins to what was called the Peace Picnic or Fisherman's Picnic which was organised to celebrate the end of World War I.

The first person to be crowned Herring Queen was Mary Craig who retained the title until 1946 due the festival not taking place during World War II. Originally the Herring Queen was chosen due to their success in school. This changed to a popular vote and then changed again in 2001 to a panel of judges. To be eligible candidates must be in year three at Eyemouth High School, have previously attended Eyemouth Primary School and has to have lived in Eyemouth for over 10 years. The Herring Queen represents the town at civic events throughout the year and helps to raise money for charity.

== See also ==
- Fishing industry in Scotland
