= Burnmouth =

Village in Scottish Borders, Scotland

Coordinates: 55°50′32″N 2°04′30″W

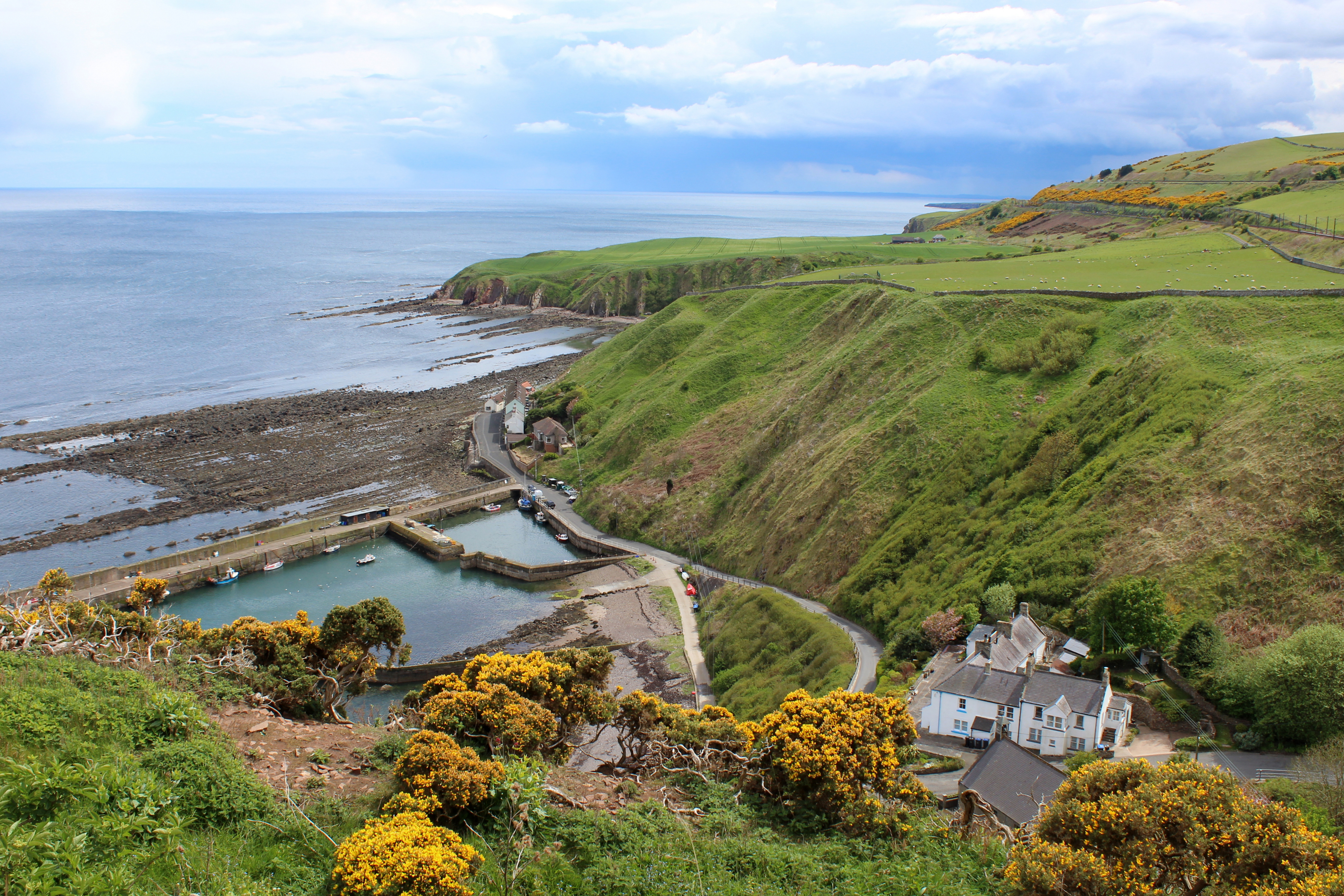
- View over Lower Burnmouth

- Location within the Scottish Borders
- OS grid reference: NT953608
- Civil parish: Ayton
- Council area: Scottish Borders
- Lieutenancy area: Berwickshire
- Country: Scotland
- Sovereign state: United Kingdom
- Post town: Eyemouth
- Postcode district: TD14
- Police: Scotland
- Fire: Scottish
- Ambulance: Scottish
- UK Parliament: Berwickshire, Roxburgh and Selkirk
- Scottish Parliament: Ettrick, Roxburgh and Berwickshire

Burnmouth is a small fishing village located adjacent to the A1 road on the east coast of Scotland. It is the first village in Scotland on the A1, after crossing the border with England. Burnmouth lies in the parish of Ayton in Berwickshire, part of the Scottish Borders.

Burnmouth lies at the point where a burn slices through the high cliffs lining this coast en route to the sea. There may have been a mill here in the Middle Ages, but little else until a fishing harbour was built in the 1830s, later extended in 1879 and 1959. The East Coast Main Line railway passes along the top of the cliff here, and was once served by Burnmouth railway station from 1846 to 1962. The Berwickshire Coastal Path is nearby.

Burnmouth itself is split into two areas: Upper Burnmouth and Lower Burnmouth. Upper Burnmouth is sited at the top of the cliff. Lower Burnmouth is hidden away at the foot of cliff and stretches out along the foreshore.

Lower Burnmouth is further split into four smaller communities: Lower Burnmouth, Partanhall, Cowdrait and Ross. Lower Burnmouth sits beside the harbour and Partanhall is located to the north. Cowdrait is located to the south of the harbour. The tiny community of Ross is located just south of Cowdrait. Ross, which now consists of only six houses, was once considered a separate community, as it lies just across the parish boundary, in the parish of Mordington.

Burnmouth has a small church sited halfway down the Brae (the road which ascends the cliff between Lower and Upper Burnmouth). Until 2005, the village had a small primary school. Burnmouth had two pubs – the Flemington Inn and the Gulls Nest (now called the First and Last) – which were sited next to each other adjacent to the A1 road. The Flemington Inn had signs on the north and south gables proclaiming to passing motorists that that pub was "the last inn Scotland" and "the first inn Scotland". In February 2006 the Flemington was gutted by fire and the building was later demolished.

Burnmouth lost 24 fishermen, drowned, in the 1881 Eyemouth Disaster. This is commemorated on a bronze plaque mounted on the harbour wall.

Burnmouth hosts an annual bike race, known as the "Brae Race" which takes place every May. The course consists of the steep road which ascends the cliff from lower to upper Burnmouth.

== Gallery ==
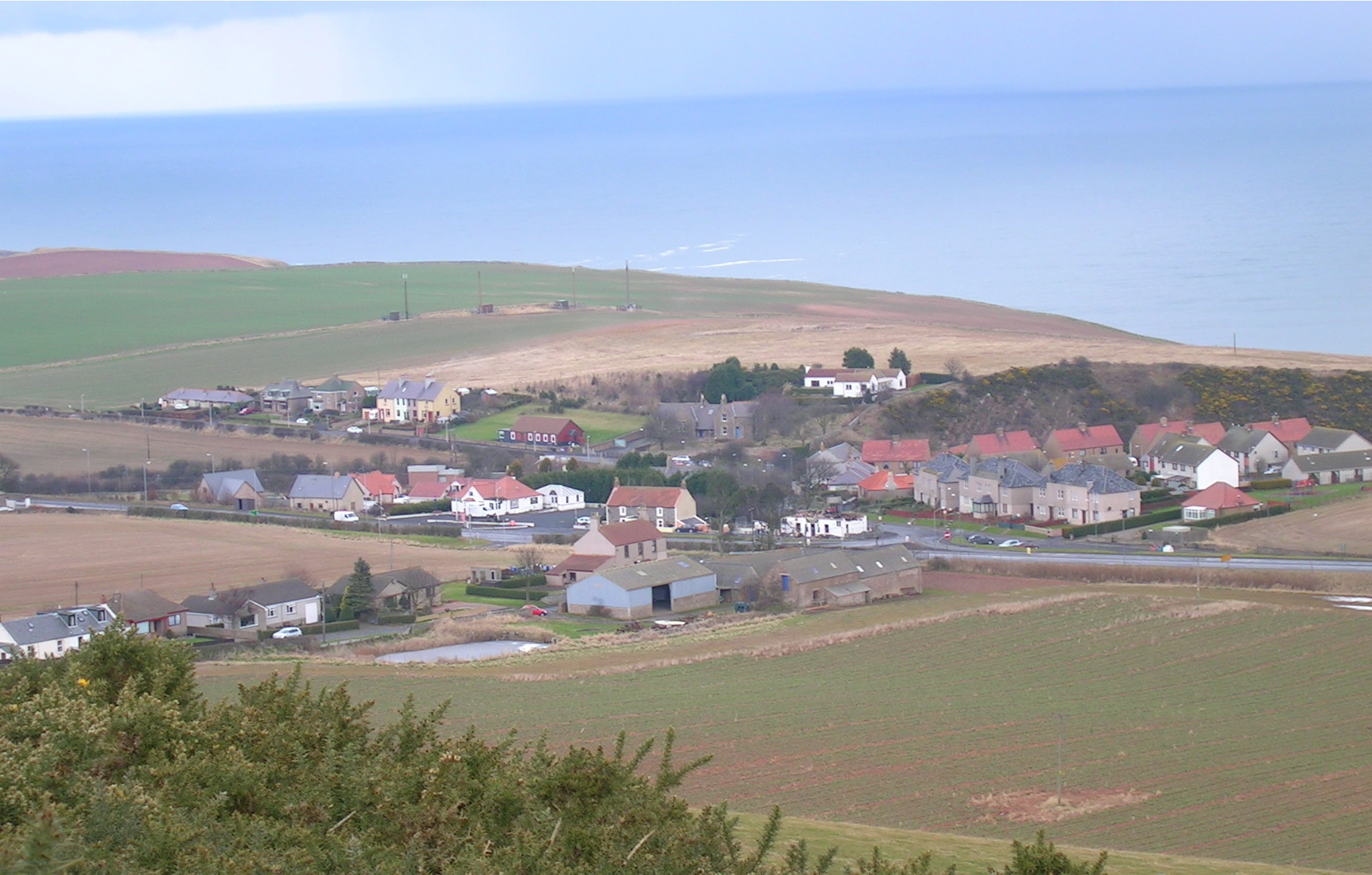
Upper Burnmouth

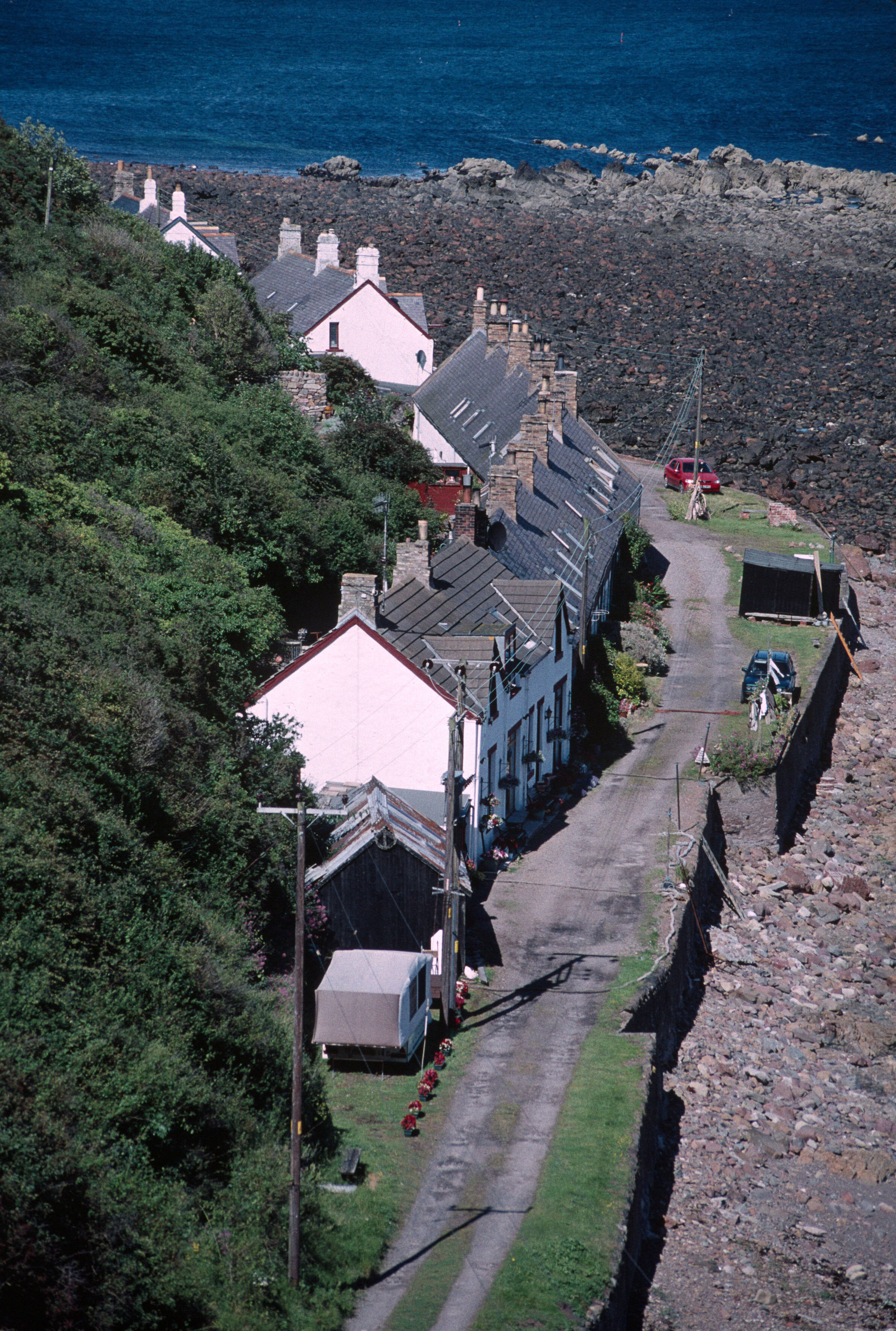
Partanhall

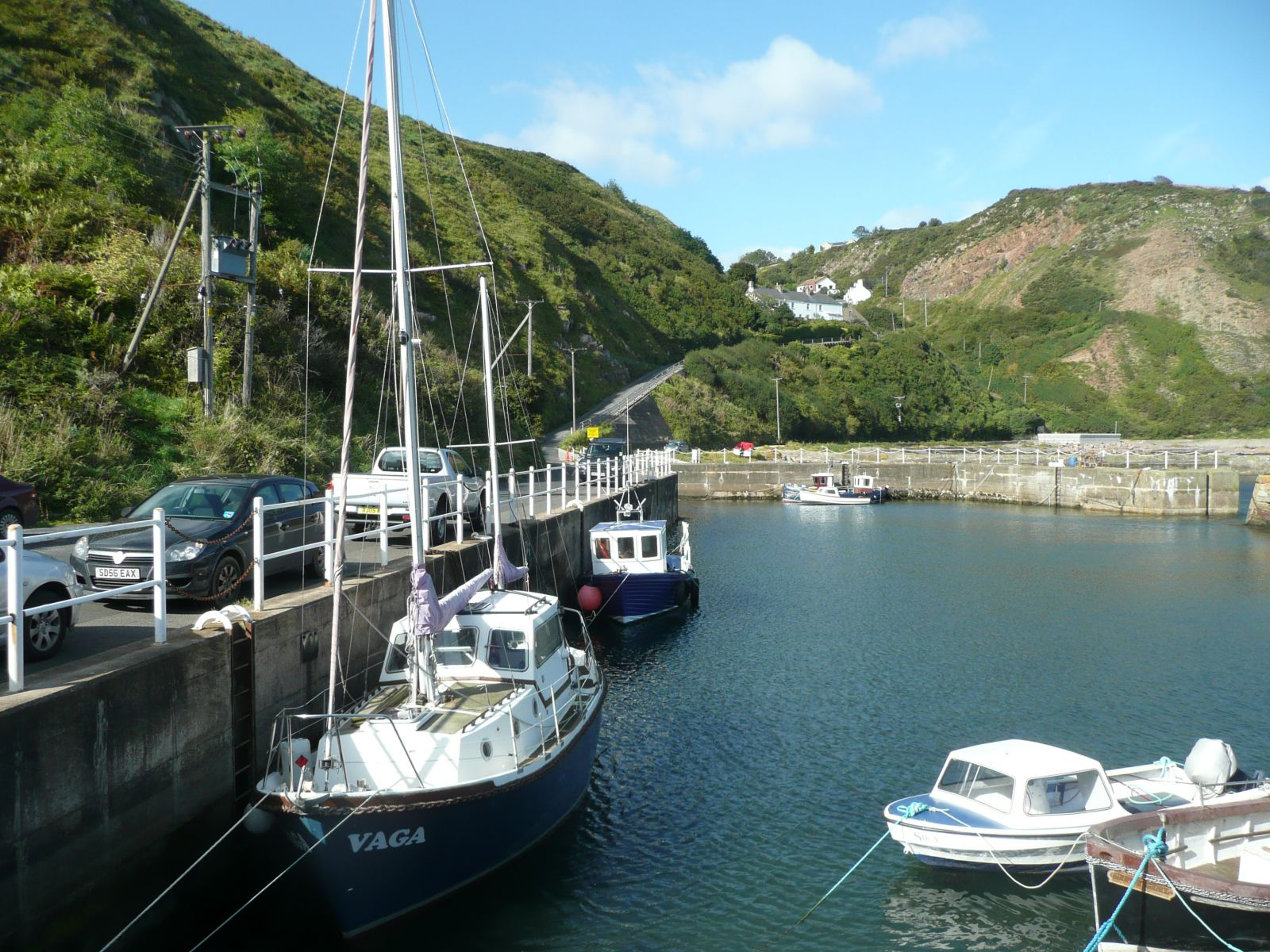
The harbour

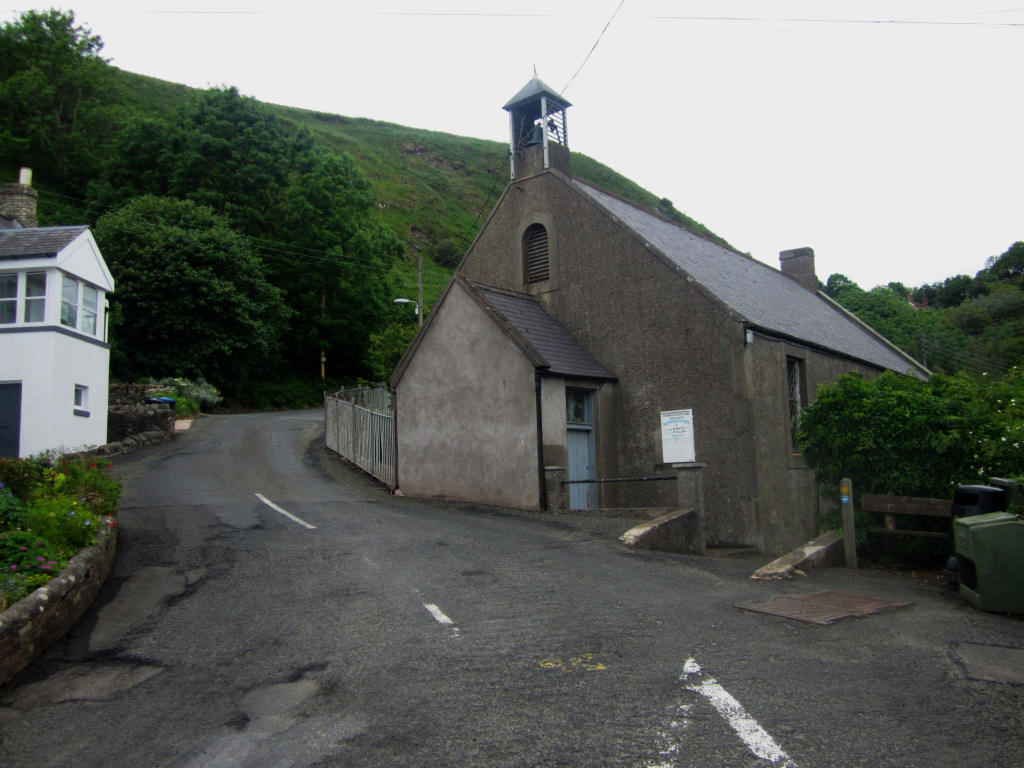
Burnmouth Kirk, now disused

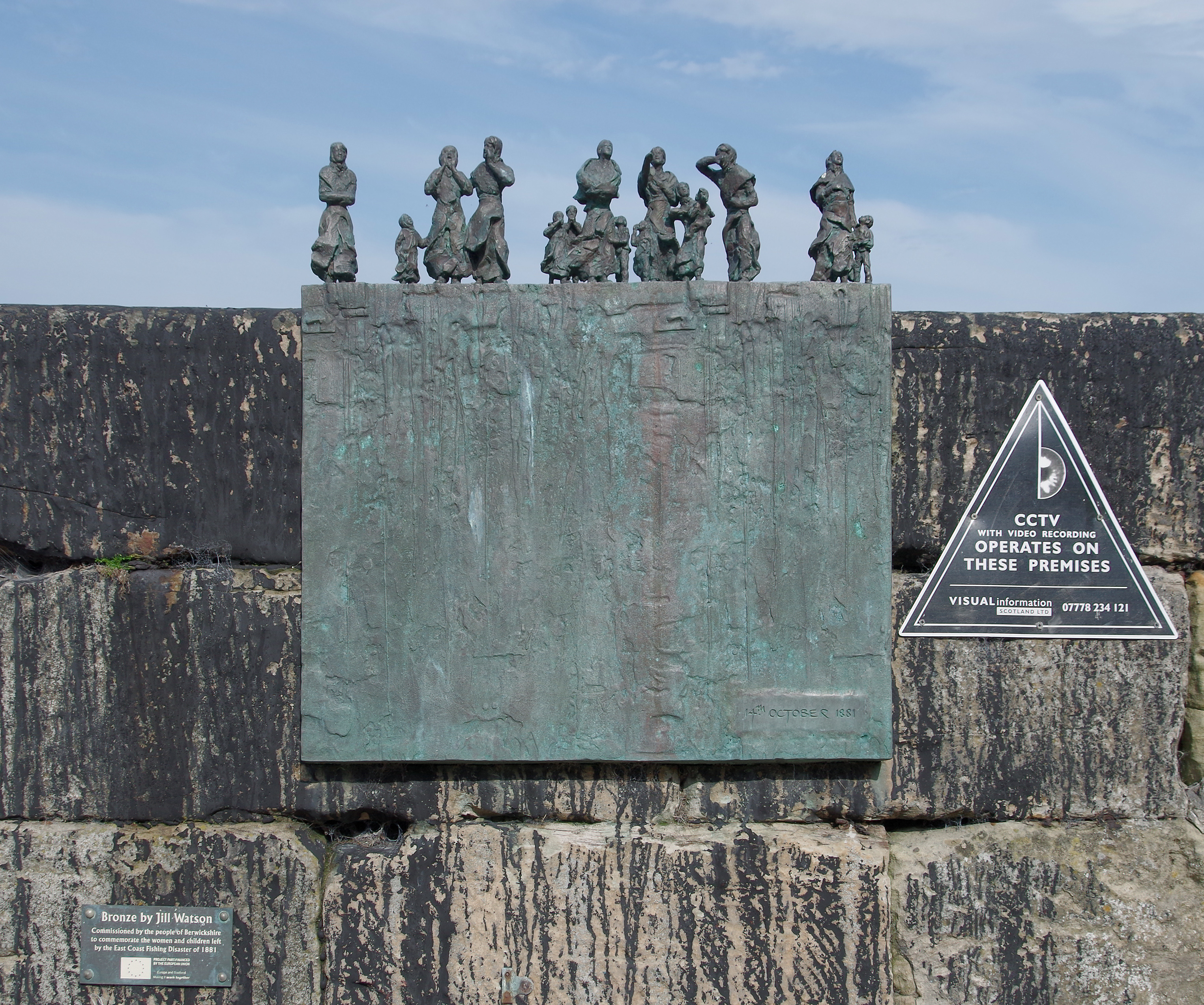
Plaque on the harbour wall commemorating the victims of the Eyemouth Disaster

== See also ==
- List of places in the Scottish Borders
