= Marjory Dougal =

Scottish youth orchestra administrator (1943–2020)

- Born: 24 April 1943; Eyemouth Berwickshire
- Died: 15 December 2020 (aged 77); Edinburgh, Scotland
- Known for: Youth orchestra administration
- Spouse: Richard Dougal

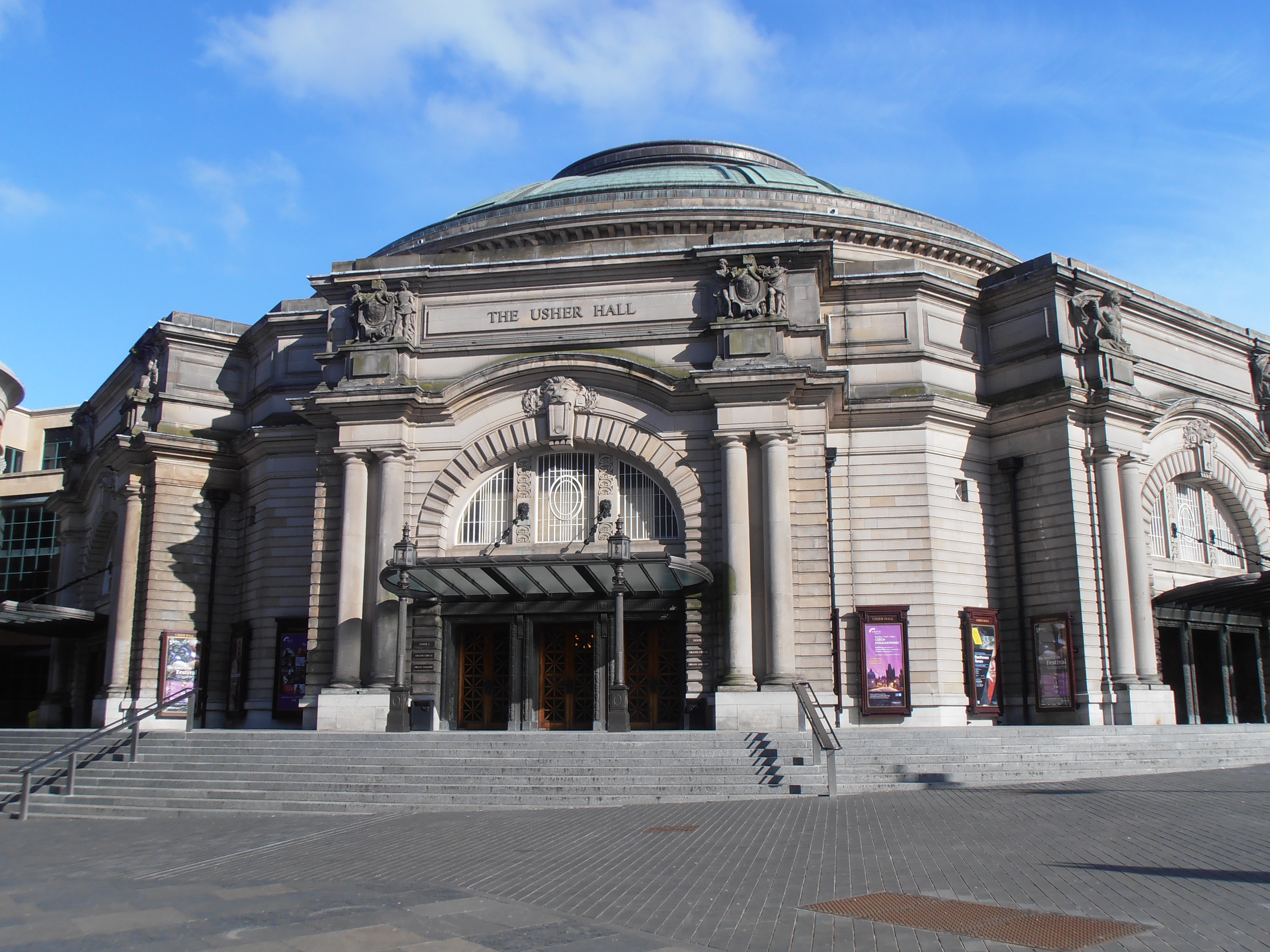
Usher Hall Edinburgh

Marjory Dougal (24 April 1943 - 15 December 2020) was a highly respected and influential administrator and vice-president of the Edinburgh Youth Orchestra for thirty years.

== Early life ==
Marjory was born in Eyemouth in Berwickshire in 1943. She married Richard Dougal, who lectured at the University of Edinburgh, and they settled in Edinburgh where, during the 1970s and 1980s she was a learning support teacher in Edinburgh primary schools in places in the town such as Sciennes, Tollcross and South Morningside. Although not a professional musician, Marjory loved music and played the piano, so she took the opportunity to establish recorder and other music groups in these schools. Marjory encouraged her daughter Fiona and son Ian to learn to play musical instruments, and they both became involved with the Edinburgh Youth Orchestra. In 1989, when the EYO concert tour of California was completed, and she learned of a vacancy for an orchestral manager, she successfully applied for the job, and retired from teaching.

== Career ==
From the time of her appointment to the EYO in 1990, she championed the musical development of talented children. She believed that all children should have equal opportunities no matter their background, in keeping with her lifelong Labour principles. Her daughter Fiona said her mother would "find the money" to support children who struggled to pay their fees."

The EYO toured abroad, and attracted attention from famous musicians and conductors. When possible Scottish composers' works were played, and famous Scottish instrumentalists performed with the orchestra. On a concert tour of the Baltic in 2003, the orchestra was conducted on its Estonian leg by the RSNO emeritus conductor Neeme Järvi, played a specially commissioned work by the Scottish composer Edward McGuire, and included famous Scottish musicians such as percussionist Evelyn Glennie and saxophonist Tommy Smith.

Edinburgh Youth Orchestra prospered under her directorship, performing symphonies by Sibelius, Tchaikovsky and Shostakovich, concertos by Richard Strauss, Elgar and Beethoven, difficult pieces such as Mahler's Symphony No.1 and Stravinsky's Rite of spring.

In the 50th anniversary gala concert in 2013, held at the Usher Hall, the orchestra drew on its alumni to field 135 players, and was jointly conducted by En Shao and by two internationally famous Scottish conductors, Donald Runnicles and Garry Walker. Among the works performed was Veni, Veni Emmanuel for percussion and orchestra, by the Scottish composer James MacMillan, with Evelyn Glennie as percussionist, Beethoven's Violin concerto, Wagner's Der Meistersingers Overture, and the Elgar Cello concerto, which was performed by Julian Lloyd Webber.

== Legacy ==
Dougal was instrumental in fostering talented young musicians by giving them opportunities to play challenging music both old and new with world-class conductors and soloists, both in Scotland and abroad in concert tours. Some of these young musicians went on to have careers as acclaimed performers. She remained active in promoting the orchestra as its vice-president even after her retirement in 2017. She promoted young musicians in Scotland for three decades. She fostered the talents of such musicians as percussionist Colin Currie, composer Anna Meredith, Philip Higham, the principal cellist for the Scottish Chamber Orchestra, violinist Daniel Bell, and conductor Garry Walker. She was successful in promoting the orchestra and in making sure that it was noticed by the media and reviewed in National newspapers. Evelyn Glennie is quoted as saying "Without her vision, perseverance and belief the EYO would not be where it is today or have given the thousands of youngsters the invaluable, long-lasting experience of their lives".
