= Eyemouth disaster =

October 1881 weather disaster in Scotland

Coordinates: 55.870°N 2.091°W

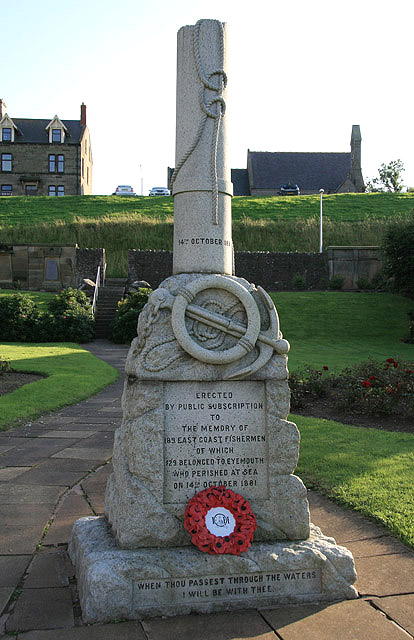
The granite memorial in Eyemouth, depicting a broken sailing mast

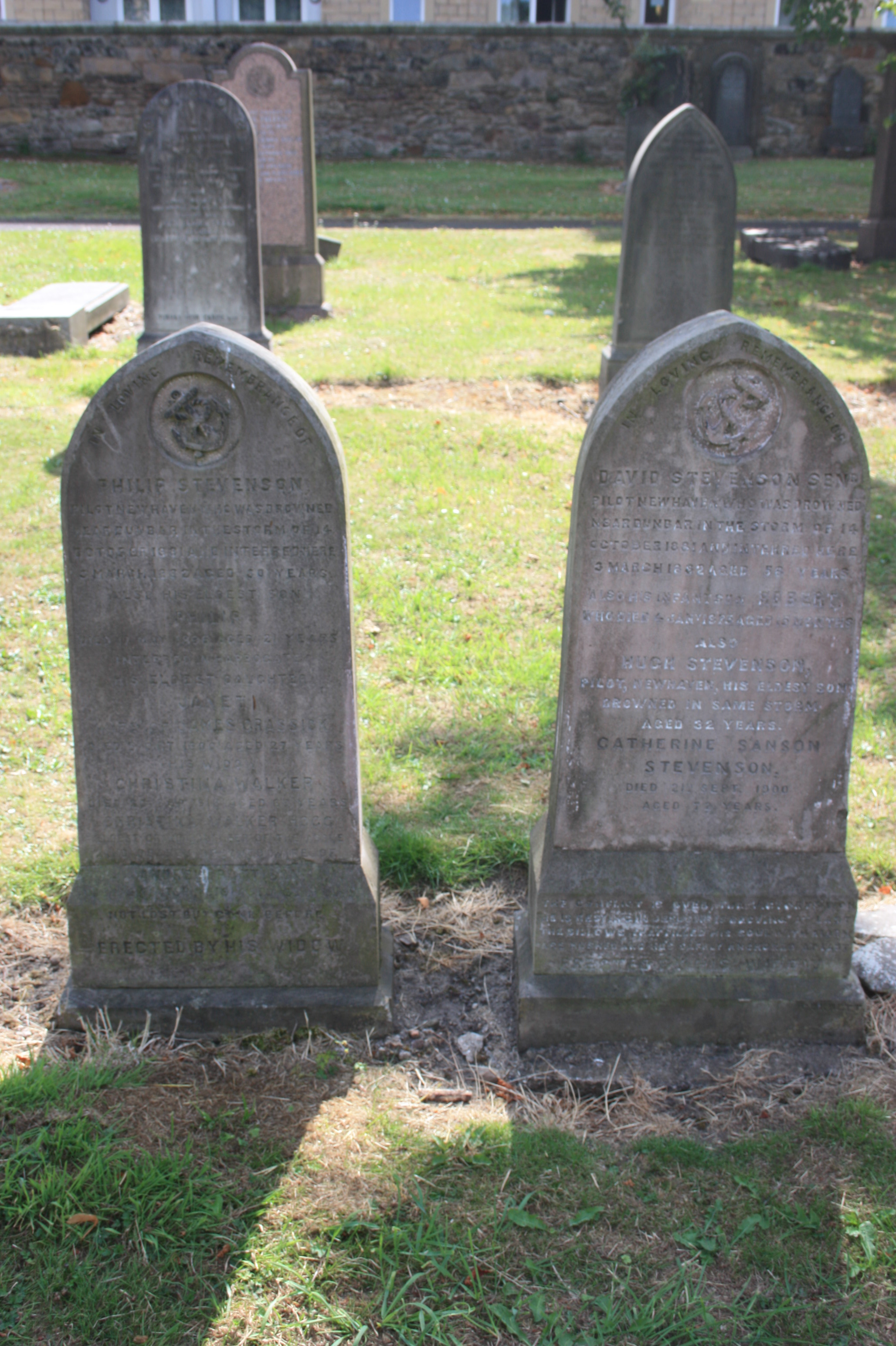
The paired grave of members of the Stevenson family from Newhaven, drowned in the Eyemouth disaster and washed up the following spring, Rosebank Cemetery in Edinburgh

The Eyemouth disaster was a severe European windstorm that struck the south-eastern coast of Scotland on 14 October 1881. One hundred and eighty-nine fishermen, most of whom were from Eyemouth, were drowned. Many citizens of Eyemouth call the day Black Friday.

== Disaster ==
Following a period of poor weather, the morning of 14 October was calm. Though the storm was predicted (as the barometric pressure was very low), the fishing fleets put to sea through economic necessity.

Many of the fishing boats were either capsized, or wrecked against the coastline. John Doull, from the Fishery Office in Eyemouth, hypothesized that there were so many casualties because many ships could not see the land due to the storm, and they sailed too close to land and thus were smashed against the rocks without being able to safely make it back out to sea or into the port. Additionally, many of the ships did not have their ballast stowed properly, which exacerbated damage or sunk ships due to it being thrown around the hold during the storm.

== Casualties ==
- Eyemouth - 129
- Burnmouth - 24
- Newhaven - 17
- Cove - 11
- Fisherrow - 7
- Coldingham Shore - 3

Some boats that had not capsized were wrecked on the Hurkar Rocks. Many houses were also destroyed. Two days later, the Ariel Gazelle turned up in Eyemouth, having braved the storm instead of fleeing.

== Aftermath ==
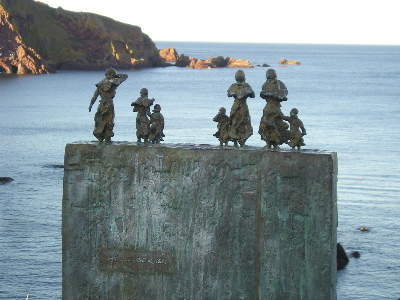
The bronze memorial at St Abbs - figures of women and children look out to sea. Similar memorials can be found at other towns effected.

A donation-led relief fund was established to provide financial security to families who had lost members to the storm. The response was significant, bringing in over £50,000 (£4,240,000 in 2021). Widows could collect five shillings a week unless they remarried, and an additional two shillings and sixpence for each child currently attending school.

The disaster was the subject of a contemporary oil on canvas painting by Scottish artist J. Michael Brown.

== See also ==
- Moray Firth fishing disaster
