= Eye Water =

River in Scottish Borders, Scotland

Coordinates: 55°52′N 2°05′W

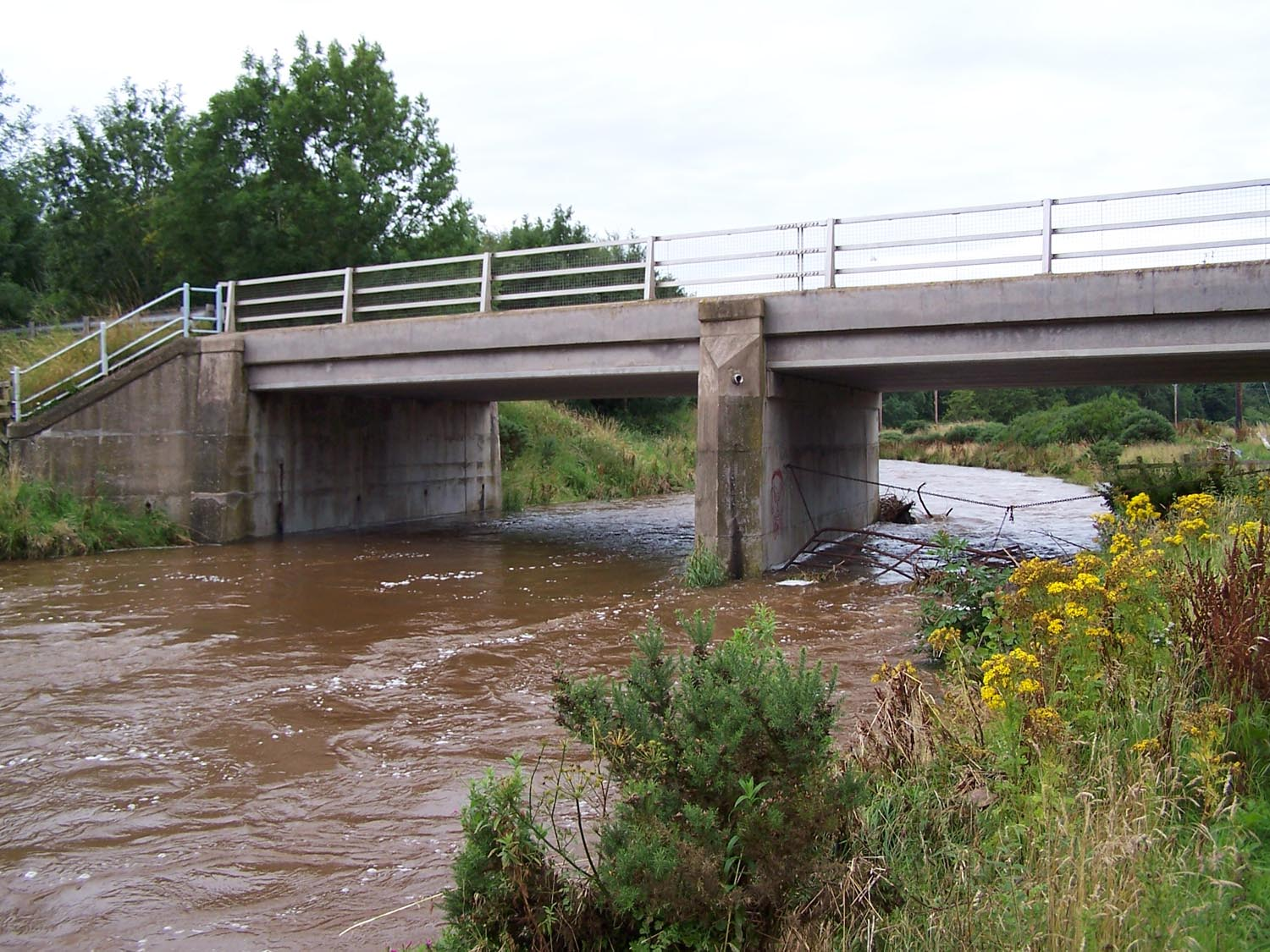
The Eye Water at Reston, flowing under the bridge carrying the B6438 road.

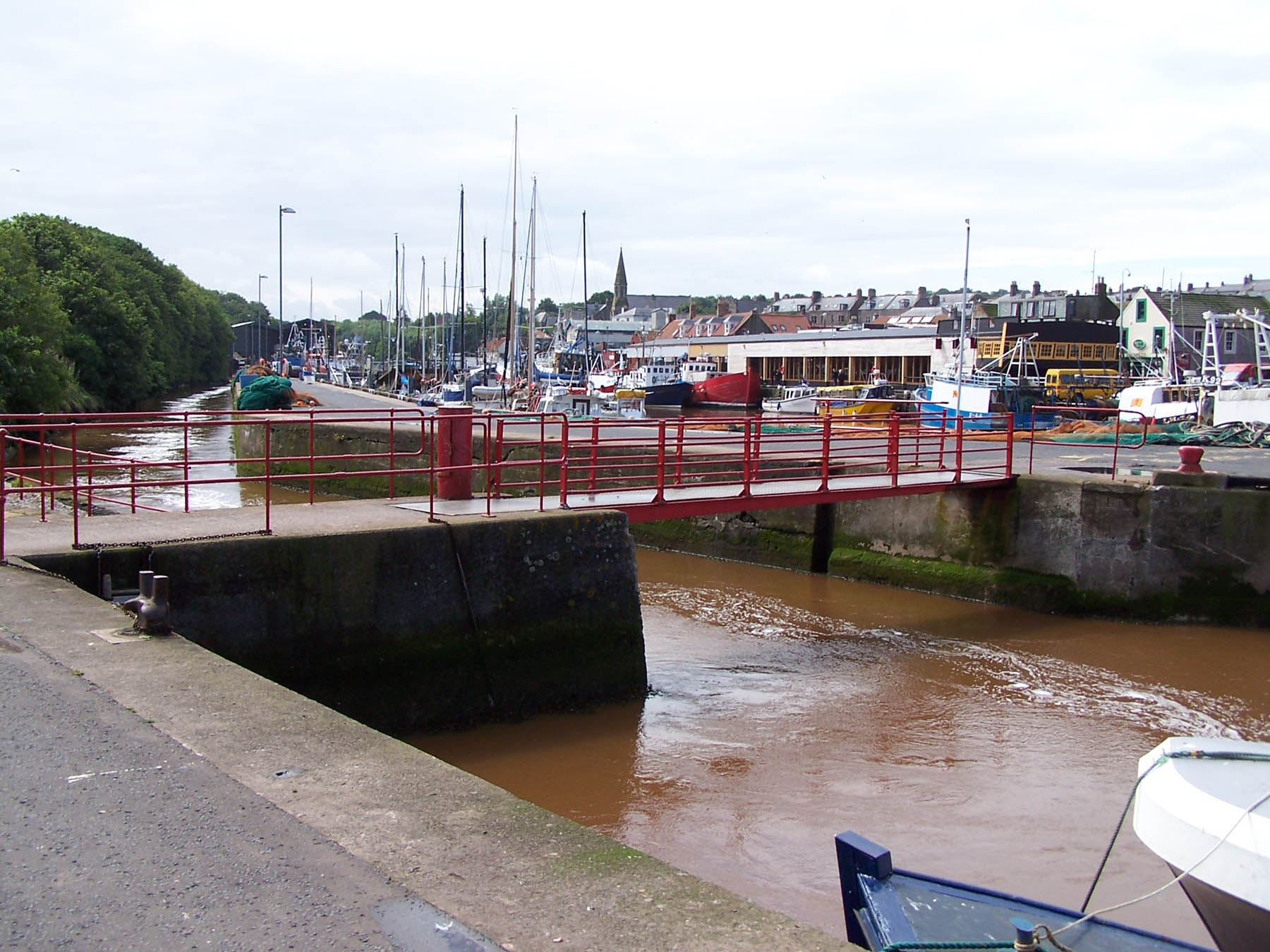
The Eye Water enters Eyemouth harbour, flowing down the channel on the left.

Eye Water is a river in the Scottish Borders, it flows in a general southeasterly direction from its source in the Lammermuir Hills to its estuary at Eyemouth on the east coast of Scotland, having a length of approximately 35 kilometres (22 mi).

== River course ==
The Eye Water rises on the eastern slopes of Wester Dod at height of 375 metres, it flows SE for 10 km before swinging NE for three km to reach the village of Grantshouse. The Eye Water flows on the southern outskirts of Grantshouse as it again turns SE and runs in a valley between Horseley Hill and Dalks Law alongside the A1 road and the East Coast Main Line railway. The river keeps to the SW side of the A1 passing through the villages of Reston and Ayton where it flows through a pleasant wooded valley on the Ayton Castle estate. The estate was planted with parkland trees when the present Scottish baronial style castle was built in 1851 and many of these remain around the river banks although part of the park has since been planted with mixed woodland.

The stretch of the river from Ayton onward previously had some pollution problems as a quantity of sewage effluent from the village of Ayton and Eymouth contaminated the Water. However, in 2005 Scottish Water completed work which collected the sewage from the villages and pumped it directly to the sewage treatment works at Eyemouth on the coast. At Ayton the Eye Water swings NNE for the final five km leg to its estuary. It runs under the A1 road in a wooded gorge and then receives its largest tributary on its northern bank, the Ale Water which rises on Coldingham Moor 10 km to the NW. The Eye Water enters Eyemouth where it flows on the east side of the harbour, with a stone built quay keeping it separate and forming the river's west bank before the Water eventually enters the harbour lower down near the life boat station.

== 1948 flood ==
On 12 August 1948 the Berwickshire region was hit by a calamitous flood when one third of the annual rainfall fell in just six days. The water flowed off the Lammermuir Hills causing the Eye Water and other rivers of the area to overflow and cause much damage. The low lying farm land around Ayton was turned into a large lake with the 18 metres (60 ft) high embankment of the ECML railway acting as a dam. There were fears that the embankment would break and Eyemouth would be inundated. The embankment did hold but Eyemouth still received some damage, with reports saying that gales and the impact of the overflowing Eye Water had the “impact of a hurricane”. The flood caused the closure of the local Eyemouth Railway from 13 August 1948 to 29 June of the next year. Between Reston and Granthouse 7 railway bridges were washed away. Those on the ECML were replaced by military bridges, allowing goods trains to resume on 25 October and passenger on 1 November 1948. The temporary bridges weren't finally replaced until 21 May 1950.

== See also ==
- List of places in the Scottish Borders
- List of places in Scotland
- List of rivers of Scotland
