= Ayton, Scottish Borders =

Village in Scottish Borders, Scotland

Coordinates: 55.842515°N 2.123012°W

Ayton
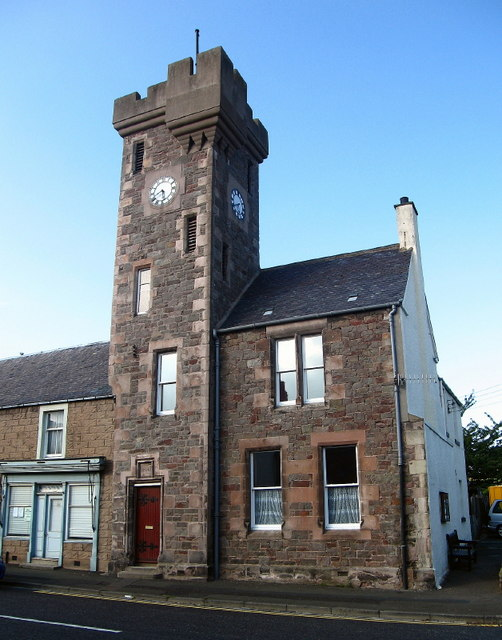
- Clock Tower House, Ayton

- Location within the Scottish Borders
- Population: 600 (2020)
- OS grid reference: NT923610
- Council area: Scottish Borders
- Lieutenancy area: Berwickshire
- Country: Scotland
- Sovereign state: United Kingdom
- Post town: EYEMOUTH
- Postcode district: TD14
- Dialling code: 01890
- Police: Scotland
- Fire: Scottish
- Ambulance: Scottish
- UK Parliament: Berwickshire, Roxburgh and Selkirk
- Scottish Parliament: Ettrick, Roxburgh and Berwickshire

Ayton is a small village located in the historic county of Berwickshire, today part of the Scottish Borders region. It is on the Eye Water, from which it is said to take its name: Ayton means 'Eye-town'. It contains the former ancient tollbooth or town hall with a clock tower, the Hemelvaart Bier Cafe (an entertainment venue as well as a bar) and a village store.

It is located near the East Coast Main Line railway line, which runs between London, King's Cross and Edinburgh, Waverley station, the closest station being Reston station.

The A1 (Great North Road) originally ran through the heart of the village, but during the 1980s a bypass was built to the East of the village. Ayton was the location of a coaching inn on the road between London and Edinburgh.

== Ayton Castle and church ==
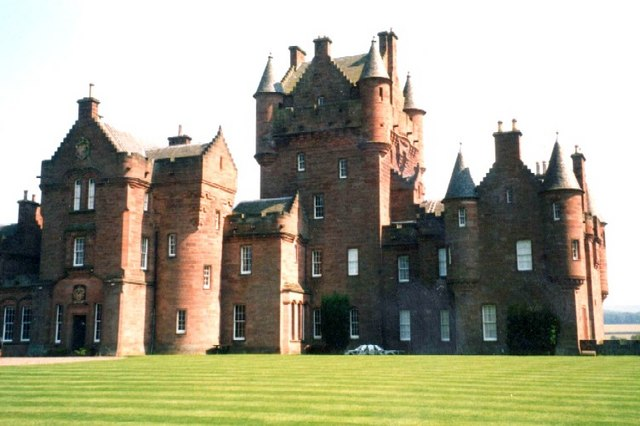
Ayton Castle, built in 1851 in the Scottish Baronial style by William Mitchell-Innes, feudal baron of Ayton, to the design of James Gillespie Graham

The splendid edifice of Ayton Castle, the caput of the Scottish feudal barony of Ayton, dominates the town and district. It is built around a peel tower, a stronghold of the Home family, which burnt down in 1834.

The estate was subsequently purchased by William Mitchell (later Mitchell-Innes) of Parsonsgreen, Edinburgh, Chief Cashier of the Royal Bank of Scotland. From 1846 to 1851 James Gillespie Graham was commissioned to build a new castle at Ayton in the Scottish Baronial style in red sandstone. Further additions were made in the later 19th century. The interiors of the 1875 are still largely extant. William's son, Alexander Mitchell-Innes (1811–1886), commissioned James Maitland Wardrop to build Ayton Parish Church, with a 36-metre (118 ft) spire, and stained glass windows by Ballantine & Sons.

In 1895 the barony of Ayton was sold to Henry Liddell-Grainger of Middleton Hall, Northumberland. His descendant, Ian Liddell-Grainger MP, is the current feudal baron of Ayton, but his younger stepbrother became proprietor of Ayton Castle and sold it in 2015.

== James Boswell ==
The Scottish diarist and author James Boswell, biographer of Samuel Johnson passed through Ayton on his journey to London on 15 November 1762. In his London Journal he recounts "...We did very well till we passed Old Camus, when one of the wheels of our chaise was so much broke that it was of no use. The driver proposed that we should mount the horses and ride to Berwick. But this I would by no means agree to; and as my partner let me be the principal man and take the direction of our journey, I made the chaise be dragged on to Ayton, where we waited till the driver rode to Berwick and brought us a chaise. Never did I pass three hours more unhappily. We were set down in a cold ale-house in a dirty little village. We had a beefsteak ill-dressed and had nothing to drink but thick muddy beer. We were both out of humour so that we could not speak. We tried to sleep but in vain. We only got a drowsy headache. We were scorched by the fire on the one hand and shivering with the frost on the other. At last our chaise came, and we got to Berwick about twelve at night. We had a slice of hard dry toast, a bowl of warm negus (drink), and went comfortable to bed".

== See also ==
- Ayton Castle
- List of places in the Scottish Borders
- List of places in Scotland

== Bibliography ==
- The History of the Royal Bank of Scotland 1727–1827, by Neil Munro, Edinburgh, 1928.
- Borders and Berwick, by Charles A Strang, Rutland Press, 1994, pps: 21–2, ISBN 1-873190-10-7
