= Penmanshiel Tunnel =

Abandoned railway tunnel in Scotland

- Interactive map of Penmanshiel Tunnel

Overview
- Line: East Coast Main Line
- Location: Scottish Borders
- Coordinates: 55.8965°N 2.3274°W
- Status: Disused (abandoned)

Operation
- Constructed: 1845–1846
- Opened: 1846
- Closed: 17 March 1979
- Owner: North British Railway; London & North Eastern Railway; British Rail
- Character: Passenger and freight rail

Technical
- Length: 244 m (267 yd)
- No. of tracks: 2
- Track gauge: 1,435 mm (4 ft 8 1/2 in) standard gauge
- Electrified: No
- Operating speed: 60 mph (97 km/h)

Penmanshiel Tunnel is a now-disused railway tunnel near Grantshouse, Berwickshire, in the Scottish Borders region of Scotland. It was formerly part of the East Coast Main Line between Berwick-upon-Tweed and Dunbar.

The tunnel was constructed between 1845 and 1846 by contractors Ross and Mitchell, to a design by John Miller, who was the engineer to the North British Railway. Upon completion, the tunnel was inspected by the inspector-general of railways, Major-General Charles Pasley, on behalf of the Board of Trade.

The tunnel was 244 metres (267 yd) long, and carried two running lines in a single bore.

During its 134-year existence, the tunnel was the location of two incidents investigated by HM Railway Inspectorate. The first was in 1949, when a serious fire destroyed two carriages of a south-bound express from Edinburgh. Seven passengers were injured, but there were no deaths.

The second incident occurred on 17 March 1979 when, during improvement works, a length of the tunnel suddenly collapsed. Thirteen workers escaped, but two were killed. Later it was determined that it would be too dangerous and difficult to rebuild the tunnel, so it was sealed up and a new alignment was made for the railway, in a cutting to the west of the hill.

The tunnel was also affected by severe flooding in August 1948.

== Flooding (1948) ==
On 12 August 1948, 159 millimetres (6.25 in) of rain fell in the area, the total for the week being 270 mm (10.5 in). Rain falling on the Lammermuir Hills surged into the Eye Water towards Reston, and the channel could not accommodate all of the water. The flood water then backed up the tunnel and flowed to sea in the opposite direction, towards Cockburnspath. The tunnel was flooded to within 610 mm (2 ft) of the crown of the portal.

== Train fire (1949) ==
On the evening of 23 June 1949 a fire broke out in the tenth coach of an express passenger train from Edinburgh to King's Cross, about 2.5 miles (4 km) south of Cockburnspath. The train stopped somewhere near the tunnel, within one and a quarter minutes of the fire starting, but the fire spread rapidly and with such ferocity that, within seconds, the brake-composite carriage was engulfed and the fire had spread to the coach in front. Most passengers escaped by running to the guard's compartment or forwards along the corridor, but some were compelled to break the windows and jump down onto the track. One woman was seriously injured by doing this.

The train crew reacted quickly to the incident. The two coaches behind the two ablaze were uncoupled and pushed back, leaving them isolated up the line. Having drawn forward and uncoupled the two burning vehicles, the driver proceeded with the front eight coaches to Grantshouse station.

The cause of the fire was thought to be a cigarette end or lighted match dropped against a partition in the corridor, the surface of which was found to have been coated with a highly-flammable lacquer. Subsequent analysis of the lacquer indicated that it was composed of nearly 17% nitrocellulose and sustained "startling" combustion. Draughts of air from the open windows may have fanned the flames.

Despite the noxious fumes and the severity of the blaze, which reduced the two carriages to their underframes, only seven passengers were injured, with no fatalities.

== Collapse (1979) ==
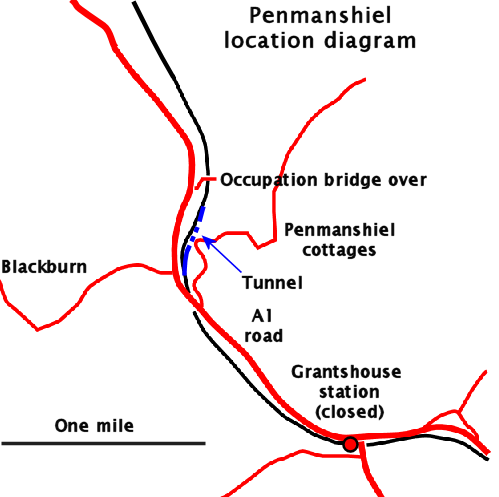
Location diagram for Penmanshiel Tunnel, near Grantshouse in Scotland

The next significant event to occur at the tunnel led to its abandonment.

=== Upgrade works ===
Work was being carried out in March 1979 to increase clearances within the tunnel, so that intermodal containers 8 ft 6 in (2.59 m) in height could be carried through it on flat wagons. This was performed by removing the existing track and ballast, digging out the floor of the tunnel by between 300 and 800 mm (12 and 31 in), and then laying new track on a concrete base at the lower level. Use of concrete base helped reduce the amount by which the floor had to be lowered. (Note: The original 1974 plan called for a maximum lowering of 500 mm (19.7 in), but this increased to 770 mm (30.3 in) in 1977 in order to allow for the line's eventual electrification, and also for the possibility that British Rail's Advanced Passenger Train might one day use the line at a higher speed than the 70 mph (110 km/h) planned for conventional non-tilting trains on that section of line. The average lowering through the entire tunnel was assessed as being 550 mm (21.7 in).) The process was judged to be safe so long as the walls of the tunnel were not undercut in the course of the works.

In order to minimise disruption to both passenger and freight services on the busy main line, it was decided that each of the two tracks through the tunnel would be renewed consecutively rather than concurrently; while one track was closed for lowering, trains could continue to run on the adjacent open track. Work was completed on the "Up" (southbound) track by 10 March 1979, and trains were then transferred to this track by the following day, to allow the "Down" (northbound) track to be modified.

=== Collapse ===
Shortly before 3:45 a.m. on 17 March 1979, the duty railway works inspector noticed some small pieces of rock flaking away from the tunnel wall, 90 m (300 ft) from the southern portal. He decided that it would be wise to shore up the affected piece of the tunnel and was making his way towards the site office to arrange this when he heard the sound of the tunnel collapsing behind him.

It is estimated that approximately 20 m (66 ft) of the tunnel arch collapsed, with the resultant rockfall filling 30 m (98 ft) of the tunnel from floor to roof and burying a dumper truck and an excavator, along with the two men operating them. The 13 other people working inside the tunnel at the time of the collapse were able to escape, but despite the efforts of rescuers (including a specialised mine rescue team) it was not possible to reach the two operators or to recover their bodies.

=== Official report ===
External images
- South Portal of Penmanshiel Tunnel, 25 March 1979. Photograph taken from a passing vehicle eight days after the collapse.
- North Portal of Penmanshiel Tunnel, 1979. Photograph taken later in 1979, showing the tunnel mouth boarded up and the approach cutting partially filled in.

An official HM Railway Inspectorate report was prepared by Lieutenant Colonel I. K. A. McNaughton and released on 2 August 1983. The report concluded that, without access to the collapsed portion of the tunnel, it was impossible to be certain as to the "actual cause" of the collapse.

Neither the tunnel's history, nor its condition immediately prior to commencement of the works, had given any significant cause for concern, and it was noted that workers had "paid particular attention" to the state of the tunnel walls throughout the works; "at no time" had any cracks or fractures been observed. The need to avoid undercutting the side walls during the excavation of the floor had also been observed with "great care", and a series of monitoring measurements taken periodically across the tunnel – using nails that had been machine-driven into the walls at 10-metre (33 ft) intervals especially for this purpose – had not revealed any movement. The inspectorate found that the works on site "[appeared] to have been carried out with proper care and foresight", and that there was no evidence to suggest that the side walls of tunnel had been subjected to excessive force or vibration during the upgrade works.

Investigations into the remaining tunnel structure, particularly that adjacent to the collapsed area, revealed inconsistencies in the tunnel's construction. "Windows" cut through the brickwork by investigators showed that the crown of the arch was generally of sufficient thickness, but that this thickness tapered off through the haunches where the arch transitioned into the side walls. Other windows exposed cavities and voids in the rock behind the brickwork, some of which were filled with loose rock. On the whole these findings were inconclusive. (Note: The presence of some voiding above the arch had been known of since the tunnel was first constructed, because it was normal practice at that time for tunnels to "overbreak" (that is, be excavated wider and taller than planned). The arch ring would then be built as designed, leaving a gap between the ring and the overlying rock.) Tests conducted on samples of brickwork showed it, and the associated mortar, to be of reasonable strength; confirming observations made during the cutting of the samples, and also reports from repair works that had been conducted on the tunnel in the past.

Geotechnical investigations into the surrounding hillside found evidence suggesting fracturing of the rock overlying the tunnel, but this was not thought to be definitive. Only during excavation of the cutting for the bypass alignment did the "most revealing" piece of evidence become available: a detailed geological survey of the hill along the line of the cutting exposed an anticlinal structure of shattered and sheared rock that was found to intersect the line of the tunnel near the area of the collapse.

The report concluded that the collapse was likely the result of degeneration of the rock within the anticlinal structure overlying the tunnel, which progressively—but inconsistently—increased the loading on the tunnel's brick arch ring in a way that could not adequately be distributed into the surrounding hillside. The existence of the anticline would almost certainly never have been confirmed without the excavation of the bypass cutting, and it was considered "most unlikely" that the "extreme complexity" of the geology could ever have been appreciated by investigation of rock exposed in the tunnel or through other routine investigatory techniques.

It was further noted that the degeneration of the overlying rock had made the tunnel "dangerously unstable" for many years prior to the collapse, and that the collapse would most probably have occurred at some time or another regardless of whether or not the enlargement works had been undertaken. The investigation thought it likely that the works contributed to the timing of the collapse, in that the already overloaded tunnel walls could not tolerate the slight increase in stress placed upon them by the excavation of the tunnel floor.

Finally the report stated that—as the conditions leading to the collapse could not reasonably be foreseen—there were no grounds for finding any individual responsible for the accident. Despite this the British Railways Board was charged in the High Court of Justiciary at Edinburgh with breaching the Health and Safety at Work etc. Act 1974 by "having failed to do all that was reasonably practical to ensure that persons in the tunnel were not exposed to the risk of personal injury by the collapse of part of the [tunnel] structure", on the basis that a full geotechnical survey—whether futile or not—had not been conducted prior to the works commencing. The Board entered a guilty plea and was fined £10,000.

== Bypass ==
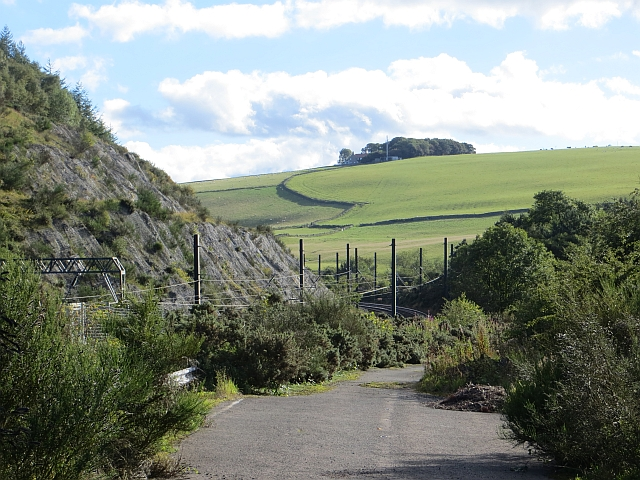
A section of the original A1 severed by the realignment of the railway. This view looks southwards, with the new railway running in cutting to the left, and the new road alignment out-of-shot to the right.

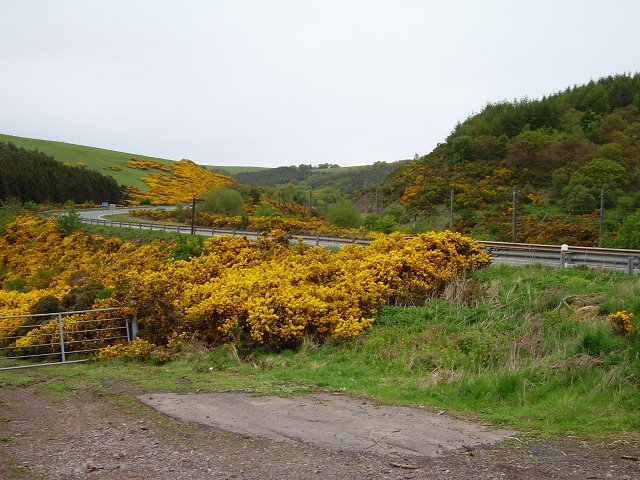
The new alignments, looking northwards. The railway runs in cutting at the centre of the photograph, while the location of the tunnel's southern portal is slightly out-of-shot to the right.

In the aftermath of the collapse British Rail originally intended to repair and re-open the tunnel, but this was ruled out as being excessively dangerous and difficult once investigations revealed the extent of the collapse. It was judged that it would be more expedient and cost-effective to construct a new alignment for the railway that bypassed the tunnel.

This decision resulted in a total of around 1 kilometre (1,100 yd) of existing railway being abandoned and replaced by a new section of line constructed in an open cutting, approximately 40 m (130 ft) to the west of the tunnel. This required a similar westward realignment of the A1 trunk road. The contractor Sir Robert McAlpine & Sons Ltd started work on the new railway alignment on 7 May 1979, and it was completed on 20 August. The portals of the collapsed tunnel were sealed to prevent further access, and the approach cuttings were filled.

During the closure, some trains from King's Cross terminated at Berwick, with onward services being provided by buses, some towing trailers for luggage. The bus service went as far as Dunbar, where a railway shuttle took over between Dunbar and Edinburgh. Other InterCity services reached Edinburgh by diverting from the East Coast Main Line at Newcastle and travelling via Carlisle and Carstairs.

== Visible remains ==
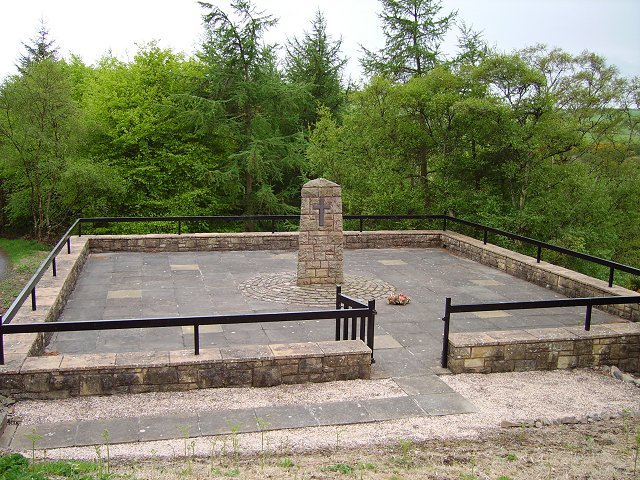
The memorial obelisk above the site of the collapse

Since the tunnel was closed, the landscape has gradually returned to nature. The southern portal has been covered by the hillside, and the only clues to the route of the old line are a dry-stone wall marking the railway boundary, and a disused bridge that used to carry the A1 main road over the line.

=== Memorial ===
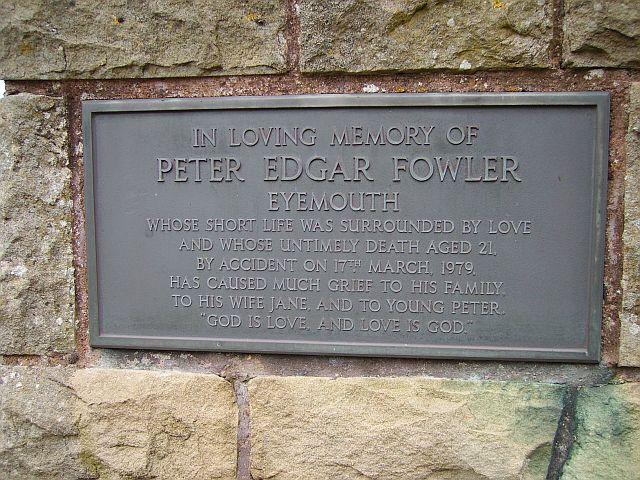
Peter Fowler

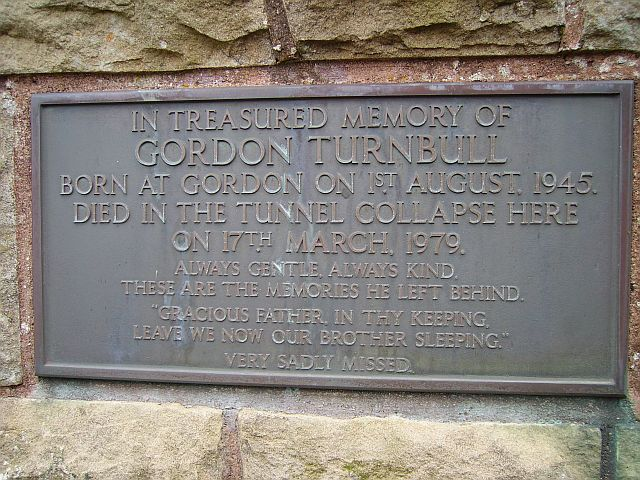
Gordon Turnbull

Memorial plaques

As the collapsed portion of the tunnel was never excavated, the site contains the bodies of both workers who were killed in the collapse: Gordon Turnbull (aged 33) from Gordon, 22 miles (35 km) away, and Peter Fowler (aged 21) from Eyemouth. A three-sided obelisk was erected over the point where the tunnel collapsed as a memorial. One face of the obelisk displays a cross, while each of the other two faces commemorates one of the men killed.

The memorial is adjacent to a road running over the hill and is marked on 1:50,000 and 1:25,000 scale OS maps, at grid reference NT 797670.

== See also ==
- List of places in Scotland
- List of places in the Scottish Borders
- Railway accidents in Scotland
