= Drumerdannan =

Townland in County Cavan, Ireland

Drumerdannan (Irish derived place name, either Droim Eadar Dhá n-Abhainn meaning 'The Hill-Ridge between the Two Rivers’ or Droim ar Daingean meaning 'The Hill-Ridge of the Fort’.) is a townland in the civil parish of Kildallan, barony of Tullyhunco, County Cavan, Ireland.

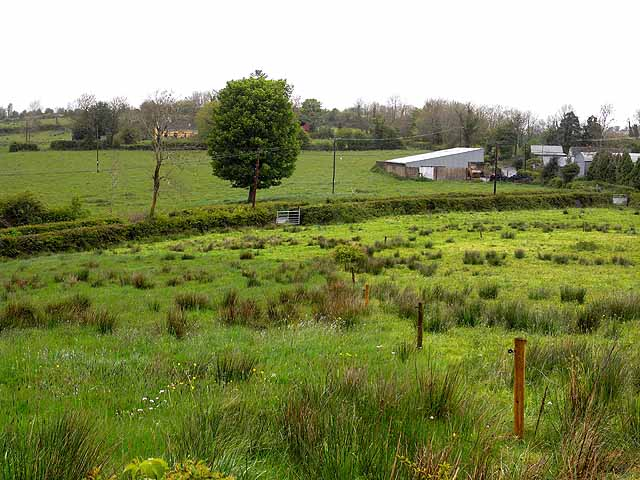
Fields at Drumerdannan - geograph.org.uk - 1303526

== Geography ==
Drumerdannan is bounded on the north by Gortnacleigh townland, on the west by Clooneen and Drumcase townlands, on the east by Deramfield and Deralk townlands and on the south by Snakeel and Eonish townlands. Its chief geographical features are Lough Oughter, Dumb Lough, small streams, a forestry plantation, a gravel pit and spring wells. Drumerdannan is traversed by the R201 road (Ireland), the local L1508 road, minor public roads and rural lanes. The townland covers 142 acres, including 2 acres of water.

== Etymology ==
The 1609 Plantation of Ulster Map depicts the townland as Dromerdana. A government grant of 1610 spells the name as Dromardavan. A 1629 Inquisition spells the name Dromerdavan otherwise called Dromerdennan. The 1652 Commonwealth Survey spells the name as Dromerdanyn.

== History ==
From medieval times up to the early 1600s, the land belonged to the McKiernan Clan.

In the Plantation of Ulster King James VI and I by grant dated 23 July 1610 granted the Manor of Clonyn or Taghleagh, which included one poll of Dromardavan, to Sir Alexander Hamilton of Innerwick, Scotland. On 29 July 1611 Arthur Chichester, 1st Baron Chichester and others reported that - Sir Alexander Hamilton, Knt, 2,000 acres in the county of Cavan; has not appeared: his son Claud took possession, and brought three servants and six artificers; is in hand with building a mill; trees felled; raised stones and hath competitent arms in readiness. Besides there are arrived upon that portion since our return to Dublin from the journey, as we are informed, twelve tenants and artificers who intend to reside there and build upon the same. An Inquisition held at Cavan on 10 June 1629 stated that the poll of Dromerdavan otherwise called Dromerdennan contained four sub-divisions named Curlaghtamoine, Achinicart, Achingrona and Turrie.

The 1652 Commonwealth Survey states the owner was Sir Francis Hamilton.

In the Hearth Money Rolls compiled on 29 September 1663 there were two Hearth Tax payers in Dromerdanen alias Dronerdanan- Tirlagh Brady and James Brady.

The 1790 Cavan Carvaghs list spells the townland name as Dromordanan.

The 1825 Tithe Applotment Books list nine tithepayers in the townland.

The Drumerdannan Valuation Office books are available for April 1838.

Griffith's Valuation of 1857 lists thirteen landholders in the townland.

The landlord of most of Drumerdannan in the 19th century was Hugh Wallace.

== Census ==
| Year | Population | Males | Females | Total Houses | Uninhabited |
|---|---|---|---|---|---|
| 1841 | 60 | 34 | 26 | 10 | 0 |
| 1851 | 56 | 30 | 26 | 10 | 0 |
| 1861 | 37 | 23 | 14 | 7 | 0 |
| 1871 | 26 | 13 | 13 | 8 | 2 |
| 1881 | 30 | 14 | 16 | 7 | 1 |
| 1891 | 43 | 22 | 21 | 7 | 0 |

In the 1901 census of Ireland, there were six families listed in the townland.

In the 1911 census of Ireland, there were six families listed in the townland.

== Antiquities ==
1. An earthen enclosure. Described in the ‘Archaeological Survey of County Cavan’ (Site No. 1334) as- Not marked on OS 1836 or 1876 editions. Situated on the summit of a low drumlin hill. Although the site was levelled in the early 1950s, the outline of the perimeter may still be traced.
2. Two foot-bridges over the streams.
