= Glasstown =

Townland in County Cavan, Ireland

Glasstown (Irish or English derived place name, Glas meaning 'Green' in Irish or Glaise meaning 'A Stream', Town is an Anglicisation of the Irish 'Tún', meaning "Bottom-lands" (i.e. the lowest level of the land), so the probable meaning is either "The Green Bottom-Lands" or 'The Bottom-Lands along the Stream', or possibly a 'Glass Factory' according to local tradition, but unlikely.) is a townland in the civil parish of Kildallan, barony of Tullyhunco, County Cavan, Ireland. It is also called Port (Irish derived place name, Port meaning 'The Landing-Place’).

== Geography ==
Glasstown is bounded on the east by Cloncose, Drumcase and Drumkerril townlands and on the west by Feugh (Bishops) and Gorteen (Gorteenagarry) townlands. Its chief geographical features are small streams and spring wells. Glasstown is traversed by the local L5503 road, minor public roads and rural lanes. The townland covers 119 acres.

== History ==
From medieval times up to the early 1600s, the land belonged to the McKiernan Clan.

In the Plantation of Ulster King James VI and I by grant dated 23 July 1610 granted the Manor of Clonyn or Taghleagh, which included this townland, to Sir Alexander Hamilton of Innerwick, Scotland. On 29 July 1611 Arthur Chichester, 1st Baron Chichester and others reported that - Sir Alexander Hamilton, Knt, 2,000 acres in the county of Cavan; has not appeared: his son Claud took possession, and brought three servants and six artificers; is in hand with building a mill; trees felled; raised stones and hath competitent arms in readiness. Besides there are arrived upon that portion since our return to Dublin from the journey, as we are informed, twelve tenants and artificers who intend to reside there and build upon the same.

The 1790 Cavan Carvaghs list spells the townland name as Port.

Ambrose Leet's 1814 Directory spells the name as Glass-town.

In 1818-19 a Sunday school was kept in the townland, funded by the Hibernian Sunday School Society. It had 78 scholars.

The 1825 Tithe Applotment Books list seven tithepayers in the townland.

The Glasstown Valuation Office books are available for April 1838.

Griffith's Valuation of 1857 lists seventeen landholders in the townland.

The landlord of most of Glasstown in the 19th century was Hugh Wallace.

A description of Glasstown in 1937 is in the Dúchas folklore collection.

== Census ==
Year	Population	Males	Females	Total Houses	Uninhabited
1841	71	30	41	9	0
1851	37	18	19	7	0
1861	30	16	14	9	1
1871	42	22	20	8	0
1881	48	23	25	9	0
1891	46	24	22	9	1

In the 1901 census of Ireland, there were nine families listed in the townland.

In the 1911 census of Ireland, there were eight families listed in the townland.

== Antiquities ==
1. In the early 19th century there was a hedge-school in Glasstown. The Commissioners of Irish Education Inquiry in 1826 stated that the teacher was Terence McAvena, a Roman Catholic, who was paid £9 per annum. The school was a building of stone and lime. In 1826 there were 46 pupils, 34 boys and 12 girls, of whom 32 were Roman Catholics and 15 were Church of Ireland.
