= Gorteen (Gorteenagarry) =

Townland in County Cavan, Ireland

Gorteen (Irish derived place name, Goirtín meaning 'The Little Field'.) is a townland in the civil parish of Kildallan, barony of Tullyhunco, County Cavan, Ireland. It is also called Gorteenagarry (Irish derived place name, Goirtín an Gharraí meaning 'The Little Field of the Garden').

== Geography ==
Gorteen is bounded on the north by Feugh (Bishops) and Glasstown townlands, on the west by Drumbo (Tullyhunco) and Drummully East townlands, on the south by Snakeel townland and on the east by Clooneen and Drumcase townlands. Its chief geographical features are small streams, spring wells and a forestry plantation. Gorteen is traversed by the local L5503 road, minor public roads and rural lanes. The townland covers 153 acres.

== Etymology ==
The 1609 Plantation of Ulster Map depicts the townland as Gortinagary. A government grant of 1610 spells the name as Gortinagery. A 1629 Inquisition spells the name as Gortinagary and Gartenegarrie. The 1652 Commonwealth Survey spells the name as Gurteenagary.

== History ==
From medieval times up to the early 1600s, the land belonged to the McKiernan Clan.

In the Plantation of Ulster King James VI and I by grant dated 23 July 1610 granted the Manor of Clonyn or Taghleagh, which included one poll of Gortinagery, to Sir Alexander Hamilton of Innerwick, Scotland. On 29 July 1611 Arthur Chichester, 1st Baron Chichester and others reported that - Sir Alexander Hamilton, Knt, 2,000 acres in the county of Cavan; has not appeared: his son Claud took possession, and brought three servants and six artificers; is in hand with building a mill; trees felled; raised stones and hath competitent arms in readiness. Besides there are arrived upon that portion since our return to Dublin from the journey, as we are informed, twelve tenants and artificers who intend to reside there and build upon the same. An Inquisition held at Cavan on 10 June 1629 stated that the poll of Gortinagary contained three sub-divisions named Gortinreaghe, Atibrian and Knockilivaine.

The 1652 Commonwealth Survey states the owner was Sir Francis Hamilton.

In the Hearth Money Rolls compiled on 29 September 1663 there were two Hearth Tax payers in Gortinnary- Ternan McKernan and Owen Relly.

The 1790 Cavan Carvaghs list spells the townland name as Gortnagarely.

Ambrose Leet's 1814 Directory spells the name as Gorteen.

The 1825 Tithe Applotment Books list thirteen tithepayers in the townland.

In the 1825 Registry of Freeholders for County Cavan there was one freeholder registered in Gortenegorick- Edward Murphy. He was a Forty-shilling freeholders holding a lease for lives from his landlord, Mr. Southwell.

The Gorteen Valuation Office books are available for April 1838.

Griffith's Valuation of 1857 lists twenty-three landholders in the townland.

The landlord of most of Gorteen in the 19th century was Hugh Wallace.

The 1937 Duchas collection mentions folklore on Gorteen.

== Census ==
Year	Population	Males	Females	Total Houses	Uninhabited
1841	115	62	53	17	0
1851	97	50	47	18	0
1861	78	37	41	16	1
1871	66	32	34	15	0
1881	60	26	34	13	1
1891	50	20	30	10	1

In the 1901 census of Ireland, there were eleven families listed in the townland.

In the 1911 census of Ireland, there were nine families listed in the townland.

== Antiquities ==
1. A 19th century hedge-school. In 1845 the headmaster of Gortnagarry (School No. 4348), was paid £8 per annum. There were 145 pupils of which 86 were boys and 59 girls. In 1851 there were 180 pupils, of which 93 were boys and 87 were girls.
