= Drumcase =

Townland in County Cavan, Ireland

- Townland
- Location in Ireland
- Coordinates: 54°02′24″N 7°30′35″W
- Country: Ireland
- County: County Cavan
- Parish: Kildallan

Drumcase (Irish derived place name, Droim Catha meaning 'The Hill-Ridge of the Battle'.) is a townland in the civil parish of Kildallan, barony of Tullyhunco, County Cavan, Ireland. It is also called Drumrath (Irish derived place name, Droim Ráth meaning 'The Hill-Ridge of the Fort’).

== Geography ==
Drumcase is bounded on the north by Cloncose, Glasstown and Gortnacleigh townlands, on the east by Drumerdannan townland, on the west by Gorteen (Gorteenagarry) townland and on the south by Clooneen townland. Its chief geographical features are Drumcase Hill which reaches a height of 302 feet, small streams and spring wells. Drumcase is traversed by minor public roads and rural lanes. The townland covers 84 acres.

== Etymology ==
The 1609 Plantation of Ulster Map depicts the townland as Dromcagh. A government grant of 1610 spells the name as Dromragh. A 1629 Inquisition spells the name as Dromrath otherwise called Dromcha, Drumcache and Dromcache. The 1652 Commonwealth Survey spells the name as Dromkah.

== History ==
From medieval times up to the early 1600s, the land belonged to the McKiernan Clan.

In the Plantation of Ulster King James VI and I by grant dated 23 July 1610 granted the Manor of Clonyn or Taghleagh, which included one poll of Dromragh, to Sir Alexander Hamilton of Innerwick, Scotland. On 29 July 1611 Arthur Chichester, 1st Baron Chichester and others reported that - Sir Alexander Hamilton, Knt, 2,000 acres in the county of Cavan; has not appeared: his son Claud took possession, and brought three servants and six artificers; is in hand with building a mill; trees felled; raised stones and hath competitent arms in readiness. Besides there are arrived upon that portion since our return to Dublin from the journey, as we are informed, twelve tenants and artificers who intend to reside there and build upon the same. An Inquisition held at Cavan on 10 June 1629 stated that the poll of Dromrath otherwise called Dromcha contained five sub-divisions named Curardinpourt, Knockbeache, Coullan, Tawnahinfin and Largan. It also describes the boundaries of Drumcase as- Drumcache bounding upon the to Knocknehorna parcell of Feache, on the northwest, and from thence southward to a holl in the woode called Leagyveaghe, Englished the 'wheyholle', and from thence all southward to Drombo, all boundinge with the Feache upon the west, being termont lande, meered with a drye meere all thorow the wood betwixt the said Drumcache and Feache.

The 1652 Commonwealth Survey states the owner was Sir Francis Hamilton and describes it as wasteland.

The 1790 Cavan Carvaghs list spells the townland name as Drumcase.

The 1825 Tithe Applotment Books list four tithepayers in the townland.

The Drumcase Valuation Office books are available for April 1838.

Griffith's Valuation of 1857 lists four landholders in the townland.

The landlord of Drumcase in the 19th century was Hugh Wallace.

== Census ==
Year	Population	Males	Females	Total Houses	Uninhabited
1841	33	14	19	5	1
1851	18	10	8	4	1
1861	17	11	6	3	0
1871	18	9	9	3	0
1881	13	6	7	4	1
1891	14	6	8	3	0

In the 1901 census of Ireland, there were five families listed in the townland.

In the 1911 census of Ireland, there were two families listed in the townland.

== Antiquities ==
1. A foot-bridge across a stream.
