= Cloncose =

Townland in County Cavan, Ireland

Cloncose (Irish derived place name, Cluain Cuas meaning 'The Meadow of the Hollows'). is a townland in the civil parish of Kildallan, barony of Tullyhunco, County Cavan, Ireland. It has a sub-division called Crockanroe (Irish derived place name, Cnocan Rua meaning 'The Small Red Hill') on the northern end.

== Geography ==
Cloncose is bounded on the west by Drumkerril and Glasstown townlands, on the south by Drumcase townland and on the east by Gortnacleigh and Tonyarraher townlands. Its chief geographical features are small streams and spring wells. Cloncose is traversed by minor public roads and rural lanes. The townland covers 86 acres.

== History ==
From medieval times up to the early 1600s, the land belonged to the McKiernan Clan.

The 1609 Plantation of Ulster Map depicts the townland as Cloncose. A government grant of 1610 spells the name as Cloncose. A 1629 Inquisition spells the name as Cloncose and Cloncuiss. The 1652 Commonwealth Survey spells it as Clooncuose.

In the Plantation of Ulster King James VI and I by grant dated 23 July 1610 granted the Manor of Clonyn or Taghleagh, which included one poll of Cloncose, to Sir Alexander Hamilton of Innerwick, Scotland. On 29 July 1611 Arthur Chichester, 1st Baron Chichester and others reported that- Sir Alexander Hamilton, Knt, 2,000 acres in the county of Cavan; has not appeared: his son Claud took possession, and brought three servants and six artificers; is in hand with building a mill; trees felled; raised stones and hath competitent arms in readiness. Besides there are arrived upon that portion since our return to Dublin from the journey, as we are informed, twelve tenants and artificers who intend to reside there and build upon the same. An Inquisition held at Cavan on 10 June 1629 stated that the poll of Cloncose contained four sub-divisions named Gortnekillefohin, Knockanvisfuit, Gartinnecassaghe and Moneshein. It also described the boundary of the townland as- bounding upon Drumnoass on the north, meared thorow a greate boge to Ballina and Garticloyche, and from thence meered by a running brooke or streame to Knocknehorna.

The 1652 Commonwealth Survey states the landowner was Sir Francis Hamilton and it was described as wasteland.

The 1790 Cavan Carvaghs list spells the townland name as Clonoose.

The 1825 Tithe Applotment Books list five tithepayers in the townland.

The Cloncose Valuation Office books are available for April 1838.

Griffith's Valuation of 1857 lists five landholders in the townland.

The landlord of Cloncose in the 19th century was Hugh Wallace.

== Census ==
Year	Population	Males	Females	Total Houses	Uninhabited
1841	38	22	16	6	0
1851	24	14	10	5	0
1861	17	10	7	5	0
1871	23	12	11	5	0
1881	17	7	10	5	0
1891	17	7	10	4	0

In the 1901 census of Ireland, there are eight families listed in the townland.

In the 1911 census of Ireland, there are three families listed in the townland.

== Antiquities ==
1. An earthen fort. The Archaeological Survey of County Cavan states- No. 336. Cloncose Fort. Rath. Raised circular area (internal diameter 38.4 metres) enclosed by two substantial earthen banks with outer fosses. The external fosse has been modified and incorporated into the field drainage system. Corresponding breaks in banks with accompanying causeway at north-east represents original entrance.
2. A souterrain in the above fort. The Archaeological Survey of County Cavan states- No. 1227. Souterrain at Cloncose Rath. The entrance to the rath is at north-east. Running west from this to the centre of the internal area is a long, shallow depression (length 28.3 metres, width 2.4 metres, diameter 0.3 metres) which may represent the remains of a collapsed souterrain..
