= Clooneen =

Townland in County Cavan, Ireland

Clooneen (Irish derived place name, Cluainín meaning 'The Little Meadow'.) is a townland in the civil parish of Kildallan, barony of Tullyhunco, County Cavan, Ireland.

== Geography ==
Clooneen is bounded on the north by Drumcase townland, on the west by Gorteen (Gorteenagarry) townland, on the south by Snakeel townland and on the east by Drumerdannan and Gortnacleigh townlands. Its chief geographical features are Dumb Lough, Clooneen Hill, small streams and spring wells. Clooneen is traversed by minor public roads and rural lanes. The townland covers 157 acres.

== History ==
From medieval times up to the early 1600s, the land belonged to the McKiernan Clan.

The 1609 Plantation of Ulster Map depicts the townland as Cloinine. A government grant of 1610 spells the name as Clonine alias Tagleagh. A 1629 Inquisition spells the name as Clonyn alias Taghleagh and Clonein alias Taghleagh. The 1652 Commonwealth Survey spells it as Clooneene.

In the Plantation of Ulster King James VI and I by grant dated 23 July 1610 granted the Manor of Clonyn or Taghleagh, which included one poll of Clonine alias Tagleagh (after which the Manor was named), to Sir Alexander Hamilton of Innerwick, Scotland. On 29 July 1611 Arthur Chichester, 1st Baron Chichester and others reported that- Sir Alexander Hamilton, Knt, 2,000 acres in the county of Cavan; has not appeared: his son Claud took possession, and brought three servants and six artificers; is in hand with building a mill; trees felled; raised stones and hath competitent arms in readiness. Besides there are arrived upon that portion since our return to Dublin from the journey, as we are informed, twelve tenants and artificers who intend to reside there and build upon the same. An Inquisition held at Cavan on 10 June 1629 stated that the poll of Clonyn alias Taghleagh contained four sub-divisions named Tachamoir, Clonemeighragh, Tivilagh and Tivinagour. It also described the boundary of the townland as- bounding upon Snakeill on the south Dromerdavan meered thorowe a boige or runninge stream to the maine logh, and from the logh norwards boundinge upon Dirriachwill, upon the east meered thorowe a mosse in some parte, and in some parte by a drye mere till it bounde to Dirrachlie, and there meered thorow a greate boige.

The 1652 Commonwealth Survey states the landowner was Sir Francis Hamilton and it was described as wasteland.

In the Hearth Money Rolls compiled on 29 September 1663 there were two Hearth Tax payers in Clonyn- Teige McKernan and Owen McCaffry.

The 1790 Cavan Carvaghs list spells the townland name as Cloonine.

The 1825 Tithe Applotment Books list seven tithepayers in the townland.

The Clooneen Valuation Office books are available for April 1838.

Griffith's Valuation of 1857 lists ten landholders in the townland.

The landlord of Clooneen in the 19th century was Hugh Wallace.

== Census ==
Year	Population	Males	Females	Total Houses	Uninhabited
1841	60	41	19	10	0
1851	67	33	34	10	0
1861	52	26	26	10	0
1871	44	24	20	10	0
1881	30	11	19	9	0
1891	28	14	14	7	1

In the 1901 census of Ireland, there are seven families listed in the townland.

In the 1911 census of Ireland, there are six families listed in the townland.
