= Grantshouse railway station =

Disused railway station in Grantshouse, Berwickshire

Grantshouse
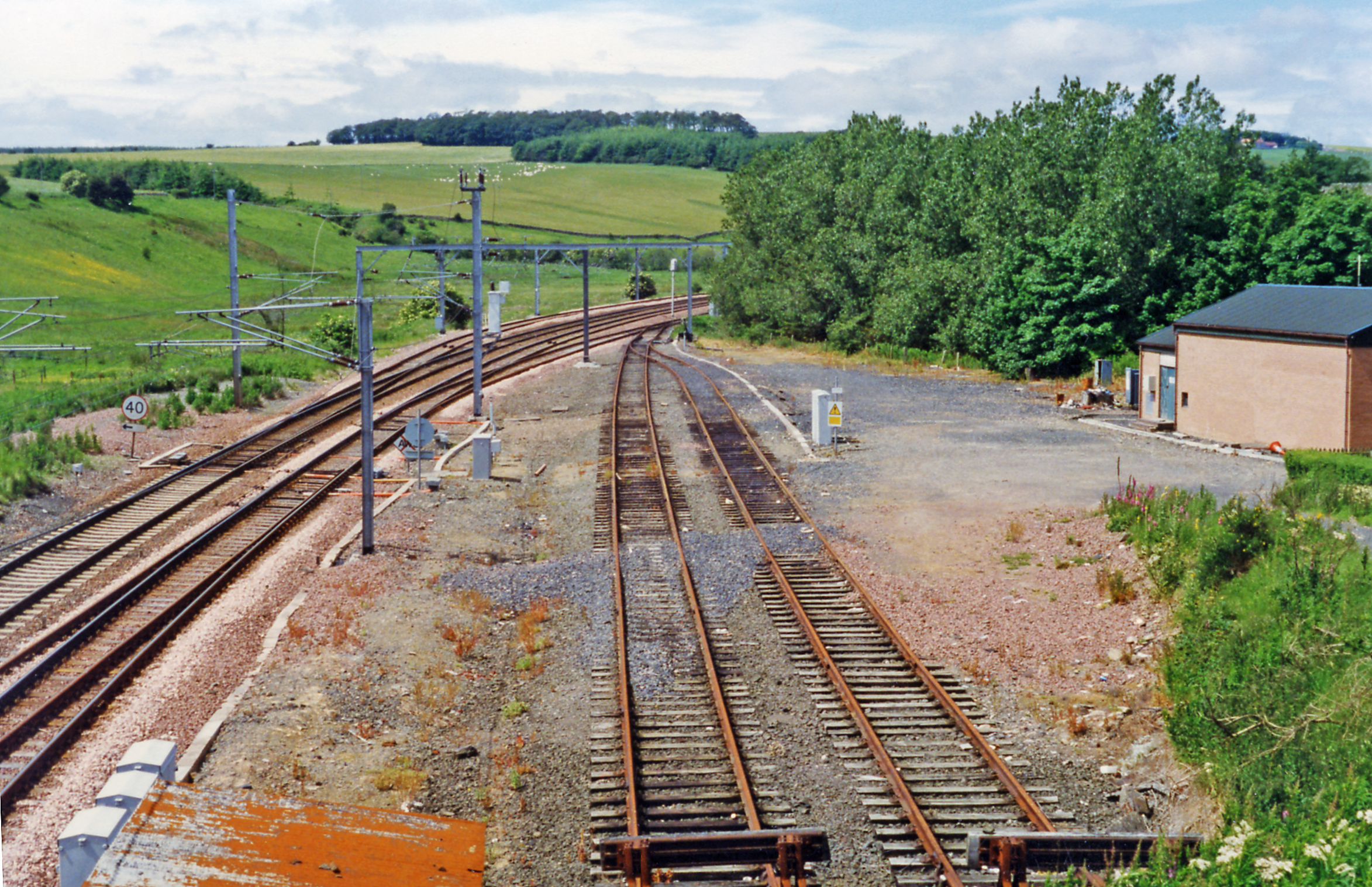
- The site of the station, looking west, in 1997

General information
- Location: Grantshouse, Berwickshire; Scotland
- Coordinates: 55.8824°N 2.307°W
- Grid reference: NT808655
- Platforms: 2

Other information
- Status: Disused

History
- Original company: North British Railway
- Pre-grouping: North British Railway
- Post-grouping: LNER

Key dates
- 22 June 1846: Opened as Grant's House
- 1915: Name changed to Grantshouse
- 4 May 1964: Closed to passengers
- 28 December 1964: Closed to goods
Location

Grantshouse railway station served the village of Grantshouse, Berwickshire, Scotland from 1846 to 1964 on the East Coast Main Line.

== History ==
The station was opened as Grant's House on 22 June 1846 by the North British Railway. The goods yard was to the west and had a goods shed. The station's name was changed to Grantshouse in 1915. The signal box opened in 1918. The station closed to passengers on 4 May 1964 and closed to goods on 28 December 1964.

Preceding station	Historical railways	Following station
Reston; Line open, station open (resited)	North British Railway; East Coast Main Line	Cockburnspath; Line open, station closed
