= Berwick-upon-Tweed railway station =

Railway station in Northumberland, England

Berwick-upon-Tweed
- Main station building

General information
- Location: Berwick-upon-Tweed, Northumberland, England
- Coordinates: 55°46′28″N 2°00′38″W
- Grid reference: NT994534
- Owner: Network Rail
- Manager: London North Eastern Railway
- Platforms: 2

Other information
- Station code: BWK
- Classification: DfT category C1

History
- Original company: North British Railway; York, Newcastle and Berwick Railway
- Pre-grouping: North British Railway; North Eastern Railway
- Post-grouping: London and North Eastern Railway; British Rail (North Eastern Region)

Key dates
- 22 June 1846: Opened as Berwick
- 1 January 1955: Renamed Berwick-upon-Tweed

Passengers
- 2020/21: ▼0.142 million
- Interchange: ▼783
- 2021/22: ▲0.590 million
- Interchange: ▲1,065
- 2022/23: ▼0.568 million
- Interchange: ▲6,581
- 2023/24: ▲0.630 million
- Interchange: ▲12,423
- 2024/25: ▲0.707 million
- Interchange: ▲14,439
Location
- Location within Northumberland
Notes
- Passenger statistics from the Office of Rail and Road

Berwick-upon-Tweed is a railway station on the East Coast Main Line, which runs between London King's Cross and Edinburgh Waverley. The station, situated 67 miles (108 km) north-west of Newcastle, serves the border town of Berwick-upon-Tweed, in Northumberland, England. It is owned by Network Rail and managed by London North Eastern Railway.

It is the most northerly railway station in England, being less than 3 miles (4.8 km) from the border with Scotland. The station, with its long single island platform, lies immediately to the north of the Royal Border Bridge.

== History ==
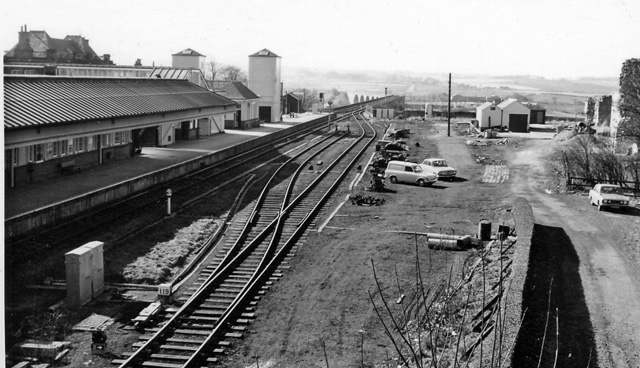
The station, as seen in 1970

In 1847, the Great Hall of Berwick Castle had to be demolished to make way for the new station, (Note: The former West Wall of the castle still marks the boundary of the former station goods yard.) which opened the following year. This replaced an initial structure erected by the North British Railway, whose line from the north first reached the town in 1846. The Newcastle and Berwick Railway meanwhile reached the southern bank of the river Tweed in March 1847, but it was another eighteen months before a temporary viaduct across the river was commissioned to allow through running between Edinburgh and Newcastle. This, in turn, was replaced by the current Royal Border Bridge in July 1850. The station was rebuilt by the London and North Eastern Railway in 1927 and the buildings are Grade-II listed.

The station was also, at one time, served by local stopping trains between Newcastle and Edinburgh, and the branch line from Newtown St Boswells, via Kelso; this joined the main line at Tweedmouth, on the other side of the river, between 1851 until closure in 1964.

For approximately five months in 1979, this was the terminus for services from London King's Cross, after the East Coast Main Line was blocked by the collapse of Penmanshiel Tunnel. Buses linked this station with Dunbar, from where a railway shuttle service continued to Edinburgh Waverley.

The central platform and the footbridge

== Facilities ==
The station has a car park, with 124 spaces, and has bicycle storage facilities. It is staffed throughout the week during working hours; several self-service ticket machines are available for purchases and for collecting pre-paid tickets. Other facilities on offer on the concourse include a waiting room, Costa coffee shop, vending machine, payphone and toilets, whilst there is a first class lounge on the platform; the two are linked by a fully accessible footbridge with lifts. Train running information is offered via digital CIS displays, audible announcements and timetable posters.

== Services ==
A Class 802 for TransPennine Express calls at Berwick-upon-Tweed

The station is served by three train operating companies, which provide the following off-peak services in trains per hour/day (tph/tpd):

London North Eastern Railway:

- 1 tp2h to London King's Cross, via Newcastle, Darlington, York, Doncaster, Newark Northgate and Peterborough
- 1 tp2h to Edinburgh Waverley; of which:
  - 3 tpd extend to Aberdeen, via Dundee
  - 1 tpd extends to Inverness, via Stirling, Perth and Aviemore.

CrossCountry:

- 1 tph to Plymouth, via Newcastle, Leeds, Birmingham New Street and Bristol Temple Meads; of which:
  - 1 tpd extends to Penzance
- 1 tph to Edinburgh Waverley; of which:
  - 2 tpd extend to Glasgow Central, via Motherwell
  - 1 tpd extends to Aberdeen, via Dundee.

TransPennine Express:

- 1 tp2h to Edinburgh Waverley, calling at Reston, Dunbar and East Linton
- 1 tp2h to Newcastle, calling at Alnmouth and Morpeth.

Preceding station	National Rail	Following station
Alnmouth or Newcastle	CrossCountry	Dunbar or Edinburgh Waverley
Alnmouth or Newcastle	London North Eastern Railway; East Coast Main Line	Reston or Dunbar or Edinburgh Waverley
Alnmouth	TransPennine Express; North TransPennine	Reston
	Historical railways	
Terminus	North British Railway; North British Railway Main Line	Burnmouth; Line open; station closed
Tweedmouth; Line open; station closed	North Eastern Railway; York, Newcastle and Berwick Railway	Terminus
