= East Fortune railway station =

Disused railway station in East Fortune, East Lothian

East Fortune
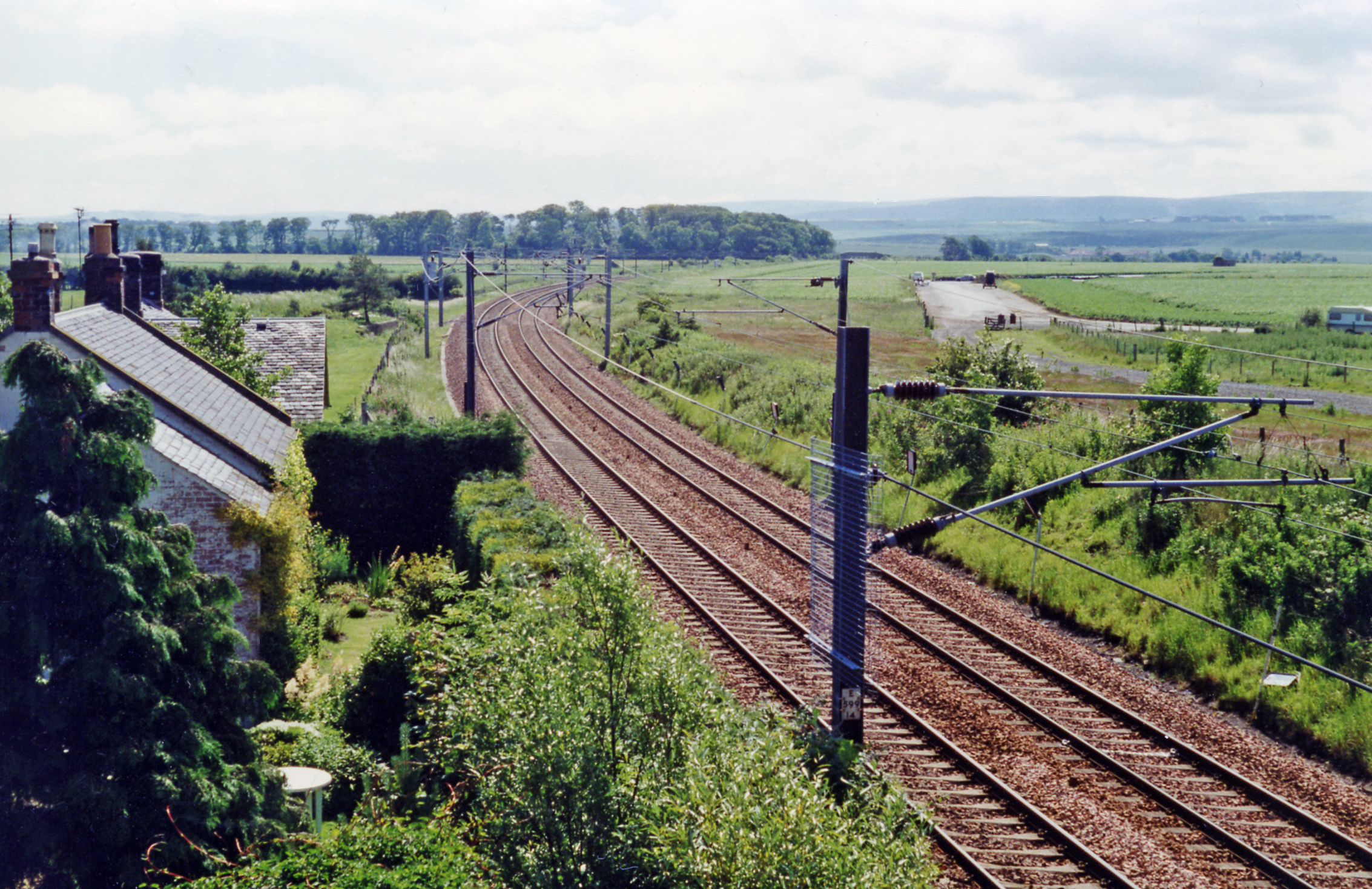
- The site of the station, looking southeast towards Berwick-upon-Tweed, in 1997

General information
- Location: East Fortune, East Lothian; Scotland
- Coordinates: 56.0069°N 2.7096°W
- Grid reference: NT558795
- Platforms: 2

Other information
- Status: Disused

History
- Original company: North British Railway
- Pre-grouping: North British Railway

Key dates
- July 1848: Opened
- 4 May 1964: Closed to passengers
- 14 September 1970: Closed to goods
Location

East Fortune railway station served the village of East Fortune, East Lothian, Scotland from 1848 to 1970 on the North British Railway Main Line.

== History ==
The station was opened in July 1848 by the North British Railway. It was situated immediately east of the later East Fortune Hospital and on the northeast perimeter of the 20th century airfield.

The station closed to passengers on 4 May 1964 and closed to goods on 14 September 1970.

Preceding station	Historical railways	Following station
Drem	North British Railway; North British Railway Main Line	East Linton; Line & station open (resited)
