= East Fortune =

Coordinates: 56.006°N 2.722°W

- Location within Scotland
- OS grid reference: NT546792
- Civil parish: Athelstaneford
- Council area: East Lothian Council
- Lieutenancy area: East Lothian
- Country: Scotland
- Sovereign state: United Kingdom
- Post town: NORTH BERWICK
- Postcode district: EH39
- Dialling code: 01620
- Police: Scotland
- Fire: Scottish
- Ambulance: Scottish
- UK Parliament: East Lothian
- Scottish Parliament: East Lothian

East Fortune is a village in East Lothian, Scotland, located 2 miles (3 km) north west of East Linton. The area is known for its airfield which was constructed in 1915 to help protect Britain from attack by German Zeppelin airships during the First World War.

The name may mean "settlement where hogs are farmed", from Old English fōr, a hog, and tūn, a settlement. In 1922 several buildings and an area of land were used to create East Fortune Hospital. This served as a tuberculosis sanatorium for the south east region of Scotland until the onset of World War II, when the airfield was brought back into service as RAF East Fortune, and the hospital patients were transferred to Bangour Hospital in West Lothian. The hospital re-opened after the war, but by 1956, as the number of tuberculosis patients began to fall, the hospital changed its function to house the mentally handicapped. In 1997, the hospital closed down, and its patients were transferred to Roodlands Hospital in Haddington.

At the eastern side of the airfield the old runways and link roads of East Fortune airfield are now used as a motorcycle race track run by the Melville Motorcycle Club. There are around seven race weekends every year with racing on both Saturdays and Sundays, continually attracting over 200 competitors over the several classes available. Riders travel from the local area, Northumberland and as far as Ireland on occasions for most weekends. Melville Motorcycle Club run the track on a not-for-profit basis and have reinvested heavily in resurfacing and upgrading facilities. From 2014, the track also hosts a Greenpower race.

== See also ==
East Fortune railway station
