= Dunbar railway station =

Railway station in East Lothian, Scotland

Dunbar Scottish Gaelic: Dùn Bàrr
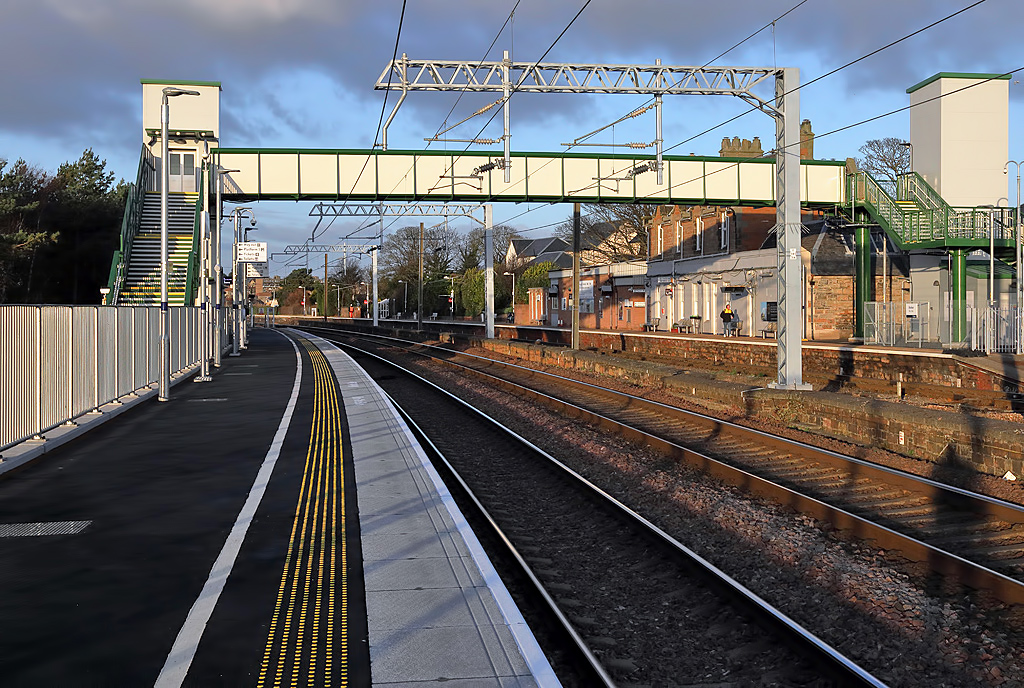
- Looking north from the reinstated second platform (2020)

General information
- Location: Dunbar, East Lothian, Scotland
- Coordinates: 55.9985°N 2.5145°W
- Grid reference: NT680784
- Manager: ScotRail
- Platforms: 2
- Tracks: 3

Other information
- Station code: DUN

History
- Original company: North British Railway
- Pre-grouping: North British Railway
- Post-grouping: London and North Eastern Railway

Key dates
- 16 June 1846: Opened

Passengers
- 2020/21: ▼66,300
- 2021/22: ▲0.252 million
- 2022/23: ▲0.319 million
- 2023/24: ▲0.399 million
- 2024/25: ▲0.416 million
- 2025/26: ▲0.463 million

Listed Building – Category B
- Designated: 11 January 1988
- Reference no.: LB24857
Location
Notes
- Passenger statistics from the Office of Rail and Road

Dunbar railway station serves the town of Dunbar, in East Lothian, Scotland. It is located on the East Coast Main Line (ECML) and is a two platform station. It is 29 miles 5 chains (46.8 km) from Edinburgh Waverley and 364.1 miles (586.0 km) from London King's Cross.

== History ==
The station was first opened by the North British Railway on 22 June 1846.

Between August and November 1948, the line through the station was affected by severe flooding, causing trains to be diverted via Carlisle.

The northbound platform loop line was taken out of use and lifted in the early 1970s, whilst the platform itself and the station roof were both removed during the modernisation and electrification by British Rail of the northern end of the ECML in 1987–88.

For approximately five months in 1979, it was the terminus for a shuttle service to Edinburgh Waverley; it was provided after the ECML was blocked due to the collapse of Penmanshiel Tunnel. Buses linked Dunbar with Berwick-upon-Tweed, from where rail services to London King's Cross resumed.

=== Accidents and incidents ===
On 3 January 1898, an express passenger train collided with a freight train that was being shunted. One person was killed, and 21 were injured.

== Layout ==
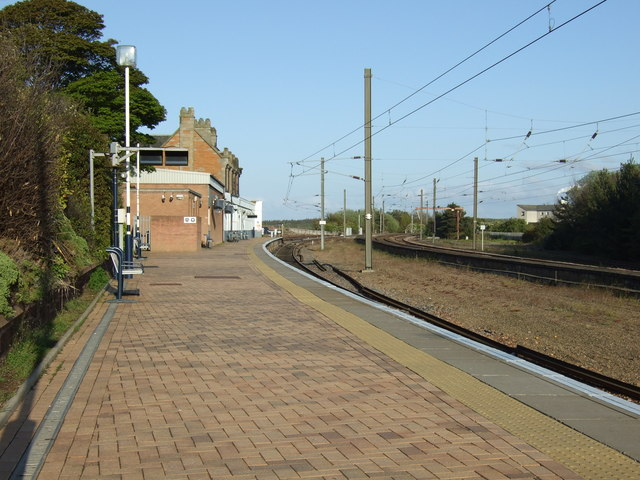
The station seen in 2012, looking south, before the installation of the new platform

Platform one is located on a loop adjacent to the main through lines. The second platform is on the main northbound line. Prior to December 2019, the line on which the main platform is located was bi-directional; this meant that trains travelling to/from London or Edinburgh had to take it in turns to use the station if they were scheduled to stop there. Preliminary work into a new second platform began in October 2015. In December 2018, Network Rail announced that Amco had been appointed the contractors for the construction of the second platform, which would start in summer 2019 and was intended to have the works completed by early 2020.

Construction of the new platform necessitated a new footbridge with lifts; improvements to the station car park were carried out as part of the project. The bridge was completed ahead of schedule and the new platform opened in December 2019. Final fitting work and completion of the car park continued; however, it was delayed due to the COVID-19 pandemic.

== Facilities ==
The station is fully staffed, with the ticket office open throughout the week. Self-service ticket machines are also provided for use outside these times and for collecting pre-paid tickets. There are toilets, a payphone and vending machines on the concourse. Train running information is provided by manual announcements, digital customer information system displays, a help point and timetable posters. Level access is available from the entrance and concourse to the platform.

== Passenger volume ==
Passenger Volume at Dunbar
| | 2002–03 | 2004–05 | 2005–06 | 2006–07 | 2007–08 | 2008–09 | 2009–10 | 2010–11 | 2011–12 | 2012–13 | 2013–14 | 2014–15 | 2015–16 | 2016–17 | 2017–18 | 2018–19 | 2019–20 | 2020–21 | 2021–22 | 2022–23 |
|---|---|---|---|---|---|---|---|---|---|---|---|---|---|---|---|---|---|---|---|---|
| Entries and exits | 224,552 | 266,142 | 288,282 | 299,172 | 332,377 | 339,094 | 318,976 | 333,916 | 362,852 | 374,216 | 400,065 | 425,952 | 452,848 | 449,282 | 460,440 | 477,986 | 473,884 | 66,300 | 252,348 | 319,280 |

The statistics cover twelve month periods that start in April.

== Services ==
The station is served by four train operating companies, which provide the following general off-peak service in trains per hour/day (tph/tpd):

=== CrossCountry ===
- 3 tpd to Edinburgh Waverley
- 2 tpd to Plymouth
- 1 tpd to Birmingham New Street.

=== London North Eastern Railway ===
- 4 tpd to Edinburgh Waverley
- 4 tpd to London Kings Cross
- 1 tpd to York
- 1 tpd to Newcastle.

=== ScotRail ===
- 1 tp2h to Edinburgh Waverley, via Musselburgh (stopping service).

=== TransPennine Express ===
- 1 tp2h to Edinburgh Waverley
- 1 tp2h to Newcastle.

| Preceding station | National Rail | Following station |
|---|---|---|
| Berwick-upon-Tweed | CrossCountry; Cross Country Route | Edinburgh Waverley |
| Alnmouth | CrossCountry; Cross Country Route | Edinburgh Waverley |
| Newcastle | CrossCountry; Cross Country Route | Edinburgh Waverley |
| Reston | London North Eastern Railway; East Coast Main Line | Edinburgh Waverley |
| Berwick-upon-Tweed | London North Eastern Railway; East Coast Main Line | Edinburgh Waverley |
| Alnmouth | London North Eastern Railway; East Coast Main Line | Edinburgh Waverley |
| Reston | TransPennine Express; North Route | East Linton |
| Terminus | ScotRail; Edinburgh–Dunbar | East Linton |
| | Historical railways | |
| Innerwick; Line open, station closed | North British Railway; NBR Main Line | East Linton; Line and station open (resited) |

== Bibliography ==
- Brailsford, Martyn, ed. (December 2017) [1987]. Railway Track Diagrams 1: Scotland & Isle of Man (6th ed.). Frome: Trackmaps. ISBN 978-0-9549866-9-8.
- Quick, Michael (2023). Railway Passenger Stations in Great Britain: A Chronology (PDF) (5th ed.). London: Railway and Canal Historical Society.
