= Cockburnspath railway station =

Disused railway station in Cockburnspath, Berwickshire

Cockburnspath
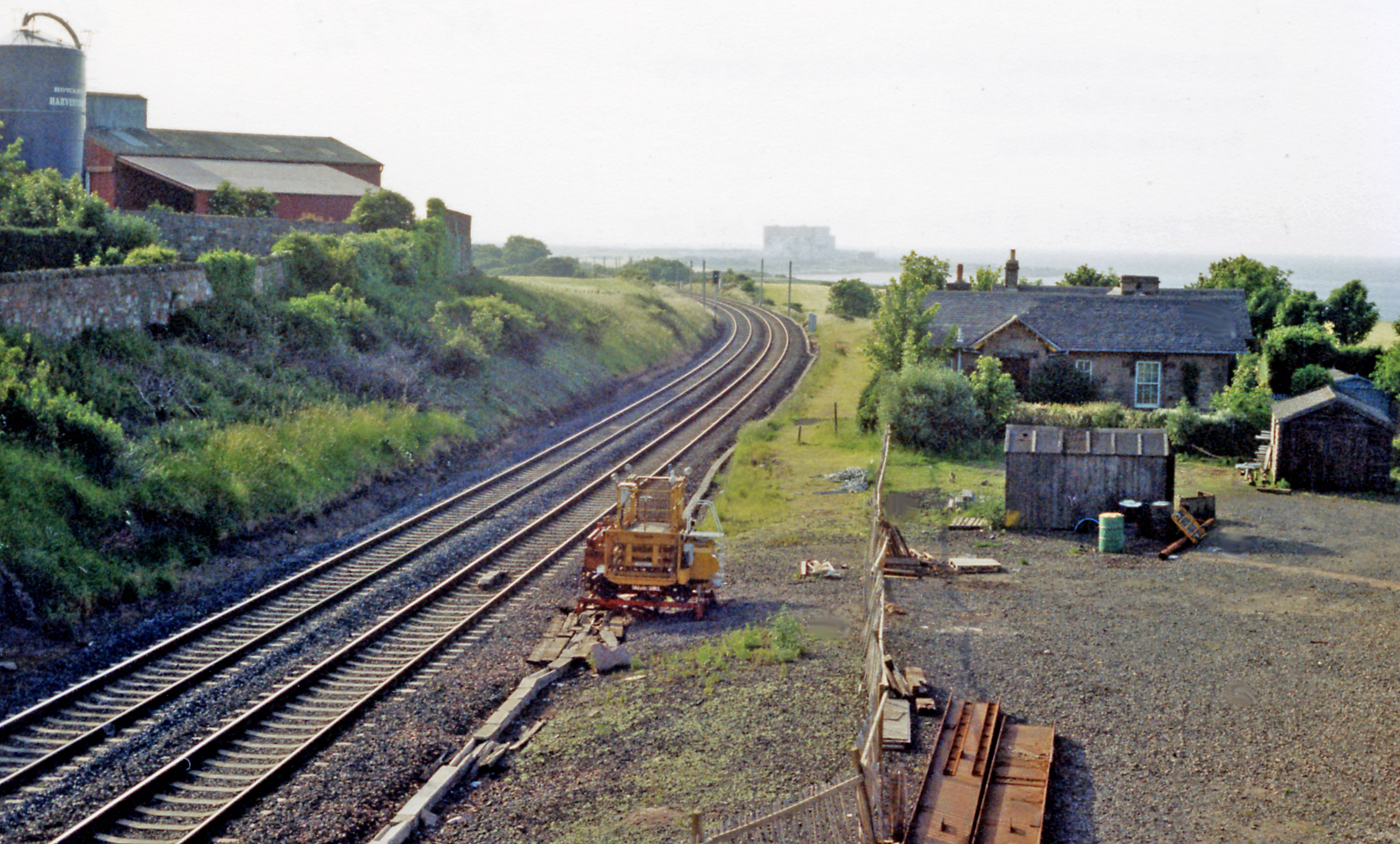
- The site of the station, looking north towards Edinburgh, in 1988

General information
- Location: Cockburnspath, Berwickshire; Scotland
- Coordinates: 55.9377°N 2.3606°W
- Grid reference: NT775716
- Platforms: 2

Other information
- Status: Disused

History
- Original company: North British Railway
- Pre-grouping: North British Railway
- Post-grouping: LNER

Key dates
- 22 June 1846: Opened
- 18 June 1951: Closed
Location

Cockburnspath railway station served the village of Cockburnspath, Berwickshire, Scotland from 1846 to 1951 on the East Coast Main Line.

== History ==
The station opened on 22 June 1846 by the North British Railway. The station building was one-storey and was on a H plan. The station closed on 18 June 1951.

Preceding station	Historical railways	Following station
Grantshouse; Line open, station closed	North British Railway; East Coast Main Line	Innerwick; Line open, station closed
