= Innerwick railway station =

Disused railway station in Innerwick, East Lothian

Innerwick
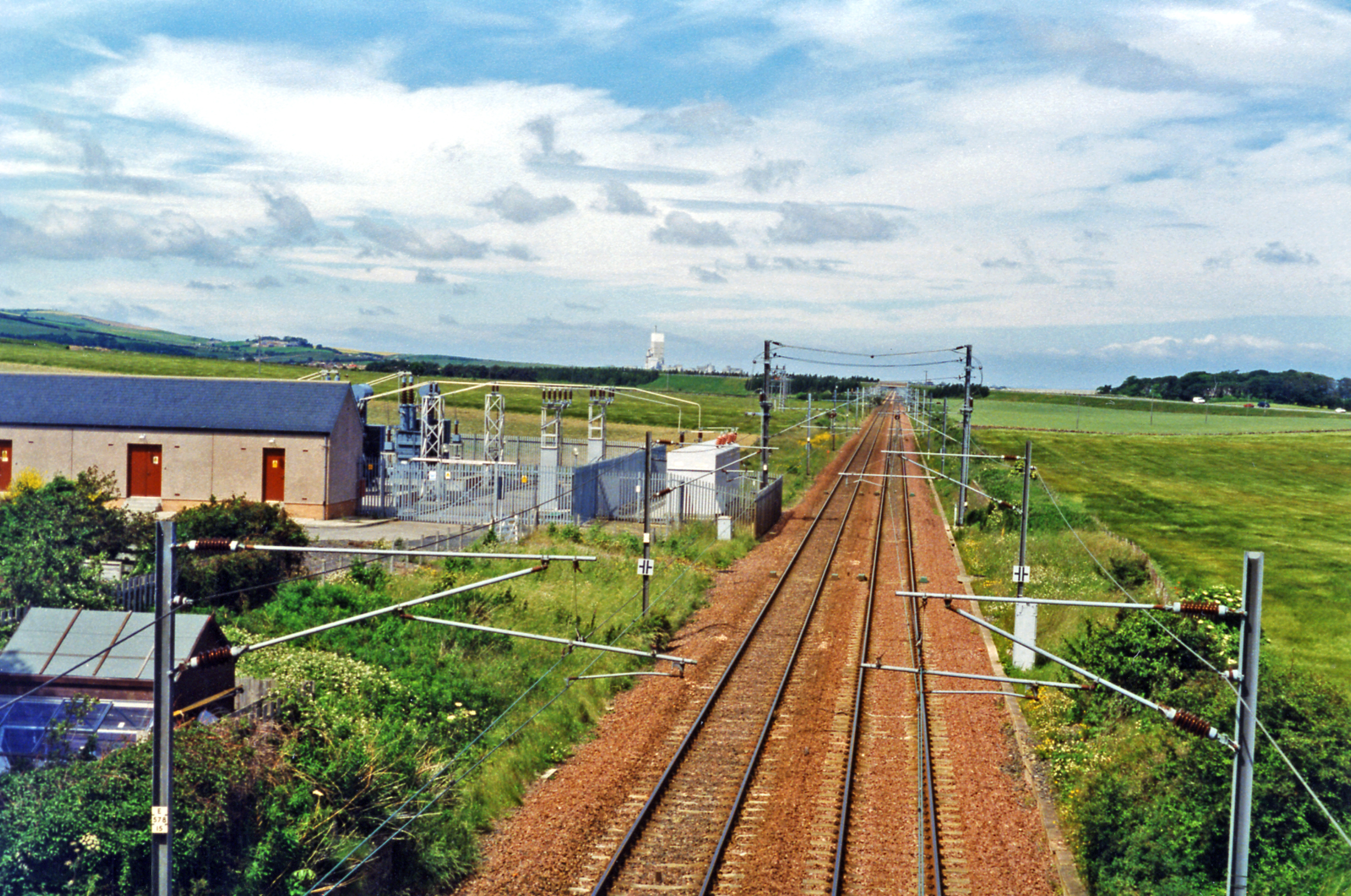
- The site of the station, looking northwest towards Dunbar, in 1997

General information
- Location: Innerwick, East Lothian; Scotland
- Coordinates: 55.9613°N 2.4159°W
- Grid reference: NT741743
- Platforms: 2

Other information
- Status: Disused

History
- Original company: North British Railway
- Pre-grouping: North British Railway
- Post-grouping: LNER

Key dates
- July 1848: Opened
- 18 June 1951: Closed to passengers
- 10 August 1964: Closed to goods

Innerwick railway station served the village of Innerwick, East Lothian, Scotland from 1848 to 1964 on the East Coast Main Line.

== History ==
The station opened in July 1848 by the North British Railway. It closed to passengers on 18 June 1951 and closed to goods traffic on 10 August 1964. The line is still open and the former site is now a large field with a cabbage patch and a line house.

Preceding station	Historical railways	Following station
Cockburnspath; Line open, station closed	North British Railway; East Coast Main Line	Dunbar; Line and station open
