= Gortnacleigh =

Townland in County Cavan, Ireland

Gortnacleigh (Irish derived place name, either Gort na Cléithe meaning 'The Field of the Palisade’ or Gort na Cloiche meaning 'The Field of the Stone'.) is a townland in the civil parish of Kildallan, barony of Tullyhunco, County Cavan, Ireland.

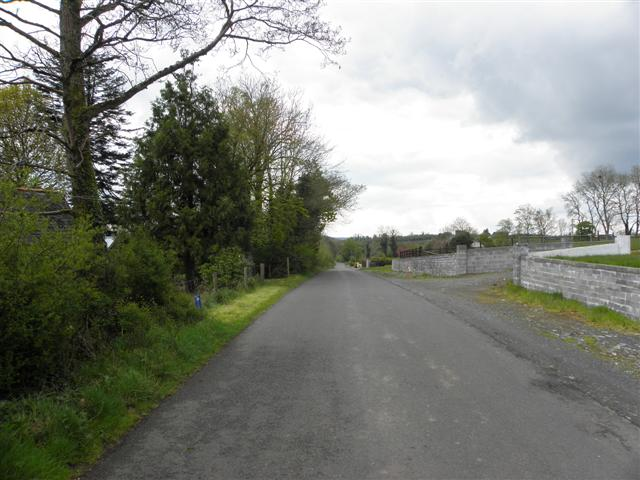
Road at Gortnacleigh (geograph 2915470)

== Geography ==
Gortnacleigh is bounded on the north by Tonyarraher townland, on the west by Cloncose and Drumcase townlands, on the south by Clooneen and Drumerdannan townlands and on the east by Deralk and Moher townlands. Its chief geographical features are small streams and spring wells. Gortnacleigh is traversed by the R201 road (Ireland), minor public roads and rural lanes. The townland covers 99 acres.

== History ==
Until the 1650s, Gortnacleigh formed part of the modern townland of Cloncose and its history is the same up till then. From medieval times up to the early 1600s, the land belonged to the McKiernan Clan.

A 1629 Inquisition spells the name as Garticloyche. The 1652 Commonwealth Survey spells it as Gartnecleighh.

An Inquisition held at Cavan on 10 June 1629 stated that the poll of Cloncose, belonging to Sir Alexander Hamilton, contained four sub-divisions named Gortnekillefohin, Knockanvisfuit, Gartinnecassaghe and Moneshein. It also described the boundary of the townland as- bounding upon Drumnoass on the north, meared thorow a greate boge to Ballina and Garticloyche, and from thence meered by a running brooke or streame to Knocknehorna.

The 1652 Commonwealth Survey states the landowner was Sir Francis Hamilton.

The 1790 Cavan Carvaghs list spells the townland name as Gortnecliff.

The 1825 Tithe Applotment Books list eight tithepayers in the townland.

The Gortnacleigh Valuation Office books are available for April 1838.

Griffith's Valuation of 1857 lists five landholders in the townland.

The landlord of Gortnacleigh in the 19th century was Hugh Wallace.

== Census ==
Year	Population	Males	Females	Total Houses	Uninhabited
1841	60	31	29	8	0
1851	38	21	17	6	1
1861	35	16	19	5	0
1871	22	9	13	4	0
1881	15	7	8	4	0
1891	18	10	8	4	0

In the 1901 census of Ireland, there were seven families listed in the townland.

In the 1911 census of Ireland, there were seven families listed in the townland.

== Antiquities ==
1. An earthen fort. The Archaeological Survey of County Cavan (Site No. 733) states- Raised circular area (internal diameter. 31.2 metres) enclosed by a substantial earthen bank and a fosse. An earlier report (OPW 1969) recorded slight traces of an external bank at NW, ESE and SE. Break in bank with accompanying causeway at NE probably represents original entrance. The 1937 Dúchas folklore collection states- The Gortnacleigh Treasure. There is a treasure supposed to be hidden in Gortnacleigh Fort on the land of James Baxter under a great big stone. There were attempts made to get it, and it is said some of it was found by Patrick Baxter, Gortnacleigh. The treasure consisted of gold. It is said the treasure seemed to be gold that was rolled up in a bar. There is supposed to be a light guarding it at night. Other stories say that a fairy silver shoe was found beside it by John Donoho, Killeshandra.
2. Two foot-bridges over the streams.
3. Gortnacleigh 19th century hedge-school.
