= Reston railway station =

Railway station in the Scottish Borders council area

Reston
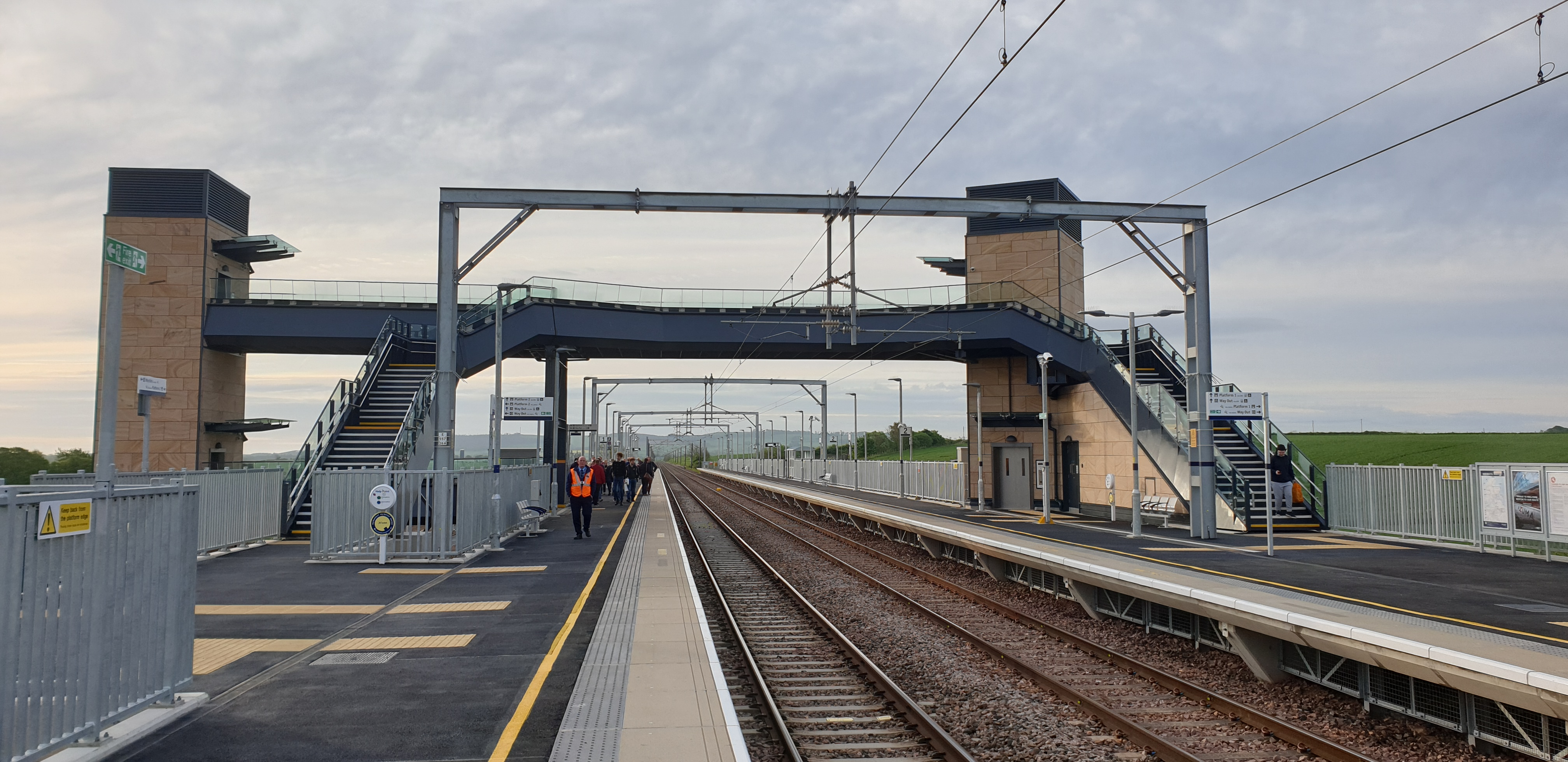
- The current (second) station in May 2022.

General information
- Location: Reston, Scottish Borders; Scotland
- Coordinates: 55.8506°N 2.1972°W
- Grid reference: NT877619
- Owner: Network Rail
- Manager: ScotRail
- Platforms: 2 (originally 3)

Other information
- Station code: RSN

History
- Original company: North British Railway
- Pre-grouping: North British Railway
- Post-grouping: London and North Eastern Railway; British Rail (Scottish Region)

Key dates
- 22 June 1846: Station opened
- 13 August 1849: Duns branch opened
- 10 September 1951: Duns branch closed
- 4 May 1964: Station closed
- 23 May 2022: Resited station opened

Passengers
- 2022/23: 13,190
- 2023/24: ▲21,130
- 2024/25: ▲29,896
- 2025/26: ▲33,486
Location
Notes
- Passenger statistics from the Office of Rail and Road

Reston is a railway station in the small village of Reston that serves the wider rural parish of Coldingham and the nearby town of Eyemouth in the eastern Scottish Borders council area. The station is a minor stop on the East Coast Main Line and opened on 23 May 2022 after a £20 million investment. The station is owned by Network Rail and managed by ScotRail, although the latter company does not provide any services to or from the station. It is the second railway station to have been located in the village, having replaced an earlier station that closed in 1964.

== History ==
=== Original station ===
The main line of the North British Railway, between Edinburgh (North Bridge) and Berwick-upon-Tweed, was authorised either on 4 July 1844 or on 19 July 1844, and opened to the public on 22 June 1846. One of the original stations was Reston, which was flanked by Grantshouse towards Edinburgh and Ayton towards Berwick. The initial service was of five trains each way on weekdays, and two on Sundays.

The station became a junction with the opening of the branch to Duns on 13 August 1849; this line was later extended by the Berwickshire Railway, reaching Earlston on 16 November 1863 and St. Boswells on 2 October 1865. The main line ran roughly east–west through Reston, but turned to the south-east in the eastbound direction. The line to Duns and St. Boswells began at a junction facing Berwick-upon-Tweed and ran southwards towards the first station at Chirnside.

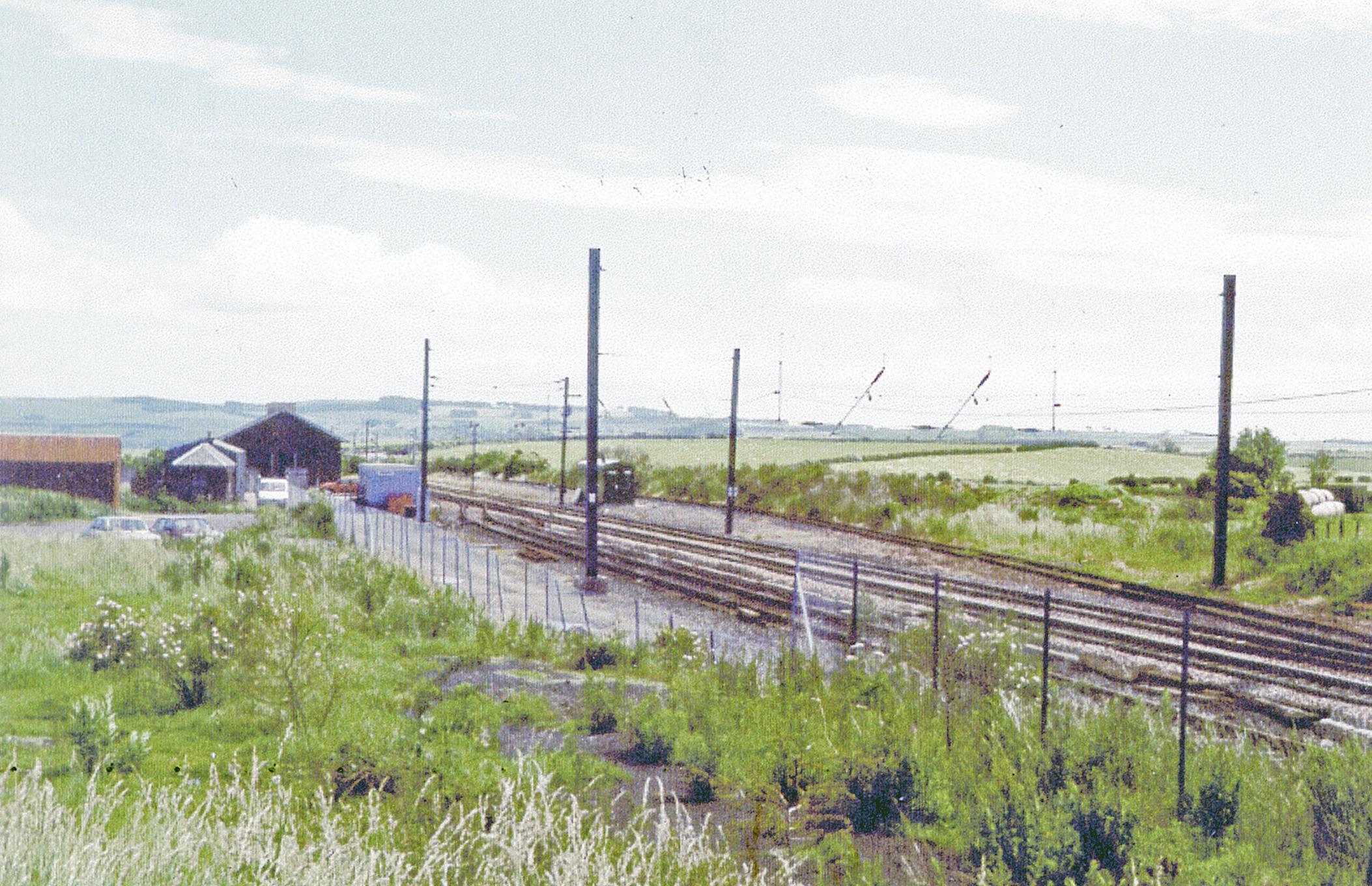
The site of the first Reston station, photographed in 1997. The later site of the current station is obscured by the building in the background.

In 1904 the station (then listed as Reston for Coldingham and St. Abbs) was able to handle all classes of traffic (goods, passengers, parcels, wheeled vehicles, livestock, etc.) and there was a goods crane capable of lifting 1.5 long tons (1,524 kg). Between Reston and Chirnside (on the Duns line) there were sidings known as Auchencrow Siding (just south of the road overbridge at grid reference NT860599) and Billiemains Sidings (just north of the road underbridge at NT858593), each on the western side of the line and able to handle goods only.

Maps of the period show that Reston station had platforms on both sides of the double-track main line which were linked by a footbridge; the station building was on the northern (eastbound) platform; the platform for the single-track Duns line was on the north side of that line; the goods yard with its crane was on the north side of the main line on the western side of the station; and that the junction was to the east of the station. The maps also show sidings close to the junction, a weighing machine in the goods yard, a turntable in the angle between the two routes, a signal box near the junction and several signals.

=== Decline and closure ===
The St. Boswells line was cut back to Duns following flood damage on 12 August 1948. The Duns branch closed to passengers on 10 September 1951, and to freight on 16 July 1965. Reston and Grantshouse stations were listed for closure in the first Beeching report, and duly closed on 4 May 1964; Ayton had closed on 5 February 1962.

The remaining infrastructure at Reston consists of two engineer's sidings, one on each side, and two crossovers 47 miles 14 chains (75.9 km) from Edinburgh Waverley.

=== Reopening ===
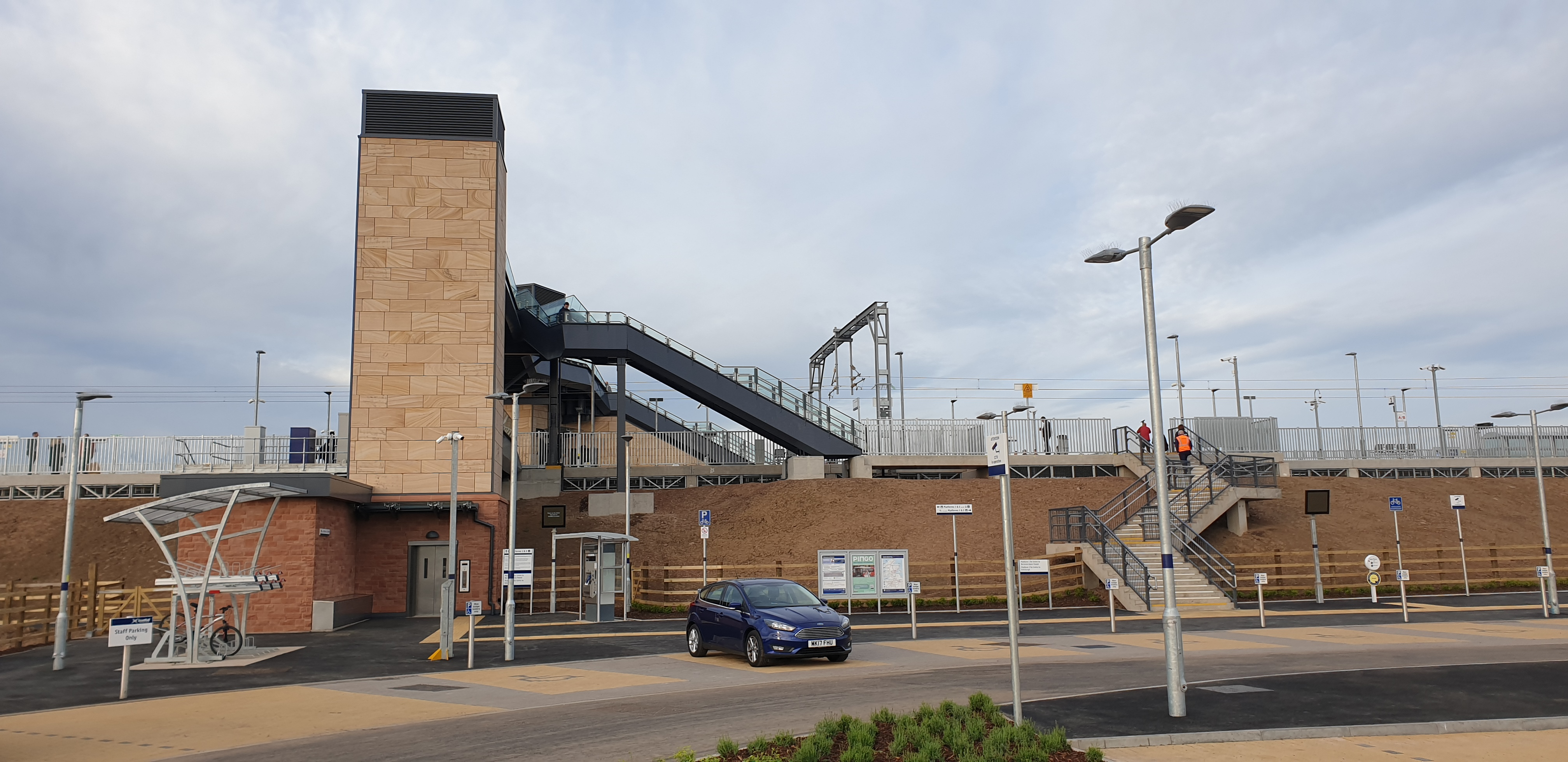
The exterior of the current station in May 2022

Proposals to reopen the station received the backing of John Lamont MSP, who took the case to the Scottish Parliament. A study published in 2013 proposed that East Linton and Reston stations be reopened.

In 2019, Transport Scotland confirmed that the station would be operational by 2024. The outline plans for the new station included 260-metre (853 ft) platforms either side of the Berwick-to-Edinburgh line, long enough to accommodate a 10-carriage train, as well as an accessible footbridge, shelters and a 70-space car park with provision for expansion in the future. The planning application for the new station was submitted in December 2020 and approved in February 2021.

Construction of the £20 million station began in March 2021 and involved the closure of the line during a weekend in September 2021 to enable the station footbridge to be installed.

The station opened on 23 May 2022 with TransPennine Express and London North Eastern Railway providing the first southbound and northbound services respectively.

== Services ==
Reston is managed by ScotRail, but as of 2026 the company provides no services to the station; all train services are run by TransPennine Express and LNER. There is an approximately two hourly service seven days a week northbound to Edinburgh and southbound to Newcastle operated by TransPennine Express. LNER runs one train per day in the Morning to Edinburgh and a late evening southbound run to Doncaster (York on Saturdays and Newcastle on Sundays).

Preceding station	National Rail	Following station
Berwick-upon-Tweed	TransPennine Express East Coast Main Line	Dunbar or Edinburgh Waverley
Berwick-upon-Tweed	London North Eastern Railway: East Coast Main Line; Limited Service	Dunbar or Edinburgh Waverley
	Historical railways	
Ayton Line open; station closed	North British Railway NBR Main Line	Grantshouse Line open; station closed
	Disused railways	
Terminus	North British Railway Berwickshire Railway	Chirnside Line and station closed

== Bibliography ==
- Awdry, Christopher (1990). Encyclopaedia of British Railway Companies. London: Guild Publishing. CN 8983.
- Beeching, Richard (27 March 1963). The Reshaping of British Railways, part 1: Report (Report). London: Her Majesty's Stationery Office.
- Butt, R. V. J. (October 1995). The Directory of Railway Stations: details every public and private passenger station, halt, platform and stopping place, past and present (1st ed.). Sparkford: Patrick Stephens Ltd. ISBN 978-1-85260-508-7. OCLC 60251199. OL 11956311M.
- Conolly, W. Philip (January 1976). British Railways Pre-Grouping Atlas and Gazetteer (5th ed.). Shepperton: Ian Allan. ISBN 0-7110-0320-3. EX/0176.
- "East coast rail study submitted to transport minister". BBC News. BBC. 11 December 2013.
- Ellis, Cuthbert Hamilton (September 1959) [1955]. The North British Railway (2nd ed.). Shepperton: Ian Allan. 813/284/15 959.
- Yonge, John (December 2007) [1987]. Jacobs, Gerald (ed.). Railway Track Diagrams 1: Scotland & Isle of Man (5th ed.). Bradford on Avon: Trackmaps. ISBN 978-0-9549866-3-6.
- "Reston station case taken to Scottish Parliament". BBC News South Scotland. 21 March 2012.
- "The Berwickshire Railway". Dunse History Society. Archived from the original on 22 March 2012.
- Berwickshire (Map). 1:2500. Ordnance Survey. 1908.
- The Railway Clearing House Handbook of Railway Stations 1904. Newton Abbot: David & Charles. 1970 [1904]. ISBN 0-7153-5120-6.
- "Eastern fury at Abellio's delay for rail timetable". Southern Reporter. Selkirk: Johnston Publishing Ltd. 23 April 2015. Archived from the original on 25 January 2016.
