= Ayton railway station =

Disused railway station in Ayton, Scottish Borders

Coordinates: 55.838°N 2.115°W

Ayton
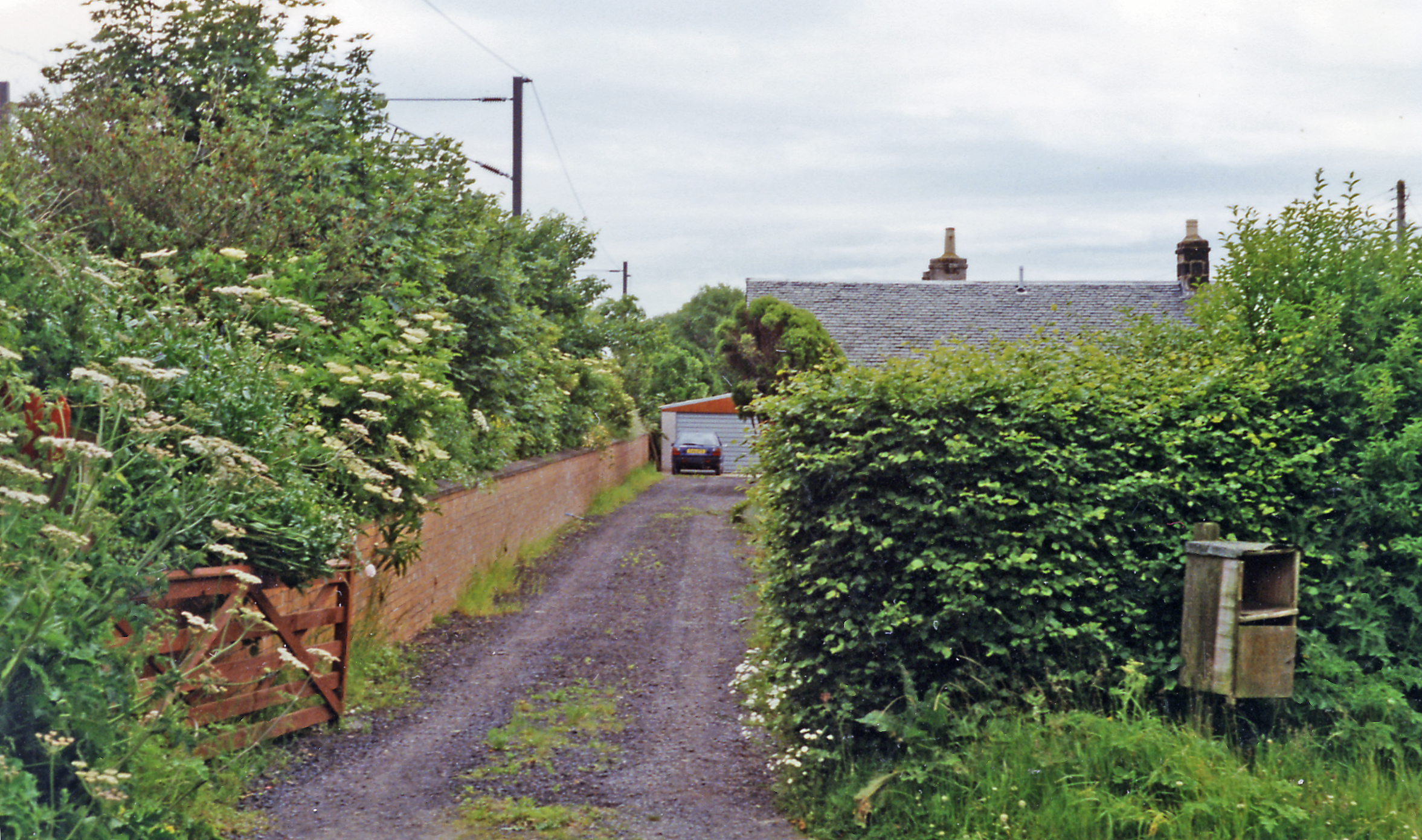
- Ayton station site

General information
- Location: Scottish Borders; Scotland
- Platforms: 2

Other information
- Status: Disused

History
- Original company: North British Railway
- Pre-grouping: North British Railway
- Post-grouping: London and North Eastern Railway

Key dates
- 22 June 1846: Station opens
- 5 February 1962: Station closes
Location

Ayton railway station was a station which served the village of Ayton in the Scottish area of Scottish Borders. It was located on what is now known as the East Coast Main Line. The station was also served by trains on the Berwickshire Railway which diverged from the main line at Reston.

== History ==
Opened by the North British Railway, it became part of the London and North Eastern Railway during the Grouping of 1923. The station then passed on to the Scottish Region of British Railways on nationalisation in 1948.

The station was closed by British Railways in 1962.

Preceding station	Historical railways	Following station
Burnmouth; Line open, station closed	North British Railway; North British Railway Main Line	Reston; Line and station open
