= Reston, Scottish Borders =

Village in Scottish Borders, Scotland

Coordinates: 55.851°N 2.1932°W

Reston
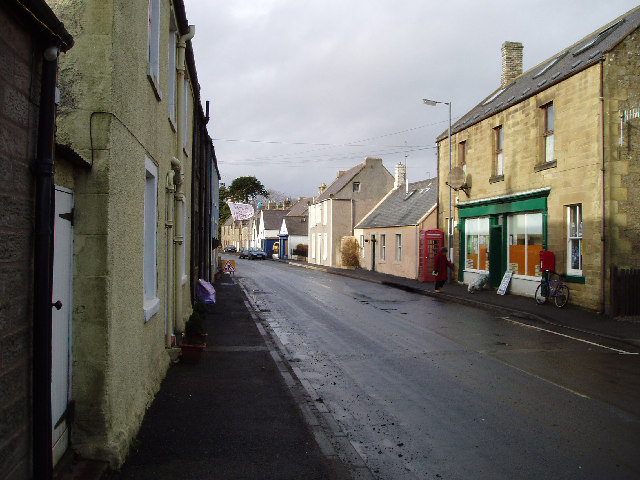
- The main street in Reston.

- Location within the Scottish Borders
- Population: 451
- OS grid reference: NT877621
- Council area: Scottish Borders
- Lieutenancy area: Berwickshire
- Country: Scotland
- Sovereign state: United Kingdom
- Post town: EYEMOUTH
- Postcode district: TD14
- Police: Scotland
- Fire: Scottish
- Ambulance: Scottish
- UK Parliament: Berwickshire, Roxburgh and Selkirk
- Scottish Parliament: Ettrick, Roxburgh and Berwickshire

Reston is a village located in the southeast of Scotland, in Berwickshire, Scottish Borders region. The village lies on the western bank of the Eye Water.

== Location ==
It is located on the East Coast Main Line railway, which runs between London King's Cross and Edinburgh Waverley. Reston was once the location of the railway station and junction between the Berwickshire Railway and the ECML. Both the Berwickshire Railway and Reston station closed in the 1960s. However the reopening of Reston station was approved and construction began in March 2021. A study published in 2013 proposed that East Linton and Reston stations be reopened. Reston station re-opened on 23 May 2022 following completion of a £20m redevelopment.

The A1 (Great North Road) runs to the east of the village.

== Population ==
The current population is about 450.

== See also ==
- List of places in the Scottish Borders
- List of places in East Lothian
- List of places in Midlothian
- List of places in West Lothian
