= East Linton railway station =

Railway station in East Lothian, Scotland

East Linton Scottish Gaelic: Linton an Ear
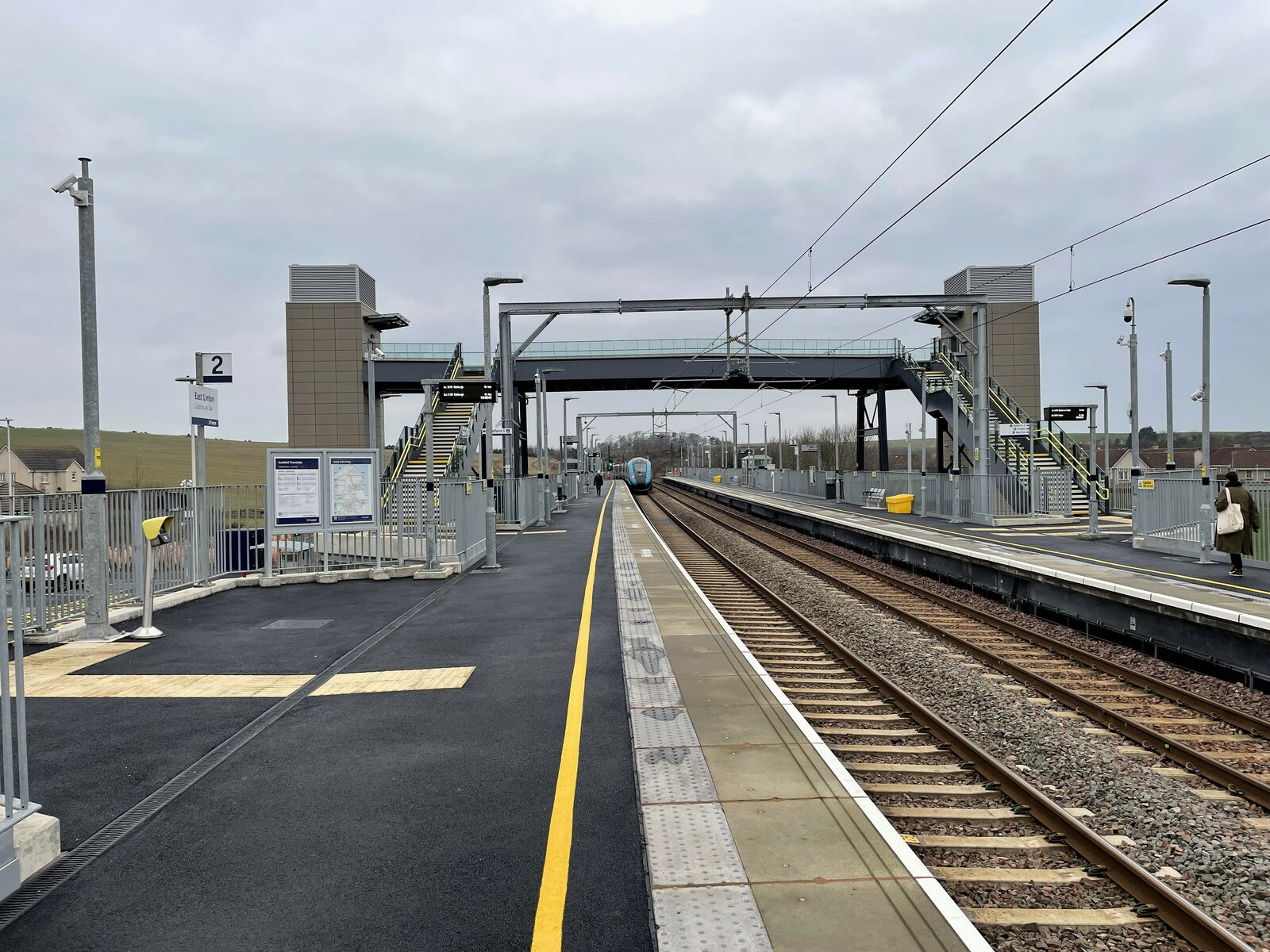
- Station in March 2024

General information
- Location: East Linton, East Lothian, Scotland
- Coordinates: 55.9856°N 2.6579°W
- Grid reference: NT590771
- Operator: ScotRail
- Platforms: 2

Other information
- Station code: ELT

History
- Original company: North British Railway
- Pre-grouping: North British Railway
- Post-grouping: London and North Eastern Railway

Key dates
- 22 June 1846: Opened as Linton
- December 1864: Renamed East Linton
- 4 May 1964: Closed
- 13 December 2023: Reopened and resited

Passengers
- 2023/24: 21,624
- 2024/25: ▲66,982
- 2025/26: ▲120,700
Location

East Linton railway station is a railway station serving the village of East Linton, Scotland. The original station opened in 1846 and closed in 1964. A new station, on a different site, opened on 13 December 2023. It is on the East Coast Main Line, 23 miles 10 chains (37.2 km) from Edinburgh Waverley.

== History ==
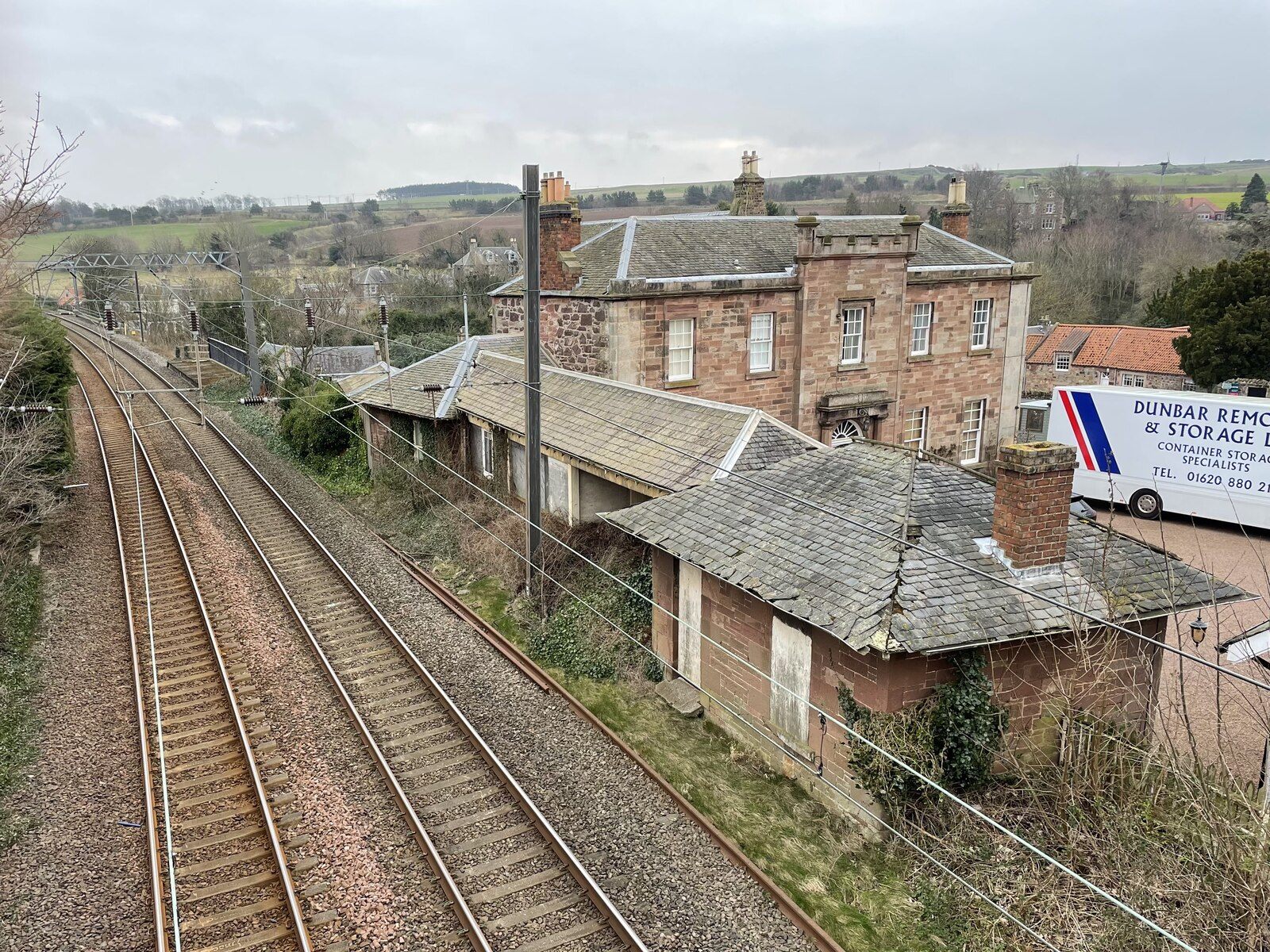
View of the original station building

The main line of the North British Railway, between Edinburgh (North Bridge) and Berwick-upon-Tweed, was authorised either on 4 July 1844 or on 19 July 1844, and Linton station - renamed East Linton in December 1864 - opened to the public on 22 June 1846. The initial service was of five trains each way on weekdays, and two on Sundays.

As of 1904, the station was able to handle all classes of traffic (goods, passengers, parcels, wheeled vehicles, livestock, etc.) and there was a goods crane capable of lifting 3 long tons (3,048 kg).

Maps of the period show that East Linton station had platforms on both sides of the double-track main line which were linked by a footbridge; the station building was on the southern (westbound) platform; the goods yard with its crane was on the south side of the main line on the western side of the station. The maps also show long sidings each side of the line to the west of the station, a goods shed and weighing machine in the goods yard, a signal box opposite the goods shed and several signals.

Unlike Drem and Dunbar, both East Linton and the nearby East Fortune were listed for closure in the first Beeching report, and duly closed on 4 May 1964.

=== New station ===
A study published in 2013 proposed that East Linton and Reston stations be reopened. When Abellio ScotRail took over the franchise in April 2015, they committed to reopening both stations as part of the local Berwick service by December 2016. Although Scottish Government and local authority funding was secured, a decision was taken between Transport Scotland and East Lothian Council to integrate the construction of East Linton railway station within a larger programme of works in the next rail investment period of 2019 to 2024.

Contractors started survey work in early 2020 at the proposed site of the station, which is to the west of the old station site. Plans for the railway station were published in October 2020 and submitted in early 2021, and construction work started in December that year. The first timetabled train services, operated by ScotRail and TransPennine Express, began on 13 December 2023.

== Facilities ==
The station has two 518-foot (158 m) platforms, connected by lifts and a footbridge, and a car park with 114 spaces. There are cycle spaces, electric vehicle charging points, ticket machines and waiting shelters.

== Passenger volume ==
Passenger Volume at East Linton
	2023–24	2024–25
Entries and exits	21,624	66,982

The statistics cover twelve month periods that start in April.

== Services ==
On Monday to Fridays, ScotRail provides five trains per day to Edinburgh and six per day to Dunbar. TransPennine Express also provide five trains per day to Newcastle (one of which extends to Liverpool Lime Street), with a sixth train which operates as far as Berwick-upon-Tweed, and five trains per day to Edinburgh.

On Saturdays, there are four ScotRail and seven TransPennine Express services to Edinburgh. In the other direction, there are five ScotRail services to Dunbar, five TransPennine Express services to Newcastle, and two TransPennine Express services to Berwick-upon-Tweed.

On Sundays, there are four TransPennine Express services to Edinburgh, four to Newcastle, and one to Berwick-upon-Tweed. ScotRail services do not call at East Linton on Sundays.

The frequency on services is uneven, meaning that there are variable gaps between services depending on the time of day.

Preceding station	National Rail	Following station
Dunbar	ScotRail; Edinburgh to Dunbar	Wallyford
Dunbar	TransPennine Express; Edinburgh to Newcastle	Edinburgh Waverley
	Historical railways	
Dunbar; Line and station open	North British Railway; NBR Main Line	East Fortune; Line open, station closed

== Bibliography ==
- Awdry, Christopher (1990). Encyclopaedia of British Railway Companies. Sparkford: Patrick Stephens Ltd. ISBN 1-8526-0049-7. OCLC 19514063. CN 8983.
- Beeching, Richard (27 March 1963). The Reshaping of British Railways, part 1: Report (Report). London: Her Majesty's Stationery Office.
- Butt, R. V. J. (October 1995). The Directory of Railway Stations: details every public and private passenger station, halt, platform and stopping place, past and present (1st ed.). Sparkford: Patrick Stephens Ltd. ISBN 978-1-85260-508-7. OCLC 60251199. OL 11956311M.
- "East coast rail study submitted to transport minister". BBC News. BBC. 11 December 2013.
- Ellis, Cuthbert Hamilton (September 1959) [1955]. The North British Railway (2nd ed.). Shepperton: Ian Allan. 813/284/15 959.
- Jones, Ben (March 2020). "Survey work starts at East Linton". The Railway Magazine. Vol. 166, no. 1, 428. Horncastle: Morton's Media. p. 84. ISSN 0033-8923.
- Haddingtonshire (Map). 1:2500. Ordnance Survey. 1907.
- The Railway Clearing House Handbook of Railway Stations 1904. Newton Abbot: David & Charles. 1970 [1904]. ISBN 0-7153-5120-6.
- Ritchie, Cameron (20 July 2017). "Waiting another seven years for new station?". East Lothian Courier. Newsquest Clyde & Forth.
