= Grantshouse =

Village in Scottish Borders, Scotland

Coordinates: 55.88303°N 2.30538°W

- Location within the Scottish Borders
- Council area: Scottish Borders
- Lieutenancy area: Berwickshire
- Country: Scotland
- Sovereign state: United Kingdom
- Post town: Duns
- Postcode district: TD11
- Police: Scotland
- Fire: Scottish
- Ambulance: Scottish

Grantshouse is a small village in Berwickshire in the Scottish Borders of Scotland. It lies on the A1, and its nearest railway stations are Dunbar to the north and Reston to the south.

== See also ==
- List of places in the Scottish Borders
- List of places in Scotland
