= Innerwick =

Coordinates: 55.957°N 2.451°W

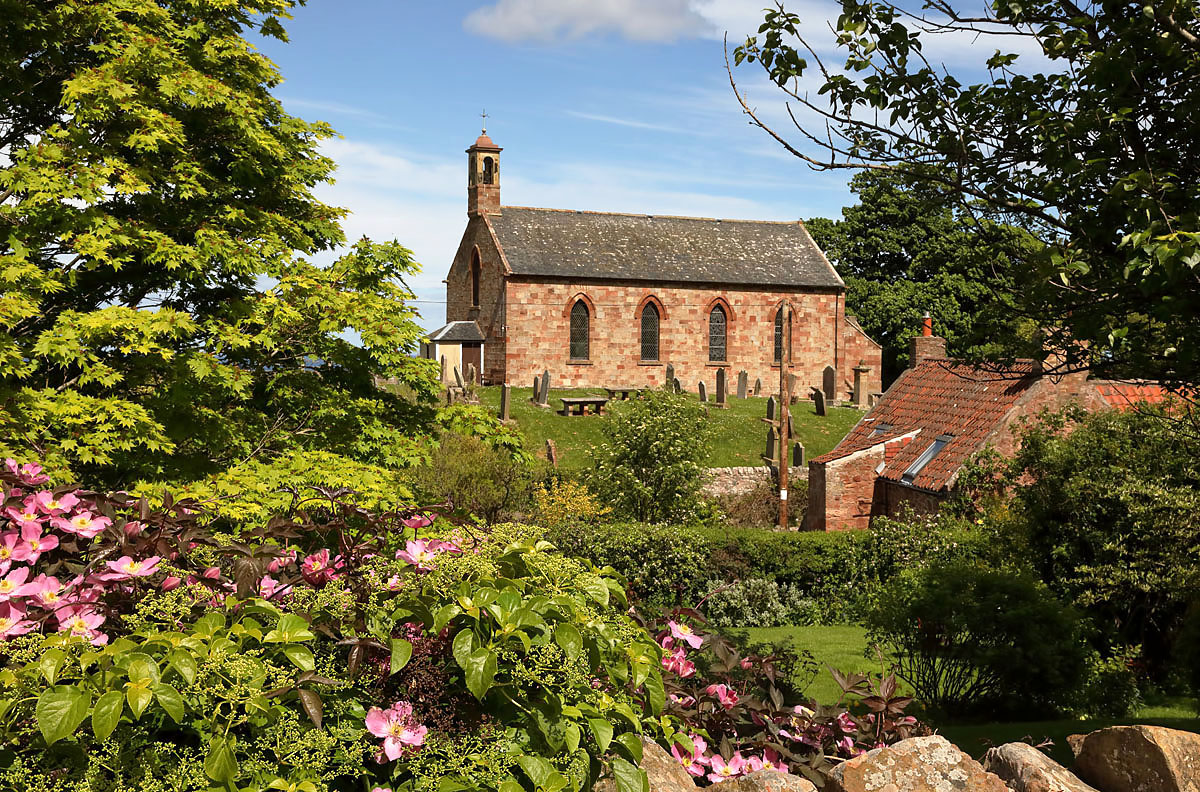

- Location within Scotland
- OS grid reference: NT718738
- Civil parish: Innerwick
- Council area: East Lothian Council
- Lieutenancy area: East Lothian
- Country: Scotland
- Sovereign state: United Kingdom
- Post town: DUNBAR
- Postcode district: EH42
- Dialling code: 01368
- Police: Scotland
- Fire: Scottish
- Ambulance: Scottish
- UK Parliament: East Lothian
- Scottish Parliament: East Lothian

Innerwick is a coastal civil parish and small village in the east of East Lothian, five miles (eight kilometres) from Dunbar and approximately 32 miles (51 kilometres) from Edinburgh.

== Name ==
The name Innerwick is of Anglo-Saxon origin and means inland farm or dwelling place. It was presumably coined around the 7th – 9th centuries.

== Prehistory ==
Excavations to the north of Innerwick, at Dryburn Bridge, in 1978 and 1979 found a multi-period site dating from the Mesolithic to the Iron Age. The site was discovered in 1974 through aerial photography and was excavated as a result of the threat posed by limestone quarrying in the area. The excavation found evidence of Mesolithic and Neolithic occupation in this area. These were next to two cist burials dating to 2300–2000 BC, the Bronze Age. All of which were under a later Iron Age settlement. One of the skeletons from the cists had indications of leprosy, which would have made it the earliest example in Europe, but extensive analysis indicated that it was actually tuberculosis, which in some cases, with long infections, can cause secondary infections that can destroy the nasal bones. Each cist had two human remains, one fully intact and one that appears to have been de-fleshed elsewhere and then buried in the cist (indicated by the mixing of bones the absence of smaller bones, like finger bones). The Iron Age settlement had three phases to it, the first two with a palisade but the last without, with was during the Roman occupation of Southern Scotland.

To the south of Innerwick is Braidwood, a hillfort. Excavations carried out by Robert Stevenson and Kenneth Steer in 1940 and Stevenson again in 1947–1948, the Edinburgh University Archaeological Society in 1951–1953, and by George Watson's Archaeological Society in 1968 have done little to help understand the fort or its date.

== History ==
Innerwick Castle was originally a Stewart stronghold, then passed to a grandson of Walter fitz Gilbert de Hamilton, and remained in the Hamilton family, until its destruction. Alongside nearby Thornton Castle, which belonged to Lord Home, it was destroyed by the invading forces of the Duke of Somerset before the Battle of Pinkie in 1547, during the Rough Wooing.

The village became a free burgh of barony of the Maxwells of Innerwick, under a charter of 22 May 1630. When the charter was granted the most populous settlement in the parish was Skateraw. However the charter gave the Maxwells the right to place their burgh anywhere, and so they chose the site of the present village. The charter gave them the right to two annual fairs, each of two days’ duration, and a weekly market, on Thursdays. They were also grant the right to create a tollbooth and prison but these were never built.

Alexander Carse, the painter, is said to have been baptised here in 1770, although the village itself is not of such great antiquity; the old primary school, village hall and Parish Church all date from around 1784. The majority of the buildings created at this time are made from sandstone. A large number of the buildings in Innerwick are listed as having architectural or historical importance.

Most of the population worked in agriculture. The community looked after itself and even created the Innerwick Funeral Society, whose main purpose was to provide funds to ensure the proper burial of any member.

== Modern village ==
Innerwick has a school, an outdoor education centre and church. The outdoor centre which was formerly the old school and schoolhouse. This has recently undergone refurbishment and modernisation and is regularly used by schools in the county, as well as groups from further afield. There is also a village hall.

In 2024 it was announced that the church building had been sold, and consent granted for it to be converted into a house.

== Listed Buildings and Scheduled Monuments ==
The village has several listed buildings:

- House with Gatepiers and Parapet – Probably a later 18th-century 2-storey house with an addition in the early 19th century. Category C
- Knock Cottage with Boundary Walls – Late 18th century, 2-storey, 3-bay house set in slope. Category C.
- Mansewood with stables and boundary walls and Gatepiers – built in 1726 and considerably altered and extended in the late 18th century. Category B
- Birrell's House – Late 18th-century 2-storey cottage built over a burn. Category C
- 1 Temple Mains Cottages – Late 18th-century, plain 2-storey, 3-bay house, possibly raised from single-storey cottage. Category C Now carries the number 4, and has also been known as Grieves Cottage
- Temple Mains, East Range, Cartshed and Granary, Threshing Mill and Engine House with Stalk – Early 19th-century steading with mid-century stalk and engine house. Category B

Just to the south of Innerwick is a scheduled monument, Braidwood hillfort. This fortified settlement is situated on the rounded summit of Camp Hill and has been surveyed and excavated multiple times.

== Transportation ==
The village was formerly served by Innerwick railway station.

== Famous People ==
James William Hunter of Thurston Manor FRSE is buried in Innerwick churchyard, as is Sir John Dunlop Imrie FRSE CBE.

== Images ==
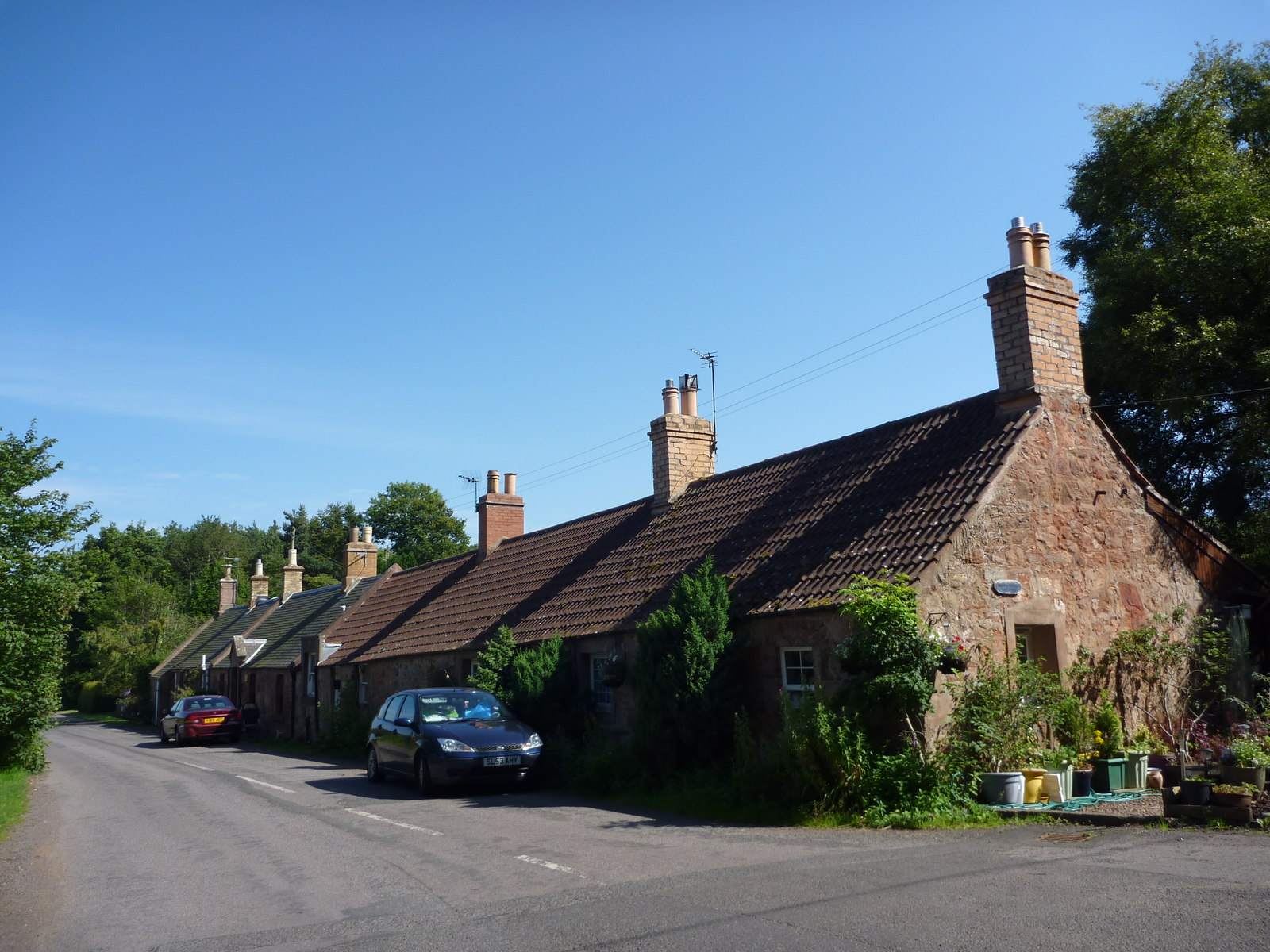
Cottages at Innerwick

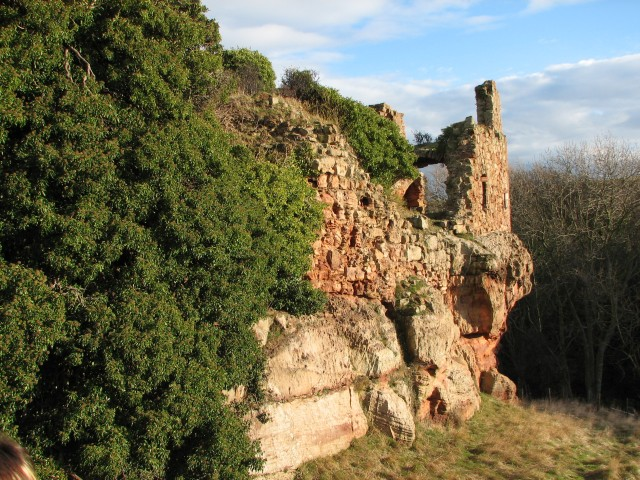
Innerwick Castle

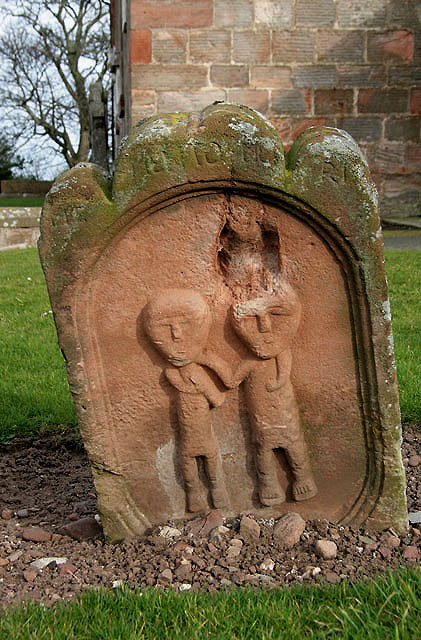
An old gravestone at Innerwick Churchyard

== See also ==
- List of castles in Scotland
- List of places in East Lothian
