= Bemersyde =

Village in Scottish Borders, Scotland

Coordinates: 55.5949°N 2.6417°W

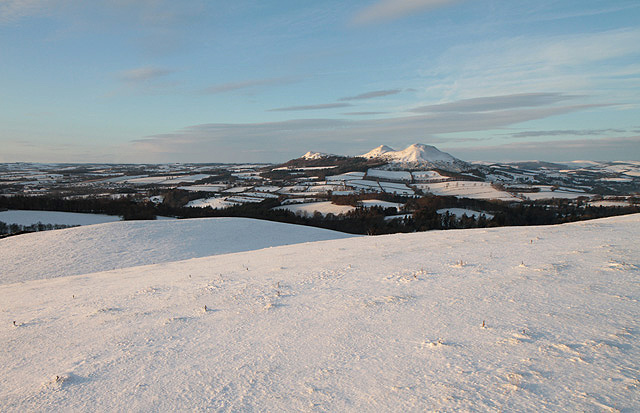
The Eildon Hills seen from Bemersyde Hill

Bemersyde is a hamlet in the Mertoun parish of Berwickshire, in the Scottish Borders. It sits on the left bank of the River Tweed, about three miles east of Melrose.

Bemersyde House, the ancestral home of the Haig family, is the most notable landmark with parts dating to the 16th century.

== Geography ==
Other places nearby include Scott's View, Earlston, St. Boswells, Eildon, Dryburgh, Maxton, Smailholm, Smailholm Tower, and Brotherstone Hill.

There is a Scottish Wildlife Trust Reserve, Bemersyde Moss, that adjoins the Tweed.

== Etymology ==
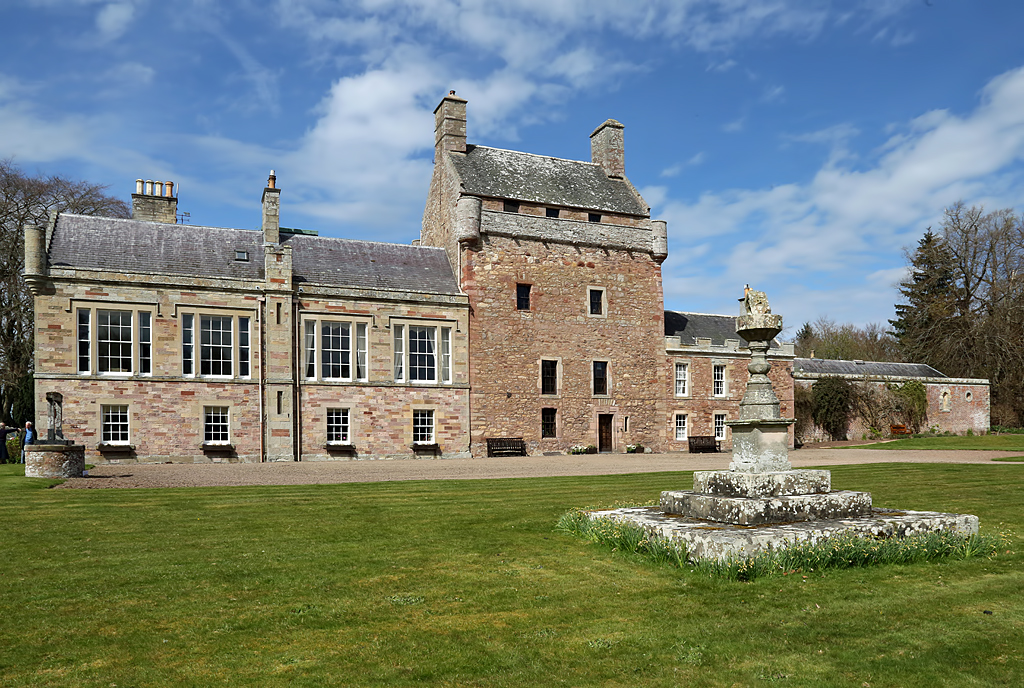
Bemersyde House

Bemersyde is usually explained as "hillside or seat of the trumpeter," from the Old English words bemere "trumpeter" and side "hillside" or "seat, probably named by 6th/7th century Anglican settlers.

== Bemersyde Trophy ==
The Bemersyde trophy is a fishing trophy awarded for catching the largest Salmon fish on the Tweed annually.

== See also ==
- Bemersyde Moss Scottish Wildlife Trust reserve
- List of places in the Scottish Borders
- List of places in Scotland
