= Mertoun =

Coordinates: 55.5777°N 2.6076°W

- Location within the Scottish Borders
- OS grid reference: NT6175231765
- Council area: Scottish Borders
- Lieutenancy area: Roxburgh, Ettrick and Lauderdale
- Country: Scotland
- Sovereign state: United Kingdom
- Post town: Melrose
- Postcode district: TD6
- Dialling code: 01835
- Police: Scotland
- Fire: Scottish
- Ambulance: Scottish
- UK Parliament: Berwickshire, Roxburgh and Selkirk
- Scottish Parliament: Ettrick, Roxburgh and Berwickshire

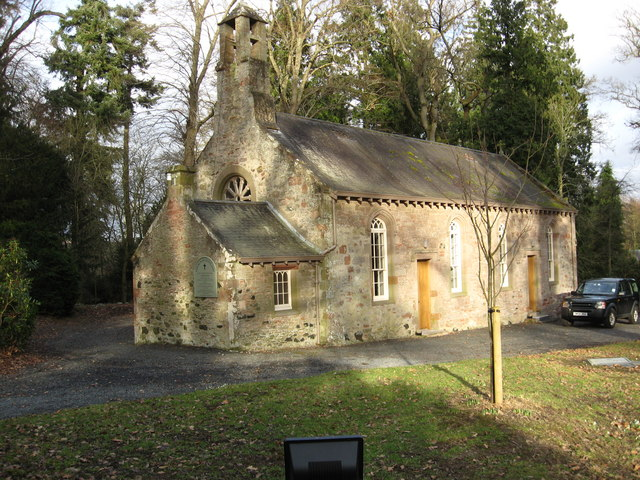
Mertoun parish church

Mertoun is a parish in the south-west of the historic county of Berwickshire in the Scottish Borders area of Scotland. Together with the parish of Maxton, Roxburghshire it forms the Maxton and Mertoun Community Council area. It was included in the former Ettrick and Lauderdale District of Borders Region, by the Local Government (Scotland) Act 1973, from 1975 to 1996.

The parish is bounded by the Berwickshire parish of Earlston to the north and by the Roxburghshire parishes of Smailholm and Makerstoun to the east, Maxton and St Boswells on the south and Melrose in the west. Maxton, St. Boswell's and Melrose lie on the other side of the River Tweed, which forms the southern and western border of the parish.

The parish includes the hamlets of Dryburgh and Clintmains, the historically important sites of Dryburgh Abbey, Mertoun House, Mertoun Bridge and Bemersyde House. Also the statue of William Wallace at Bemersyde.

Mertoun Church was erected in 1658 and restored in 1820 and 1898. It stands in a wood near Mertoun House ½ mile south-east of Clintmains. The date 1658 is carved in stone above one of the doors. For church purposes the parish is united with Maxton and linked with St Boswells and Newtown St Boswells.

The original church of 1241, not on the same site, was dedicated to St Ninian. Robert Haig of Bemersyde built himself a stall or "laird's loft" in the old church in 1594. His neighbours, the Kers of Shaws and Dalcowie, took offence and dismantled it.

Mertoun (1845)

A Parochial Board was established under the Poor Law (Scotland) Act 1845. With the Local Government (Scotland) Act 1894 the Parish Council was established. Civil parishes in Scotland, as units of local government, were abolished in 1929 but have been used later for census and other purposes.

The civil parish has an area of 6377 acres and a population of 309 (in 2011).
