= William Mair =

William Mair may refer to:

- William Mair (South Australian politician) (died 1897), member of the South Australian House of Assembly
- Bill Mair (1900–1964), Australian politician, member of the Victorian Legislative Council
- William Mair (chemist) (1868–1948), Scottish pharmacist and manufacturing chemist
- William Mair (moderator) (1830–1920), Scottish minister
- William Crosbie Mair (died 1831), Scottish physician
- William Gilbert Mair (1832–1912), soldier, resident magistrate, and judge in New Zealand
