= Darnick =

Village in the Scottish Borders

Coordinates: 55°36′N 2°45′W

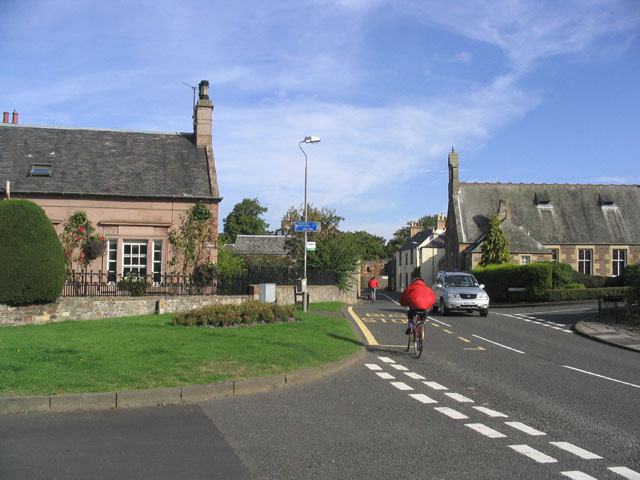
- Abbotsford Road

- Location within the Scottish Borders
- Population: 540 (2020)
- Council area: Scottish Borders
- Lieutenancy area: Roxburgh, Ettrick and Lauderdale
- Country: Scotland
- Sovereign state: United Kingdom
- Post town: MELROSE
- Postcode district: TD6
- Dialling code: 01896
- Police: Scotland
- Fire: Scottish
- Ambulance: Scottish
- UK Parliament: Berwickshire, Roxburgh and Selkirk
- Scottish Parliament: Ettrick, Roxburgh and Berwickshire

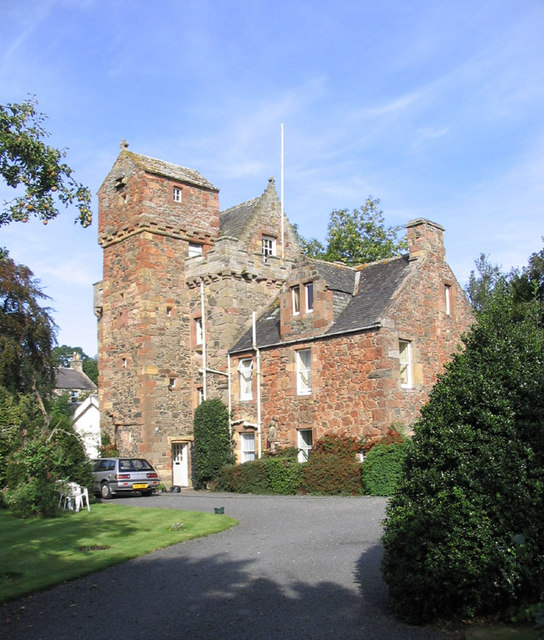
Darnick Tower

Darnick is a village near Melrose in the Scottish Borders area of Scotland, in the former Roxburghshire. The name was first recorded in 1124, and has changed from Dernewic, Dernwick and Darnwick to the present Darnick. Darnick Tower was built in c. 1425, and another tower house, Fisher's Tower, is still recognisable by its remains.

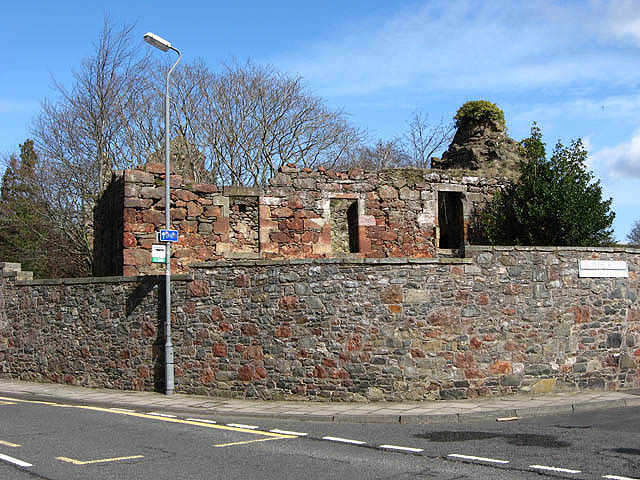
Fisher's Tower

Skirmish Hill by Darnick is the site of a battle which took place on 25 July 1526 between the Scotts of Buccleuch and the Kerrs of Ferniehirst, trying to intercept King James V who was then under the guardianship of Archibald Douglas, 6th Earl of Angus.

John Smith of Darnick created the Wallace Statue at Bemersyde House. His family were builders and masons during the first half of the 19th century, and they have to their credit an extension to Abbotsford, Dryburgh Abbey House, Eckford Church, Gattonside House, Hawick North Bridge, the bridge over the Hermitage Water, Melrose Parish Church, and Yetholm Parish Church.

Places nearby include Abbotsford, Buckholm, Eildon, the Gala Water, Galashiels, Gattonside, Lindean and Newtown St Boswells.

== See also ==
- List of places in the Scottish Borders
- List of places in Scotland

== Sources ==
- A walk around Darnick, described by Nigel Tranter in his 'Illustrated Portrait of the Border Country' 1972
