= Lauderdale =

Geographical district in the Scottish Borders, Scotland

Coordinates: 55°43′48″N 2°44′56″W

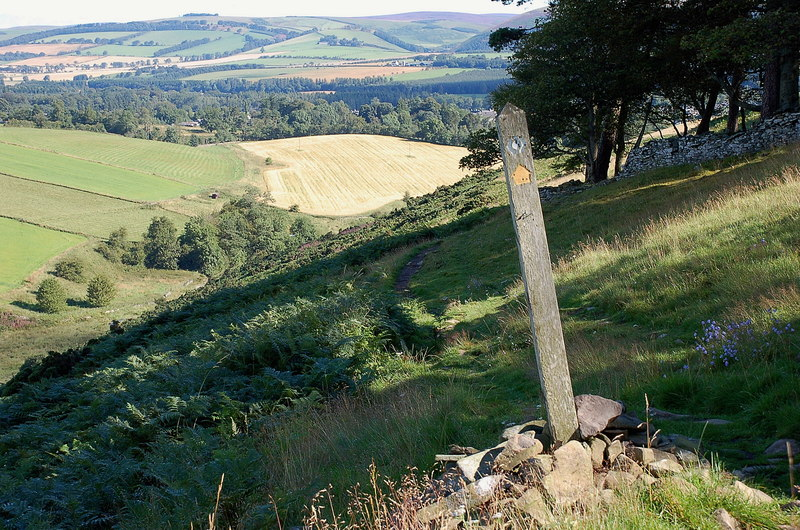
The Southern Upland Way entering Lauderdale

Lauderdale (Scottish Gaelic: Srath Labhdair) is the valley of the Leader Water (a tributary of the Tweed) in the Scottish Borders. It contains the town of Lauder, as well as Earlston. The valley is traversed from end to end by the A68 trunk road, which runs from Darlington to Edinburgh.

== Roman road ==
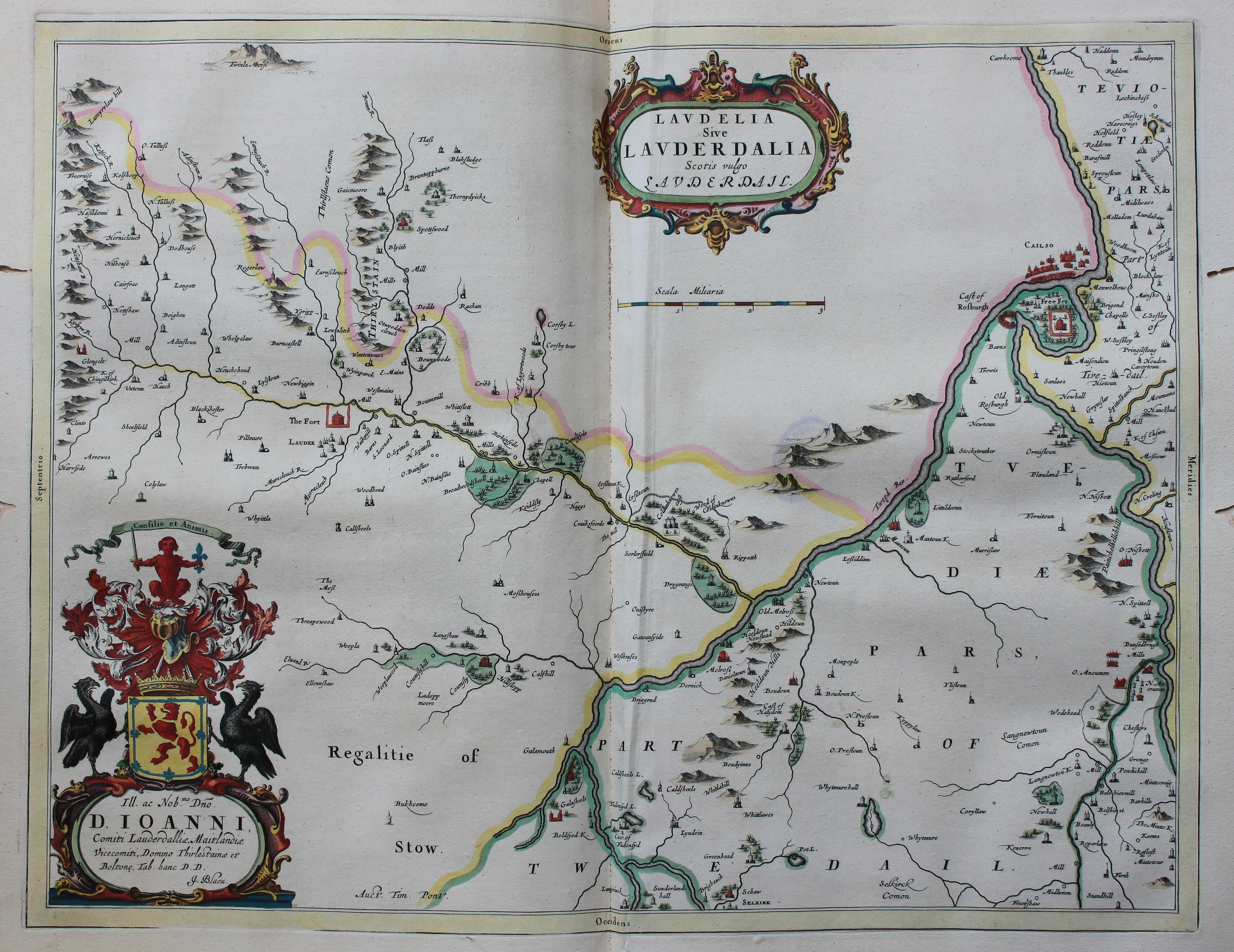
Map of Lauderdale from the Blaeu Atlas of Scotland (1654)

Many ancient camps, and many tumuli, are found in Lauderdale. The Roman road into Scotland, Dere Street, which means "the road into the country of the wild animals", crossed a ford at Newstead, near Melrose, where there had been a Roman fort and garrison, and entered Lauderdale. Dere Street is said to have been reconditioned by King Malcolm Canmore and probably used by him in his almost constant warfare against England. The Roman road has now been traced from the Tweed through Lauderdale to Soutra.

== Etymology ==
Lauderdale's name comes from the town of Lauder rather than the Leader Water. The relationship between the names "Leader" and "Lauder" is very obscure; despite their similarity, they may have different origins. Alternatively, they may both go back to a Britonnic root meaning "cleansing water". The name of the valley is first attested in the late 12th century as Lauuedderdale.

== Medieval period ==
Symeon of Durham (d. c1130) claimed that the "land beyond the Tweed from the place where rises the river Whiteadder on the north as far as to the place where it falls into the Tweed; and all the land which lies between the river Whiteadder and another river which is called the Leader towards the west; and all the land which lies on the eastern side of that river called the Leader, as far as to the place where it falls into the Tweed towards the south; and all the land which pertains to the monastery of St. Baldred called Tyninghame, from Lammermoor even to Eskmouth, pertains to the land of Lindisfarne."

King David I of Scotland created a feudal Lordship of Regality of Lauderdale which he awarded to one of his favourites, the Anglo-Norman Hugh de Morville (d. 1162), whom he also made Constable of Scotland. The boundaries of his fief are still unclear, but the town existed before de Morville's arrival, the Lauder family already holding various lands direct from the Crown prior to this, part of which was the estate attached to Whitslaid Tower. Encroachment by the livestock of the abbeys of Melrose and Dryburgh into the royal forest of Lauderdale led to disputes with its keepers, the Morville lords. In 1164, Dryburgh Abbey yielded Colmslie and adjacent woodland between the Leader and Gala Waters to Melrose.

The de Morvilles of Lauderdale failed in the male line and their Lordship passed by marriage to Alan of Galloway, and a charter exists of "Alani constabularii Scotie, de Alwentchawis" (Allanshaws) in which mention is also made of "terras in territorio de Lauuedir". The Lordship passed to his grandson, John Balliol, and after his forfeiture Robert The Bruce granted it to Sir James Douglas, his great supporter. Archibald Douglas husband of Princess Margaret, daughter of King Robert III, had a reconfirmation c1390 of the Lordship of "Lauderdaill" as heir of the Earl of Douglas. Archibald is herein also called "Lord of Galloway, Lord of Annandale, and of Lowedre". Finally the Douglases were also forfeited.

Towards the southern end of Lauderdale is the town of Earlston, an ancient superiority of the Earls of Dunbar or March. "Robertus de Lauuedirr tunc noster seneschallus" witnessed a charter of "Patricii de Dunbar, comitis Marchie" during the reign of Robert the Bruce, and "Robetus de Lawedre, consanguineus noster" (a cousin) witnessed a charter of "Georgii comitis Marchie" relating to Sorrowlessfield, a still extant property on the (A68) road south of Earlston in the reign of Robert III.

== Geography ==
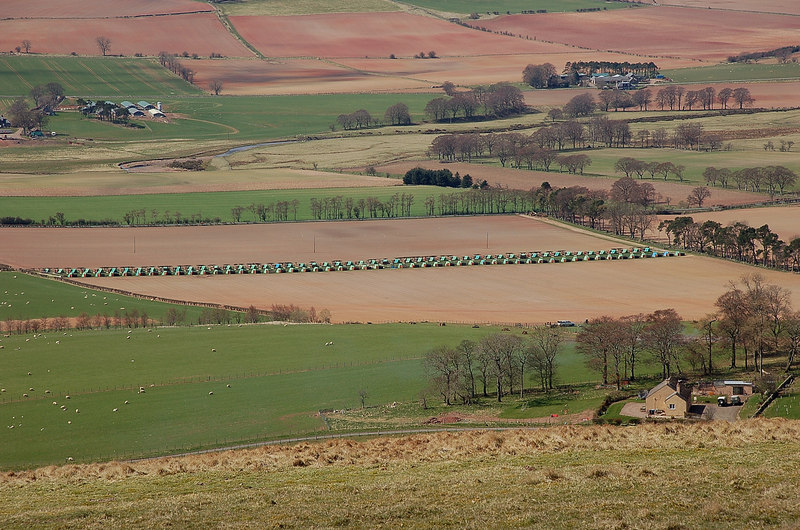
Fields in Lauderdale

Southern Lauderdale could be considered to commence in the vicinity of Newstead. In the north Lauderale ends at part of the Lammermuir Hills where they reach 1733 feet, where in winter the weather can be severe, often leading to road closures. The full length of Lauderdale exceeds ten miles (16 km) and its breadth varies from three to seven miles.

Up until the 17th century Lauderdale was an immense forest. From the time of Malcolm Canmore, at least, it was a Royal hunting ground. The entire district between the Leader and Gala Waters was covered with Lauder forest, "the property of the Lauders of Lauder from a very early date" and which was still in the possession of the family of Lauder of that Ilk through to the late 17th century.

Today Lauderdale is almost completely agricultural.

The principal country house is Thirlestane Castle, the seat since 1595 of the Earl of Lauderdale, and where annual horse trials are held.

The district is part of the Scottish Borders Council's region.

== See also ==
- List of places in the Scottish Borders
- List of places in Scotland
- "All Signs Point to Lauderdale"
