= Leader Water =

River in Lauderdale, Scottish Borders, Scotland

Coordinates: 55.60643°N 2.67225°W

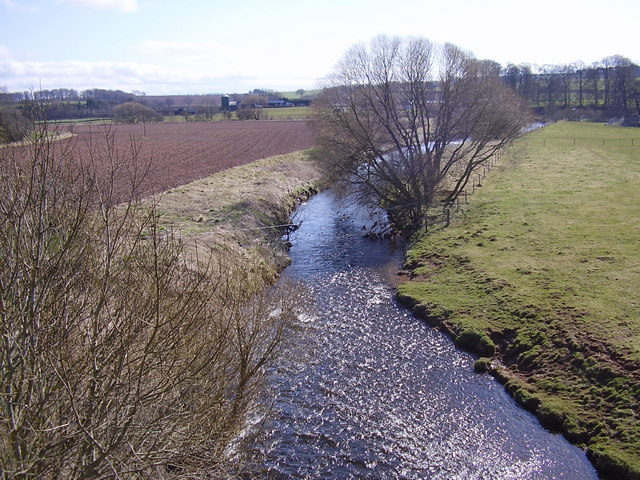
River Leader near Lauder

Leader Water is a small tributary of the River Tweed in Lauderdale in the Scottish Borders. It flows southwards from the Lammermuir Hills through the towns of Lauder and Earlston, joining the River Tweed at Leaderfoot.

== Course ==
The feeder burns of the Leader Water are the Headshaw Burn, the Hillhouse Burn and the Kelphope Burn. They combine at the Carfraemill Hotel and the village of Oxton. The river is now sandwiched between the A68 and the A697, and it has absorbed the Cleekhimin Burn, Harry Burn, Washing Burn and Earnscleugh Burn.

The Leader Water now passes to the east of the town of Lauder, by Thirlestane Castle. The A679 bridges the river which continues past Lauder Barns, West Mains and St Leonards where the Leader receives his final feeder burn, the Boondreigh Burn. It now sticks closely by the A68, near the Whitslaid Tower, the Blainslies, Galadean, Birkhill, Chapel-on-Leader, and Leadervale.

After passing through the outskirts of Earlston, the course of the river is almost done, as it skirts some woodland, and after passing Drygrange, it joins the Tweed at Leaderfoot Viaduct.

Nearby are Scott's View, Bemersyde House, Bemersyde Moss, Carolside, Dryburgh Abbey, the William Wallace Statue and the Roman forts at Newstead (Trimontium).

== River Tweed tributaries ==
- Whiteadder Water, Blackadder Water
- River Till, Eden Water, River Teviot, Leader Water, Leithen Water, Quair Water, Eddleston Water, Manor Water, Lyne Water, Holms Water

== Gallery ==
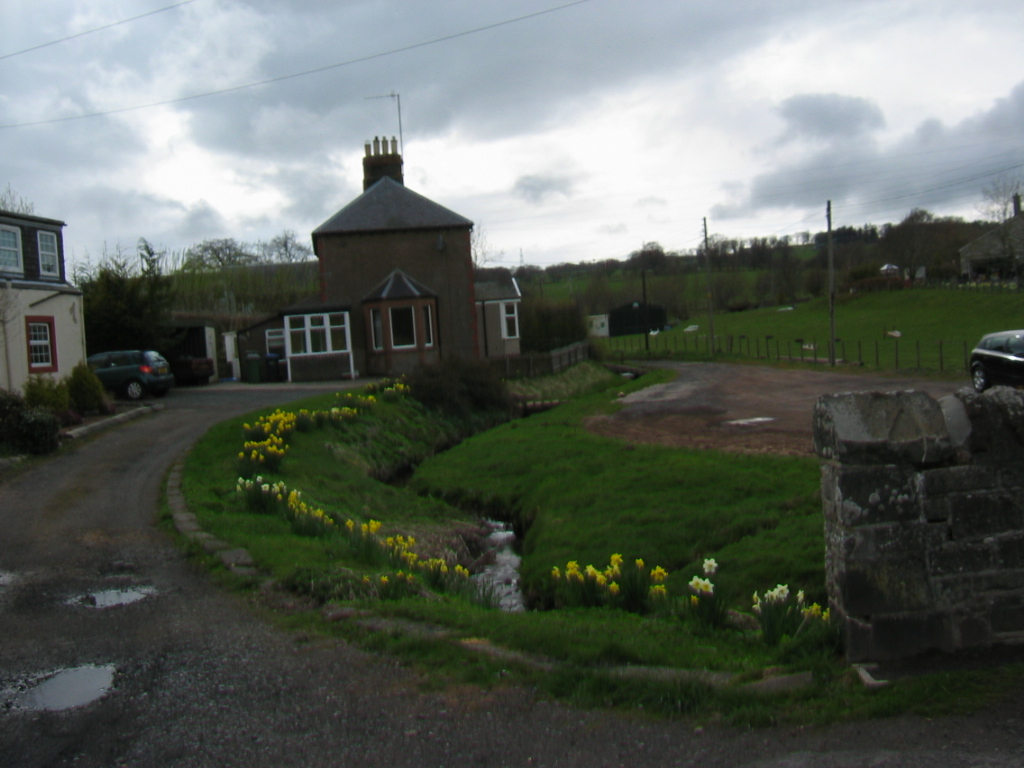
Leader Water at Oxton Mains

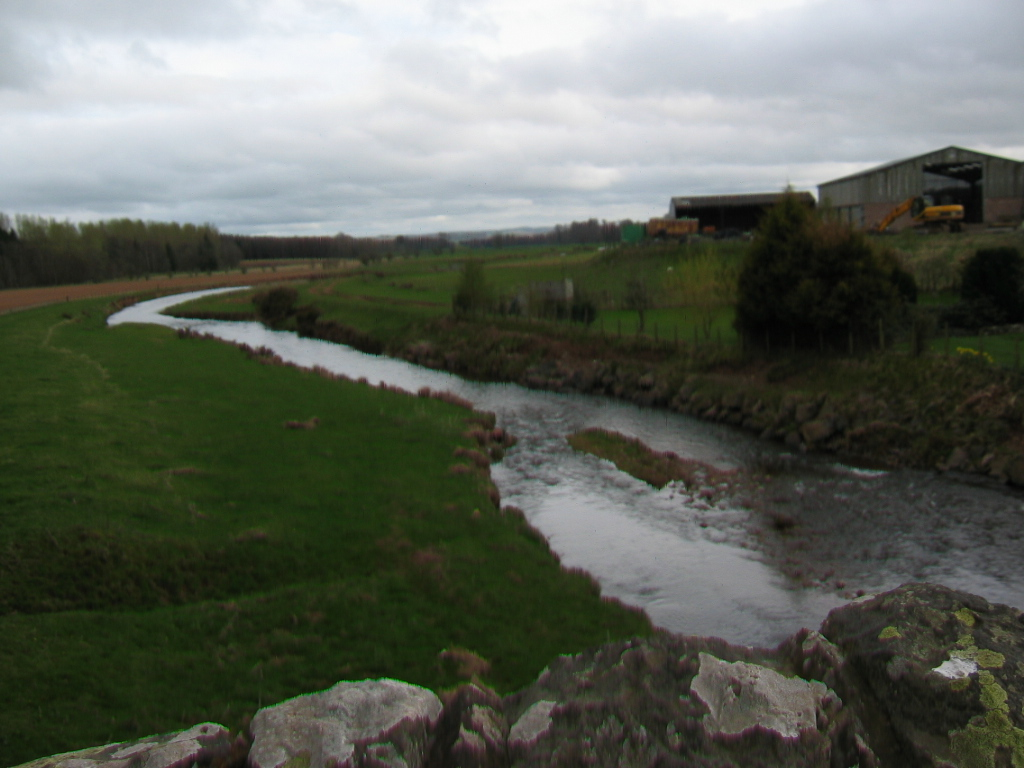
Leader Water at New Mills, Scottish Borders

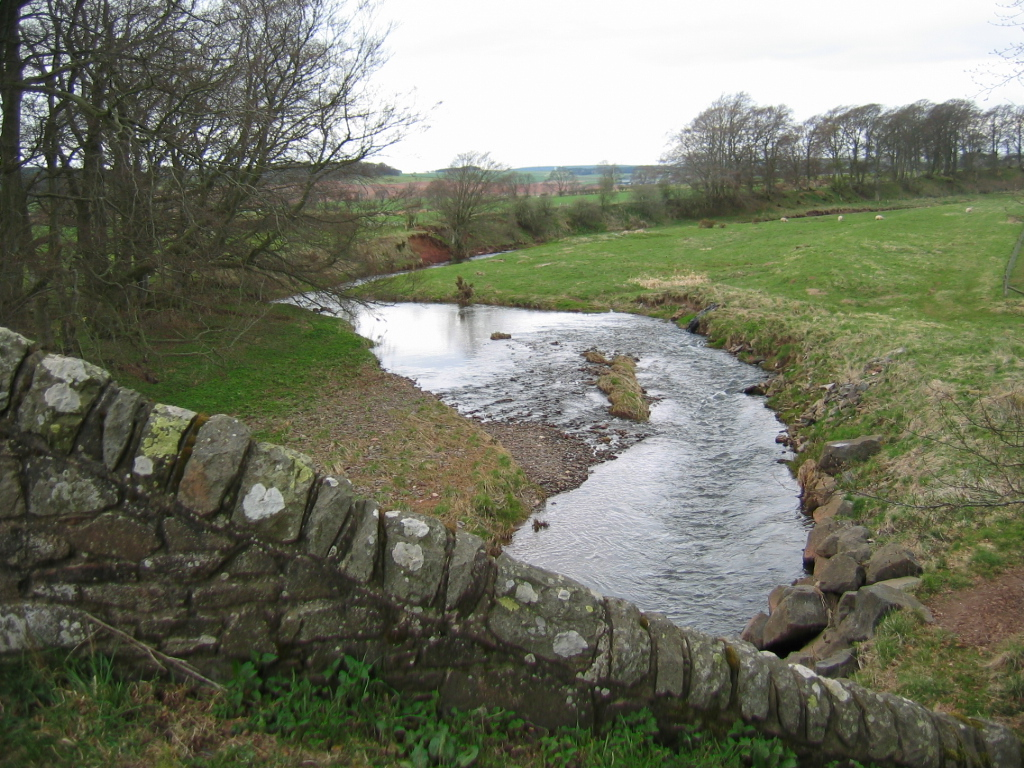
Leader Water at New Mills

== See also ==
- List of places in the Scottish Borders
- List of places in East Lothian
- List of places in Midlothian
- List of places in West Lothian
