= Clintmains =

Village in Scottish Borders, Scotland, UK

Coordinates: 55.5852°N 2.6161°W

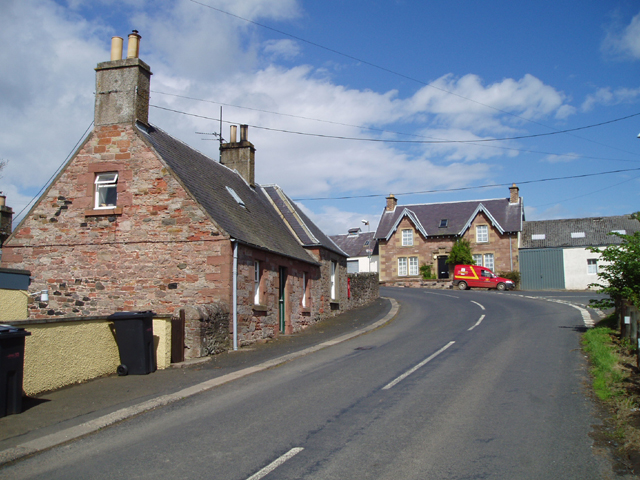
Clintmains

Clintmains is a village by the River Tweed in the parish of Mertoun. It is to the east of Newtown St Boswells, in the Scottish Borders area of Scotland within the former county of Berwickshire.

Places nearby include Bemersyde House, Dryburgh Abbey, Scott's View and the Wallace Monument

The village lies on the route of the Borders Abbeys Way.

== See also ==
- List of places in the Scottish Borders
