= Buckholm =

Village in Scottish Borders, Scotland

Coordinates: 55.6389°N 2.8245°W

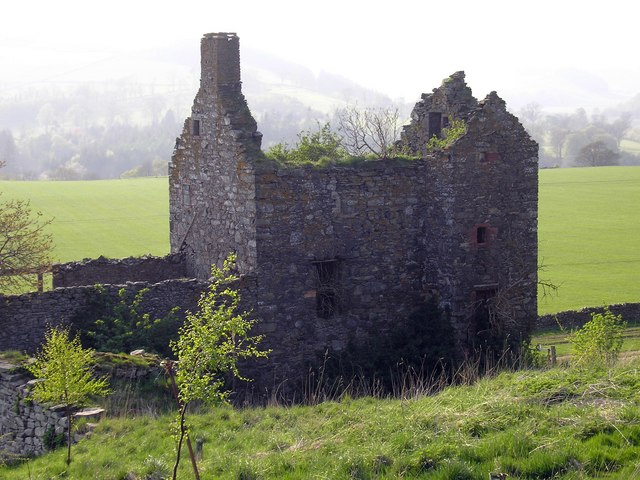
Buckholm Tower

Buckholm is a farm near to the A7, in the Scottish Borders, Galashiels area of Scotland.

Places nearby include Abbotsford, the Bow Castle Broch, Clovenfords, Darnick, Eildon, the Gala Water, the Lugate Water, and Stow.

Buckholm Tower was built in 1582 by the Pringle family and is at the foot of Buckholm Hill.

== Folklore ==
The ruin of Buckholm tower is home to a legend dating back to the 18th century:

According to the tale, the local laird, James Pringle was an evil man, who hunted covenanters with hounds. He mistreated his wife and son so badly that they eventually left him, and he became infamous amongst the locals for his cruelty towards women in particular.

Because he was known to be a government supporter he was called upon one day by the local Dragoons to help derail an illegal assembly of Covenanters. Knowing the area, Pringle was able to deduce the group's location, but they had received some prior warning, and had dispersed, all except two men, a father and son. The father had been thrown from his horse and his son had stayed to tend to him.

Pringle was ready to kill the men on sight, but the Captain of the Dragoons suggested that the men may have some valuable information and so James Pringle was asked to house them in the dungeon of Buckholm Tower for the night while the Dragoons went back to town to update their commanders, promising that someone would come to escort the prisoners the next day.

After the Dragoons left, Pringle dined alone, drinking heavily, and becoming more and more wrathful as a result. Eventually he got up and headed for the dungeon, as he got there, he was met with several of his servants, many of whom had been disturbed by cries of distress from within. The father had taken a turn for the worse, and needed help badly, so his son repeatedly cried out for help. Pringle entered the dungeon and beat them both, the servants heard screams and then a dragging noise, which then quieted. The laird reappeared, intent on returning to his drink but was interrupted by a knocking on the front door. When the servants answered they saw the man's wife had come to find her husband and son.

With a furious cry Pringle grabbed the woman and dragged her to the dungeon. She screamed at what she saw there, her husband and on bloodied from the beating, their carcasses hanging from hooks in the ceiling. Pringle screamed at her, calling her an old witch, and she drew herself up, cursing the laird for what he had done.

Ever after that Pringle was convinced he was cursed, having many instances of believing he was being chased by hounds, after riding his horse or while sleeping in the tower. He dies a painful death shortly afterwards and on the anniversary of his death every year, spectral figures of the laird and dogs appeared outside the tower, him running for his life.

"The Rev Henry Davidson (1714-1749) is reported to have performed an exorcism and ‘cast out the Deil of Buckholm’ and put an end to his ‘nightly wanderings’."

== See also ==
- Aikwood Tower
- List of places in the Scottish Borders
- List of places in Scotland
- Clan Pringle
