= Dryburgh Abbey Hotel =

Coordinates: 55.580109°N 2.649261°W

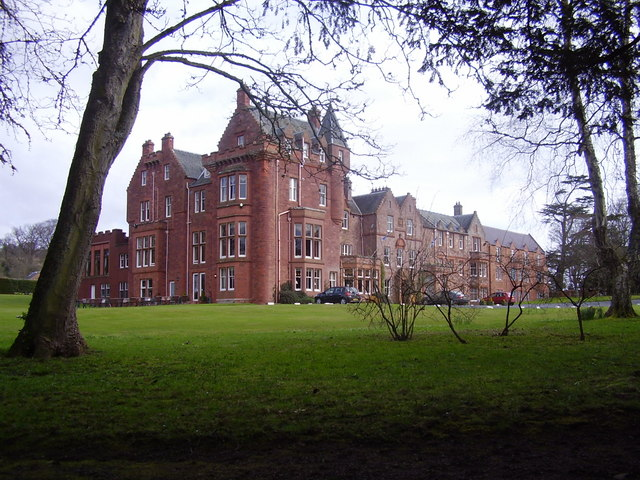
- Dryburgh Abbey Hotel
- Interactive map of the Dryburgh Abbey Hotel area

General information
- Location: St Boswells near Melrose
- Opening: 1932

Other information
- Number of rooms: 38
- Number of suites: 2
- Number of restaurants: 2

Website
- www.dryburgh.co.uk

Dryburgh Abbey Hotel is a baronial country house, located on the banks of the River Tweed, in Dryburgh about 5 km south east of Melrose in the Scottish Borders. The modern house was first constructed in 1845 and it was converted into a hotel in 1932. It is next to the ruins of Dryburgh Abbey and part of the former churchyard and its burials are within the grounds.

The former house had two access lodges, an Upper Lodge and a Lower Lodge.

== History ==
=== Dryburgh Abbey House ===
Nearby Dryburgh Abbey House was owned by David Erskine, 11th Earl of Buchan. He commissioned extensive garden and restoration works around the estate incorporating the Abbey as a partial ruin within the house grounds. This also included the erection of the nearby Temple of the Muses and the Statue of William Wallace, Bemersyde.

=== Country House 1845-1932 ===
The original core of the current building was constructed in 1845. At that time it was a private residence and the home of Lady Griselle Baillie. The house was modernised in 1875 by Lord Jerviswoode, Lady Griselle's brother, and remained in the family until 1929 when it was purchased by the Scottish Motor Traction Company.

=== Hotel, 1932-present ===
The Scottish Motor Traction Company added the east wing and launched it as a “Tourist Hotel” in 1932. The hotel changed hands several times over the intervening years.

In 1997, prior to a further extension of the hotel, an archaeological survey was carried out found sherds of unstratified post-medieval pottery.

In 2007, the hotel was taken over by a new company owned and managed by the Wallace family.
