= Dryburgh Bridge =

Dryburgh Bridge may refer to the following footbridges over the Tweed in Scotland:

- Dryburgh Abbey Bridge, a cable-stayed footbridge (1817–1818), replaced by a suspended-deck suspension bridge (1818-1838)
- Dryburgh Suspension Bridge, a suspended-deck suspension bridge erected in 1872
