= Rhymer's Tower =

Castle in Scottish Borders, Scotland

Coordinates: 55°38′10″N 2°40′53″W

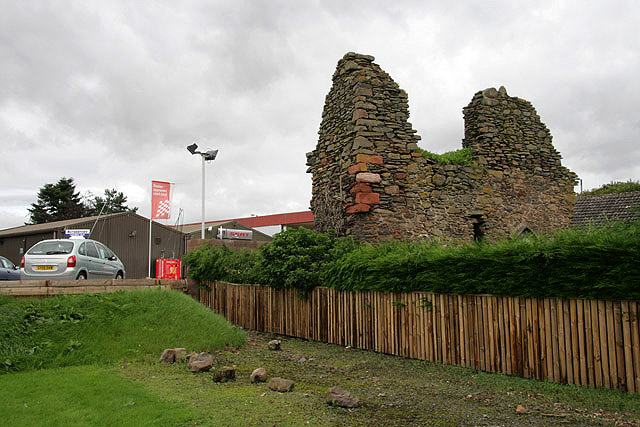
Ruins of Rhymer's Tower in 2009.

Rhymer's Tower, also known as Earlston Castle, is located near the village of Earlston, Scottish Borders, Scotland. The castle was the caput baroniae of the barony of Earlston. It was owned by the Lindsay family in the 12th century and passed to the Dunbar family in the 13th century.

The ruins of a 16th-century border peel are all that remain.
