= Whitslaid Tower =

Castle in Scottish Borders, Scotland

Coordinates: 55°41′33″N 2°42′19″W

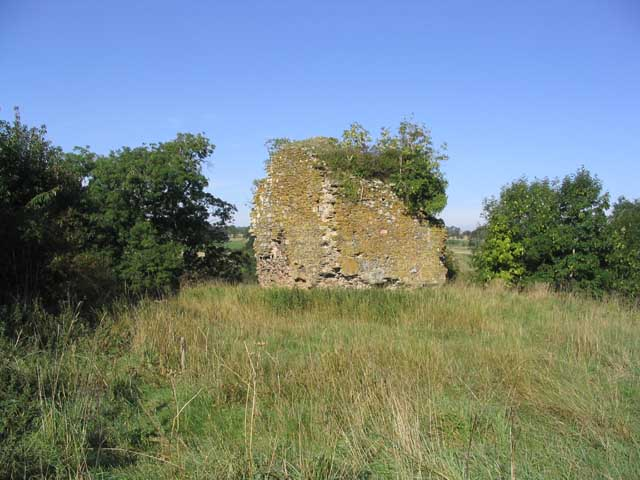
Ruins of Whitslaid Tower

Whitslaid Tower was an ancient Berwickshire seat of the Lauder family for over 300 years. It is today a ruin high above the eastern bank of the Leader Water, 2 miles (3.2 km) south of the burgh of Lauder, in the Scottish Borders. In feudal times it fell within a detached segment of the King's personal Barony of Renfrew.

== The tower ==
It stands on an abrupt eminence, shaded with old ash trees, and behind it is a flat open space sufficient for a garden and the offices attached to the residence of a landowner in the ancient warlike times with which it is associated. An old dirt road winds round it in a gully leading north from the Leader Water, the whole immediate area being commanded by the fortress. The walls of this square pele are now in ruins. The huge vault on the ground floor remains largely intact and the turnpike stairs situated within the thick walls still takes one to the first floor level. The ceiling of the vault is of a quarried greywacke that splits into thin slabs, which are fitted edgeways with little art. In the 1880s when more of the building was intact at the top could be seen a square aperture for pouring boiling liquids such as melted pitch on the heads of assailants. The main living apartments were on the third floor, still intact in the 19th century, as was the roof. Both have now collapsed. Several of the foundation stones are immense rolled unsquared boulders, that must have been dragged there by oxen. The northern end is built of unquarried stones, that may have been collected from the fields or the river sides, their angles being worn off like stones rolled by water, or polished by the glacial drift. This end is now badly decayed, not helped by trees rowing through it. Most of the stones incorporated in the building are of greywacke; several of the corner blocks have been picked out; and the dressed stones of the fireplaces and windows have been stolen.

== Whitslaid and the Lauder family ==
There are Letters of Bailiary by Robert, Steward of Scotland (later Robert II King of Scots), Earl of Stratherne and baron of Renfrewe, with consent of John Steward, Earl of Carrick, his eldest son, constituting Alan de Lawedre, Crown tenant of Whytslade, their bailie of the lands and tenancies of Byrkynsyde, Ligeardwod [Legerwood], Morystoun [Morristoun], Whytslade and Auldynstoun, within the sheriffdom of Berwick-upon-Tweed, with the power to hold courts at any place in the lordship he pleases, to punish excesses, repledge men dwelling on their lands to their liberties etc., and to do any other thing pertaining to the office of bailie, dated 16 October 1369. One of the witnesses was Sir John de Lyle [or d'Lisle], whose family held Stoneypath Tower, near Garvald but in the parish of Whittingehame.

Two years later, on 30 June 1371, several charters were confirmed to Alan de Lawedre: in two "Alano de Lawedre, Lord of Whitslaid", had re-confirmed to him by the Crown, the lands of Whytslaid (it is stated that he is already the feudal tenant there), Birkensyde, Legerwood, and Morriston, in Berwickshire, and the lands of Mertoun, Roxburghshire, (Mertoun had been forfeited by Alan le Suche), plus half the lands of the Regality of Lauderdale and half of the fulling mill at Lauder, forfeited by John de Balliol, plus the lands of Newbyggyng in the constabulary of Lauder, with all the liberties and teinds thereof. The first charter was "signed in the ancient manor of Whitslade" at the Feast of John the Baptist. This indicates that the Tower at Whitslade was already old.

Robert Lauder of Whitslaid appears as a witness in a Notarial Instrument of Sir Alexander Home of that Ilk, signed at Dryburgh on 21 June 1468.

There is a charter by Alexander Lauder of Haltoun made with the consent of George Lauder of Whitslaid his son and apparent heir, dated 21 October 1506. Alexander's sons Sir George Lauder of Whitslaid (later 'of Haltoun') and his brother Alexander Lauder, burgess (and later Provost) of Edinburgh, were also 'senescallos', or stewards, of Kirkcudbright. Both fell at Flodden.

In 1565 a Warrant under the Signet charged the sheriff of Berwick and his deputes to apprehend Gilbert Lauder of Whitslaid (d. before 1590), Richard Lauder younger of that Ilk (k. June 1567), and William Lauder, brother of said Gilbert, who had been put to the horn for the slaughter of deceased George Wedderat, burgess of Lauder, but had fortified and were holding the house of Quhitslaid. Alexander, Lord Home, was ordered to assist the sheriff. Signed at Edinburgh by Queen Mary and King Henry, 20 October 1565.

In February 1572, the Kers of Ferniehirst massed together a force of rebels along with "thieves and broken men" of the Borders. A muster was called, at Jedburgh, of 'fencible persons' in certain southern counties for defence and preservation of the burgh and a general band was subsequently subscribed to by numerous lairds and others amongst whom was Gilbert Lauder of Whitslaid.

In a Deed dated 24 June 1662, a later Gilbert Lauder of Whitslaid agreed to settle a debt of 400 merks due to James Wright, writer (solicitor) in Edinburgh. His cautioner in the original obligation, dated 3 July 1650, was "William Lauder of Gladswood, his brother".

In 1662 a Commission of numerous individuals was authorised to try two witches at Lauder. One of those on it was Gilbert Lauder of Whitslaid. This Gilbert Lauder of Whitslaid appears to have had financial problems and was forced to part with Whitslaid to an advocate named Mr. John Peter. The Tower was still a residence in 1700.

There was another Whitslaid near Selkirk, a Scott property.

== See also ==
- List of places in the Scottish Borders
- List of places in Scotland
