= Eildon (disambiguation) =

Eildon is a committee area of the Scottish Borders Council, and a hamlet within that area.

Eildon may also refer to these places:

- Eildon, Victoria, a township in Australia
  - Lake Eildon, formed by Eildon Dam near the town
  - Electoral district of Eildon, electoral district of the Victorian Legislative Assembly
- Eildon Hill, in the Scottish Borders
