= List of listed buildings in Earlston, Scottish Borders =

This is a list of listed buildings in the parish of Earlston in the Scottish Borders, Scotland.

== List ==
Name	Location	Date Listed	Grid Ref. (Note: Sometimes known as OSGB36, the grid reference (where provided) is based on the British national grid reference system used by the Ordnance Survey. • "Guide to National Grid". Ordnance Survey. • "Get-a-map". Ordnance Survey.)	Geo-coordinates	Notes	LB Number (Note: Historic Environment Scotland assign a unique alphanumeric identifier to each designated site in Scotland, for listed buildings this always begins with "LB", for example "LB12345".)	Image
Thorn Street, The Thorn, Including Carriage And Pedestrian Gateways And Boundary Walls, Washouse & Stable Block				55°38′17″N 2°40′47″W	Category B	6377	Upload Photo
'Fluthers Cottage' By South Croft Park				55°38′17″N 2°40′29″W	Category B	6218	Upload Photo
Carolside				55°39′02″N 2°41′47″W	Category B	2122	Upload Photo
Stables And Cottage Block, Mellerstain				55°38′39″N 2°33′44″W	Category A	2124	Upload Photo
Kirklands				55°36′27″N 2°40′10″W	Category B	2121	Upload Photo
Earlston Parish Church (Church Of Scotland), Graveyard, Walls And Gates				55°38′26″N 2°40′04″W	Category C(S)	2117	Upload Photo
Old Bridge, Earlston				55°38′09″N 2°41′01″W	Category B	2119	Upload Photo
Carolside, Carolside Bridge				55°38′58″N 2°41′50″W	Category B	15149	Upload Photo
Mellerstain House				55°38′39″N 2°33′41″W	Category A	2123	Upload another image
Rhymer's Tower				55°38′09″N 2°40′53″W	Category B	2118	Upload Photo
Cowdenknowes				55°37′30″N 2°40′22″W	Category A	2120	Upload another image
Mausoleum, Mellerstain				55°38′47″N 2°34′11″W	Category B	2137	Upload Photo
Norman Cottage In Mellerstain Policies				55°38′44″N 2°33′53″W	Category B	2125	Upload another image
Redpath Village Hall				55°36′47″N 2°39′58″W	Category C(S)	6642	Upload Photo
East Lodge, Mellerstain				55°38′50″N 2°33′37″W	Category B	2126	Upload Photo

== Key ==
The scheme for classifying buildings in Scotland is:

- Category A: "buildings of national or international importance, either architectural or historic; or fine, little-altered examples of some particular period, style or building type."
- Category B: "buildings of regional or more than local importance; or major examples of some particular period, style or building type, which may have been altered."
- Category C: "buildings of local importance; lesser examples of any period, style, or building type, as originally constructed or moderately altered; and simple traditional buildings which group well with other listed buildings."

In March 2016 there were 47,288 listed buildings in Scotland. Of these, 8% were Category A, and 50% were Category B, with the remaining 42% being Category C.
