= Haltoun House =

Baronial house in City of Edinburgh, Scotland

Coordinates: 55.903°N 3.396°W

Designations

Inventory of Gardens and Designed Landscapes in Scotland
- Official name: Hatton House
- Designated: 30 March 2001
- Reference no.: GDL00209

Haltoun House c1900

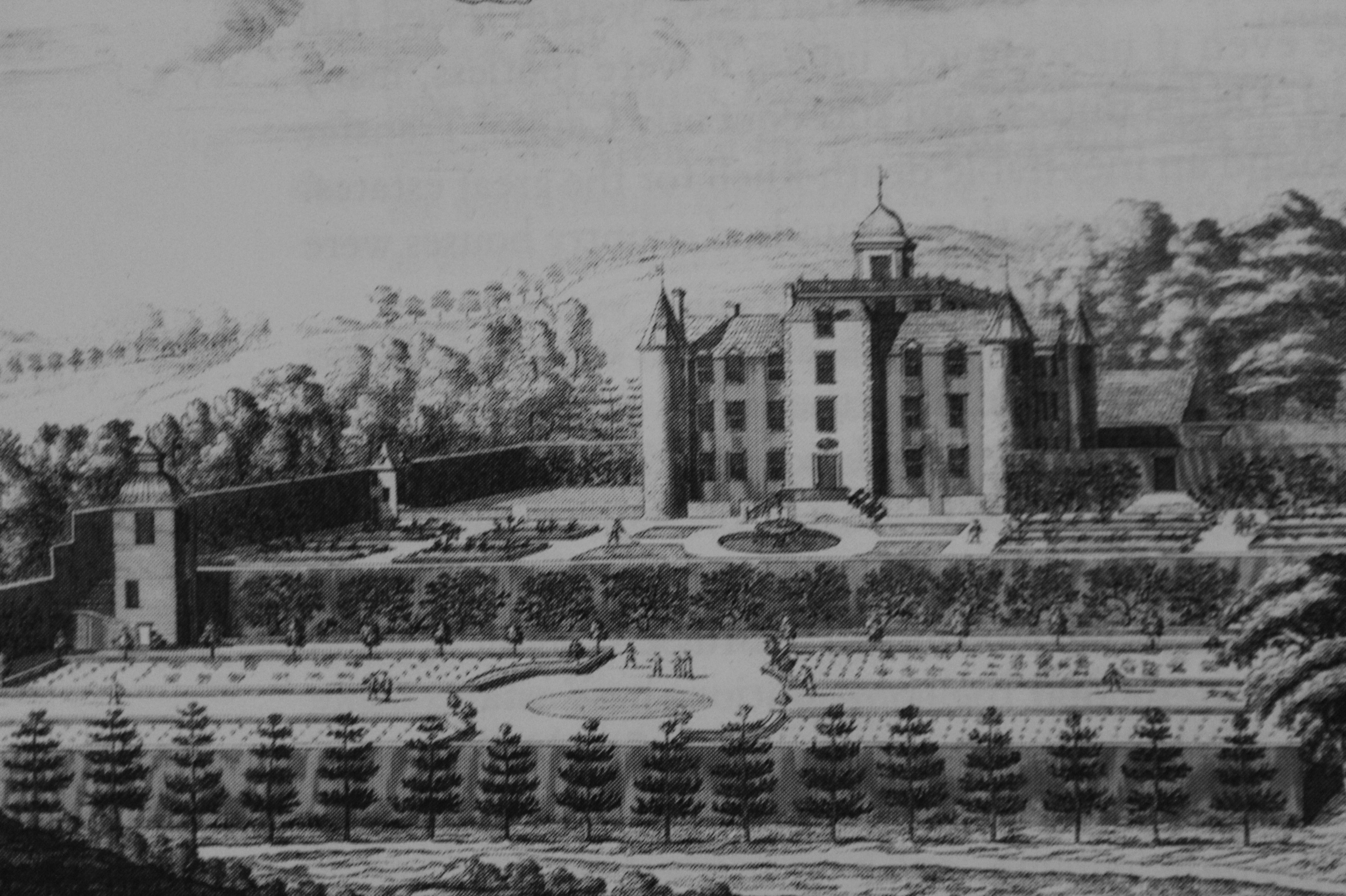
Hatton House c.1690 by Capt. John Slezer

Haltoun House, usually known as Hatton House, (or occasionally Argile House), was a Scottish baronial mansion set in a park, with extensive estates in the vicinity of Ratho, in the west of Edinburgh City Council area, Scotland. It was formerly in Midlothian, and it was extensively photographed by Country Life in September 1911.

== Proprietors ==
The earliest known proprietor John de Haltoun sold the property on 26 July 1377 when Robert II confirmed it upon a court favourite, Alan de Lawedre of Whitslaid, Berwickshire. Alan and his first wife, Alicia, daughter of Sir Colin Campbell of Lochawe, already owned (1371) the adjoining lands of Norton. George de Lawedre of Haltoun, Provost of Edinburgh, Alan's second son by his second wife, Elizabeth, was put in fee of Hattoun in 1393. He died in 1430 and left only daughters as co-heirs. His brother, Sir Alexander Lauder became the ancestor of the Hattoun cadet branch. The first laird of Hattoun is sometimes said to be Sir George de Lawedre who married Helen Douglas, a sister of Lord Douglas, daughter of Archibald Douglas, 3rd Earl of Douglas, 'The Grim' (d. 1400). William Lauder of Haltoun had a licence from James I to re-edify Hattoun in 1407. Sir Alexander's great-grandson, another Sir George Lauder of Hattoun, fell at the Battle of Flodden with two of his brothers, James Lauder of Norton, and Sir Alexander Lauder of Blyth

Shortly before James Hepburn, 4th Earl of Bothwell married Mary, Queen of Scots, he stayed at Hatton House in April 1567. Nicolas Hubert alias French Paris rode from Linlithgow Palace to Hatton House with a letter from Mary for Bothwell. James VI of Scotland stayed at Hatton using it as a hunting lodge in April 1589, but returned to Edinburgh over fears for his safety from disaffected lords.

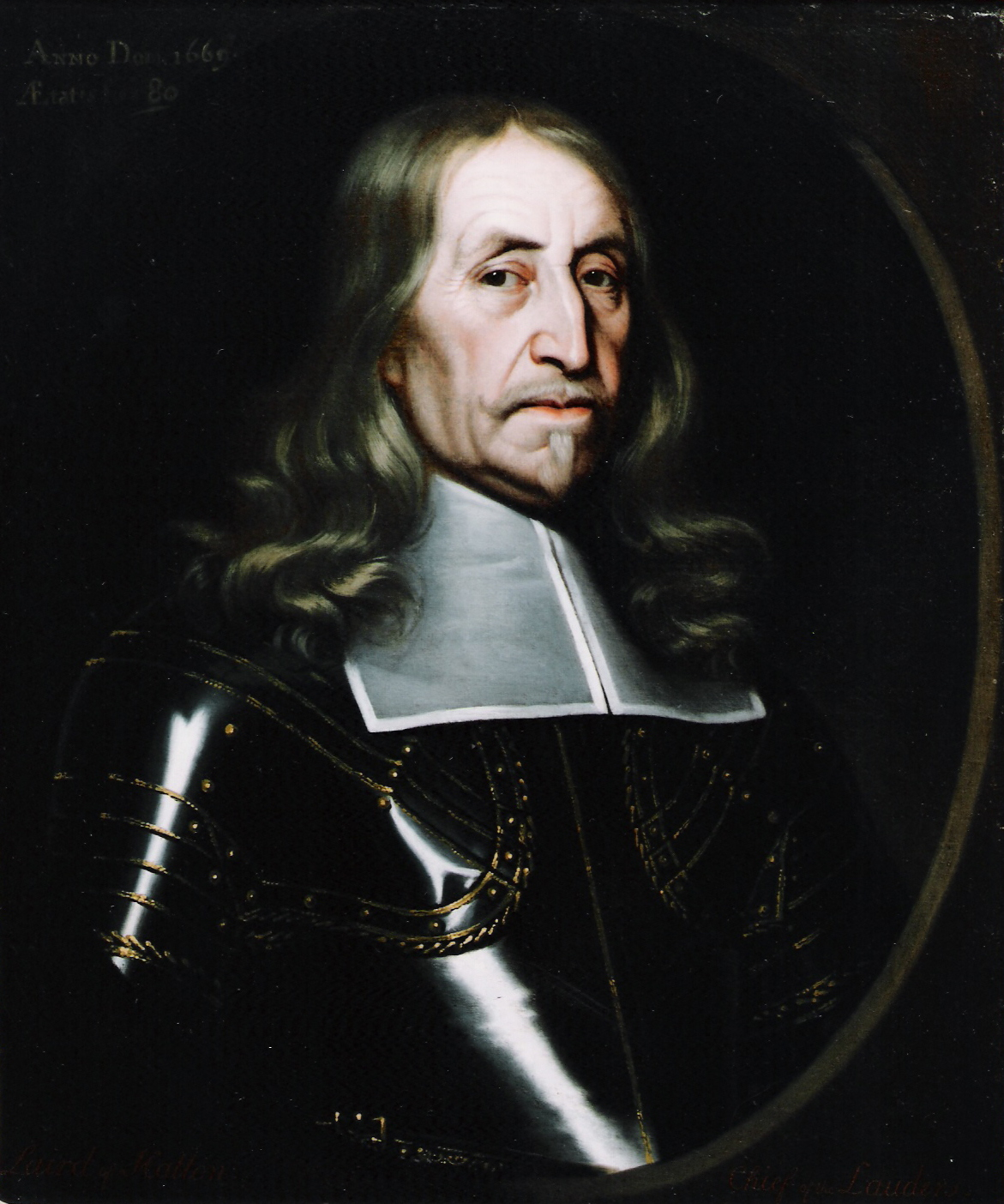
Richard Lauder, laird of Hatton, painted in 1669.

The Haltoun/Hatton estates remained in the Lauder family until the last Laird, Richard Lauder of Haltoun, settled them upon his younger daughter. Richard Lauder was a Justice of the Peace, was Member of Parliament for Edinburghshire in 1621, and in 1647 and 1648 was on the Committees of War for Edinburgh. He was also Commissioner of Excise in 1661. His wife, Mary Lauder, Lady Haltoun, had been born Mary Scot. Richard died in November 1675 in Holyrood Abbey, Edinburgh, and was interred in Ratho Church on the 29th. His portrait (right), by John Scougal, hangs in Thirlestane Castle.

His second daughter, Elizabeth married, in 1652, Charles Maitland, 3rd Earl of Lauderdale and carried Haltoun to him. Haltoun was much closer to Edinburgh than Thirlestane Castle, and with the loss of Lethington the Maitlands made Haltoun House their principal residence (as opposed to seat) until 1792 when the 8th Earl of Lauderdale sold the estate for £84,000 to Miss Henrietta Scott of Scotstarvet, who married William Henry Cavendish-Scott-Bentinck, 4th Duke of Portland. The estate was then 2,000 acres (8.1 km^{2}) of excellent land, the revenue at the time: £3000 per annum. Her trustees sold the estate in 1797 to Sir James Gibson-Craig, 1st Baronet. He broke up the estate into lots, of which that including Haltoun House and 500 acres (2.0 km^{2}) was bought by the Reverend Thomas Randall (who afterwards took the surname of Davidson). He sold Haltoun House to the Earl of Morton in 1870, whose son Lord Aberdour sold it to James McKelvie in 1898. In 1915 it was sold to William Whitelaw, chairman of the London and North Eastern Railway company.

== Haltoun or Hatton House ==
The first Lauders built a massive Pele Tower at Haltoun before 1400, which Hannan refers to as "an L-shaped castle with walls of a uniform thickness of about 10 feet (3.0 m)." Sir William Lauder of Haltoun was a confidant of both King James II and the Earl of Douglas. In 1452 he was the King's personal messenger, sent to escort Douglas to Stirling Castle on a Royal promise of absolute safety, whereupon the Earl was murdered by the King. Haltoun Tower was subsequently besieged by King James and during that siege, Sir William Lauder died. The tower and battlements were subsequently restored to good condition by the King, at Exchequer expense.

The castle became the nucleus of the subsequent greater country house which was built onto and around it. On the east face of the south-east angle tower was a sundial with the monogram "C.M.E.L" for Charles Maitland & his wife Elizabeth Lauder, the monogram being divided by the date 1664, the year in which Maitland commenced or completed dramatic new extensions to the old castle. His son John added the east front in a Renaissance style in 1696 and 1704. It was restored in 1859 and in 1870 the windows were altered.

The interiors were entered through a small entrance hall, panelled in oak brought from Letheringham Abbey, Suffolk, into the main hall, 50 feet (15 m) by 20, panelled also with a magnificent finely-made Jacobean plaster ceiling. Other rooms included a morning room, situated between the library and dining room (both also panelled in oak). On the first floor the saloon and drawing rooms were fitted out with Memel pine panelling, greatly used in Scottish country houses at the time. 'Lord Jeffrey's study' in the tower, was a nine-sided decorative room, with much gilt. The centre of the ceiling was a painting of a man flying away with a lightly clothed female - a classical motif.

Haltoun House was approached by an original avenue, half a mile long, abutted by tall elms and beeches, lime trees, hollies, Yews, and rhododendrons. The principal entrance was at the east through massive gate pillars.

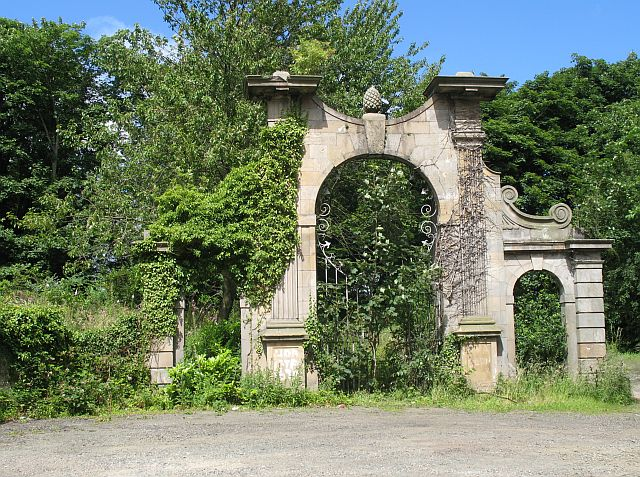
Hatton House, road side gate, remodelled 1829

In 1952 the house caught fire, and was demolished in 1955, during a period when many other country houses suffered a similar fate. All that remains are the terraces along the south side of the house with a two-story pavilion at each end.

A number of structures survive on the estate. The East Avenue Gates, the South Gateway and the South Terrace Wall with pavilions and bath-house are all category A listed buildings while the Garden Temple is Category B listed. The surviving garden, together with these buildings, is included in Historic Environment Scotland's Inventory of Gardens and Designed Landscapes.
