= Carolside, Scottish Borders =

Carolside
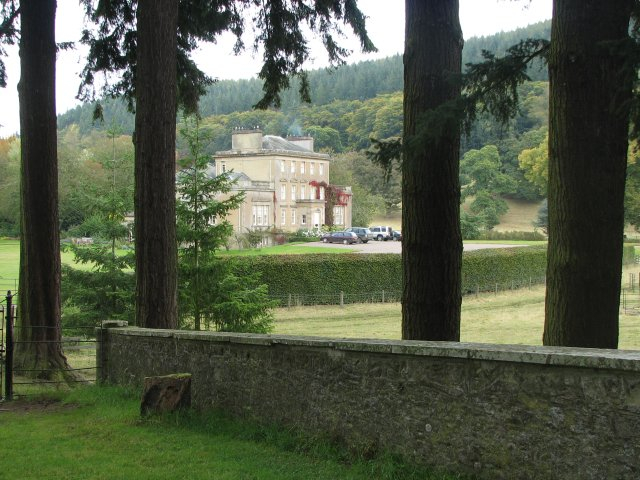
- Carolside

- Location in the Scottish Borders
- 55.6507°N 2.6962°W

Site notes
- Area: 366 acres (148 ha)

Listed Building – Category B
- Designated: 30 January 1981
- Reference no.: LB2122

Inventory of Gardens and Designed Landscapes in Scotland
- Official name: Carolside and Leadervale
- Designated: 29 June 2011
- Reference no.: GDL00088

Carolside is an estate by the Leader Water, in the Scottish Borders. It is located one mile (1.6 km) north of Earlston, in the former county of Berwickshire.

== The house and estate ==
The late-18th-century house is a category B listed building, and is set in a former deer park. It was based on a design for Chesterfield House, Mayfair, London by the architect Isaac Ware. The drawing room contains a fireplace designed by Pietro Bossi, taken from Baronscourt, County Tyrone, around 1948.

The walled gardens include a national collection of pre-1900 Gallica roses, and are open to the public in July each year, as part of the Scotland's Gardens scheme. The grounds of the site are 366 acres (148 ha) in size with a wide variety of trees, some oak and chestnuts being over 200 years old.

Also on the estate is Park Bridge, a balustraded arch bridge linking the policies of Carolside House and those of Leadervale on the other side of the Leader. The bridge dates to the late 18th century, and has been compared with other bridges designed by Alexander Stevens and William Elliot.

== See also ==
- List of places in the Scottish Borders
