= Eildon =

Coordinates: 55.586°N 2.681°W

Eildon is the largest committee area of the Scottish Borders Council, with a population of 34,892 at the census in 2001. It contains the three Eildon Hills, the tallest in the Scottish Borders.

Eildon is the name of a hamlet within the area, just north-west of Newtown St Boswells.

== Places in Eildon committee area ==
- Alewater
- Clovenfords
- Denholm
- Earlston
- Eildon
- Galashiels
- Heriot
- Kilnknowe
- Ladhope
- Langlee
- Lauder
- Lauderdale
- Melrose
- Mossilee
- Netherdale
- Newtown St Boswells
- Scott's View
- Selkirk
- Old Selkirk
- St Boswells
- Tweedbank

== See also ==
- Subdivisions of Scotland
