= William Mair (chemist) =

Scottish pharmacist and manufacturing chemist

William Mair FRSE FCS (1868–1948) was a Scottish pharmacist and manufacturing chemist.

== Life ==
He was born in Osborne Place in Dundee in 1868, the son of Thomas Mair a builder. Around 1890 he is working in the pharmacy of Dundee Royal Infirmary.

He was the main Scottish representative to the London chemical company Fletcher Fletcher & Co.

In 1931 he was made an Honorary Fellow of the American Pharmaceutical Association. In 1939 he was elected a Fellow of the Royal Society of Edinburgh. His proposers were Ralph Stockman, James Pickering Kendall, Hugh Ferguson Watson, Robert Taylor Skinner and George Merson.

He died on 1 December 1948.

== Publications ==
- Pharmacy in Norway (1921)

== Family ==
He was married to Isabella Jane Urquhart (d.1932).
