= William Mair (moderator) =

Scottish minister

William Mair (1830–1920) was a Scottish minister who served as Moderator of the General Assembly of the Church of Scotland during 1897–1898.

== Life ==
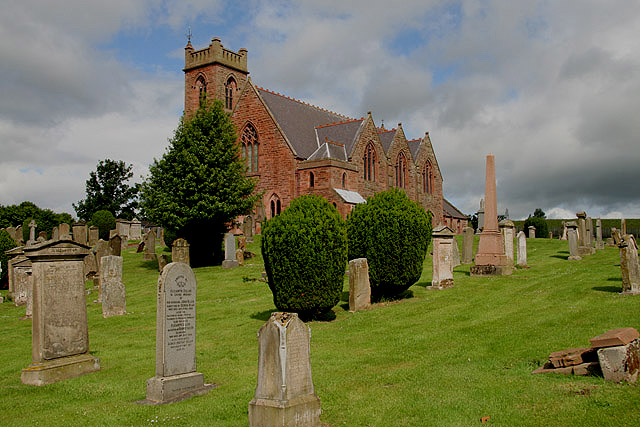
Earlston Parish Church

William Mair spent most of his life as minister of Earlston Church in the Scottish Borders.

In 1897, Mair was elected as the Moderator of the General Assembly of the Church of Scotland. He was succeeded in 1898 by Rev Thomas Leishman.

== Publications ==
- My Life (1911) autobiography
