= William Crosbie Mair =

Scottish physician

Dr William Crosbie (or Crosby) Mair FRSE (died 4 October 1831) was a Scottish physician linked to Mexico.

== Life ==
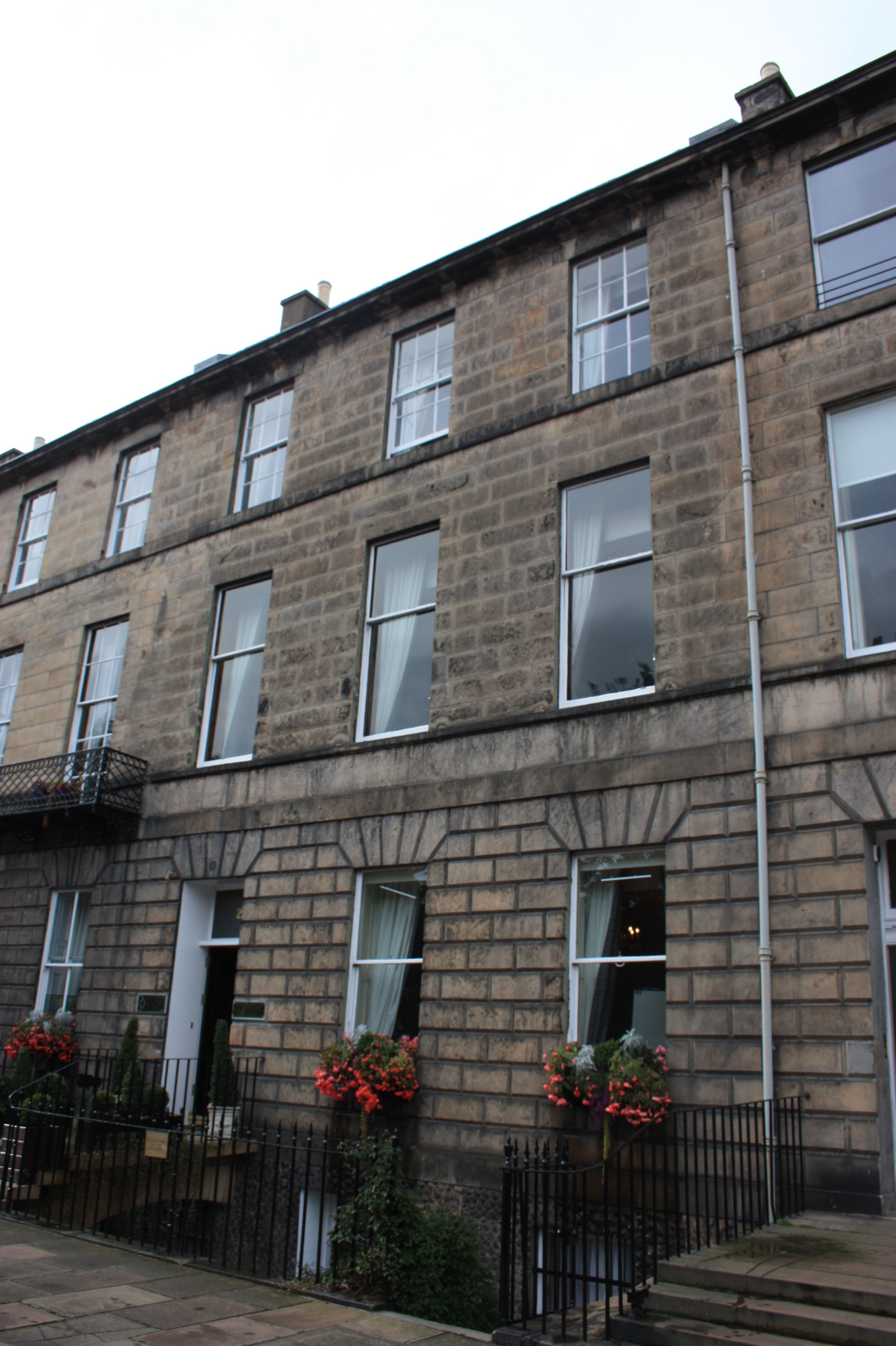
Mair's family home at 29 Abercromby Place, Edinburgh

He was born the son of Col Alexander Mair FRSE, of Fort George. In 1820 the family was living at 29 Abercromby Place in Edinburgh's New Town.

He studied medicine at the University of Edinburgh and then went to Jesus College, Cambridge where he was licensed as a doctor. He was then appointed as personal physician to the Mexican Ambassador in London.

In 1824 he was elected a Fellow of the Royal Society of Edinburgh his proposers being his father.

He died at Duke Street, St James in London on 4 October 1831. His death was possibly a precursor to the cholera epidemic of 1832.

== Family ==
He was married to Miss Siddons. Their son was William Crosbie Siddons Mair.
