= Dryburgh Suspension Bridge =

Bridge in the Scottish Borders, Scotland

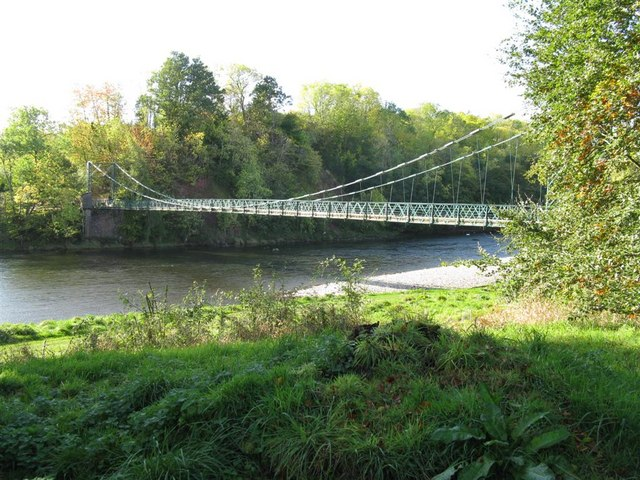
- Coordinates: 55.58071°N 2.65418°W
- Crosses: River Tweed

Location
- Interactive map of Dryburgh Suspension Bridge

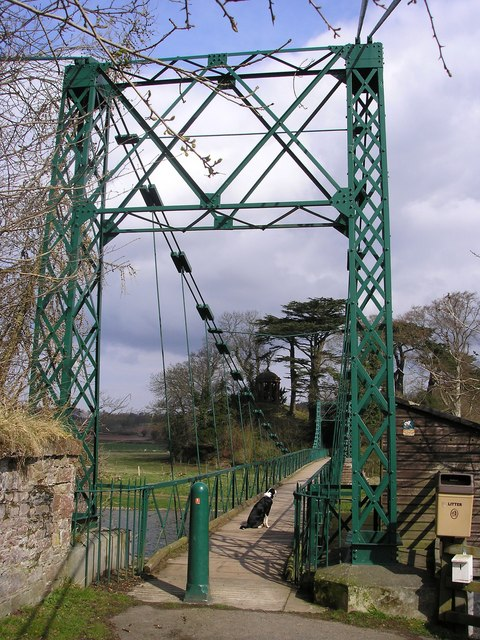
Dryburgh Suspension Bridge

Dryburgh Suspension Bridge is a suspension bridge erected near Dryburgh Abbey, Scottish Borders.

== History ==
The footbridge across the River Tweed was erected in 1872 with a gift intended to allow the Dryburgh villagers to worship at the churches in St. Boswells (part of a ribbon of settlements including Newtown St. Boswells). An earlier bridge nearby, the Dryburgh Abbey Bridge, collapsed in 1818. It is part of the scenic "Three Bridge Loop" with Mertoun Bridge and Chain Bridge at Mertoun House.

== Design ==
It is a relatively simple design with only one suspended span.

== See also ==
- List of bridges in Scotland
