= Dryburgh Abbey Bridge =

Former bridge in the Scottish Borders, Scotland

Coordinates: 55.580712°N 2.654180°W

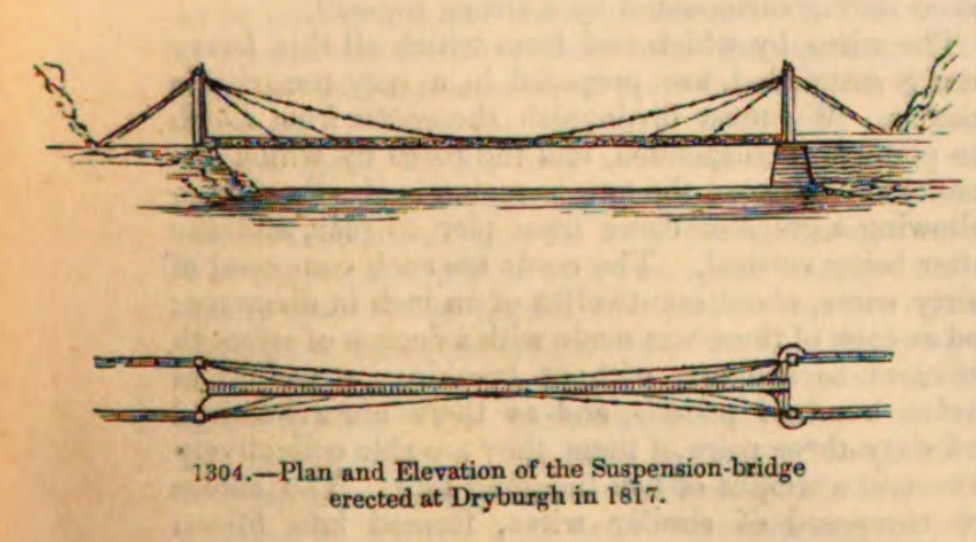
Plan and side-elevation of the 1817–1818 Dryburgh Abbey Bridge

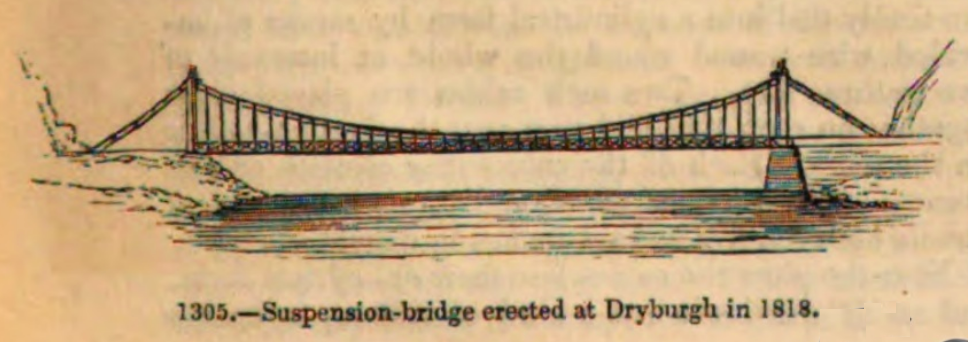
Side-elevation of the 1818–1838 Dryburgh Abbey Bridge

Dryburgh Abbey Bridge was a cable-stayed footbridge of significant historical interest near Dryburgh Abbey, in the Borders of Scotland. It connected the villages of Dryburgh and St. Boswells (part of a ribbon of settlements, including Newtown St. Boswells) across the River Tweed. A crossing had existed here for centuries, originally with a ferry service.

The bridge had been commissioned by David Stewart Erskine, 11th Earl of Buchan, an eccentric Scottish aristocrat who died in Dryburgh. It was 79 metres (259 ft) long. At the time, the cable-stayed type of bridge was rapidly becoming more popular. The Earl opened the completed bridge on 1 August 1817, but in January 1818 it collapsed. One of the designers, Thomas Smith, said of the collapse that due to "high wind increasing to [a] perfect hurricane, it carried off [the] chain bridge, leaving only the fastenings and supports, the work of half a year, demolished in an hour...." After a redesign, a replacement was built, but this too collapsed in 1838, by which time the Earl had been dead for several years.

The 1818 collapse, together with that of a slightly shorter bridge across the Saale River in Germany in 1824, caused the reputation of cable-stayed bridges to decline rapidly, and despite a history dating back to the 17th century, the design fell from favour for several decades, with combination cable-stayed and suspended-deck suspension bridges (such as the 1883 Brooklyn Bridge) gaining favour. Later research in the 1930s, and experience with reconstruction after the Second World War, demonstrated that with sound design, pure cable-stayed bridges are viable, and the first modern design, the Strömsund Bridge in Sweden, was completed in 1955.

Very shortly after the 1818 collapse (between 1819 and 1820) another bridge, the Union Bridge, was built some 40 kilometres (25 mi) downstream. It was an iron suspended-deck suspension bridge, the longest in the world upon its completion. A third Dryburgh Suspension Bridge was built in 1872 to replace the 1838 loss.

== See also ==
- Dryburgh Suspension Bridge
- List of places in the Scottish Borders
