= Scott's View =

Scenic viewpoint in Scottish Borders, Scotland

Coordinates: 55.59971°N 2.64747°W

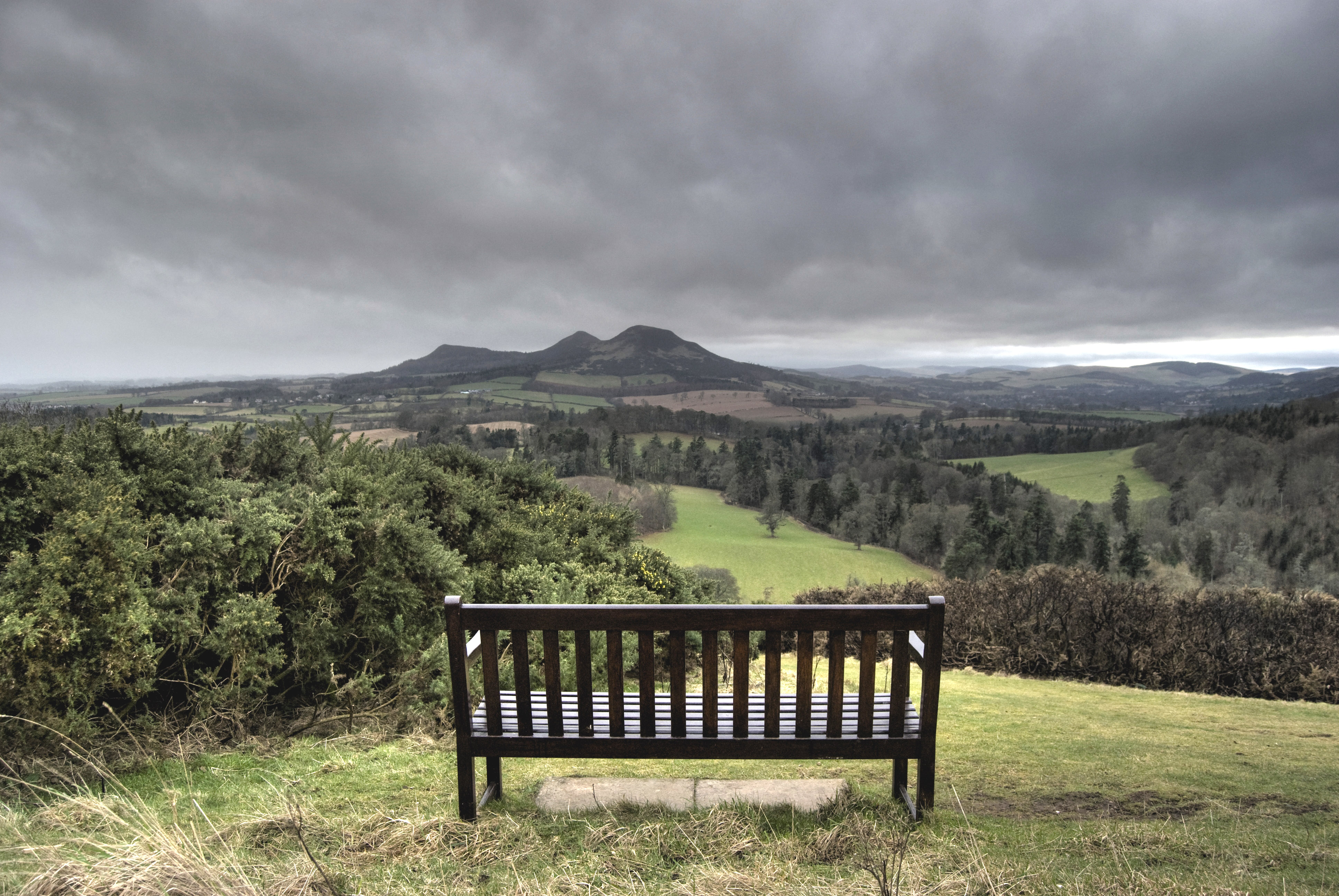
Scott's View on a cloudy day

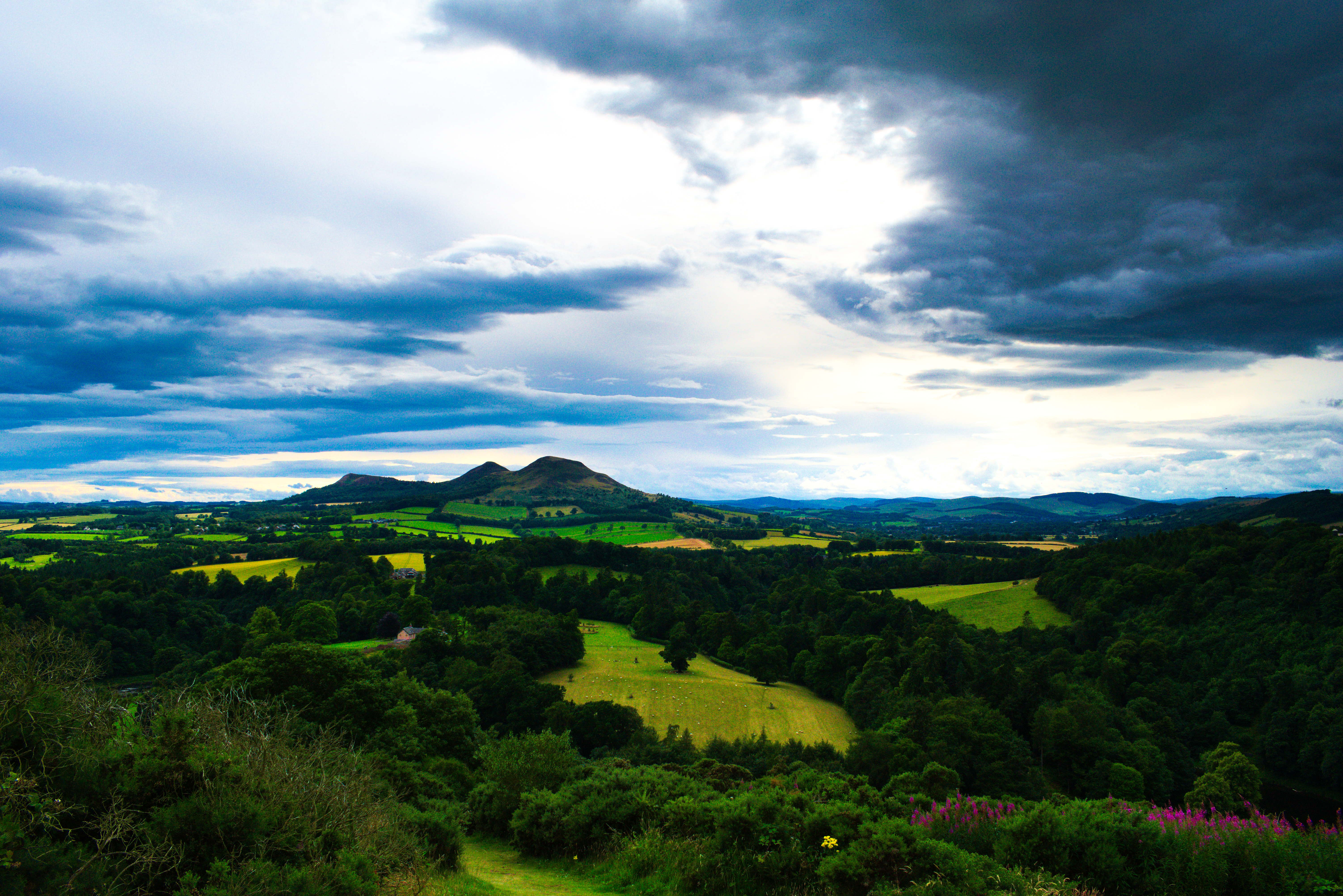
Scott's view in summer, with a view of Eildon Hills

Scott's View is a viewpoint in the Scottish Borders, overlooking the valley of the River Tweed, which is reputed to be one of the favourite views of Sir Walter Scott.

The viewpoint can be located directly from a minor road leading south from Earlston just off the A68 and by travelling north from the village of St. Boswells up the slope of Bemersyde Hill. The view is around 3 miles east of Melrose. The view is to the west, and is dominated by the three peaks of the Eildon Hills. To the south west the view is extensive and open, taking in rolling farmland beyond the village of Newtown St Boswells. Immediately below the viewer is a meander of the Tweed itself, enclosing a peninsula of land on which stood the ancient monastery of Old Melrose, referred to in Bede, where St Boisil welcomed the young St Cuthbert to train following his vision of St Aidan of Lindisfarne in 651ad. Often a fly fisherman can be seen fishing the river. To the north west the viewer looks along the Tweed valley to Melrose. Towards the north-west the viewer can see the Black Hill, a Marilyn near Earlston.

Immediately below the view point, on the cliffs above the River Tweed, is one of the few remaining fragments of semi-natural woodland in the area. The oak trees that remain are the descendants of trees used to supply wood for the manufacture of coffins in the area.

According to a popular story, Sir Walter Scott stopped at this point so often on the way to his home at Abbotsford, that his horses would halt without command. After his death in 1832, his funeral cortège passed this way en route to his burial at Dryburgh Abbey, and his horses stopped at his favourite view to allow their master a last look at the Borders landscape. In fact, although the funeral procession did pass this way, the halt was due to 'some accident'.

- The William Wallace Statue in the grounds of Bemersyde House is a larger than life statue of Scotland's hero, Sir William Wallace.
