= Gala Water =

River in Scottish Borders, tributary of the River Tweed

Coordinates: 55°37′N 2°47′W

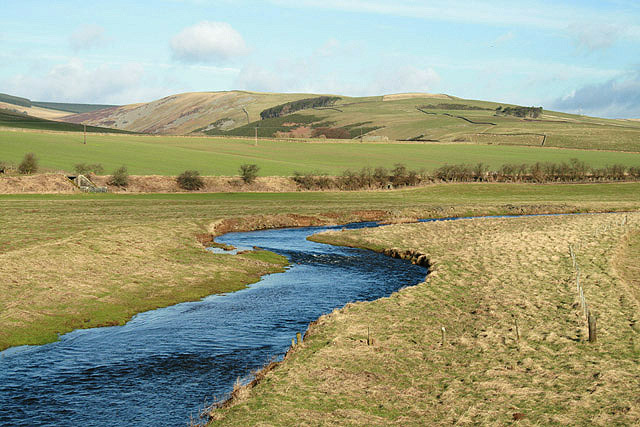

The Gala Water (Lowland Scots: Gala Watter; Scottish Gaelic An Geal Ath) is a river in the Scottish Borders area of Scotland and a left-bank tributary of the River Tweed. It flows in a south-southwesterly direction from Falahill to its confluence with the Tweed just downstream of Galashiels, almost 100 metres (330 feet) above sea level. The Heriot Water is a right-bank tributary coming in from the west, and is larger than the Gala Water before their confluence.

It is sometimes known as just the "Gala", a nickname which is also shared with the town of Galashiels, which it flows through. The "Braw Lads O Gala Watter" is a song about people from Galashiels.

The Gala Water drains an upland catchment of the Moorfoot Hills, mainly used for hill grazing but with some forestry and arable sections. The gauging station at the upstream end of Galashiels (about 4 km (2.5 mi) from the Tweed) has a catchment area of 207 km^{2} (80 sq mi).

The Borders Railway and A7 road both follow the Gala Water, the railway crossing the river 15 times, while the road is largely on the eastern side crossing the Gala Water only twice near Fountainhall.

== Etymology ==
The name Gala may be from the Old English galga meaning "gallows" (Scots galwe), perhaps by back-formation from Galashiels. Or else, Gala may originally be from Brittonic, and derived from *gāl meaning "enmity, hatred" (Welsh gâl), or cognate to the Welsh verb galw, "call" (Cornish galow, "a call"). The river may share an etymology with Gala Lane in Ayrshire, which flows into Loch Doon.

== Hydro power ==
The river was historically used to power textile mills in Galashiels. By the 18th century, there were three water-powered waulk mills. The first mechanised woolen mill in Galashiels was built in 1790, the Wilderhaugh Mill, although later renamed the Wilderbank Mill. This was joined by several other mills in the early 1800s, and more during the middle of the century, although these were latterly also powered by steam engines.

In 2016, £1.5m funding was awarded by the Scottish Government through the Energy Saving Trust and Local Energy Challenge Fund for a study to install modern hydro-electric turbines to generate power from the Gala Water. Initial plans were for an installation of 150 kW, but with the potential to increase this to perhaps 400 kW. As of 2025, this has not been developed, but remains a possibility in future subject to funding.

== Water levels and flooding ==
Just upstream of Galashiels the water depth at the gauging station is typically between 0.19 metres (0.62 ft) and 1.38 m (4.5 ft), although was as deep at 2.88 m (9.4 ft) on one occasion in 2002. The average (daily mean) flow at this location is 3.76 cubic metres per second (133 cu ft/s) and the maximum measured flow was 83.7 m^{3}/s (2,960 cu ft/s).

Galashiels has been flooded from the Gala Water on several occasions. In 1931, the Gala Water was described as a "raging torrent" after 10 hours of rainfall, causing the worst flooding in over 40 years. Several houses and mills were flooded, with their residents being evacuated. Large parts of the town were again flooded in 1894, and several streets were flooded in 2012.

A flood prevention scheme was proposed in 2009. Construction of this started in October 2013 and was finally opened in November 2014. It is designed to protect 140 properties and areas of the town centre from flooding of the Gala Water.

== See also ==
- List of places in the Scottish Borders
- Leader Water

== Gallery ==
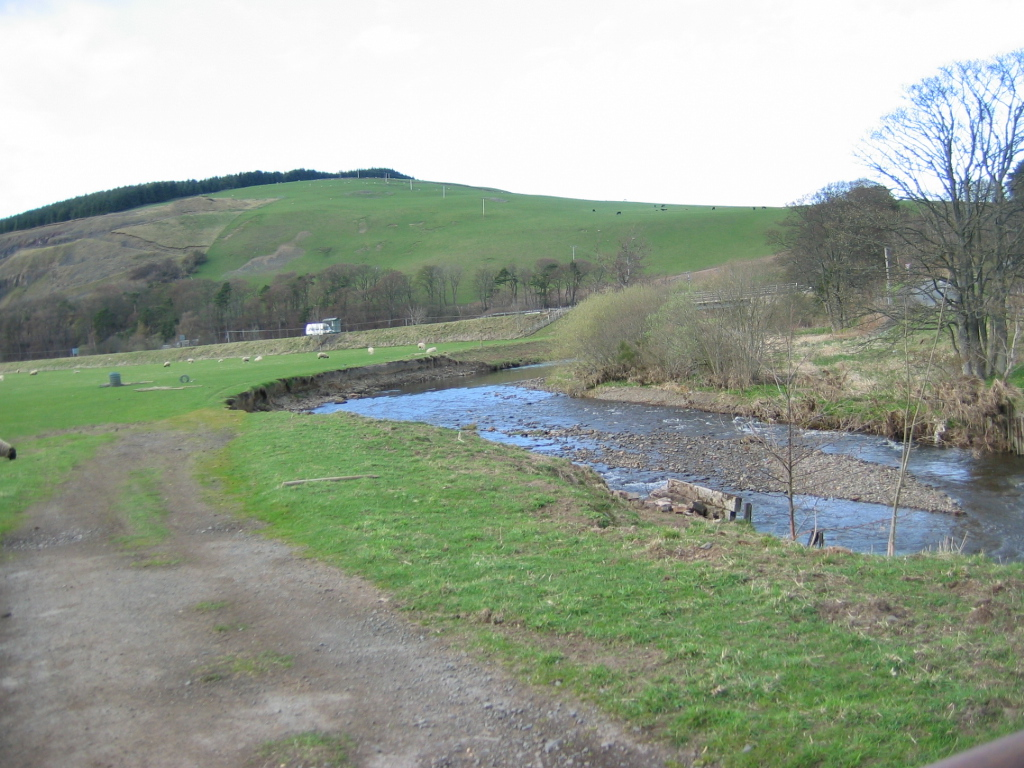
Gala Water at Fountainhall Bridge

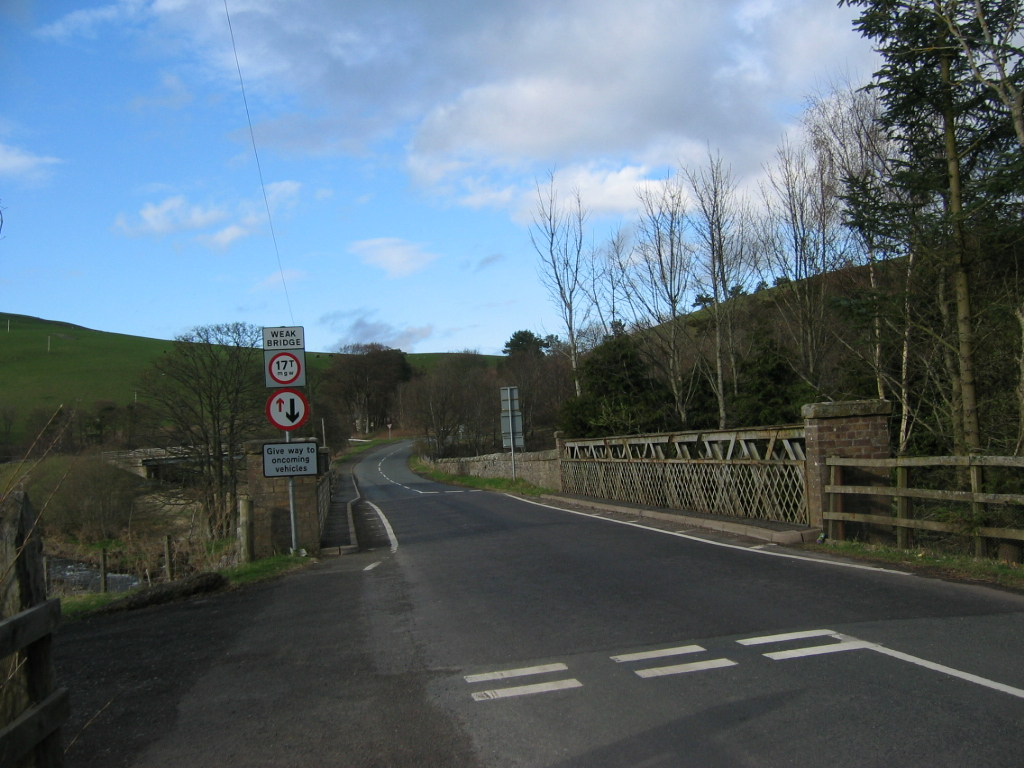
Gala Bridge at Fountainhall

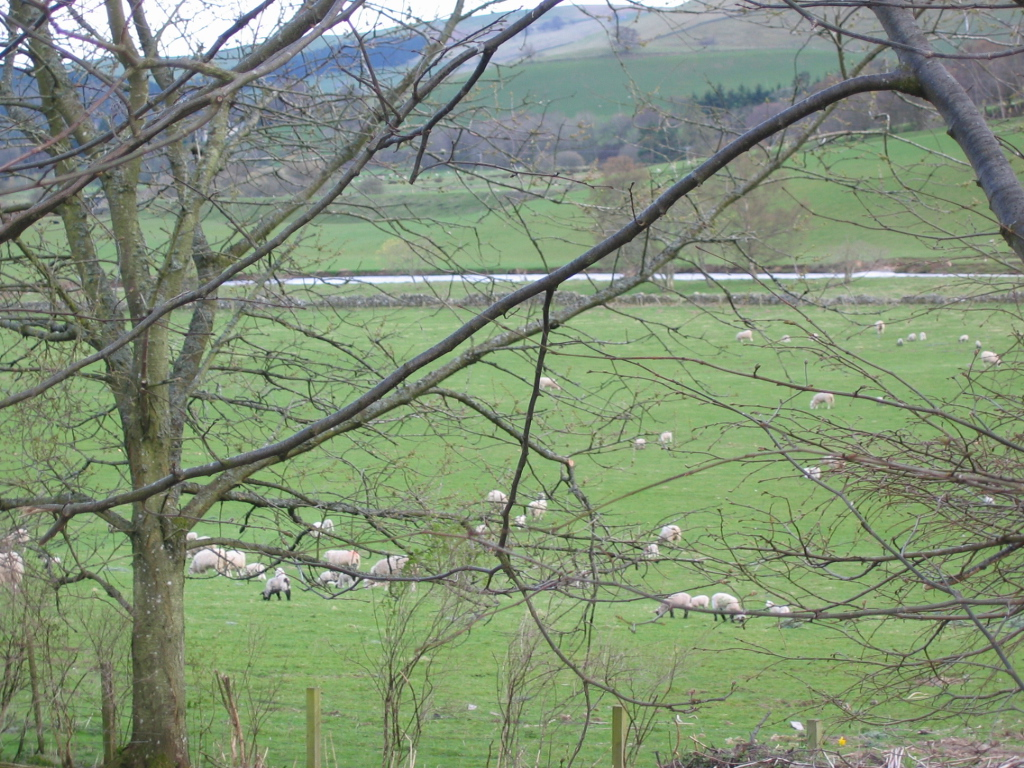
Gala Water near Torquhan

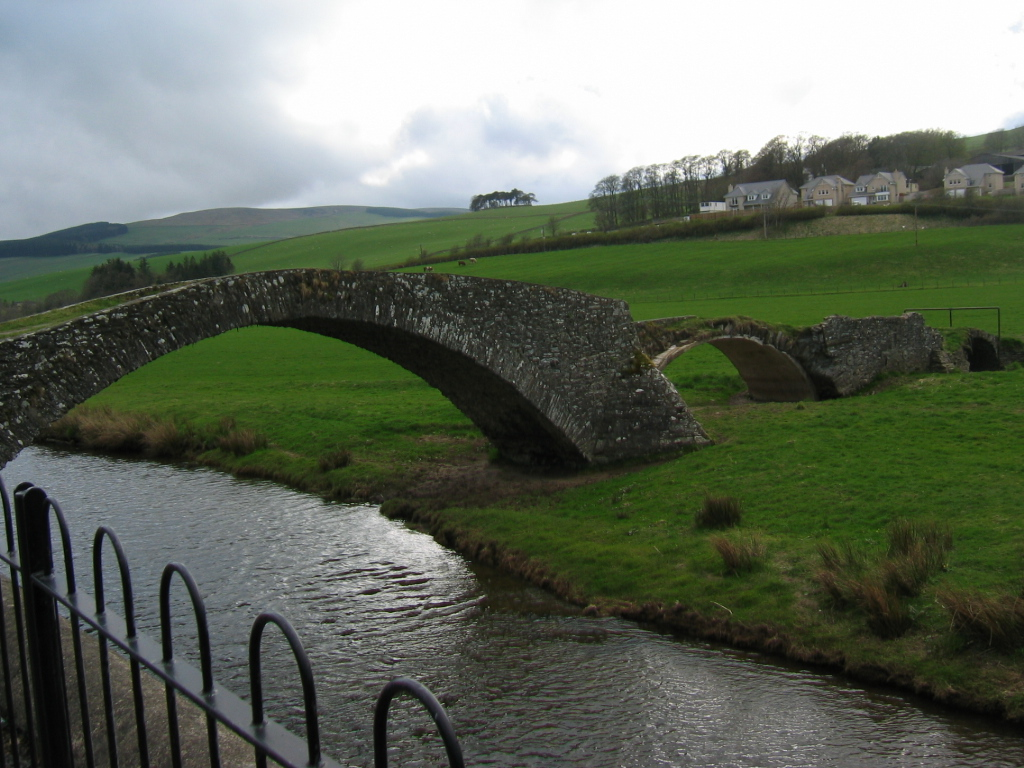
Bridge over Gala Water at Stow
