= Statue of William Wallace, Bemersyde =

Monument in the Scottish Borders

Coordinates: 55.5862°N 2.6495°W

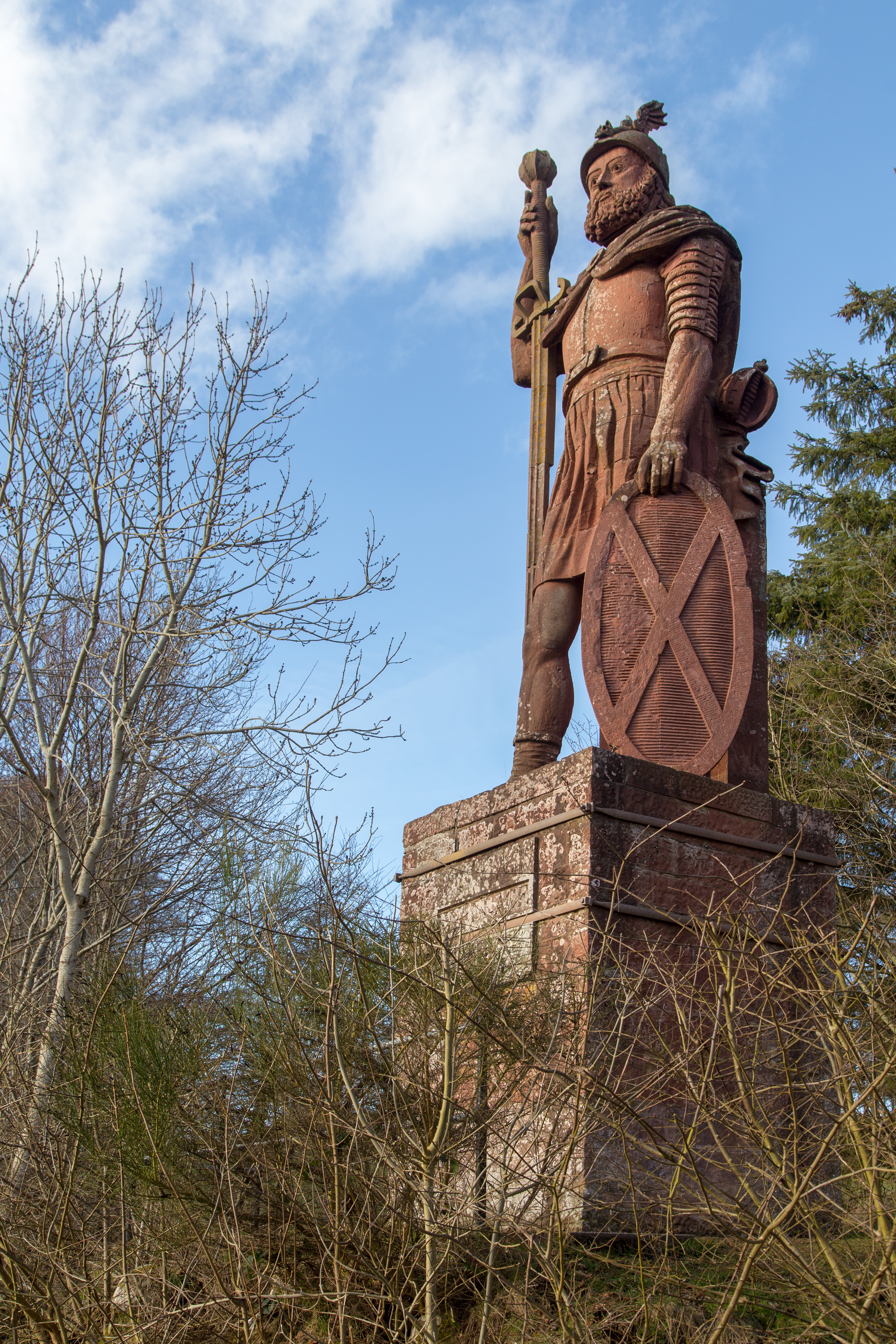
William Wallace statue near Bemersyde House, Scottish Borders

The William Wallace Statue near the grounds of the Bemersyde estate, near Melrose in the Scottish Borders is a statue commemorating William Wallace. It was commissioned by David Steuart Erskine, 11th Earl of Buchan, and it is protected as a category B listed building.

The statue was made of red sandstone by John Smith of Darnick and was erected in 1814. It stands 31 feet (9.4 m) high and depicts Wallace looking over the River Tweed. In 1991, the William Wallace Trust, which owns the statue and surrounding land and car park raised funds for a renovation which was carried out by Bob Heath and Graciella Glenn Ainsworth.

At Wallace's feet reads the inscription:

Erected by David Stuart
Erskine, Earl of Buchan
WALLACE
GREAT PATRIOT HERO!
ILL REQUITED CHIEF!
MDCCCXIV

Below the statue of Wallace, as part of the same construction by John Smith is a smaller statue of a funeral style urn inscribed as follows:

Sacred to the memory of Wallace

The peerless Knight of Ellerslie [sic]
Who wav'd on Ayr's Romantic shore
The beamy torch of Liberty
And roaming round from Sea to Sea
From Glade obscure of gloomy Rock
His bold companions call'd to free
The Realm from Edward's Iron Yoke.

Close by are Brotherstone Hill, Dryburgh Abbey, the Leaderfoot Viaduct, Newtown St. Boswells, Scott's View, and the Smailholm Tower.

== See also ==
- Wallace Monument
- William Wallace Statue, Aberdeen
- List of places in the Scottish Borders
- List of places in Scotland
