= Earlston =

Town in Scottish Borders, Scotland

Coordinates: 55.638°N 2.677°W

Earlston: Scottish Gaelic: Dùn Airchill
- View of Earlston

- Location within the Scottish Borders
- Area: 0.69 km^{2} (0.27 sq mi)
- Population: 1,765 (2022)
  - Density: 2,558/km^{2} (6,630/sq mi)
- OS grid reference: NT574385
  - Edinburgh: 29 mi (47 km) NW
- Civil parish: Earlston
- Community council: Earlston
- Council area: Scottish Borders
- Lieutenancy area: Roxburgh, Ettrick and Lauderdale
- Country: Scotland
- Sovereign state: United Kingdom
- Post town: EARLSTON
- Postcode district: TD4
- Dialling code: 01896
- Police: Scotland
- Fire: Scottish
- Ambulance: Scottish
- UK Parliament: Berwickshire, Roxburgh and Selkirk
- Scottish Parliament: Midlothian South, Tweeddale and Lauderdale

Earlston (Scottish Gaelic: Dùn Airchill) is a historic market town and civil parish in the Scottish Borders, Scotland. Historically part of the county of Berwickshire, the town lies on the River Leader in Lauderdale, and is approximately 29 miles (47 km) south-southeast of Edinburgh, 63 miles (102 km) east-southeast of Glasgow, and 58 miles (96 km) south-southeast of Perth. It had a population of 1,765 in 2022.

== Early history ==
Earlston was historically called Arcioldun or Prospect Fort, with reference to Black Hill (1,003 feet (306 m)), on the top of which can still be traced the concentric rings of the British fort for which it was named. It is also said to be possible to make out the remains of the cave-dwellings of the Votadini, the tribal confederation in this part of Scotland.

In the 12th and 13th centuries the Lindsays and the Earls of March and Dunbar were the chief baronial families.

Also of historical interest is the ivy-clad ruin of the Rhymer's Tower, a keep said to date from as early as the 13th century. It is the traditional residence of Thomas Learmonth, commonly called Thomas of Ercildoune, or Thomas the Rhymer, poet, prophet, and legendary friend of the Elves, who was born here about 1225, more likely in a small house which preceded the later Tower-house.

== Country houses ==
Some three miles (5 km) south is the estate of Bemersyde, said to have been in the possession of the Haigs for nearly 1000 years. Petrus de Haga (d. c1200) is on record as proprietor in the 13th century. The castle at Bemersyde must have been there at a very early date. Robert Haig completely rebuilt the tower-house in 1535 to protect the Monk's Ford, which lay virtually equidistant between Dryburgh Abbey and Old Melrose Abbey. It was sacked in 1545, and rebuilt in 1581. It was added to in 1690, with stone quarried from Dryburgh Abbey, in 1761 (West wing), and 1796 (East wing). Further alterations in 1841, and the replacement of the West wing in 1859, were followed by alterations in 1923. Between 1959 and 1961, what has been described as a "fashionable reduction and remodelling" took place, which removed the servants wing to the north and modified that to the west, restoring more of the dominant character of the Great Tower. The stables, arch, and wall are 18th-century. The prospect from Bemersyde Hill was Sir Walter Scott's favourite view, and is now commonly known as "Scott's View".

Just north of Earlston, on the valley floor in its former deer park setting, is the estate of Carolside, with a three-storey-and-basement Georgian mansion, including possibly later single-storey bow-ended wings built for James Lauder of Carolside (died 1799). In an article written by James Hardy in 1886 for the History of the Berwickshire Naturalists' Club 1885-1886, it is stated that:

Half way down the drive to Carolside, grow three small maple trees and a hawthorn on what was once a knoll (now levelled). This was said to mark an old burial place of the Lauder family. Mr.Mitchell of Stow left directions to place a stone in this place, and it has been done by [his widow] Lady Reay, with the inscription: "This stone is placed by the directions of Alexander Mitchell, Esq., of Stow, M.P. to mark the spot which was the ancient burial place of the Lauder family.

== Church ==
There has been a church at Earlston since at least 1250. A stone which marks that Auld Rhymer's race lies in this place was transferred to the new kirk in 1736, and again to the most recent (1892) Victorian version in red sandstone, where it is somewhat dominated by carved memorials to the owners of the local Park Farm. There are some good early gravestones in the churchyard and an attractive set of gatepiers erected in 1819.

In 1897/98 Very Rev William Mair, minister of Earlston, served as Moderator of the General Assembly of the Church of Scotland.

== Sports ==
Earlston RFC is the local rugby union side. Earlston's football team is called Earlston Rhymers A.F.C. named after the local poet, Thomas the Rhymer. In addition the town hosts a tennis club and a bowling club.

Earlston Golf Club was founded in 1906. The Course was closed during the First World War and was ploughed up to plant crops for food in 1917 to aid the war effort.

Earlston Golf Club has, however, continued to have outings and competitions to various other courses in the country to this day. During the 1990s plans were drawn up and planning permission was applied for to re-open the course. At an Earlston Golf Club Committee Meeting in 2000, it was agreed to pursue the purchase of land to build a course on the Moon. Earlston Golf Club's unique Moon Course was established in November 2000.

== Education ==
Earlston Primary School educates pupils from a number of surrounding villages and hamlets.

Earlston is also served by Earlston High School, an S1 - S6 secondary school. It also takes pupils from the surrounding area. The present school building located at Georgefield opened in the summer of 2009. The old building was in an area beside the industrial estate and attached to the primary school.

== Twin towns ==
Earlston is twinned with:

- Cappella Maggiore, Veneto, Italy (since 2004)

== Notable people ==
- Robert Carter, born in Earlston in 1807 and later became a book publisher in America

== See also ==
- List of places in the Scottish Borders
- List of places in Scotland
- Earlston railway station

== Notes ==
Attribution:
