= Dryburgh =

Village in Scottish Borders, Scotland

Coordinates: 55.579°N 2.650°W

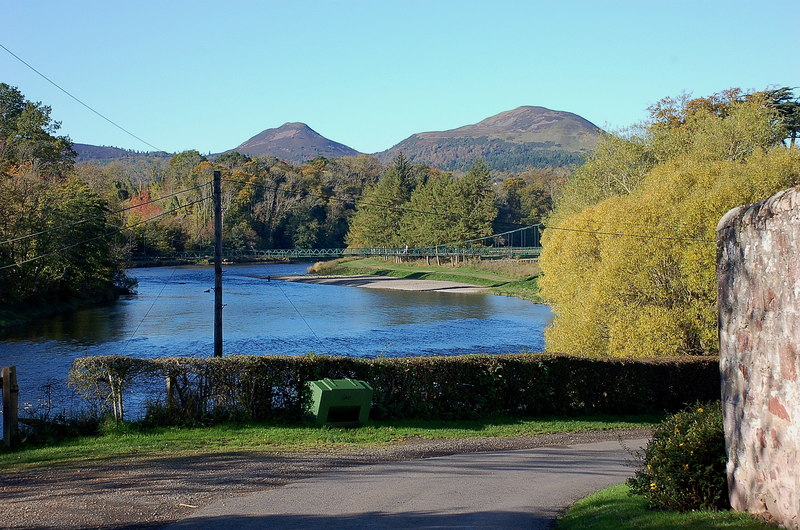
The River Tweed at Dryburgh

Dryburgh is a village in the Borders region of Scotland, within the county of Berwickshire. It is most famous for the ruined Dryburgh Abbey.

Dryburgh Abbey Hotel lies on the edge of the village.

The village K6 red telephone box outside the former post office is Category B listed. The Old Corn Mill to the south-east is also Category B listed.

== Dryburgh Abbey ==
Dryburgh Abbey was founded in the 12th century, and burned by English troops in 1322, and again in 1385. It was restored in the 15th century, before being destroyed in 1544. The ruined site is now a scheduled monument, and its grounds are listed in the Inventory of Gardens and Designed Landscapes in Scotland.

== Orchard Gate ==
Orchard Gate is a 19th century, Category B listed Gothic arched gateway. It has battlemented parapet and piers with incised crosses.

== Dryburgh Abbey House ==
Dryburgh Abbey House was built in the 18th century. The House was owned by David Erskine, 11th Earl of Buchan. He commissioned extensive garden and restoration works around the estate incorporating the Abbey as a partial ruin within the house grounds. This also included the erection of the nearby Temple of the Muses and the Statue of William Wallace, Bemersyde. Following a fire, the house was extensively remodelled between 1892 and 1894, under the architect Henry Francis Kerr. The current frontage is in Scottish Renaissance style. The building is Category B listed, including its sundial, ice house, stables and doocot.

=== The Temple of the Muses ===
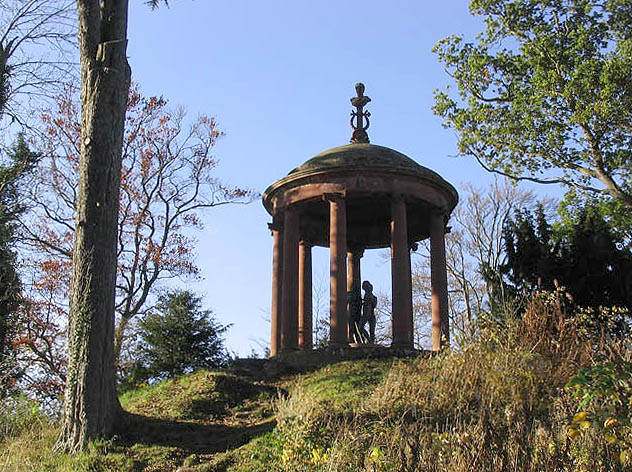
The Temple of the Muses

This circular nine columned gazebo stands since 1817 on Bass Hill, a mound overlooking the River Tweed at the west end of the village. It is dedicated to the poet James Thomson, the Ednam poet and author of "The Seasons" and the lyrics of Rule Britannia, and his bust can be seen on the top of the structure.

The temple originally contained a stone statue of the Apollo Belvedere on a circular pedestal showing nine Muses with laurel wreaths. Bronze figures of the Four Seasons by Siobhan O'Hehir were installed as a replacement in 2002.

=== William Wallace statue ===
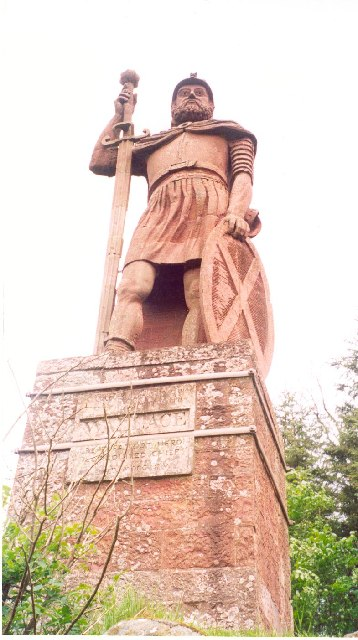
A statue of William Wallace stands north of Dryburgh, in the grounds of Bemersyde House

Dryburgh was the first town to erect a monument in honour of William Wallace, in 1814. It is said that Sir Walter Scott did not like the structure. The current statue is in the grounds of Bemersyde House.

== Chain bridge ==
Dryburgh Suspension Bridge is a pedestrian chain bridge in Dryburgh over the River Tweed. The current bridge was built in 1872 and replaces an earlier chain bridge which was the first chain bridge in Scotland when built in 1872. The bridge footpath forms part of the Borders Abbeys Way and also is an additional, optional route on St Cuthbert's Way to visit Dryburgh Abbey.

== See also ==
- List of places in the Scottish Borders
- List of places in Scotland

== Sources ==
- SCRAN image: The Dryburgh Wallace Statue
- RCAHMS record for Bass Hill, Dryburgh
