= Bemersyde House =

Historic house in Roxburghshire, Scotland

Coordinates: 55.59161°N 2.64892°W

Designations

Inventory of Gardens and Designed Landscapes in Scotland
- Official name: Bemersyde
- Designated: 1 July 1987
- Reference no.: GDL00055

Bemersyde House is a historic house in Roxburghshire, Scotland.

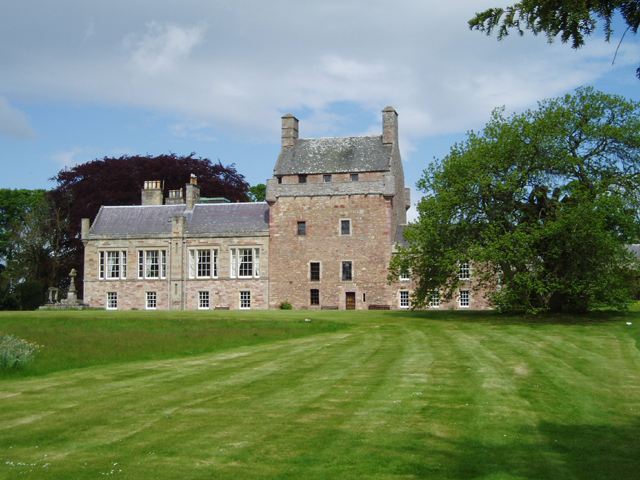
Bemersyde House

The nearest towns are Newtown St. Boswells, Melrose, and Dryburgh. The William Wallace Statue, Bemersyde is on the Bemersyde Estate.

== History ==
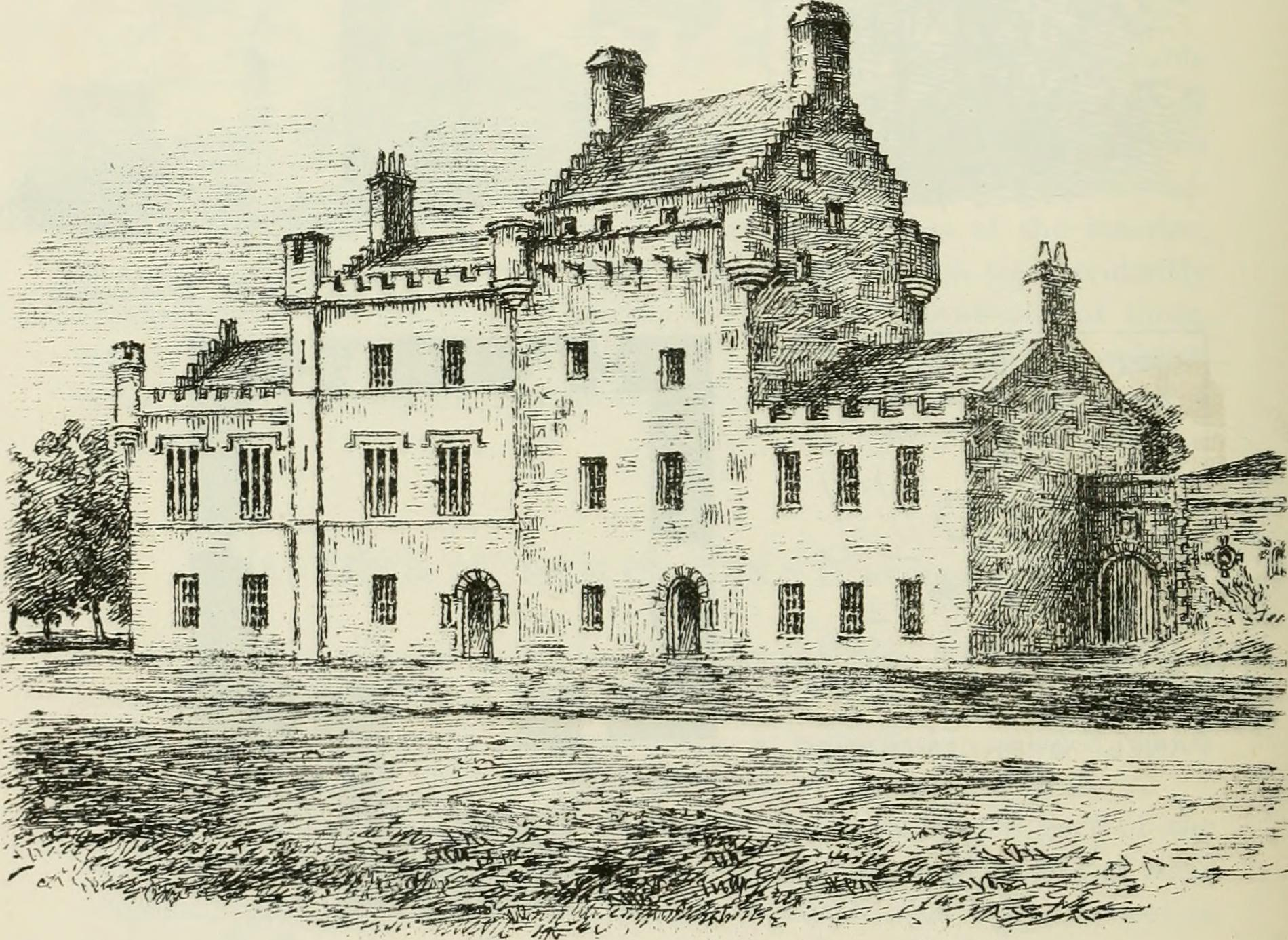
The castle before 1887

Dating back to the 16th century as a peel tower, Bemersyde was bought by the British Government in 1921 and presented to Field-Marshal The 1st Earl Haig, the British Commander in World War I. The House is the seat of the chief of Clan Haig, currently Alexander Douglas Derrick Haig, 3rd Earl Haig. The family motto of the Earls Haig is "Tyde what may", which refers to a 13th-century poem by Thomas the Rhymer which predicted that there would always be a Haig in Bemersyde:

'Tyde what may betyde
Haig shall be Haig of Bemersyde'.

== See also ==
- Bemersyde, Bemersyde Moss
- List of places in the Scottish Borders
- List of places in Scotland
