= Melrose, Scottish Borders =

Town in Scottish Borders, Scotland

Coordinates: 55.598°N 2.731°W

Melrose: Scottish Gaelic: Maolros; Scots: Melrose
- Market Square

- Location within the Scottish Borders
- Population: 2,473 (2022)
- OS grid reference: NT5434
- Council area: Scottish Borders
- Lieutenancy area: Roxburgh, Ettrick and Lauderdale
- Country: Scotland
- Sovereign state: United Kingdom
- Post town: MELROSE
- Postcode district: TD6
- Dialling code: 01896
- Police: Scotland
- Fire: Scottish
- Ambulance: Scottish
- UK Parliament: Berwickshire, Roxburgh and Selkirk
- Scottish Parliament: Midlothian South, Tweeddale and Lauderdale

Melrose (Scottish Gaelic: Maolros, "bald moor") is a historic market town and civil parish in the Scottish Borders, Scotland. Historically part of the historic county of Roxburghshire, it lies near the River Tweed, approximately 30 miles (48 km) southeast of Edinburgh, 62 miles (100 km) east-southeast of Glasgow, 63 miles (101 km) southeast of Perth, and 3 miles (5 km) west-northwest of Galashiels. It had a population of 2,473 in 2022.

Melrose is within the Eildon committee area of Scottish Borders Council. It is surrounded by the small villages of Darnick, Gattonside, Newstead, Lilliesleaf and Bowden.

== History ==
The original Melrose was Mailros, meaning "the bare peninsula" in Old Welsh or Brythonic. This referred to a neck of land by the River Tweed several miles east of the present town, where in the 6th century a monastery was founded associated with St Cuthbert. It was recorded by Bede, and also in the Anglo-Saxon Chronicle with the name Magilros. This monastery and settlement, later known as "Old Melrose", were long abandoned by the 12th century.

King David I of Scotland took the throne in 1124, and sought to create a new Cistercian monastery at the site; however the monks preferred a site further west called "Fordel". In 1136, he founded the new monastery at the new site; the monks came from Rievaulx Abbey in Yorkshire, and the settlement that developed around the new monastery became the present town of Melrose.

Mel & Rose symbols in stonework at Abbey

So the monastery now known as Melrose Abbey was founded there in 1136, and the town of Melrose grew up on its present site around it.

In the late Middle Ages, its name was represented by a mell (a mason's hammer) and a rose (for the Virgin Mary, to whom all Cistercian abbeys were dedicated). Following the Reformation, the abbey ceased to function as a monastery, although monks remained there for several decades; the last monk, John Watson, died around 1590. Several Scottish nobles are buried there, and a casket has been found which is believed to contain the heart of King Robert the Bruce. The casket has been re-buried in the Abbey. The Abbey ruins are cared for by Historic Environment Scotland (open all year; entrance charge).

James IV came to Melrose for Christmas in 1496. He rewarded "gysaris" or guisers who performed at Melrose on 27 December 1496.

Nearby is the Roman fort of Trimontium, Abbotsford House (the home of Sir Walter Scott), and Dryburgh Abbey (where he was buried in 1832). The Corn Exchange, which was designed by David Cousin, was completed in 1863.

The war memorial, erected in 1920, was designed by Sir Robert Lorimer.

The railway reached Melrose in 1849, when the North British Railway opened a station, which subsequently formed part of the route between Edinburgh and Carlisle. The station remained in passenger use until the closure of the line in 1969; the former station building and part of the platform survive.

== Sport ==
Melrose is the birthplace of Rugby Sevens and also has a rugby union team, Melrose RFC. Every year on the second Saturday in April the famous Melrose Sevens are held at the Greenyards and is the biggest annual sporting event held in the town. Rugby union has historically been the most popular sport in Melrose.

Melrose Golf Club is a nine-hole golf course situated on the edge of the town at the foot of the Eildon Hills.

Melrose Cricket Club is situated next to Borders General Hospital at Huntlyburn.

Melrose Football Club SCIO, founded in 1995, is the grassroot junior football club that serves the town and local area. Junior boys teams play with the Scottish Borders Junior Football Association. Youth Boys teams play with the South East Region Youth Football Association. Girls teams, for example Melrose FC, are affiliated to Scottish Women's Football and play in leagues across the Borders and Lothians.

== Events ==
Every June, the week-long Melrose Festival takes place. This involves appointing a Melrosian who has lived in the town for most of his life; and a queen and her court are appointed from the local primary school, Melrose Primary School (previously named Melrose Grammar School).

Melrose is now host to the annual Borders Book Festival which also takes place during June. The 2005 festival hosted guests including Michael Palin and Germaine Greer; Ian Rankin and Rory Bremner appeared in 2006.

Melrose hosts the annual Eildon Three Hill Race, attracting many runners, and the Melrose Pipe Band Championships, attracting pipers from all over the world.

Melrose is twinned with the town of Teba in southern Spain where Douglas Day is celebrated annually.

== Notable people ==
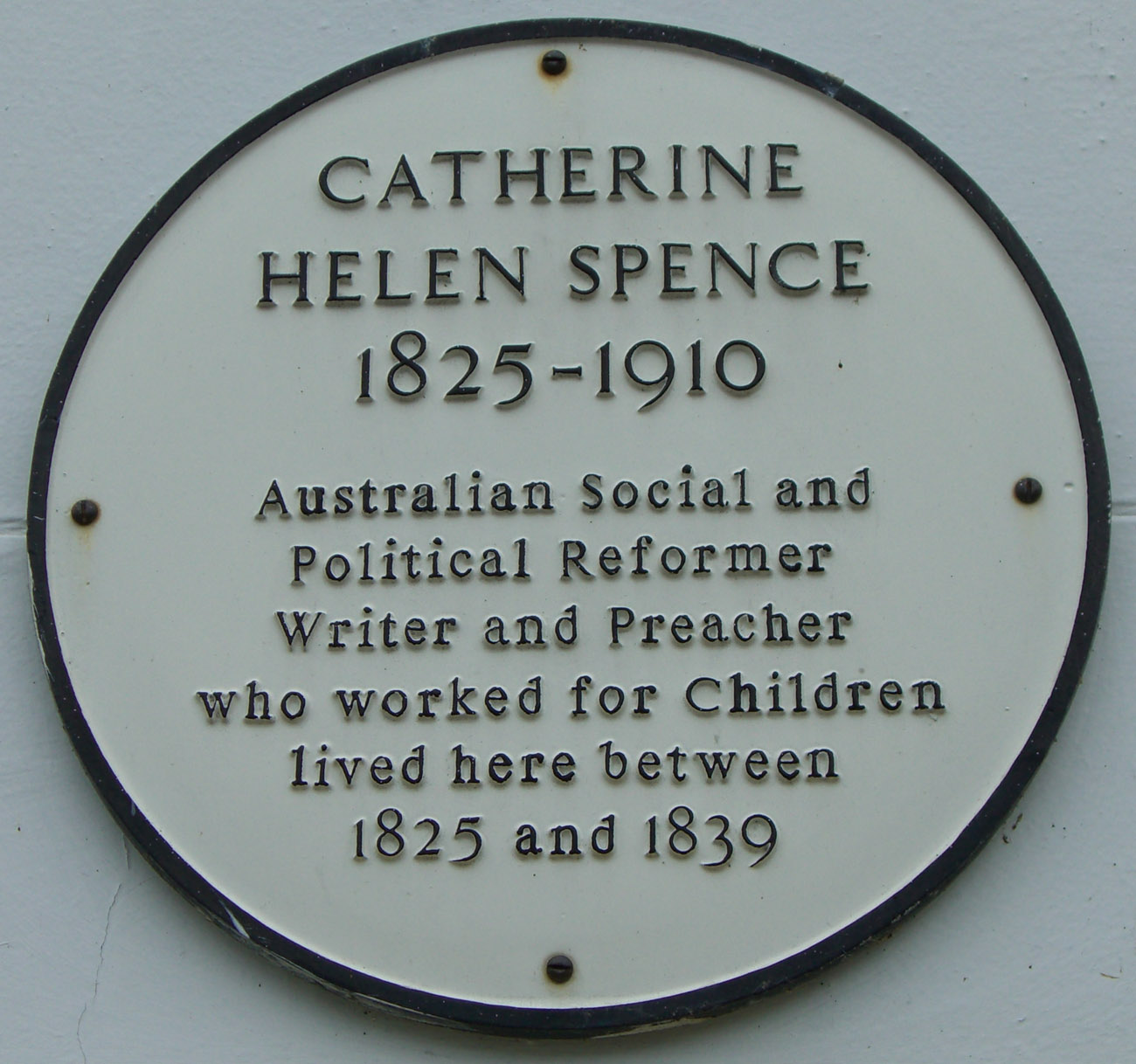
A wall plaque at the Townhouse Hotel in Melrose, Scotland. Spence lived the first 14 years of her life in a building which is now part of the hotel.

- King Arthur, supposedly buried in the Eildon Hills, which overlook the town
- James Blair (1828–1905), recipient of the Victoria Cross
- Craig Chalmers (born 1968), rugby union footballer, capped 60 times for Scotland
- Richard Curle (1883–1968), author, critic and journalist
- Sir Adam Ferguson (1770–1854), army officer and Deputy Keeper of the Scottish Regalia lived at Huntlyburn House, now a wing of the Hospital.
- Rosie Frew, Bowden and Melrose Parish Minister, Church of Scotland General Assembly Moderator for 2025-26
- Ned Haig (1858–1939), butcher and rugby union footballer who founded rugby sevens and the Melrose Sevens
- Stuart Hogg (born 1992), rugby union footballer, captain of Scotland
- John Robertson Henderson (1863–1925), zoologist
- William Kerr (1831–1919), recipient of the Victoria Cross
- Keith Robertson (born 1954), rugby union footballer
- Mark Robertson (born 1984), son of Keith Robertson; rugby union sevens, 2016 Olympic silver medalist
- Sarah Robertson (born 1993), field hockey player
- Sir Walter Scott (1771–1832), his home Abbotsford House lies a few miles west of the town
- Catherine Helen Spence (1825–1910), Australian author, teacher, journalist, politician and suffragette; born in Melrose, and left for Australia aged fourteen
- Jim Telfer (born 1940), rugby union footballer and coach

== Twinning ==
Melrose is twinned with:

- Teba, Málaga, Spain

Teba is where Douglas Day is celebrated annually in memory of the Battle of Teba.

== Gallery ==
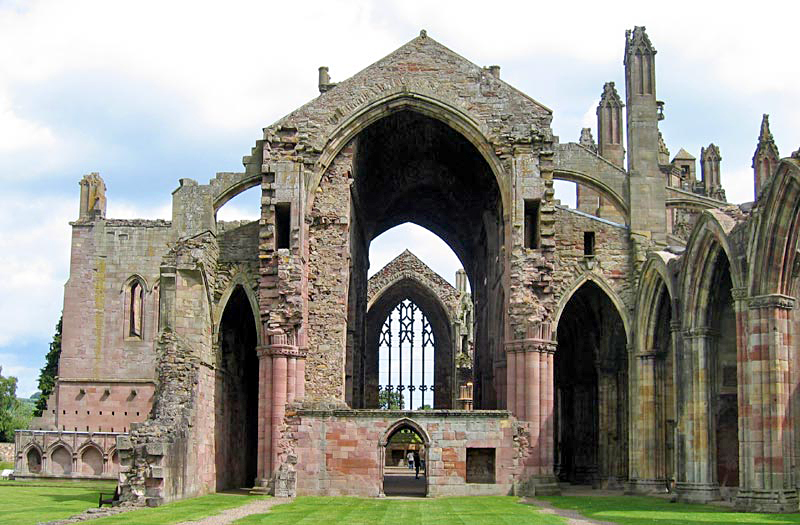
Melrose Abbey

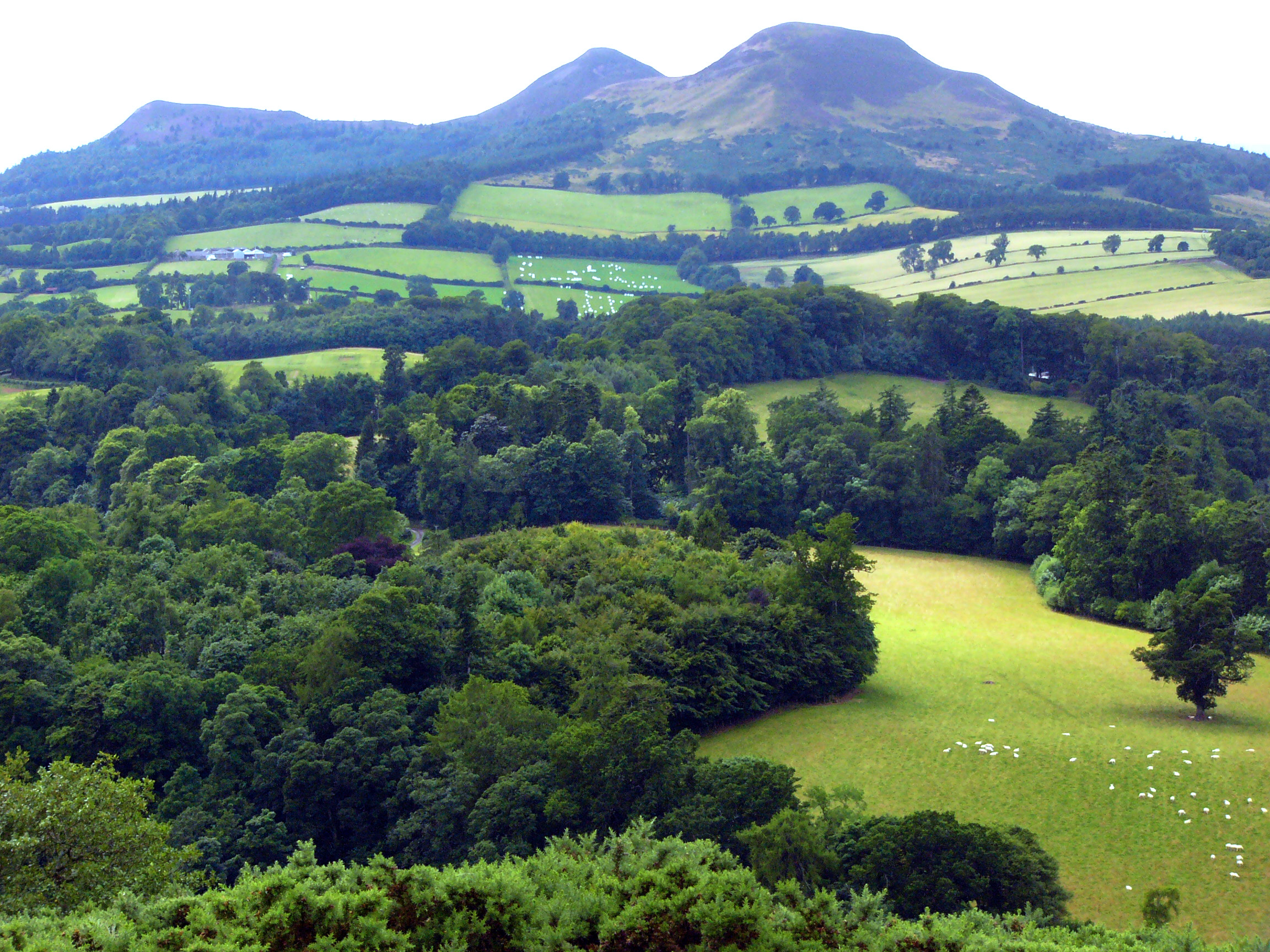
Eildon Hills

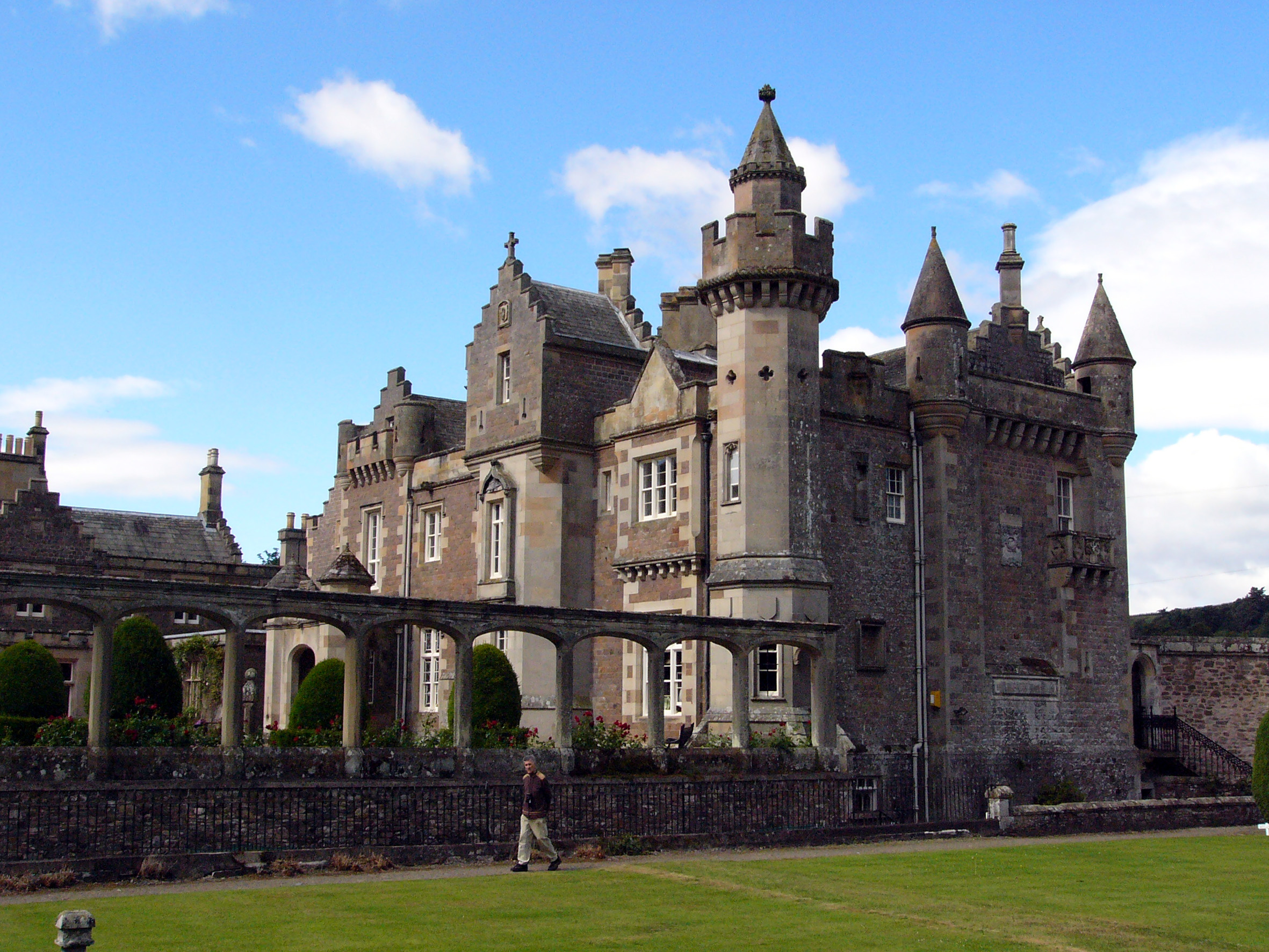
Abbotsford

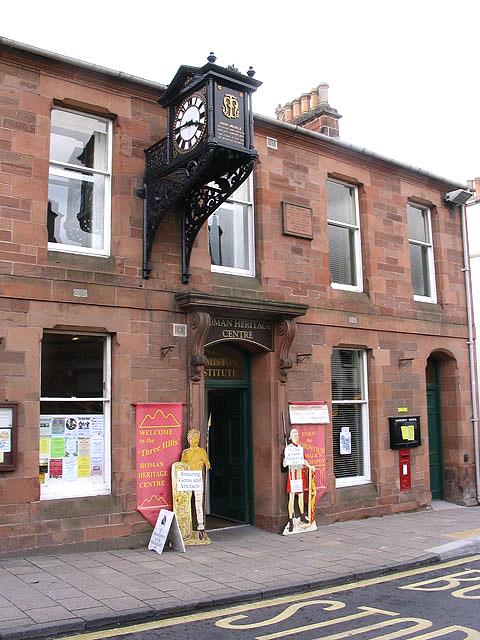
The Roman Heritage Centre

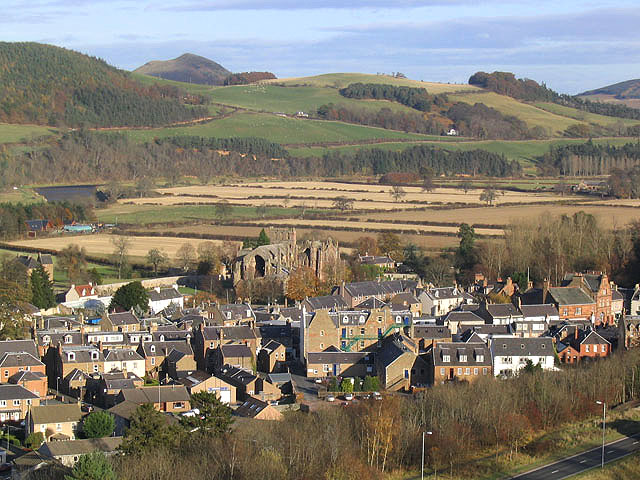
View of Melrose from Quarry Hill

== See also ==
- Borders General Hospital
- Buglass, Scottish surname from old lands of Booklawes near Melrose
- Harmony Garden, a National Trust for Scotland garden in Melrose
- Priorwood Garden, also NTS
- List of places in the Scottish Borders
- List of places in Scotland
