= Dryburgh (disambiguation) =

Dryburgh is a village in the Scottish Borders region of Scotland.

Dryburgh may also refer to:

== Places ==
- Dryburgh (Dundee district), Scotland
- Dryburgh Abbey, near Dryburgh on the River Tweed in the Scottish Borders
- Dryburgh Abbey Hotel, a baronial country house hotel, located on the banks of the River Tweed

== People ==
- Dryburgh (surname)
- Abbot of Dryburgh (later, Commendator of Dryburgh)
- Adam of Dryburgh (c. 1140–1212), Anglo-Scottish theologian, writer and Premonstratensian

== Other ==
- Dave Dryburgh Memorial Trophy, Canadian Football League
