= James Ogilvie (bishop) =

Scottish prelate

James Ogilvie (died 1518) was a late medieval Scottish prelate who served as Bishop of Aberdeen. After the death of William Elphinstone (died 24 October 1514), the bishopric of Aberdeen became vacant. Ogilvie was nominated for the vacancy by John Stewart, Duke of Albany. At Rome however, Pope Leo X provided Robert Forman to the vacant see, while the canons of Aberdeen elect Alexander Gordon, allegedly under pressure from the latter's cousin Alexander Gordon, 3rd Earl of Huntly. It was because of this that Ogilvie resigned his rights to this bishopric, and in compensation, became Commendator-Abbot of Dryburgh. During the early days of his commendatorship, it was recorded that he was a canon of the diocese of Aberdeen and the parson of Kinkell, Aberdeenshire. Ogilvie held the commendatorship for merely three years, dying on 30 May 1518.

Religious titles
Preceded by Andrew Forman	Commendator of Dryburgh; 1515–1518	Succeeded by David Hamilton
