= Alexander Gordon (bishop of Aberdeen) =

Scottish churchman

Alexander Gordon (died 1518) was a late medieval Scottish churchman. He was member of the kindred of the Earl of Huntly, being cousin to the reigning earl. He was the third son of James Gordon, Laird of Haddo.

== Career ==
From at least 1504, probably earlier, until 1516, he was Precentor (chanter) of the diocese of Moray.

From 1507 until he became Bishop of Aberdeen in 1514 he was the Keeper of the Privy Seal of Scotland.

After the death of William Elphinstone (d. 24 October 1514), the canons of Aberdeen prepared to elect a successor. According to later tradition, Alexander Gordon, 3rd Earl of Huntly, arrived and pressured the canons to elect his own cousin, the Precentor of Moray.

Meanwhile, at Rome Pope Leo X had provided Robert Forman, dean of Glasgow, to the vacant see, while at the same time the Duke of Albany had nominated one James Ogilvie, who quickly became Abbot of Dryburgh instead. Forman was persuaded by his brother Andrew Forman, Archbishop of St Andrews, to yield his claim to Gordon upon the promise of the next vacancy.

== Death ==
He died on 30 June 1518. It is possible that he eventually received the ritual of consecration, though it is not very likely, although he was clearly ruling bishop for 3 years or over.

== Sources ==
- Dowden, John, The Bishops of Scotland, ed. J. Maitland Thomson, (Glasgow, 1912)
- Innes, Cosmo, Registrum Episcopatus Aberdonensis: Ecclesie Cathedralis Aberdonensis Regesta Que Extant in Unum Collecta, Vol. 1, (Edinburgh, 1845)
- Keith, Robert, An Historical Catalogue of the Scottish Bishops: Down to the Year 1688, (London, 1924)
- Watt, D.E.R., Fasti Ecclesiae Scoticanae Medii Aevi ad annum 1638, 2nd Draft, (St Andrews, 1969)

Political offices
Preceded by William Elphinstone; Bishop of Aberdeen	Keeper of the Privy Seal of Scotland; 1507–1514	Succeeded by David, Abbot of Arbroath
Religious titles
Preceded by Adam Gordon	Precentor of Moray x 1504–1516	Succeeded by Alexander Lyon
Preceded by William Elphinstone	Bishop of Aberdeen x 1515–1518	Succeeded by Gavin Dunbar
