= Robert Forman =

Scottish churchman

Robert Forman (died 1530) was a late medieval Scottish churchman. He was the son of one Janet Blackadder and her husband, a Berwickshire landowner named Nicholas Forman of Hatton. Sometime before 11 February 1500, he was made Precentor of Glasgow. He was Dean of Glasgow from 1505, a position he would hold until his death. Between 1506 and 1511 he was also in possession of the Chancellorship of the diocese of Moray.

After the death of William Elphinstone (d. 24 October 1514), the bishopric of Aberdeen became vacant. At Rome Pope Leo X provided Forman to the vacant see. However, the canons of Aberdeen prepared to elect a successor. According to John Spottiswoode, Alexander Gordon, 3rd Earl of Huntly, pressured the canons to elect his own cousin, also Alexander Gordon, a man who was at that time the Precentor of Moray. Forman was persuaded by his brother Andrew Forman, Archbishop of St Andrews, to yield his claim to Gordon upon the promise of the next vacancy.

He never, however, obtained any other bishopric. He died as Dean of Glasgow on 19 November 1530.

== Notes ==
Religious titles
Preceded by Richaed Muirhead	Dean of Glasgow x 1505–1530	Succeeded by William Stewart
Preceded by William Elphinstone	Bishop of Aberdeen elect x 1515–1515 x 1516	Succeeded by Alexander Gordon
