= David Hamilton (bishop) =

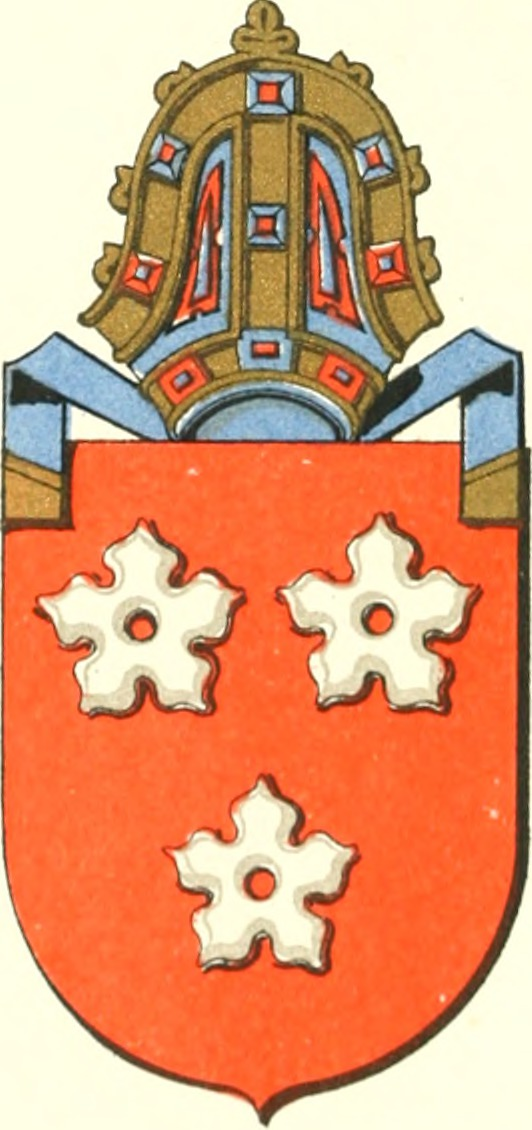
Coat of arms of David Hamilton.

David Hamilton, Bishop of Argyll and Abbot of Dryburgh (died 1523) was a late medieval Scottish prelate. He was an illegitimate son of James Hamilton, 1st Lord Hamilton, and brother of James Hamilton, 1st Earl of Arran.

He studied at the University of Glasgow and graduated in arts in 1492 and later studied in Paris. He was given the bishopric in 1497. He was witness to royal charters and served on royal commissions and in the exchequer in early 16th century. Between 1505 and 1507, he acted in Kintyre on royal business, making rentals of lands. He built Saddell Castle between 1508 and 1512. He died in 1523.
