= Dryburgh Abbey =

Former monastery in Scottish Borders

Coordinates: 55°34′37.5″N 2°38′58″W

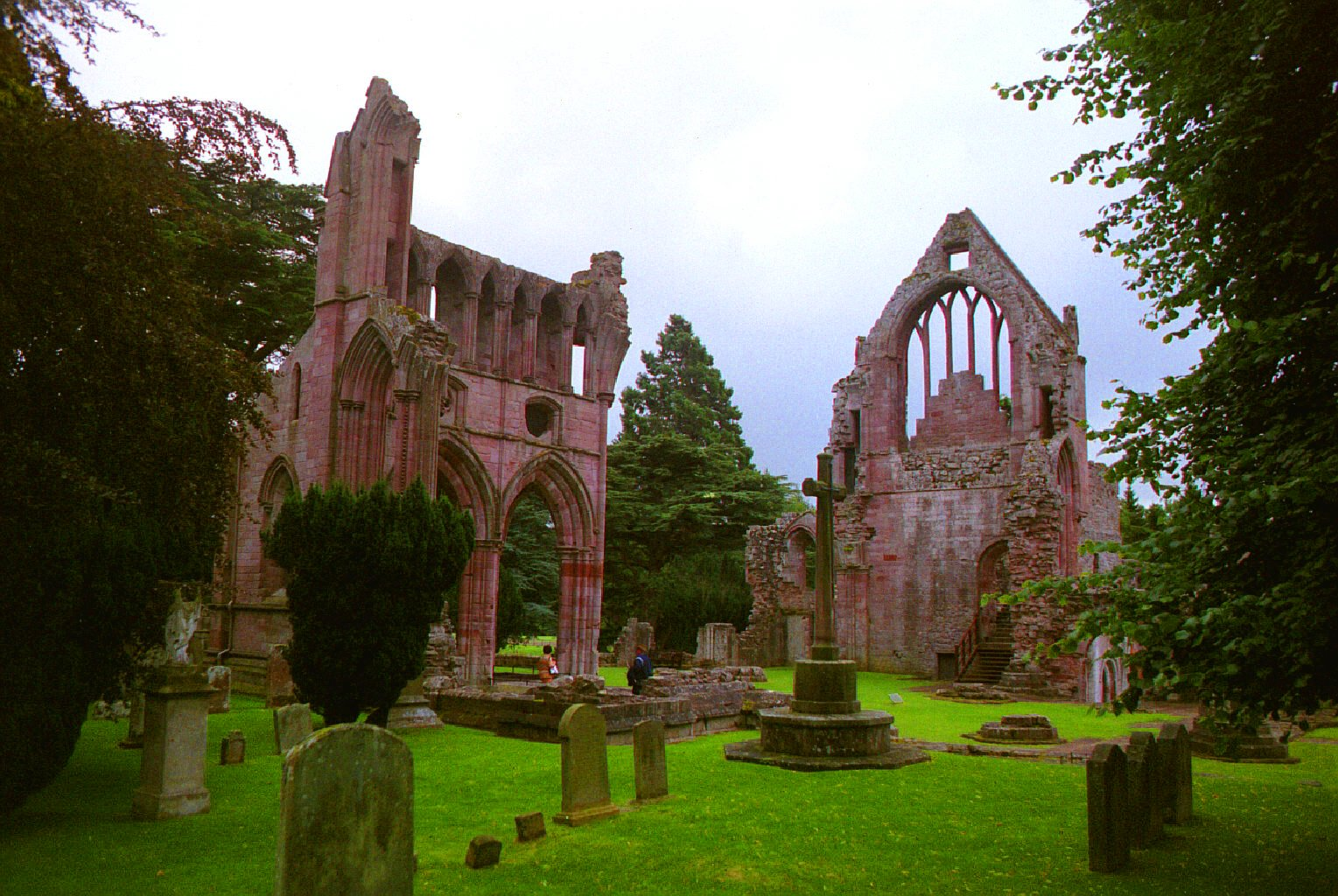
- Interactive map of Dryburgh Abbey

Monastery information
- Order: Premonstratensian
- Established: 1150
- Disestablished: bet. 1581 and 1600
- Mother house: Alnwick Abbey
- Diocese: Diocese of St. Andrews

People
- Founder: Hugh de Morville
- Important associated figures: Adam of Dryburgh, Andrew Forman

Inventory of Gardens and Designed Landscapes in Scotland
- Official name: Dryburgh Abbey
- Designated: 30 June 2011
- Reference no.: GDL00145

Dryburgh Abbey, near Dryburgh on the banks of the River Tweed in the Scottish Borders, was nominally founded on 10 November (Martinmas) 1150 in an agreement between Hugh de Morville, Constable of Scotland, and the Premonstratensian canons regular from Alnwick Abbey in Northumberland. The canons, along with their first abbot, Roger, arrived on 13 December 1152.

It was burned by English troops in 1322, after which it was restored only to be burned again by Richard II in 1385, but it flourished in the fifteenth century. It was finally destroyed in 1544, briefly surviving until the Scottish Reformation, when it was given to the Earl of Mar by James VI of Scotland. It is now a designated scheduled monument, and the surrounding landscape is included in the Inventory of Gardens and Designed Landscapes in Scotland.

David Erskine, 11th Earl of Buchan bought the land in 1786. Sir Walter Scott and Douglas Haig are buried in its grounds. Their respective tomb and headstone, along with other memorials, are collectively designated a Category A listed building.

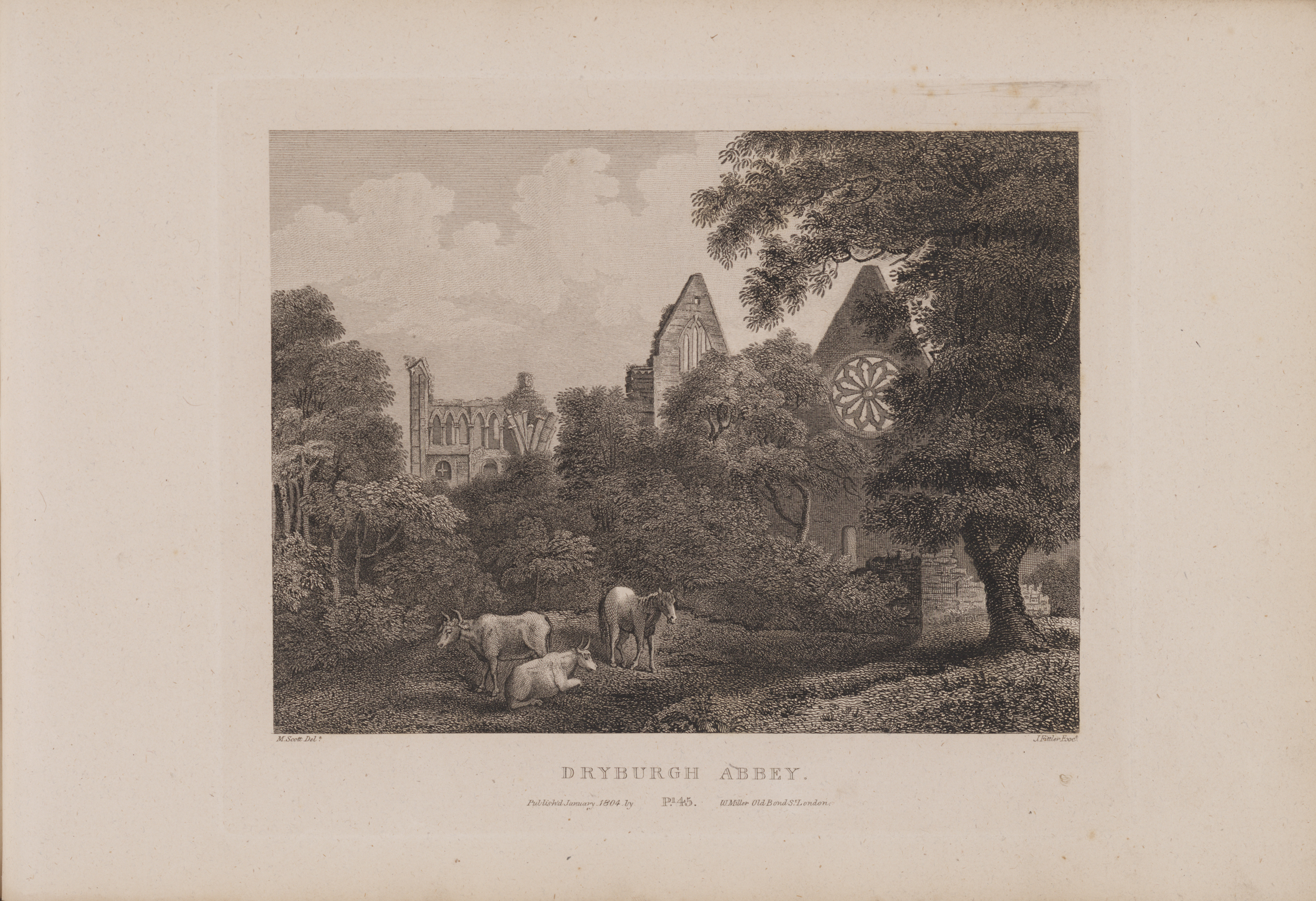
1804 engraving of Dryburgh Abbey by James Fittler in Scotia Depicta

== The Premonstratensian order ==
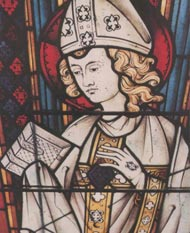
Saint Norbert of Xanten

The Premonstratensian order was founded by St Norbert of Xanten, who was first a canon at Xanten Cathedral. Unhappy with the way of life of his fellow canons, he left the Rhine lands for the diocese of Laon, in northern France, where the reforming Bishop Bartholomew was transforming his see into one that was more apostolic. Bartholomew persuaded Norbert to form a canonical order at Prémontré, in Aisne in 1120 and while the order was Augustinian in form, the canons wore the white habit and not the black. They followed an austere monastic life but had a duty to preach and to teach those outside of the monastery walls. The order spread rapidly across Europe with the Abbot of Prémontré becoming Abbot-General for all the daughter-houses. Even before the first Abbot-General, Hugh of Fosse, died, one hundred and twenty abbots attended the annual general chapter. The Premonstratensians adopted many of the methods of the Cistercians, including land management and the use of lay-brothers to undertake the labour-intensive work of the communes.

== Abbey endowments ==
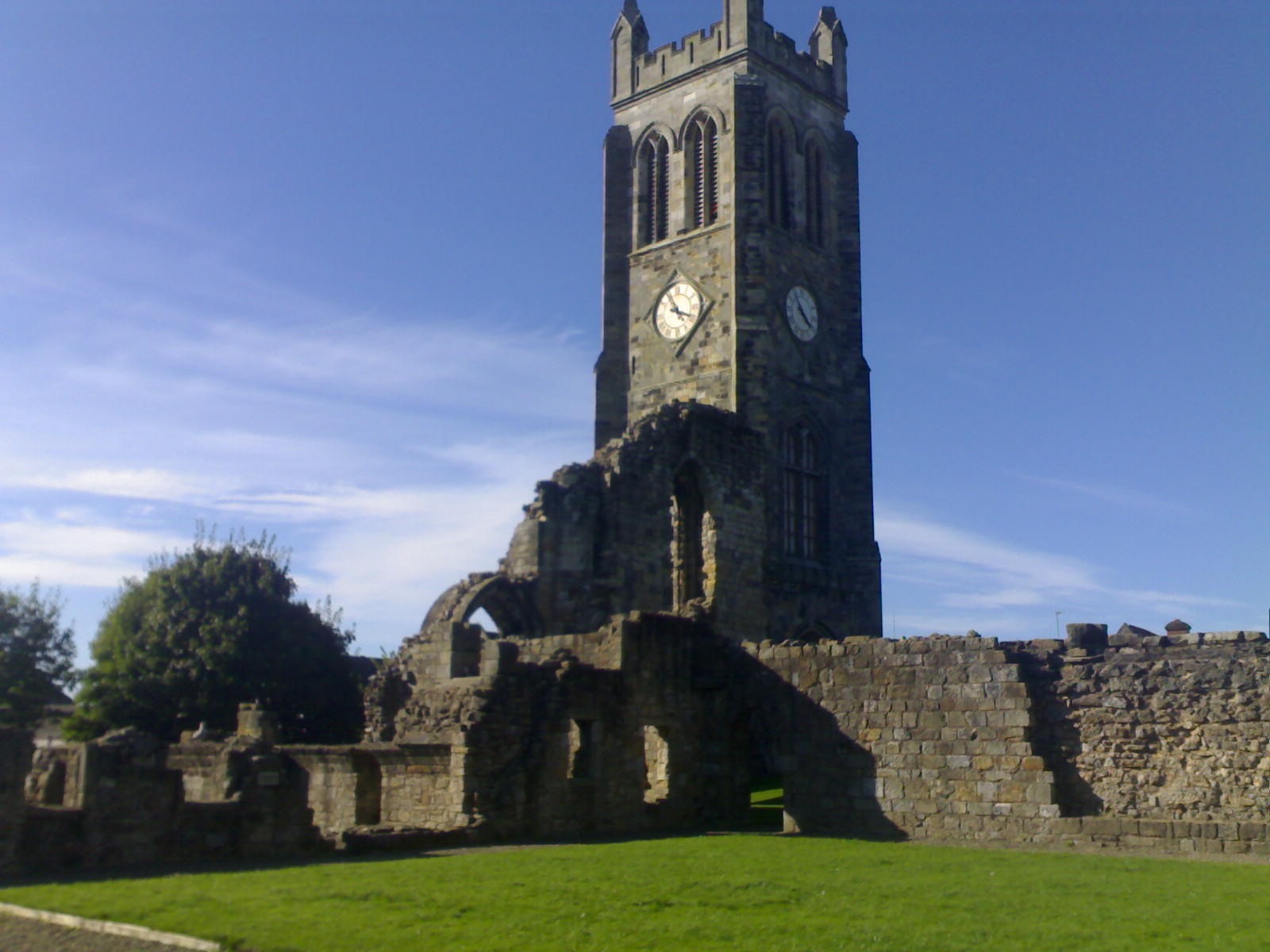
Kilwinning Abbey

Unlike the situation at nearby Melrose Abbey with its royal patronage, Hugh de Morville, although a very wealthy noble, could not endow Dryburgh on the same scale as that of a monarch. However, it seems that King David I of Scotland was not unsympathetic to the monastery; it is recorded in a charter that as well as confirming various donations from de Morville's wife, Beatrice de Beauchamp, the king allowed the abbey to take freely, timber from his forests for the building work. Hugh gave the lands of Dryburgh containing the forests, grasslands and accompanying waters; the fishings from Berwick; the churches with their lands at Mertoun and Channelkirk in his lordship of Lauderdale and Asby in Westmorland; and the earnings from the mills of Saltoun and Lauder. Beatrice gave the income from the church at Bozeat, Northamptonshire to the abbey as well as lands at Roxburgh that she bought solely for subsequent donation.

Hugh, in around 1162, like some other magnates of the period, turned his back on worldly affairs and entered the abbey-church, adopting the habit of the canons. He gave his elder son, Richard, his large Scottish estates, while his younger son, Hugh, received those in England. Hugh, the senior, died at Dryburgh Abbey that same year. In 1164, Dryburgh yielded Colmslie and adjacent woodland between the Leader and Gala Waters to Melrose Abbey.

Following Hugh's death, his son Richard continued as patron to the abbey. However, in c. 1170 he founded the hospital of St Leonard near his castle at Lauder and then, sometime between 1169 and 1187, the abbey of Kilwinning in the lordship of Cunningham. Although Kilwinning Abbey was built on a grand scale, it was inadequately provided for and so Richard ensured that some of the expense of its construction and upkeep was met from his holdings in Lauderdale; indeed a long-running argument broke out between Kilwinning and Dryburgh over the former's share of the tithes from the church of Lauder. Richard de Morville's establishment of this second monastery ensured that both establishments would remain in a state of relative poverty.

== Daughter houses ==
Despite underfunding, Dryburgh Abbey attracted a continuous flow of novices to bolster the number of canons, so much so that by the closing years of the 12th century the abbey was overcrowded, necessitating the establishment of colonies. John de Courcy, the earl of Ulster installed a colony at Carrickfergus. A second at Drumcross, but neither flourished. This is attributed more to the constant political convulsions throughout 13th-century Ulster rather than any problems at the motherhouse.

== Mounting debt ==
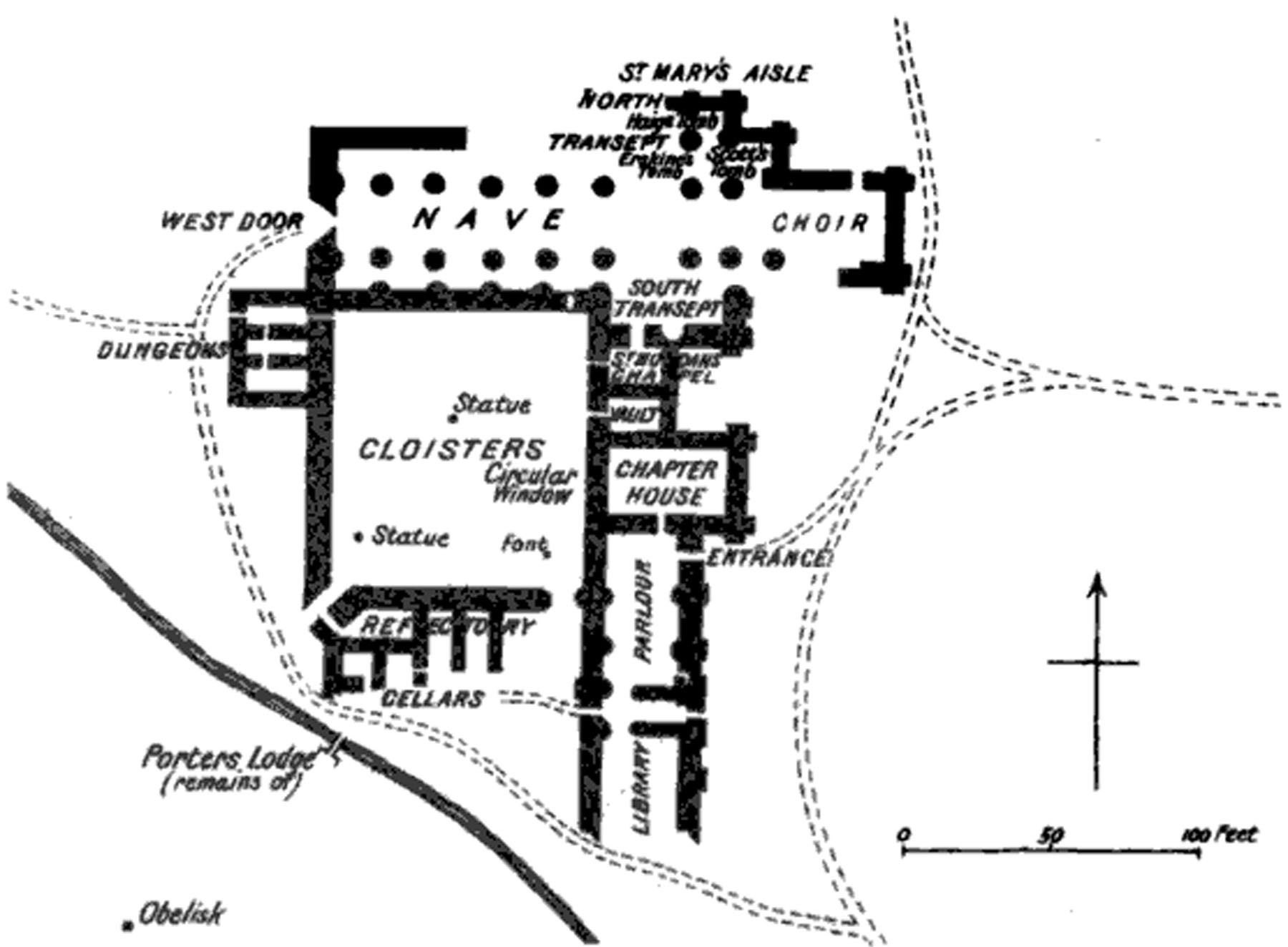
Ground plan of Dryburgh Abbey.

At the beginning of the 13th century, like its near neighbour Melrose Abbey, the abbey of Dryburgh began a rebuilding programme on a grander scale. However, building in stone and having an insecure income guaranteed that the construction work would be protracted. Also at this time, the monastery became embroiled in a series of legal proceedings concerning land ownership and tithe revenues. This resulted, in April 1221, in the Pope's legate spending much time at Dryburgh in adjudication. The construction effort was protracted and endured into the 1240s and with debts continuing to mount to the point that David de Bernham, Bishop of St Andrews gave Abbott John permission on 21 April 1242 to appoint his canons as vicars to the supporting churches stating

… since they have been burdened by grinding debts both on account of construction of the monastery and also on account of other and various necessities.

Pope Innocent IV granted the abbey in 1246, on the anniversary of its consecration, an indulgence lasting forty days intended to attract visitors who would hopefully be generous with their alms-giving. Additionally, he provided a suspension of the requirements to create pensions and benefices that might deplete the abbey's revenues; this safeguarded the monastery, its property and the canons themselves against legal redress.

Abbott John was blamed for ineffectual financial management and was required to resign and, on 13 January 1255 Pope Alexander IV wrote to the Bishop of St Andrews (position vacant at the time) and to Nicholas de Prenderlathe, abbot of Jedburgh demanding that most of the abbey's income be diverted to paying off debts while only a basic level of income was to be retained for day to day expenses. Slow improvement in the abbey's finances took place over the next forty or so years in a period of relative stability. However, this improvement was only relative; Dryburgh's neighbouring monasteries, with their much more extensive grazing lands, provided the main source of a much higher income.

== Changing patronage ==
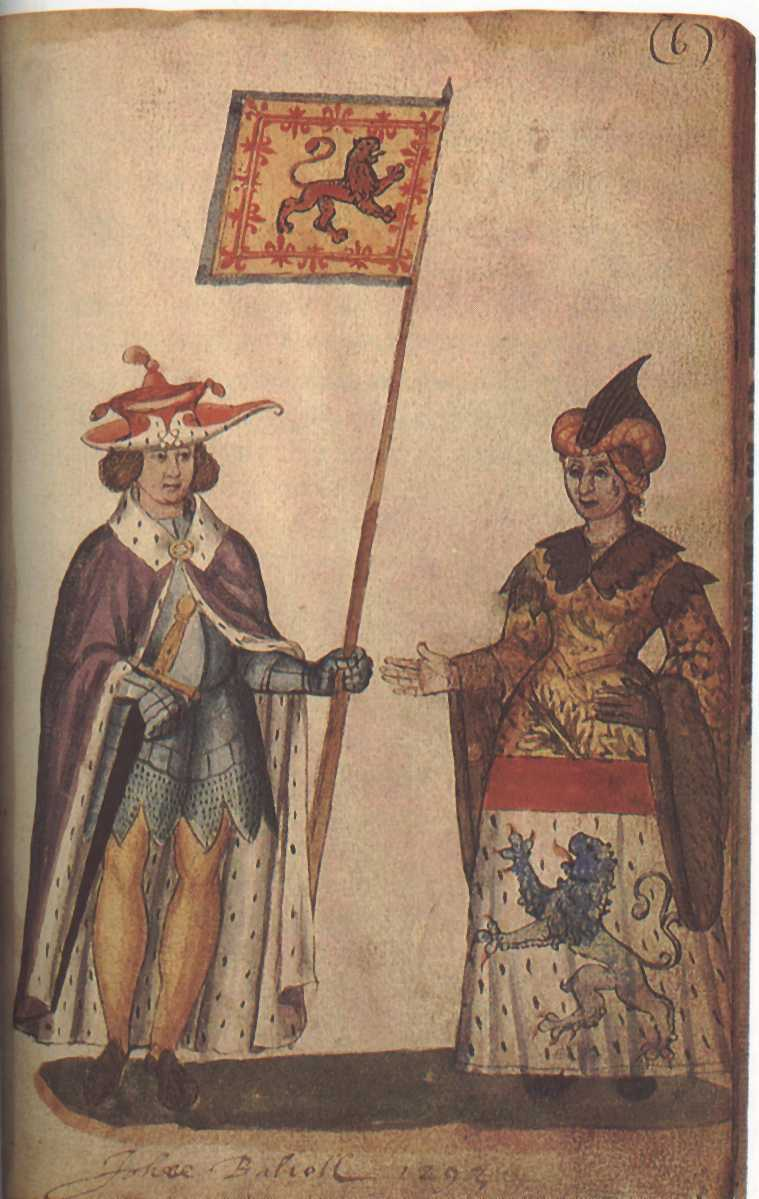
John Balliol and his queen.

Hugh de Morville's line had died out in 1196 on the death of his grandson, William, and the estates passed to William's sister, Helen, whose husband was Lochlann, Lord of Galloway. The semi-independent Lords of Galloway were much wealthier than the de Morvilles but even they could not lavish large amounts on all their dependencies. Lochlann was already benefactor to four religious houses in Galloway that included his own Cistercian establishment of Glenluce Abbey as well as being associated with Holyrood Abbey in Edinburgh and the Cumbrian abbey of Holmcultram and the priory of St Bees. Dryburgh being one of many establishments who sought the generosity of the Galloway lords got a further setback in 1234 when Alan, the last of the line of Galloway lords, died. His property was to be split between three daughters and their husbands. The lands previously held by the de Morvilles were divided again and in the 1250s were held by Helen of Galloway with her husband, Roger de Quincy, the Earl of Winchester, and Dervorguilla of Galloway with her husband, John I de Balliol, Lord of Barnard Castle and Gainford. These new owners in Lauderdale diluted the available patronage yet again as they themselves had pre-existing commitments however the de Quincys did provide a fishing in Mertoun Loch, a burgage at Haddington and lands at Gledswood near Bemerside. Devorguilla's main concern however was her own foundation at Sweetheart Abbey, but she was at Dryburgh in 1281 to settle her lands in England on her son, John Balliol, the future king. Balliol came to the throne of Scotland on St Andrews Day, 1292 but his reign was short and he abdicated in July 1296 following the defeats of the Scots at Berwick and Dunbar at the hands of King Edward I of England. This heralded the end of a long period of stability in the borderlands.

== Wars of Scottish Independence ==
The abbots of Dryburgh, Jedburgh, Melrose and Kelso all submitted to Edward I on 28 August 1296 at an event later to be described as the Ragman Rolls, and so on 2 September, Edward ordered that lands belonging to Dryburgh be restored. From this point up to the year 1316, very few records of the abbey exist; however, it is known that Sir Henry de Percy, one of the senior members of the English occupying force, placed himself and his cortege at Dryburgh in 1310. Despite the abbey's affiliation with the Balliol family, who remained resolutely at odds with the Bruce monarchy, the abbot and canons, before 21 October 1316, expelled two of their rank for refusing to acknowledge Robert as their king; a grateful King Edward II of England rewarded them by providing them with the rent and fishery of the abbey at Berwick.

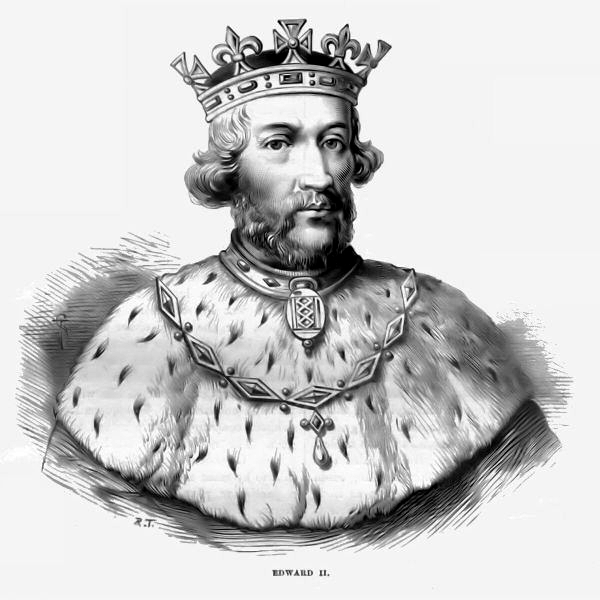
Edward II

Evidence is lacking on Robert's participation as a patron of Dryburgh. He certainly used the abbey as a base in July 1316 while conducting raiding expeditions into Northumberland. In retaliation for Bruce's raids in July 1322, Edward II of England took his army north in August y getting as far as Edinburgh. The English army retreated through Lauderdale and looted and burned both the abbeys of Melrose and Dryburgh. Melrose Abbey's reconstruction was generously provided for by Robert while Dryburgh's needs seem to have been ignored. It is unclear why Bruce chose to be so ungenerous towards the canons of Dryburgh, who only received the confirmation of a pre-existing rent of 20 shillings per annum

Walter Stewart, 6th High Steward of Scotland, Bruce's son-in-law, was not unsympathetic towards the abbey, transferring to it his entitlements from Maxton church and its lands and providing 4 acres (16,000 m^{2}) of land. In 1326, Bishop John de Lindsay of Glasgow endorsed the abbey's possession of the church and allowed the canons to use its considerable income to help fund the rebuilding process. Bruce's brother-in-law, Sir Andrew Murray a Guardian of Scotland during the exile of King David II may also have given holdings in his Smailholm lands Added to these were gifts from lesser donors; people like Patrick de Dunbar, earl of Marsh who gave a handful of possessions while Sir William Abernethy gave lands in Saltoun and various other minor nobles added further packets of land. Robert the Bruce died in June 1329 and in August 1332 Edward Balliol, son of the ousted king John, returned to Scotland with an army provided by the disinherited Scottish landowners and defeated the Scottish army at the Battle of Dupplin Moor, near Perth and had himself crowned King of Scots at Scone. In December, Balliol was attacked at his castle at Annan in Galloway by John Randolph, 3rd Earl of Moray and Sir Archibald Douglas and was forced to flee into England. With the support of King Edward III of England, Balliol was restored to the Scottish crown but at the price of having to make Edward his overlord and ceding to him the sheriffdoms of Berwick, Dumfries, Edinburgh, Peebles and Selkirk, including the forests of Ettrick and Jedburgh Dryburgh found itself once again under English domination. However, this did not adversely affect the abbey; Sir William de Felton, the new Sheriff of Roxburgh and Keeper of Roxburgh Castle, bought and granted to the abbey a significant burgage in Roxburgh.

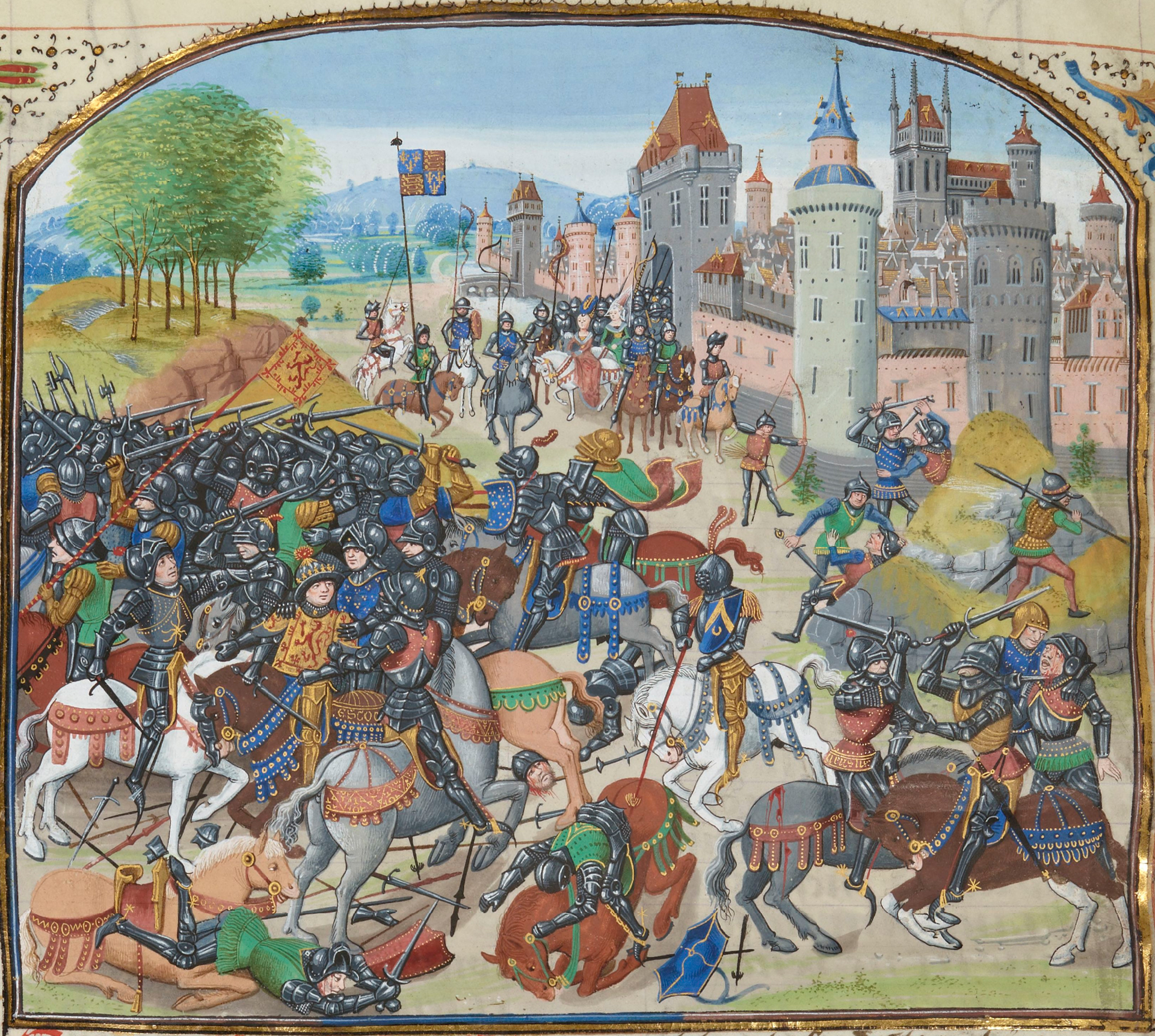
Battle of Neville's Cross

In 1334, Balliol was forced to Berwick for protection and the English were slowly finding their authority in the Lothians slipping away and only managed to hold power in the garrisoned centres and so in mid-July 1335, Edward III marched his army to Glasgow where he met with Balliol and his army and together they advanced to Perth. In October, following his campaign, Edward moved to Dryburgh Abbey where he expected the Scots to present him with their terms of surrender, but this did not happen. David II returned from France in 1342, and more of the lands held by Edward III were won back into Scottish control so that by 1346, the county of Roxburgh and the western parts of the county of Berwick were in the charge of the Bruce party. Patronage for the canons was once again provided by the Scottish lords; it is recorded that Sir John Maxwell gave the income from the Pencaitland church, in East Lothian. The Scottish lordship changed again when David was captured at the Battle of Neville's Cross and an English garrison took command at Roxburgh, putting the central lands of Tweeddale and all of Teviotdale firmly back under the control of England, and was to remain so for over twenty years. On 20 January 1356, Abbot Andrew of Dryburgh, along with the Abbots of Melrose, Jedburgh and Kelso, witnessed Edward Balliol's resignation. With the English victory over the French in September 1356, Scotland lost its continental ally, forcing it back to the negotiating table for David II's release from hostage. The treaty for the Scottish king's release was agreed on 3 October 1357 and four days later David was back in Scotland; under the terms of the treaty, 100,000 marks were to be paid to England over 10 years and England would retain its occupied lands until the ransom was paid in full.

== Borderland partition ==
David II's liberation from captivity in 1357 did not come without conditions, one of which was that Edward would hold on to the lands in the southeast of the country; this ensured that Dryburgh and the other border abbeys stayed in English-held territory. David allowed the abbeys to keep their Scottish possessions and did not interfere with the canons and monks from receiving the income from those. Dryburgh's records had all been lost at this time and it is only from what is known at Melrose that Dryburgh's position can be traced. The wool export trade and the resultant customs duty was important to David and so the Border abbeys who produced large amounts of wool were encouraged to use the Scottish ports at the expense of Edward's Berwick. The 1360s and 1370s saw the English hold over the Border areas diminish until it was basically the castles at Berwick, Jedburgh and Roxburgh with the county of Berwick and the eastern part of the county of Roxburgh still in their grip. Pressure on these strogholds intensified during 1384 and 1385, and Scottish raiding parties moved deep into England, forcing Richard II to launch his army on a hugely damaging incursion through the Borders to Edinburgh which he burned. On the way, he ordered the sacking of Dryburgh, Melrose and Newbattle.While Richard was in Newbattle Wood in August 1385, he took reprisals against all those in Teviotdale who had returned to the Scottish cause.

== Turning point ==
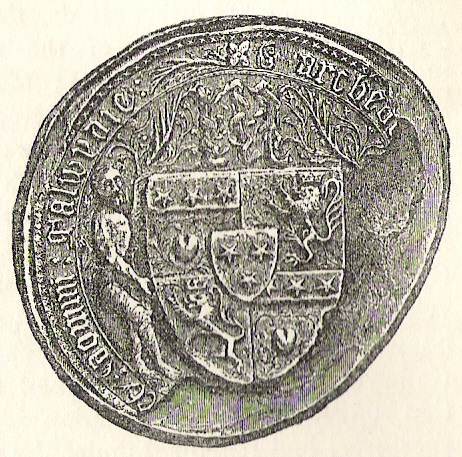
Seal of Archibald Douglas

The damage caused to Dryburgh was great and influential nobles seemed to have played a significant part in its restoration—in the closing years of the 1380s it seems that Robert Stewart, Earl of Fife, Archibald Douglas, 3rd Earl of Douglas and Walter Trail, Bishop of St Andrews all had roles in assisting the abbey to extricate itself from this disaster. King Robert III, in a charter dated 9 March 1391, granted to the canons all the very substantial income-rich possessions of the Cistercian nuns of South Berwick which had been destroyed by Richard II in 1385. The family of the Black Douglases continued with their support and in around 1420 Archibald, fourth earl of Douglas gave Dryburgh the income from the possessions of Smailholme parish church. The fifth earl continued the grant of Smailholm and went further in 1429 by asking the pope to formally confirm this together with the inclusion of the hospitals of St Leonards of Lauder and Smailholme. In 1443, the canons suffered once again when fire destroyed the abbey, evidently by accident yet eighteen years later in 1461, the abbey is recorded as requesting protection from Pope Pius II inferring that the canons were finding it difficult to finance the repairs.

== The final century ==
The abbey lost the patronage of Robert Stewart, Duke of Albany on his death in 1420. In 1455 with the forfeiture of the lands of the Black Douglases, they lost a major benefactor and protector in James Douglas, 9th Earl of Douglas. The election of Walter Dewer as abbot in 1461 was seemingly the last prelate to be elected by the canons,.It was under his abbacy that alienation of the monastery lands began. Throughout the later 15th century, the abbacy was repeatedly contested by local canons and external rivals, leading to expulsions, papal refusals, and occasional royal intervention.

=== Commendators ===
King James IV rewarded clerics who had served him well by providing them with commendatorships. The first commendator of Dryburgh Abbey was Andrew Forman, the Bishop of Moray in 1509. Forman's primary role in James's service was as a diplomat, being employed extensively in Europe; he accumulated much wealth from his religious and other appointments.

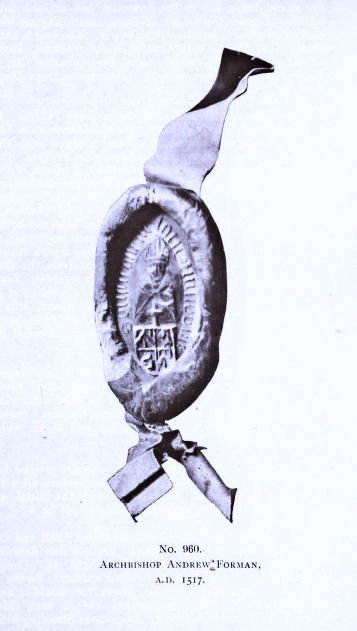
Seal of Archbishop Andrew Forman

He received the commendatorships of the abbey of Culross in 1492, however, he stepped down the following year after receiving a large pension from the abbey. In June 1497 he was prior of Pittenweem, received the rectory of Cottingham from King Henry VII of England in May 1501, was commendator of Kelso (although he was unable to firmly establish this provision), as well as the Keeper of Darnaway Castle, Chamberlain of Moray and Custumar North of the Spey in 1511.

Forman gave up his rights to Dryburgh sometime after becoming Archbishop of St Andrews and was succeeded by James Ogilvie, another secular cleric and diplomat who received the temporalities of the abbey in August 1516. He held the commendatorship only briefly, dying in 1518.

David Hamilton, Bishop of Argyll, and the younger brother of James, Lord Hamilton, Earl of Arran, was the next to be proposed to the Abbey by John Stewart, Duke of Albany and became commendator in May 1519. He died in 1523.

The next to be provided to the abbey was James Stewart, a canon from Glasgow Cathedral. Although named in a letter from Albany to Cardinal Accolti, Cardinal Protector for Scotland in Rome, Albany actually gave the commendatorship to the Earl of Lennox, who in turn sold or gave his right to it to Stewart who then borrowed from money lenders in Paris to purchase the confirming papal bulls. Stewart received the temporalities of the abbey on 6 October 1526 until his death 1539.

Pope Paul III received King James V's recommendation of Thomas Erskine as the next commendator in November 1539 but was not confirmed until April 1541 due to a contesting provision. In 1541, hostilities between Scotland and England resumed, but Dryburgh remained untouched until 7 November 1544 when Edward Seymour, earl of Hertford, burned the town of Dryburgh and its abbey. He returned in 1545, again setting fire to the abbey. Erskine was captured at Dover when the Scottish warship he was aboard foundered while en route to France, prompting Marie de Guise, widow of James V, to call for his release. Erskine was ransomed for £500, and Dryburgh would have been expected to provide amply to the settlement; it may have been the need to obtain funds that, in July 1548, he resigned his commendatorship to his brother John.

Like most of his commendatory forebears, John Erskine took very little interest in the spiritual side of the abbey but was an important personage in the politics of Scotland during the reigns of James V, Mary, Queen of Scots, and James VI. John was commendator until 1556 when he stepped down in favour of his nephew, David Erskine.

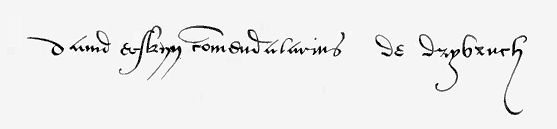
Signature of David Erskine, Commendator of Dryburgh

David Erskine received the bulls confirming his office in July 1556 and quickly set about alienating the abbey's possessions by granting lands to important local families. Erskine took part in the kidnapping of James VI, known as the Raid of Ruthven, but when the king escaped from his imprisonment in Ruthven Castle, he and his accomplices fled to England. Erskine was deprived of his lands, and the commendatorship of Dryburgh Abbey was given to William Stewart.

William Stewart held the commendatorship for just over a year when, in 1585, David Erskine found favour once more with James VI and all of his possessions and appellations were reinstated.

In June 1600, Erskine wrote to a relative saying that all the canons had now died and marked the ending of the monastery. In 1604, the remaining possessions of the abbey were integrated into the Lordship of Cardross of John Erskine, the then Earl of Mar. Henry Erskine, Mar's son received the titular title of commendator of Dryburgh Abbey.

== Routine of the canons ==
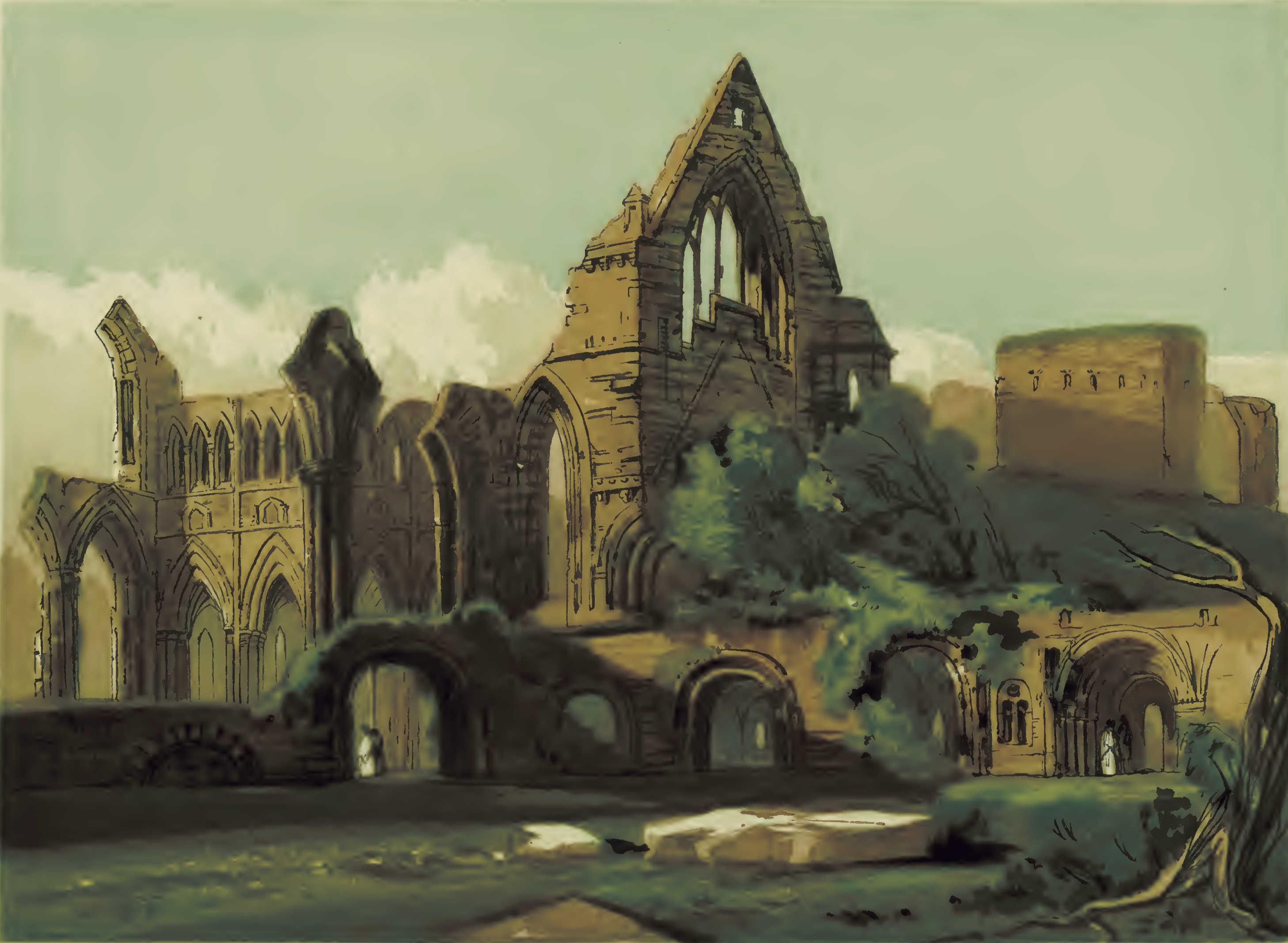
Dryburgh Abbey, circa. 1860

The daily routine of the canons was made up of religious services, agricultural duties, household functions, copying books and reading. In detail, this would have been:

- The canonical hour of Matins was held in the early morning when the canons were wakened by the dormitory bell. They would proceed to the church for the first service of the day following which they returned to bed.
- The Prime service was held at 6 a.m. when the canons were re-awakened and summoned to church for mass; they would remain in private prayers until the bell announcing the daily meeting in the chapter house.
- The community would assemble in the cloister then proceed to the chapter house where a lesson from the rules of the order was read. Any transgressors were held to account for their actions and any punishments carried out by the prior.
- In winter, at the hour of Tierce, or 9 a.m., following on from the meeting of the chapter, the canons would proceed in pairs to the church for the singing of hymns. In summer, there was a longer interval before Tierce so that the abbey duties could be performed. The summer Tierce was a high mass.
- High mass was performed at the hour of Sext, or mid-day, in winter.
- The community ate at 1 p.m. where only two dishes were served except on certain occasions when an additional sweet dish, called a pittance was provided. If someone was late for the meal then unless he had an adequate excuse, he would have to sit at the most remote of the tables and perhaps with no wine or ale.
- After the dinner, some canons rested while others conversed until the hour of Nones, or 3 p.m. when the canons proceeded to church for another service after which, the community were required to wash their hands and wait in the cloister until summoned to the refectory to drink.
- At 6 p.m. the canons attended Vespers.
- The Compline, the last of the day's worship was held after 7 p.m. followed by a light supper and then bed.
- There were no sheets on the dormitory beds and the canons were required to sleep in their habit
- in the Autumn, the agricultural canons would leave for the fields early in the morning and occasionally would not return until after vespers. They had to recite their prayers at the appointed hours as they toiled, however.

== List of abbots ==
Abbots

- Roger, 1152–1177
- Gerard, 1177-1184x1188
- Adam, 1184–1188
- Richard, 1188x1193,1190
- Alan, 1193–1196
- Geoffrey, 1203–1209
- William, 1209–1210
- Thomas, 1200x1234.
- Hugh, 1221–1229
- Henry, ?1230
- Walter, 1236–1240
- John, 1240-1245x1255
- Oliver, 1262–1273 x
- William, 1296
- Roger, 1308 x1309
- William, 1316–1324
- David, 1324x1328-1342
- Andrew, 1350-c. 1367–69
- John, 1381–1406
- William de Dryburgh, 1408
- John de Aberdeen, 1408–1414
- Thomas de Merton, 1434
- James Crawford, 1444–1445
- Walter de Var, 1461–1476 x 1477
- John Crawford, 1478–1482
- Hugh Douglas, 1477 x 1482
- Andrew Lidderdale, 1482–1508
- Thomas Hay, 1482
- John Fenton, 1483
- David Dinac, 1483
- David Finlayson, 1509

Commendators

- Andrew Forman, 1509–1514 x 1516
- James Ogilvie, 1515–1518
- David Hamilton, 1519–1523
- James Stewart, 1523–1539
- Thomas Erskine, Master of Erskine 1539–1551
- Robert Waucope, 1539–1544 x 1548
- Robert Frasin, 1548
- John Erskine, Earl of Mar 1548–1556
- David Erskine, 1556–1584; 1585–1604
- William Stewart, 1585
- Henry Erskine, 1604–1628

== Fat Lips ==
There is a legend that the ruins of Dryburgh Abbey is the home of a benevolent spirit called Fat Lips. A woman who lost her lover in the 1745 Jacobite Rebellion made her home in the ruined abbey and claimed that Fat Lips, a little man in iron boots, used to tidy her cell for her.

== Tourism ==
This Abbey is part of five other abbeys and historic sights through Scotland on Borders Abbeys Way walk.

== Gallery ==
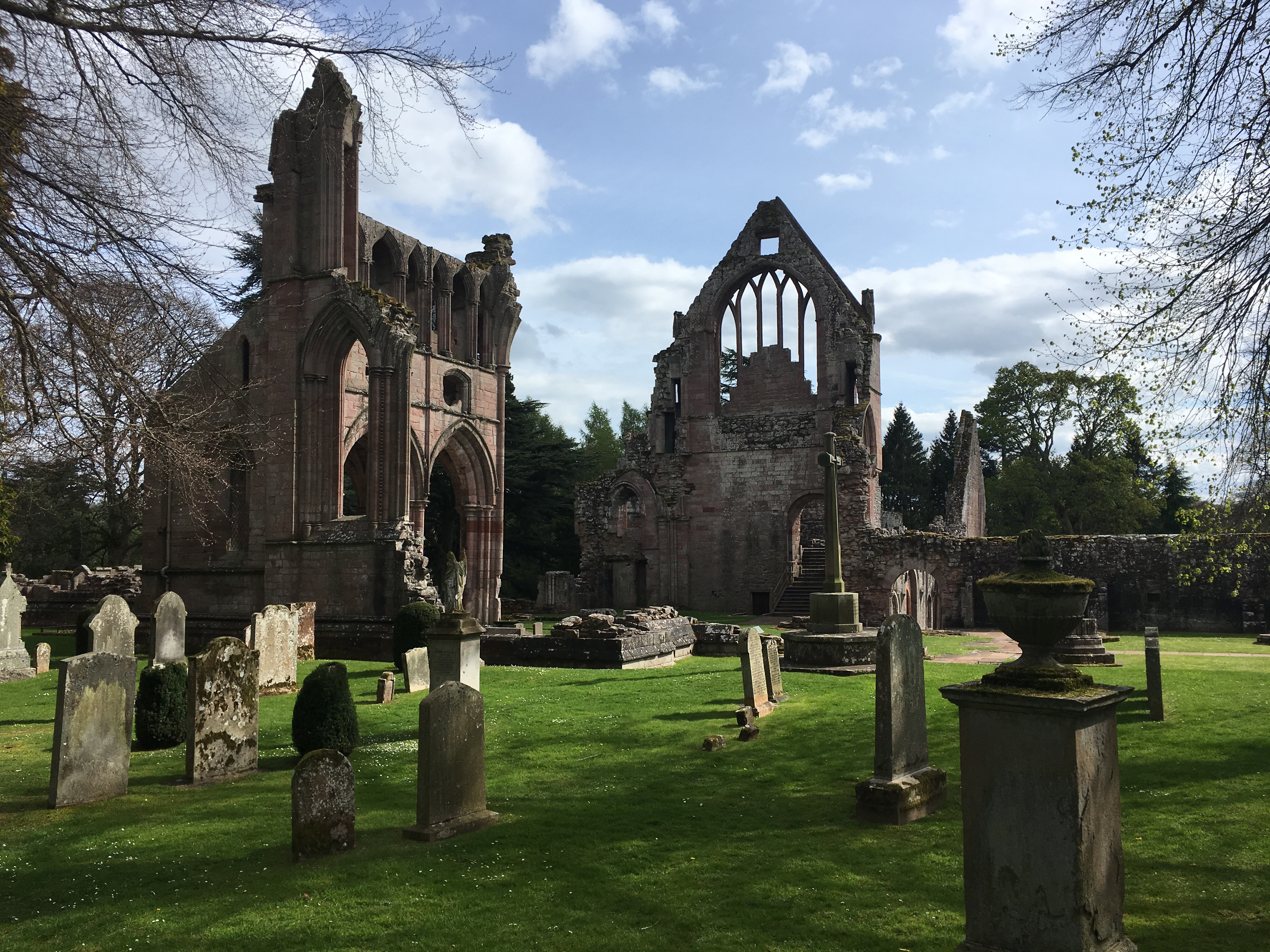
Dryburgh Abbey

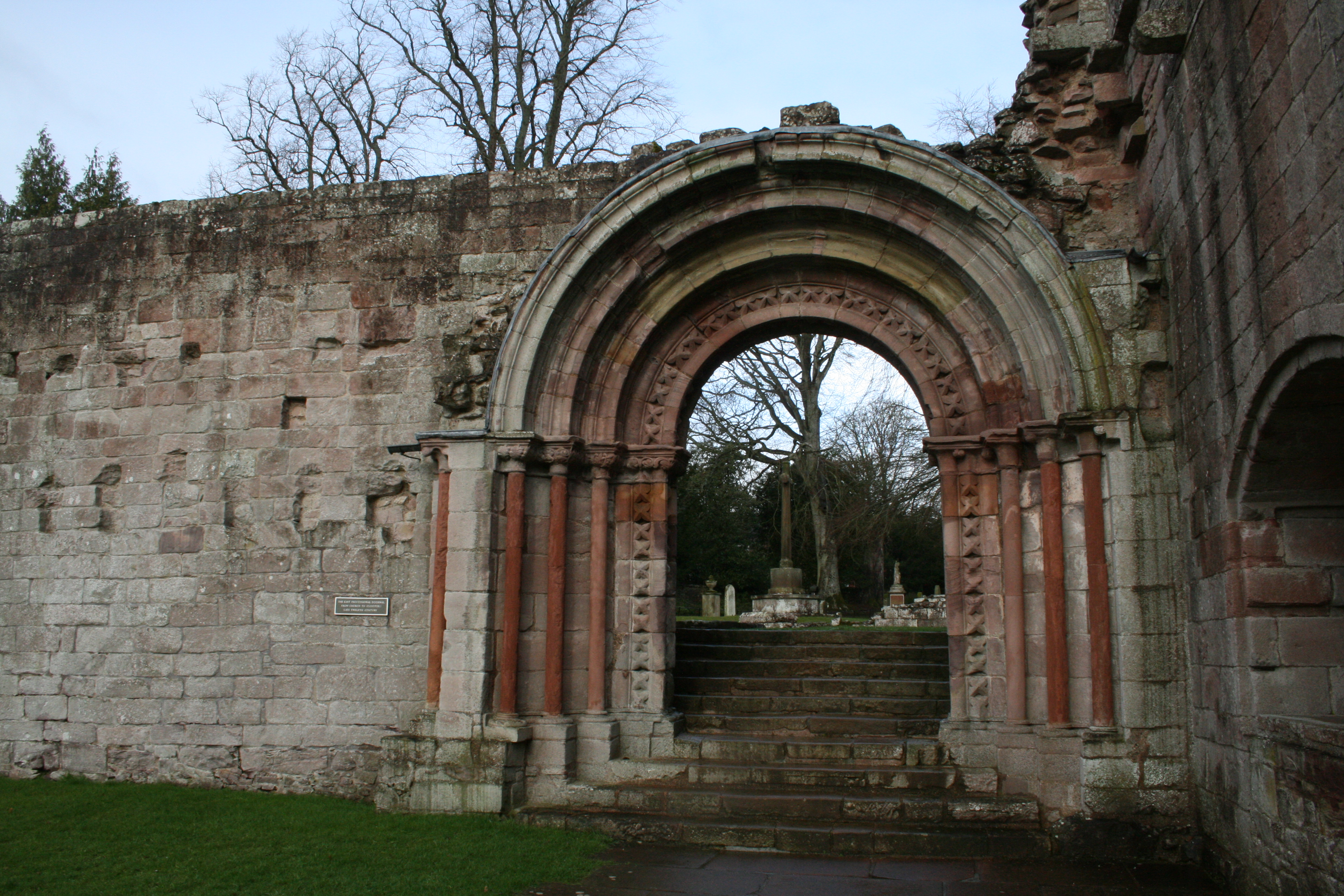
Entrance of Dryburgh Abbey Chapterhouse

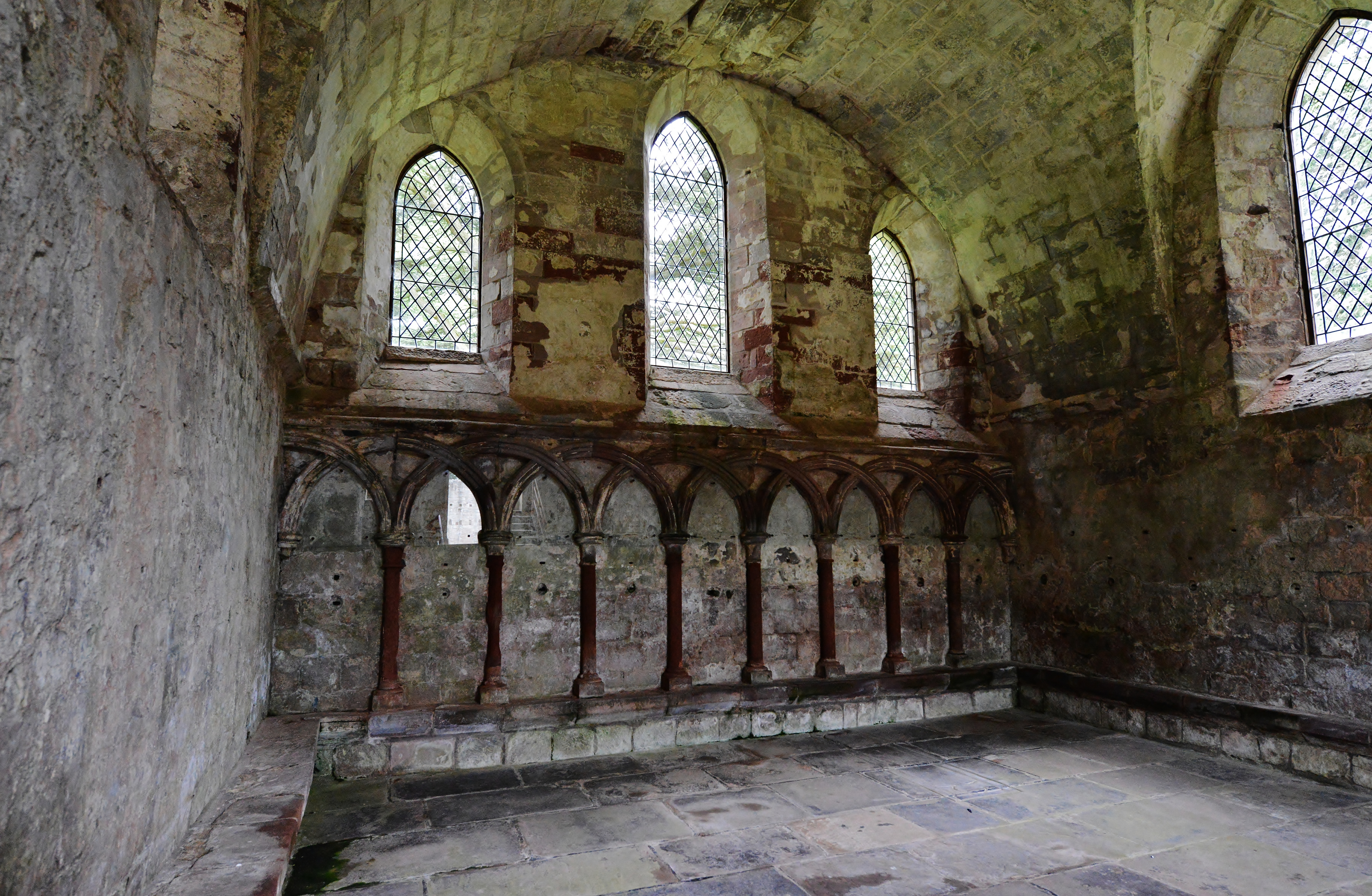
Interior of Dryburgh Abbey Chapterhouse

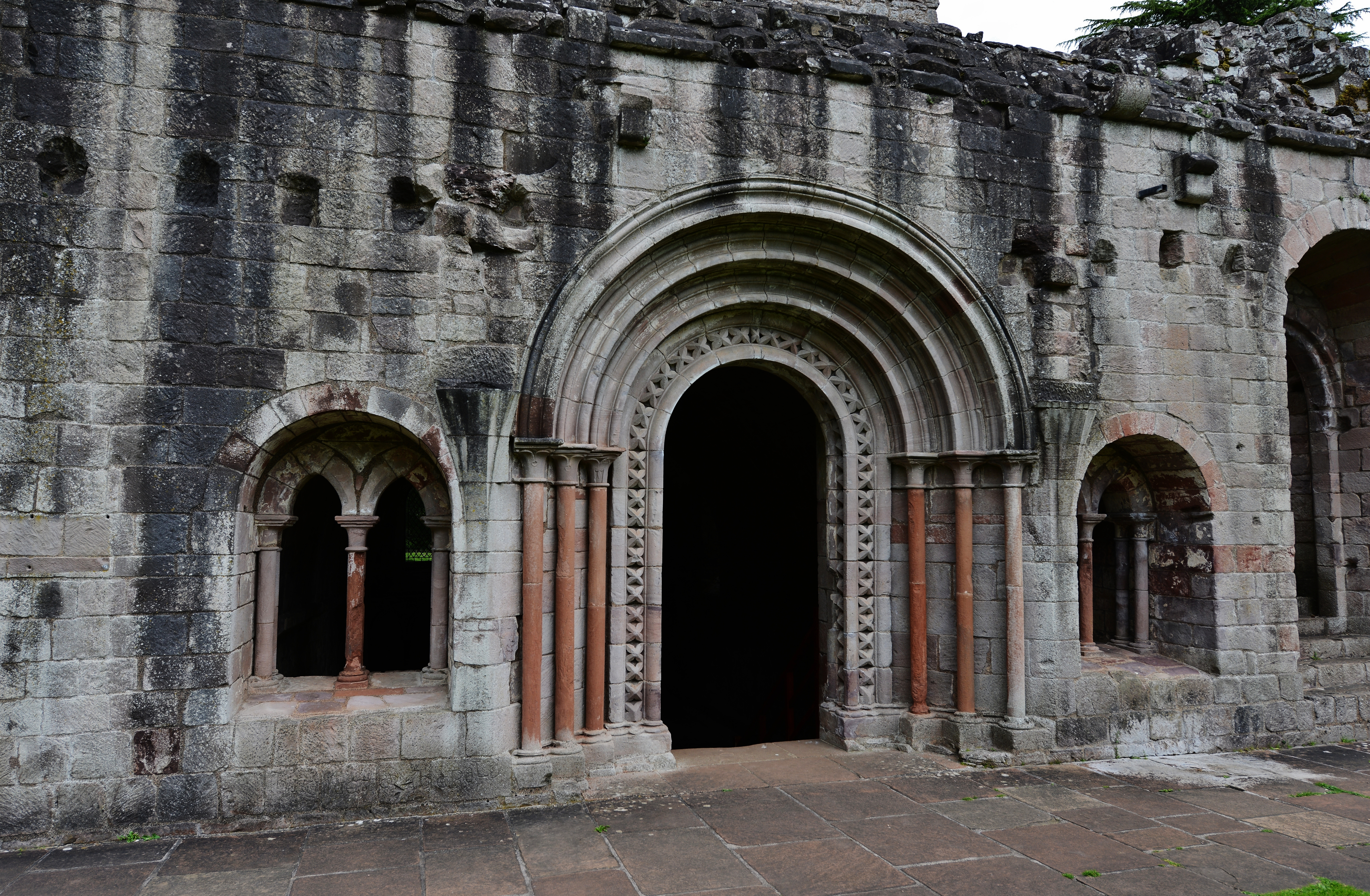
Doorway of the Chapterhouse

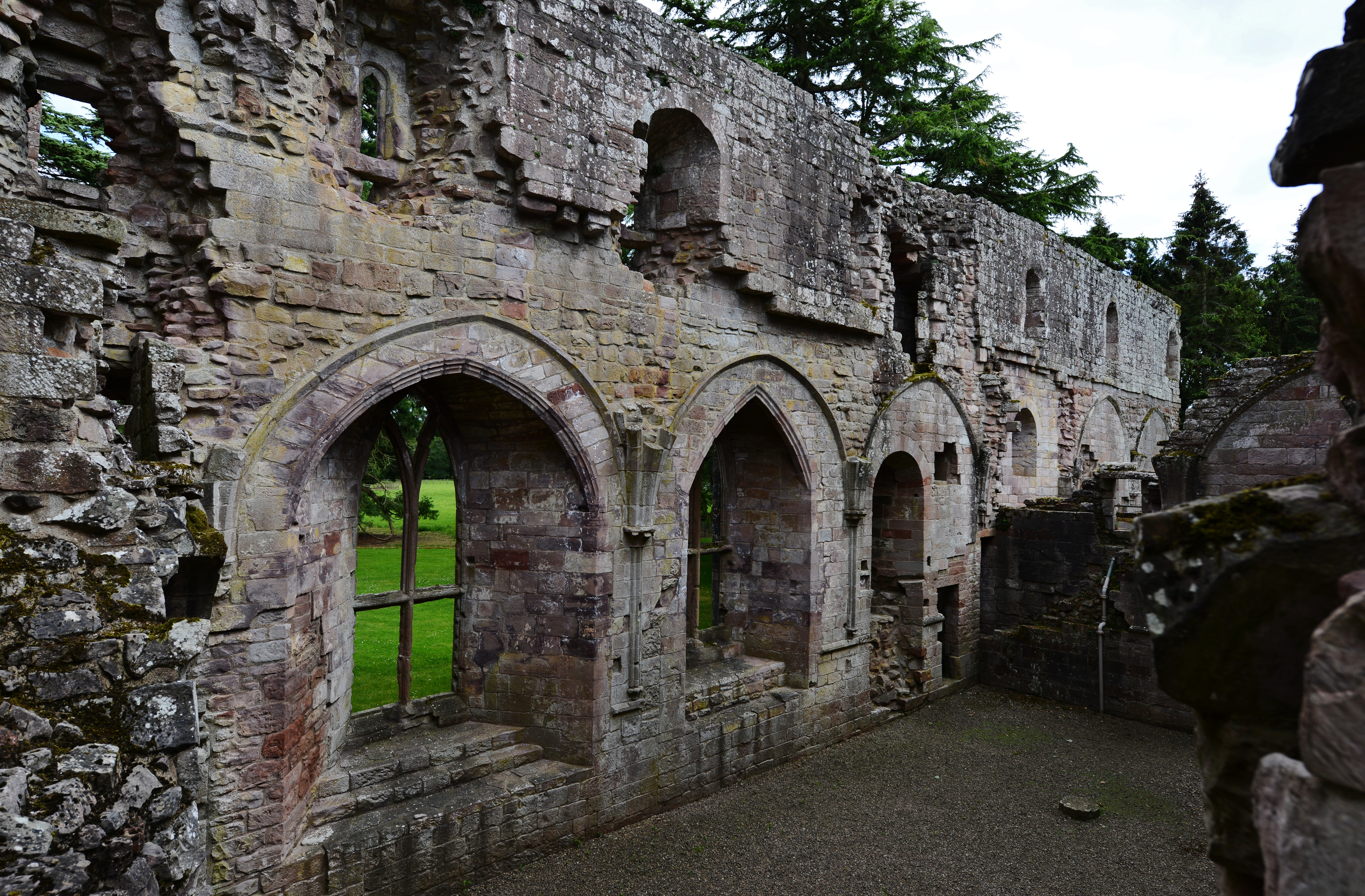
Dryburgh Abbey Calefactory (Warming House)

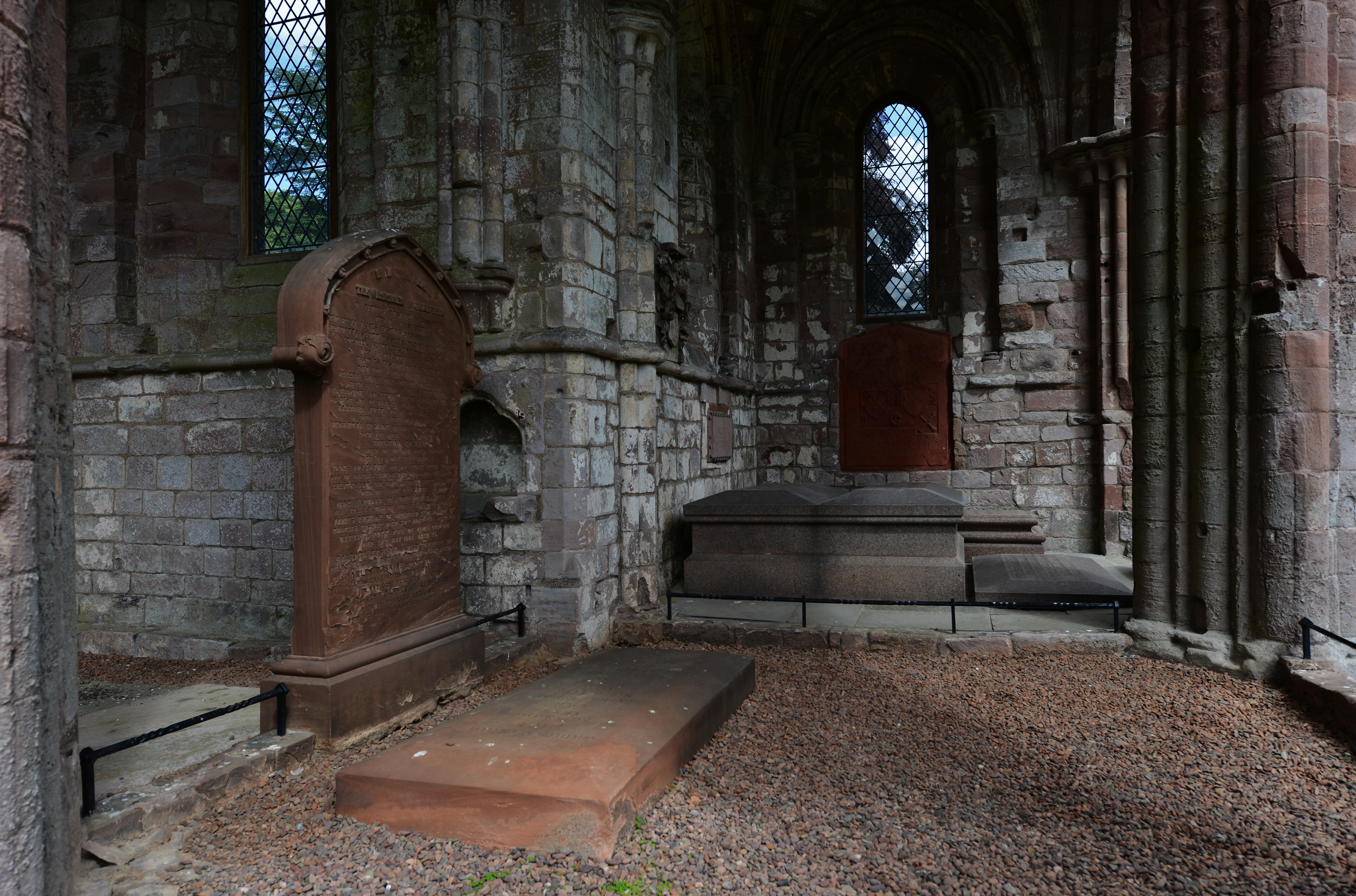
North Transept Chapel

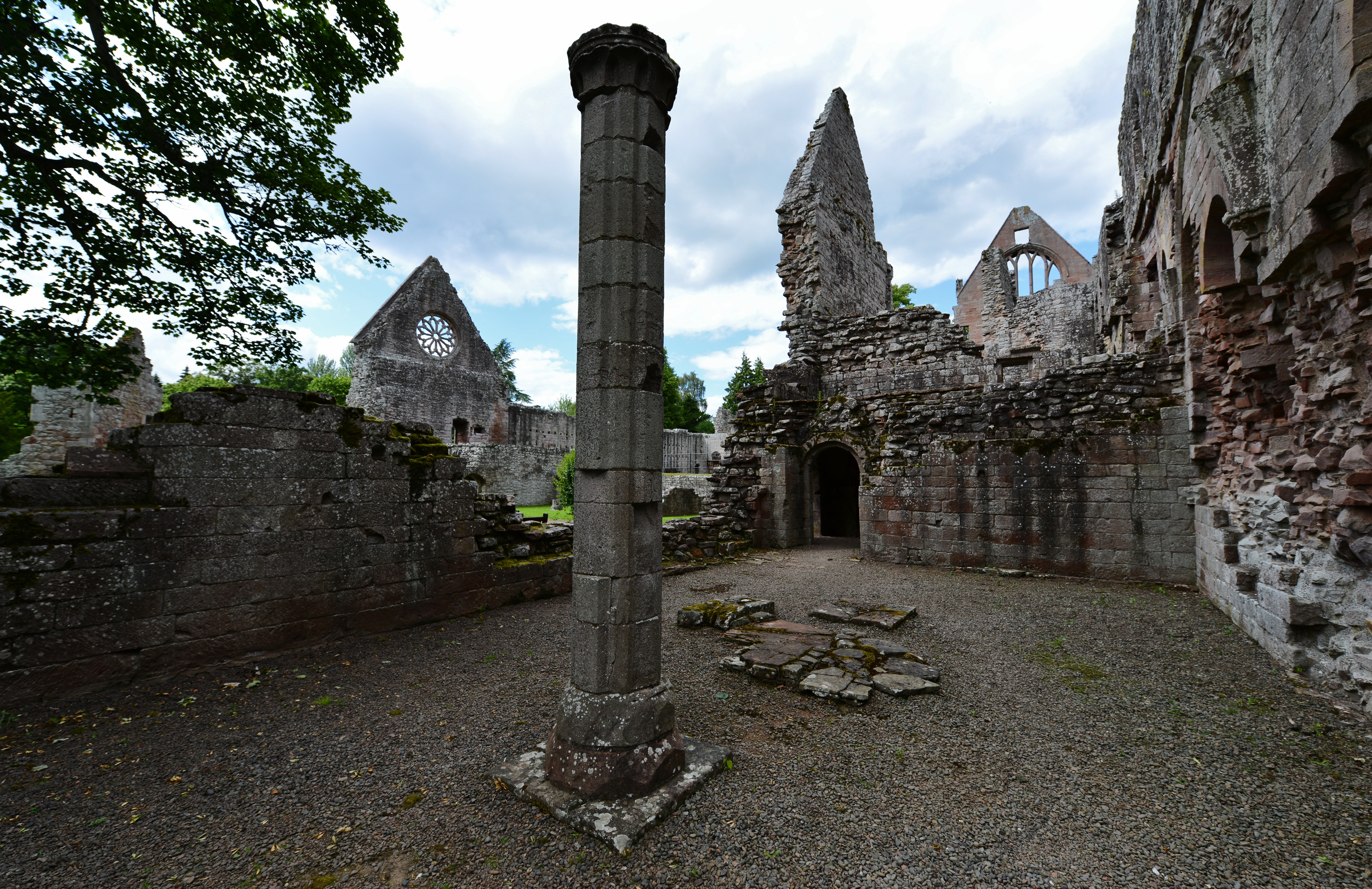
View from Novice's Day Room

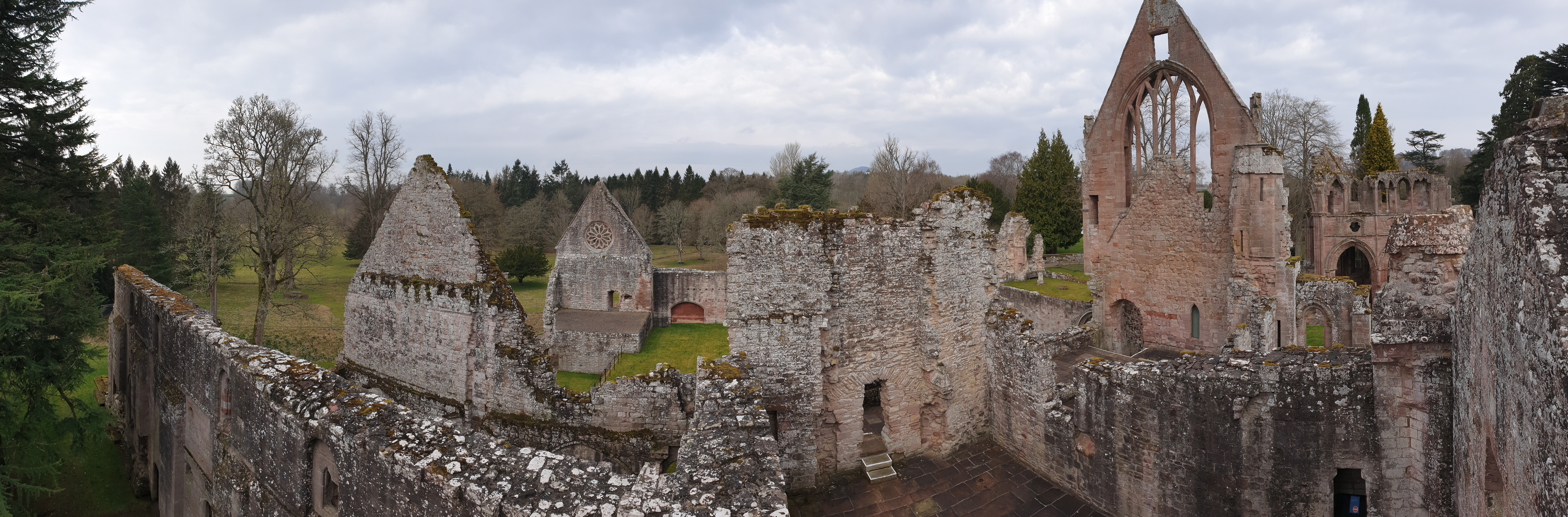
Cloister of Dryburgh Abbey in the morning, taken from tower in commendator's accommodation

== See also ==
- List of places in the Scottish Borders
- List of places in Scotland

== Bibliography ==
- Anderson, A.O. et al., ed. Chronicle of Melrose, London, 1936. [Chron. Melrose]
- Bain, J., ed., Calendar of Documents Relating to Scotland, Edinburgh, 1881-8. [CDS]
- Bannatyne Club, Liber Sancte Marie de Dryburgh, Edinburgh, 1847 [Dryburgh Liber]
- Bannatyne Club, Liber Sancte Marie de Melros, Edinburgh, 1837 [Mel. Liber]
- Barrow, G.W.S., ed.Regesta Regum Scotorum, ed. Edinburgh, 1971. ISBN 0-85224-142-9 [RRS]
- Brooke, D., Wildmen and Holy Places, Edinburgh, 1994. [Brooke, Wild Men and Holy Places]
- Brown, M., The Black Douglases, East Linton, 1998. [Brown, Black Douglases]
- Boardman, Stephen I., The Early Stewart Kings: Robert II and Robert III, 1371 to 1406, Edinburgh, Reprint 2007. [Boardman, Early Stewart Kings]
- Cowan, I.B., Ayrshire Abbeys: Crossraguel and Kilwinning, Ayrshire Archaeological and Natural History Society, 1986. [Cowan, Crossraguel and Kilwinning]
- Cowan, I.B. & Dunlop, A.I., eds. Calendar of Scottish Supplications to Rome, 1428–32, Scottish History Society, 1970 [CSSR, 1428–33]
- Dunbar, Sir Archibald H., Bt., Scottish Kings – A Revised Chronology of Scottish History 1005–1625, Edinburgh, 1899. [Scottish Kings]
- Duncan, A.A.M, ed., Regesta Regum Scotorum, v, the Acts of Robert I, Edinburgh, 1988. [RRS, v]
- Fawcett, Richard & Oram, Richard, Dryburgh Abbey, Stroud, Gloucestershire, 2005. ISBN 0-7524-3439-X [Fawcett & Oram, Dryburgh Abbey]
- Fawcett, Richard & Oram, Richard, Melrose Abbey, Stroud, Gloucestershire, 2004. ISBN 0-7524-2867-5 [Fawcett & Oram, Melrose Abbey]
- Ferguson, P.C., Medieval Papal Representatives in Scotland: Legates, Nuncios, and Judge Delegates, 1125–1286, Stair Society, 1997. [Ferguson, Papal Representatives]
- Lindsay, E.R. & Cameron, A.I., eds. Calendar of Scottish Supplications to Rome, 1418–22, Scottish History Society, 1934 [CSSR, 1418–22]
- Morton, James, The Monastic Annals of Teviotdale, Edinburgh, 1837 [Morton, Monastic Annals]
- Nicholson, R., Scotland: the Later Middle Ages, London, 1979. [Nicholson, Later Middle Ages]
- Stringer, K.J., ed. The Early Lords of Lauderdale, Dryburgh Abbey and St Andrews Priory at Northampton in "Essays on the Nobility of Medieval Scotland", Edinburgh, 1985. [Stringer, Early Lords]
- Thorpe, M.J., ed. Calendar of State Papers Relating to Scotland, i, 1509–1589, London, 1858. [CSPS]
- Thomson, T. & Innes, C., eds. Acts of the Parliaments of Scotland, Edinburgh, 1814–75. [APS]
- Watt, D.E.R and Shead, N.F., The Heads of Religious Houses in Scotland from Twelfth to Sixteenth Centuries, Scottish Record Society, 2001. [Watt & Shead, Heads of Religious Houses]
- Watt, D.E.R., ed., Walter Bower, Scotichronicon, 9 vols., Aberdeen & Edinburgh, 1987–97. [Bower, Scotichronicon]
