= Fat Lips =

Legendary spirit in Scotland

Coordinates: 55°34′37.5″N 2°38′58″W

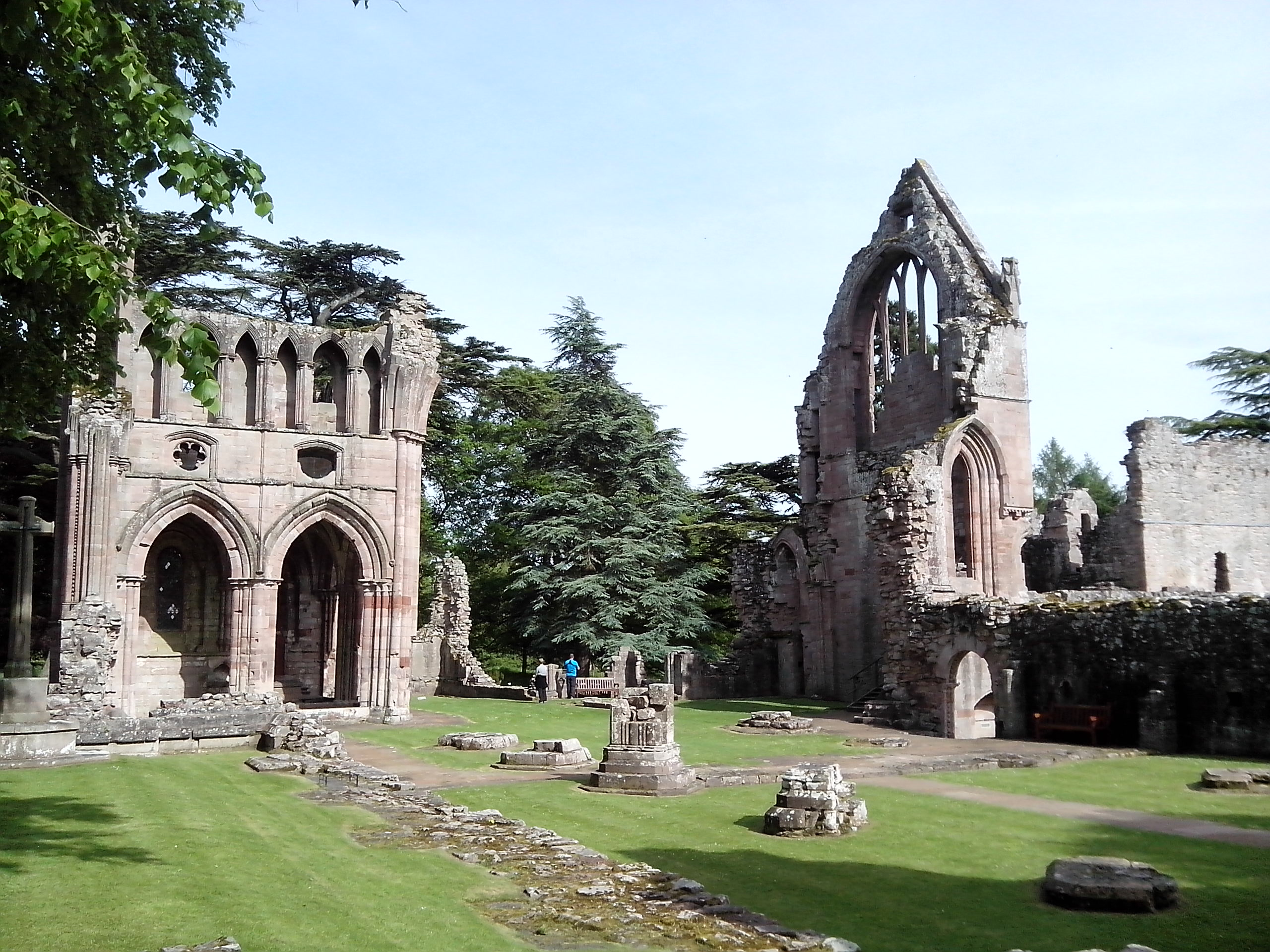
The ruins of Dryburgh Abbey

Fat Lips (or Fatlips) is the name given to a legendary spirit dwelling in Dryburgh Abbey in Berwickshire, Scotland.

The spirit was associated with a homeless woman who moved into a vault beneath the ruins of the abbey some time after the 1745 Jacobite rising. The woman claimed that the spirit, "Fatlips," was a little man who tidied the room while she was away, and kept the cell she lived in dry by stamping moisture away from the ground with his heavy iron boots.
