= Adam of Dryburgh =

Anglo-Scottish theologian and writer (c. 1140 – c. 1212)

- Born: c. 1140
- Died: c. 1212

Philosophical work
- Era: Medieval philosophy
- Region: Western Philosophy
- School: Premonstratensian, Carthusian
- Main interests: Mysticism, Asceticism, Carthusian ideal
- Notable ideas: Various spiritual and monastic ideals

Adam of Dryburgh (c. 1140 – c. 1212), in later times also known as Adam the Carthusian, Adam Anglicus and Adam Scotus, was an Anglo-Scottish theologian, writer and Premonstratensian and Carthusian monk.

== Life ==
He was born around 1140 in the Anglo-Scottish border area (Northumberland & Scottish Borders) to parents whose names and identities are unknown. The details of his earliest education are not known. He is known to have rejected a clerical life in favour of monasticism, entering the Premonstratensian house of Dryburgh Abbey as a young man and becoming a priest there in 1165, at the age of twenty-five.

Adam served under the first two abbots, Roger and Gerard, before in 1184 Adam himself became abbot. It is not clear if Adam became a full abbot or if he was just acting abbot or coadjutor. Abbot Gerard may have become incapacitated by illness, and Adam apparently refused to be blessed by a bishop while Abbot Gerard still lived. Adam was summoned to Prémontré, France, by its abbot, the head of Adam's order. While in France Adam visited the Carthusian priory of Val St Pierre, which impressed him so much that he himself vowed to become a Carthusian, resigning his abbacy at Dryburgh. In this, he was following in the footsteps of Abbot Roger, the first head of Dryburgh Abbey, who had retired to Val St Pierre in 1177.

Adam returned to Britain and visited Hugh of Lincoln, Bishop of Lincoln. After consulting with this senior Carthusian figure and future saint, Adam joined Hugh's old priory at Witham, Somerset. The Premonstratensians did not give up trying to get him back, however, and it was only after the intervention from Bishop Hugh that a letter of release was issued to Adam. Adam would remain at Witham until his death, perhaps in the year 1212. Known for strict moral conduct, he is said to have been of medium height and was noted for his cheerfulness, his skill as a preacher and his good memory.

== Works ==
Adam was also a prolific writer, which included many sermons as well as theological and other religious texts. Among his most famous works were:

- De tripartito tabernaculo, written at Dryburgh in 1180,
- Liber de quadripartito exercitio cellae (The fourfold exercise of the cell), written at Witham in about 1190. Until the early 20th century the work was generally wrongly attributed to Guigo II.
- Liber de ordine, habitu et professione canonicorum ordinis Praemonstratensis
- Over 60 sermons also survive

His writings were first published by Aegidius Gourmont in Paris in 1518, though there is still no modern scholarly edition of his works.

In the mid-sixteenth century, the churchman John Bale theorised the existence of a separate theologian called Adam the Carthusian, who Bale believed flourished around 1340; Bale attributed six works to that writer. It is now acknowledged, however, that this distinct Adam the Carthusian never existed, and that all these works were written by others.

== See also ==
- Abbot of Dryburgh
- Dryburgh Abbey
- Witham Friary

== Notes ==
Catholic Church titles
Preceded by Gerard	Abbot of Dryburgh; 1184–x1188	Succeeded by Richard
