= Dryburgh (surname) =

Dryburgh is a surname. Notable people with the surname include:

- Dave Dryburgh (1908–1948), Scotland-born Canadian sports journalist
- Douglas Dryburgh (born 1966), Scottish-Irish curler
- Jack Dryburgh (born 1939), British ice hockey player and coach
- James Dryburgh (born 1975), Scottish-Swedish curler
- Margaret Dryburgh (1890–1945), missionary
- Stuart Dryburgh (born 1952), New Zealand cinematographer
- Willie Dryburgh (1876–1951), Scottish footballer
