= Abbot of Dryburgh =

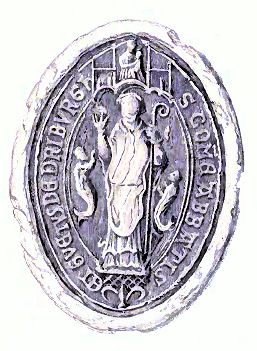
Seal of abbot of Dryburgh

The Abbot of Dryburgh (later, Commendator of Dryburgh) was the head of the Premonstratensian community of canons regular of Dryburgh Abbey in the Scottish Borders. The monastery was founded in 1150 by canons regular from Alnwick Abbey with the patronage of Hugh de Morville, Lord of Lauderdale. In the 16th century the monastery increasingly came under secular control, and was eventually incorporated into the lordship of Cardross. The following is a list of abbots and commendators:

== List of abbots ==
ABBOT	TENURE	REIGN	NOTES
Roger (I)	1152 – 1177	David I, Malcolm IV, William I	First abbot of Dryburgh; resigned 1177.
Gerard (Girardus)	1177–1184x1188	William I	He was the prior before his elevation.
Adam of Dryburgh	1184–1188	William I	
Richard	c.1188–c.1193	William I	
Alan	1193–1196	William I	
Geoffrey (Galfrid)	1203–1209	William I	Promoted to the motherhouse to become abbot of Alnwick.
William (I)	1209–1210	William I	He was prior during Geoffrey’s abbacy.
Thomas (I)	1200x1234	William I, Alexander II	
Hugh	1221–1229	Alexander II	
Henry	?1230	Alexander II	
Walter (I)	1236–1240	Alexander II	He resigned due to continuing abbey debts.
John (I)	1240–1245x1255	Alexander II	
Oliver	1262–1273 x	Alexander III	
Thomas (II)	?1270	Alexander III	Grants an undated charter, thought to be from 1270, to the chaplain of Alan, Lord of Galloway
William (II)	1296	Edward I of England	On 28 August 1296 he submitted along with abbots of Jedburgh, Kelso, and Melrose to King Edward I of England
Roger (II)	1308x1309	Robert I	
William (III)	1316–1324	Robert I	King Edward II of England burned the abbey in August 1322 along with abbeys of Holyrood and Melrose.
Roger (III)	1324x1328	Robert I	occurs as witness to a charter, granted between 1324 and 1328, by which Sir John de Graham confirmed the whole of Eskdale to the monks of Melrose.
David (I)	1324x1328–1342	Robert I, David II, Edward Balliol	
Andrew (I)	1350–c.1367–69	Edward Balliol, David II	Andrew witnessed, as a vassal of King Edward III of England, Edward Balliol’s resignation of all rights to the Scottish crown at Roxburgh on 20 January 1356.
John (II)	1381–1406	Robert II, Robert III	King Robert III gave to the abbey the wealthy properties of the nuns of Southberwick in compensation for the destruction of the abbey by Richard II in 1385.
William (IV) de Dryburgh	1408	James I	
John (III) de Aberdeen	1408–1414	James I	
Thomas (III) de Merton	1434	James I	
James Crawford	1444–1445	James II	
Walter de Var (Dewar)	1461–1476 x 1477	James III	Last abbot to have his provision without challenge and first documentary evidence of alienation of abbey property.
John (IV) Crawford	1477–1482	James III	Papal confirmation of his appointment in 1477. He tried to regain some of the properties alienated by his predecessor.
Hugh Douglas	1477x1482	James III	Challenged Crawford\’s abbacy in 1477 and was successful in gaining provision to the abbey but then was expelled from the convent. In 1482 Douglas counter-challenged Crawford but in that same year and before the claim could be heard, Crawford died. Douglas thereby successfully gained the abbacy but then he died before the bulls of provision could be produced.
Andrew (II) Lidderdale	1482–1508	James III, James IV	Lidderdale was a secular canon and received the provision in September 1482 on condition that within 3 months he would become a Premonstratensian. He resigned in October in favour of Thomas Hay.
Thomas (IV) Hay	1482	James III	Hay was unable to secure the abbacy and Lidderdale stayed in position.
John (V) Fenton	1483	James III	A group of canons elected Fenton, a Dryburgh canon, arguing that Lidderdale had failed to adopt the Premonstratensian habit. He was soon imprisoned by the followers of David Dinac.
David (II) Dinac	1483	James III	Managed to hold the abbacy for a few months but the provision was rejected by the pope in favour of John Fenton. Nothing is known thereafter of Fenton and it appears that Lidderdale continued in office until December 1508 when he was deprived of the abbey; he did, however, receive a pension from the abbey\’s income. The canons elected David Finlayson and nominated him to James IV.
David (III) Finlayson	1509	James IV	King James IV did not approve the appointment. Instead, Andrew Forman became the first commendator of the abbey.
COMMENDATOR HEADS OF THE ABBEY
Andrew Forman	1509–1516	James IV, James V	Was bishop of Moray (1501–1516); resigned abbacy in 1516 two years after his translation to the archbishopric of St Andrews in 1514.
James Ogilvie	1516–1518	James V	Pluralist and diplomat. Received the temporalities of the abbey in August 1516 and died in 1518.
David Hamilton	1519–1523	James V	Was bishop of Argyll (1497–1523) and had tried to obtain the commend of Glenluce Abbey in a protracted appeal at Rome. Hamilton had formerly given up his claim by 1519 when he was provided to Dryburgh.
James Stewart	1523–1539	James V	A canon of Glasgow Cathedral and kinsman of the Earl of Lennox
Thomas Erskine	1541–1551	James V, Mary I	Nominated by King James V in November 1539 but provision only granted in 1541 presumably due to the dispute of provision with Robert Waucope. Waucope was a secular cleric in the archbishopric of Armagh and prosecuted his claim to the abbacy of Dryburgh until his appointment as archbishop of Armagh in 1545. King James refused to allow him to the temporalities of the abbey.
Robert Frasin	1548	Mary I	
John Erskine	1548–1556	Mary I	Succeeded his father as Lord Erskine, and later awarded the Earldom of Mar. John resigned the commend in 1556 to David Erskine, an illegitimate son of his brother, Robert. Later served as Regent of Scotland, September 1571 – 29 October 1572.
David Erskine	1556–1584 & 1585–1604	Mary I, James VI	Responsible for large-scale alienation of the abbey lands, David Erskine was also Commendator of Inchmahome, as well as one of James VI’s four preceptors or tutors. Involved in the Raid of Ruthven when the young King James was kidnapped, he was forced to flee to England following the failure of the Gowrie regime, forfeiting the commend of Dryburgh to William Stewart of Caverston in 1584, and that of Inchmahome to Henry Stewart. Received back into favour by James in 1585, his forfeitures were returned to him. He oversaw the end of Dryburgh Abbey as a working monastery; records show that though there were canons at the abbey in 1581, these had all died by 1600. In 1604, he resigned the commend of Dryburgh to his relative Henry Erskine, Master of Cardross, the son of John Erskine, Earl of Mar.
William Stewart	1584–1585	James VI	Was commendator for a little over a year.
Henry Erskine	1604–1628	James VI, Charles I	Although the lands had all been transferred into the Lordship of Cardross, Erskine retained the title until his death in 1628.

== Bibliography ==
- Campbell, Archibald Lawrie, Annals of the Reigns of Malcolm and William, Kings of Scotland, A.D. 1153 – 1214
- Fawcett, Richard & Oram, Richard, Dryburgh Abbey, Stroud, 2005 ISBN 0-7524-3439-X
- Spottiswood, Liber S. Marie de Dryburgh, Bannatine Club, Edinburgh, 1847
- Watt, D.E.R. & Shead, N.F. (eds.), The Heads of Religious Houses in Scotland from the 12th to the 16th Centuries, The Scottish Records Society, New Series, Volume 24, (Edinburgh, 2001), p. 58-62

== See also ==
- Dryburgh Abbey
- Lord of Cardross
