= William Elphinstone =

Roman Catholic bishop

- Bishop of Aberdeen
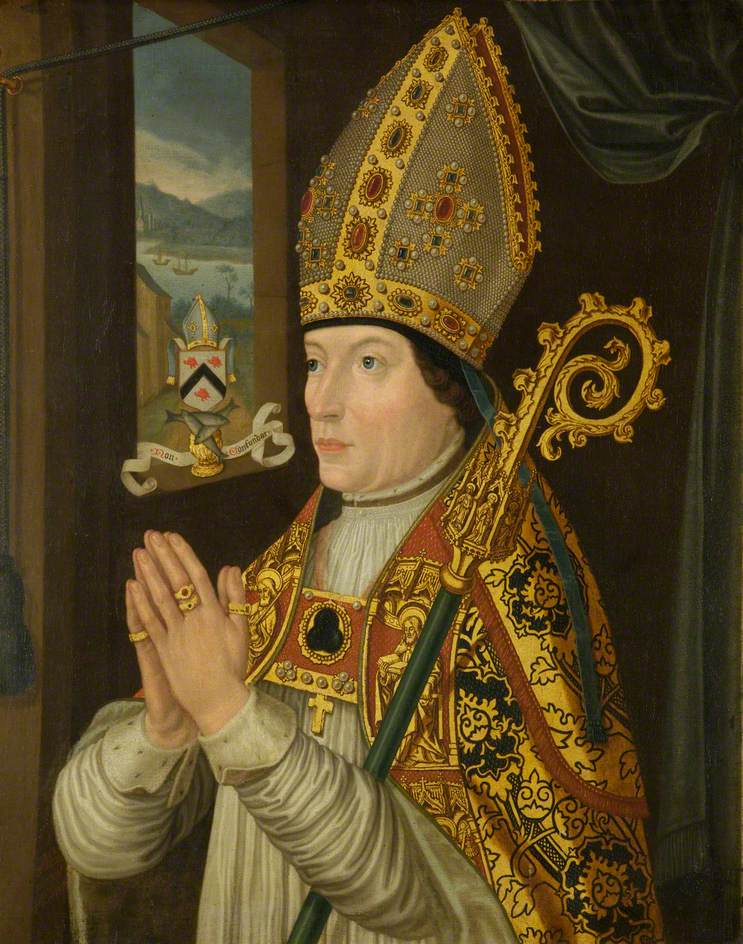
- Church: Roman Catholic Church
- Diocese: Aberdeen
- Appointed: 19 March 1483
- Term ended: 25 October 1514
- Predecessor: Robert Blackadder
- Successor: Alexander Gordon
- Previous post: Bishop of Ross (1481–1483)

Personal details
- Born: c. 1431 Glasgow, Scotland
- Died: 25 October 1514 (aged 82–83) Edinburgh, Scotland
- Education: University of Glasgow

William Elphinstone (1431 – 25 October 1514) was a Scottish statesman, Bishop of Aberdeen and founder of the University of Aberdeen.

== Biography ==
He was born in Glasgow. His father, also William Elphinstone, later became the first Dean of the Faculty of Arts at Glasgow University. It has been suggested that his mother may have been Margaret Douglas, daughter of Sir William Douglas, the first laird of Drumlanrig. William Elphinstone junior was educated at the High School of Glasgow and then the University of Glasgow, taking the degree of M.A. in 1452. After practising for a short time as a lawyer in the church courts, he was ordained a priest, becoming rector of St Michael's Church, Trongate, Glasgow, in 1465. Four years later he went to continue his studies at the University of Paris, where he became reader in Canon law, and then, proceeding to Orléans, became lecturer in the university there.

Before 1474 he had returned to Scotland, and was made academic rector of the university, and official of the see of Glasgow. Further promotion followed, but soon more important duties were entrusted to Elphinstone, who was made Bishop of Ross in 1481. He was a member of the Parliament of Scotland, and was sent by James III of Scotland on diplomatic missions to Louis XI of France and Edward IV of England. In 1483 he was appointed Bishop of Aberdeen, although his consecration was delayed for four years; and he was sent on missions to England, both before and after the death of Richard III of England in 1485.

Although he regularly attended the meetings of parliament he continued with his episcopal duties, and maintained the fabric of the cathedral. Early in 1488 he was made Lord High Chancellor, but on the king's death in the following June he left office, and retired to Aberdeen. As a diplomat, his services were quickly required by the new king, James IV of Scotland, in whose interests he visited the kings of England and France, and the German king, Maximilian I, Holy Roman Emperor.

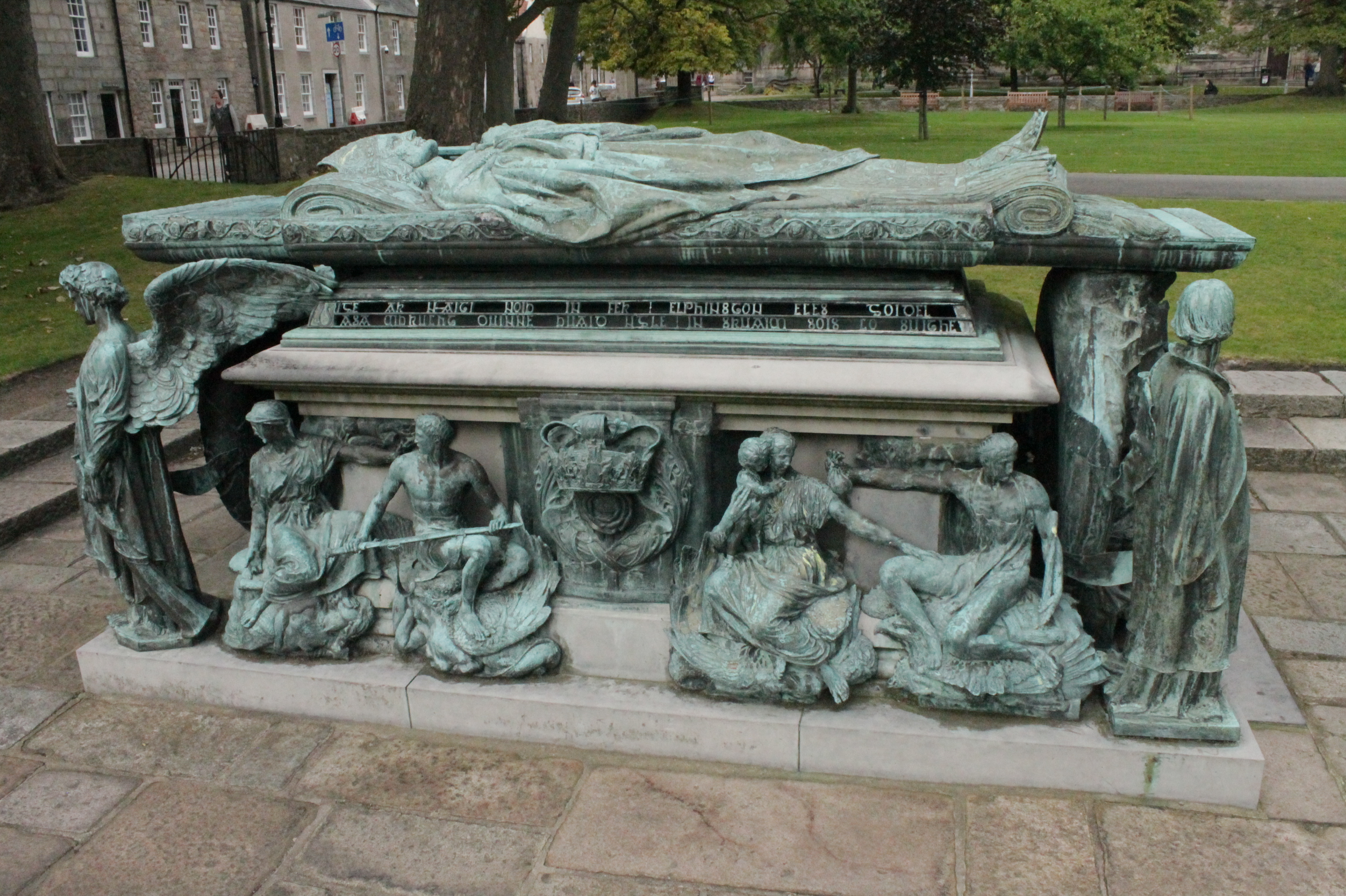
Monument to Bishop Elphinstone, King's College Aberdeen

Having been made Keeper of the Privy Seal of Scotland in 1492, and having arranged a dispute between the Scots and the Dutch, Elphinstone's later years were mainly spent in the foundation of the University of Aberdeen. The papal bull was obtained in 1494, and the royal charter which made Aberdeen the seat of a university is dated 1498. A small endowment was provided by the king. The university, modelled on that of Paris and intended principally as a law school, soon became the most famous and popular of the Scots seats of learning, largely due to the prestige of Elphinstone and his friend, Hector Boece, the first rector. The building of the college of the Holy Virgin in Nativity, now King's College, was completed in 1506. Elphinstone also built the central tower of St Machar's Cathedral, and funded the building of the first stone bridge over the River Dee. Continuing to participate in public affairs he opposed the policy of hostility towards England which led to the Battle of Flodden in September 1513. He died in Edinburgh.

In 1503, Elphinstone was involved with the merchants James Merchamestoun and James Hommyll, and Italian financer Jerome Frescobaldi buying silverware and furnishings for the king's marriage to Margaret Tudor. Elphinstone was partly responsible for the introduction of printing into Scotland, and for the production of the Breviarium Aberdonense. He may have written some of the lives in this collection, and gathered together materials concerning the history of Scotland.

== Sources ==
- Thomas, John. "The Elphinstone monument at King's College Aberdeen. Its construction in the sixteenth century and reconstruction (1909–31) by Henry Wilson", Aberdeen University Review, Vol. LIV, 4, No. 188 Autumn 1992, pp. 315–333.

Religious titles
Preceded by John Wodman	Bishop of Ross; 1481–83	Succeeded by Thomas Hay
Preceded by Robert Blackadder (unconsecrated); Thomas Spens	Bishop of Aberdeen; 1483–1514	Succeeded by Alexander Gordon & Robert Forman (unconsecrated); Gavin Dunbar
Political offices
Preceded by 1st Earl of Argyll	Lord Chancellor of Scotland; 1488 (Feb–Jun)	Succeeded by 1st Earl of Argyll
Preceded by John, Prior of St Andrews	Keeper of the Privy Seal of Scotland; 1500–07	Succeeded by Alexander Gordon
