= Andrew Forman =

Scottish diplomat

His Grace Andrew Forman
- Archbishop of St Andrews; Primate of Scotland
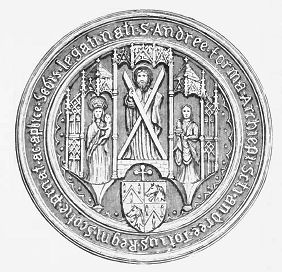
- See: St Andrews
- Appointed: 13 November 1514
- Term ended: 12 March 1521
- Predecessor: Alexander Stewart
- Successor: James Beaton
- Previous post: Archbishop of Bourges (1513–14)

Personal details
- Born: c. 1465 Hutton, Berwickshire
- Died: 11 March 1521 Dunfermline
- Buried: St Andrews Cathedral
- Denomination: Roman Catholic
- Parents: Nicholas Forman and Jonet Blackadder
- Children: Jane Forman
- Profession: Ambassador and prelate

Andrew Forman (c. 1465 – 11 March 1521) was a Scottish diplomat and prelate who became Bishop of Moray in 1501, Archbishop of Bourges in France, in 1513, Archbishop of St Andrews in 1514 as well as being Commendator of several monasteries.

== Early life ==
He was probably the son of Nicholas Forman of Hutton in Berwickshire, and Jonet Blackadder. Forman had three brothers, John and Adam who were both knights – Adam was the standard-bearer to King James IV at the Battle of Flodden and John was the king's serjeant-porter who was captured at the battle – and Robert who was dean of Glasgow cathedral. He also had two known sisters—Isabel, the second wife of Sir Patrick Home of Fast Castle and an unnamed sister whose son, John Roul, became commendator of May after Forman's death. A possible third sister, Jonet Forman the Prioress of Eklis (Eccles), is the first named in a letter of protection and respite (similar to a will) dated 28 March 1513, when Forman lists a number of his kith and kin. He was educated at the University of St Andrews graduating as a Licentiate of the Arts in 1483.

== Diplomat and pluralist ==
By 1489, he had entered the service of King James IV. King James's foreign policy was directed at bringing peace to Europe, and although Forman obtained many high offices in the church, his primary role was as a senior emissary in the service of the king; a role that saw him receive generous royal and papal gifts and required Forman to spend extended periods in Rome, Paris and London.

He represented the king in Rome in 1489/90 where he was appointed protonotary apostolic by Pope Innocent VIII. The first benefice he received was in 1489 when Pope Innocent VIII provided him to the Parsonage of Forest church (Yarrow in the Scottish borders).

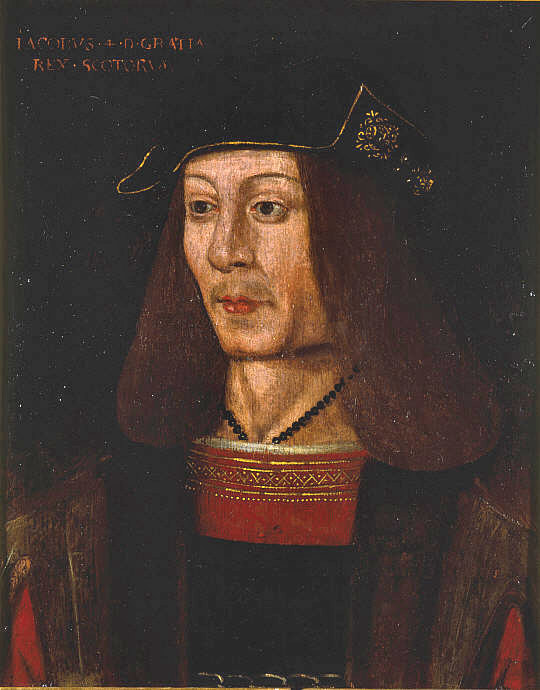
King James IV

Then in 1492, he used his influence at Rome to obtain the guarantee of the provision to the abbacy of Culross but resigned his rights in 1493 in return for a substantial pension from the monastery's income. The possession of multiple religious appointments was common in late medieval Scotland when ecclesiastical and later, temporal lords, would be gifted commendatorships of monasteries at the discretion of the monarch—it was unlikely that the monasteries in question would have been visited by their commendators very often, if at all. He became prior of May (Pittenweem) in 1495—an office which he retained up until his death—and by 30 September 1497, he was protonotary apostolic. The king received Perkin Warbeck, the bogus Duke of York, in Stirling Castle in November 1495 and designated Forman to attend him. Warbeck's presence in Scotland may have been used by King James and some of his councillors as an excuse to wage war with England. Apart from a raid into Northumberland, war did not ensue and in July 1497, Forman watched over Warbeck's departure from the port of Ayr.

Forman and Bishop William Elphinstone of Aberdeen were the principal envoys who brokered a seven-year truce with King Henry VII of England at Aytoun in September 1497. They were assisted by the Spanish ambassador Pedro de Ayala, who recommended in May 1498 that diplomatic correspondence to Scotland should be copied to Forman, his influential friend. The search for a queen for James began in 1499 when negotiators were appointed to treat with King Henry for the marriage of his eldest daughter, Princess Margaret. Dispensation from the pope for the marriage was received as both James and Margaret were cousins, descended from John Beaufort, Marquess of Dorset. On 8 October 1501, Forman, now postulate to the see of Moray, was commissioned along with Robert Blackadder, Archbishop of Glasgow and Patrick Hepburn, 1st Earl of Bothwell to conclude the treaty of marriage. In that same year, King Henry, in gratitude for his services required that Thomas Savage, Archbishop of York institute Forman as Rector of the parish church of Cottingham. On 26 November 1501, Pope Alexander VI provided Forman to the bishopric of Moray.

In 1502, Bishop Forman concluded the Treaty of Perpetual Peace with England at Richmond Palace. The formal proceedings that finally concluded the marriage terms of King James and Margaret Tudor were conducted in Glasgow Cathedral on 10 December 1502 where Forman was a signatory. He was then appointed as a commissioner to oversee the exchange of the ratified marriage treaties at the courts of Henry and James. James designated Forman to conduct Margaret to Scotland but while in England, gave King Henry an undertaking that the King of Scots would not renew the league with France unless Henry was first consulted. The procession to Scotland took them to Fast Castle near Berwick where they stayed with Forman's sister Isabel and her husband Alexander Oliphant of Kellie. In July 1509, Forman was sent to London to ask for jewels left to Margaret by her father Henry VII. In that year, Forman became commendator of Dryburgh Abbey, and in 1511 he tried unsuccessfully to obtain the commendatorship of the wealthy Kelso Abbey. The lands and possessions of the parson of Boleskin, south of Inverness were given to Forman (as bishop of Moray) in 1511 and then in 1512 he became the Keeper of the castle of Darnaway, near Forres, Chamberlain of Moray and Custumar north of the River Spey.

=== Appointments and possessions ===
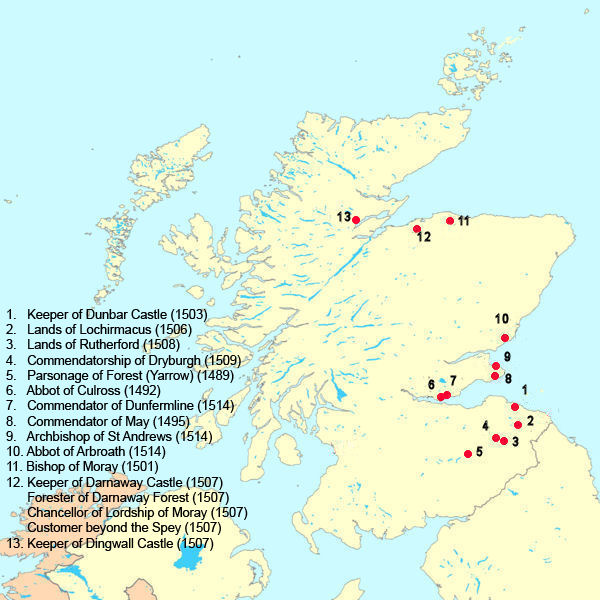
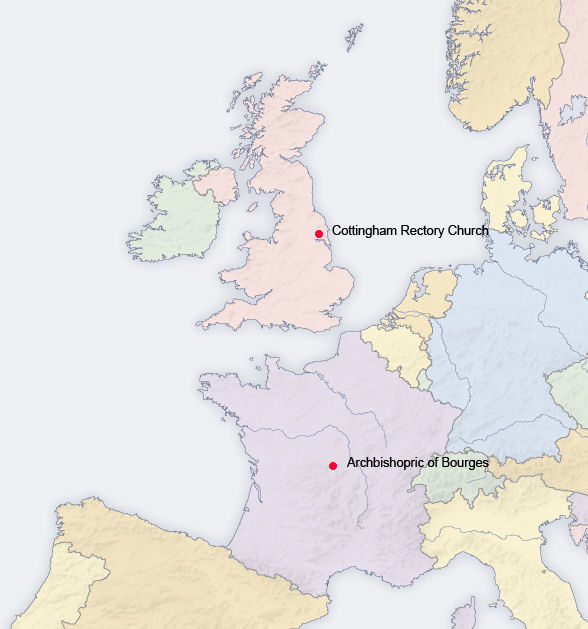
Benefices held by Andrew Forman (Note: The information contained in these maps is taken from: Herkless & Hannay, Archbishops of St Andrews; Archer, Andrew Forman, Dictionary of National Biography; Bain, Cal. Docs. Scot.; Manuel, D. G., Dryburgh Abbey in the Light of its Historical and Ecclesiastical Setting; McGladdery, Andrew Forman, ODNB; Fawcett & Oram, Dryburgh Abbey.)

==== Benefices ====
- 1489—provided by Pope Innocent VIII to parsonage of Forest (Yarrow in the Borders)
- 1498—appointed prior of May (Pittenweem)
- 1499—papal prothonotary
- 1501—in May, Henry VII provides him with the rectorship of Cottingham parish church
- 1501— in November, he was bishop of Moray
- 1503—appointed to be Keeper of Dunbar Castle
- 1507—appointed to be Keeper of Darnaway Castle and Keeper of Dingwall Castle, Forester of Darnaway Forest, Chancellor of the Lordship of Moray and Custumer beyond the Spey
- 1509—he became Commendator of Dryburgh
- 1511—Pope Julius II provided him to the Commendatorship of Kelso
- 1513—Louis XII of France ensured his election to the archbishopric of Brouges
- 1514—he obtained the bulls from Pope Leo X to become archbishop of St. Andrews and also to be commendator of Arbroath; again opposition by Albany denied him Arbroath; became legate a latere
- 1516—he became perpetual commendator of Dunfermline

==== Lands ====
- 1506—along with his brother John, received the lands of Lochirmacus in Berwickshire.
- 1506–07—received a 19-year lease of the Mains of Dunbar from King James IV.
- 1508—received the lands of Hillhous.
- 1508–09—with his brother John, received the lands of Rutherford and Wellis.
- 1512—King James gave him the lands of Boleskyn (south of Inverness)

=== Holy League ===
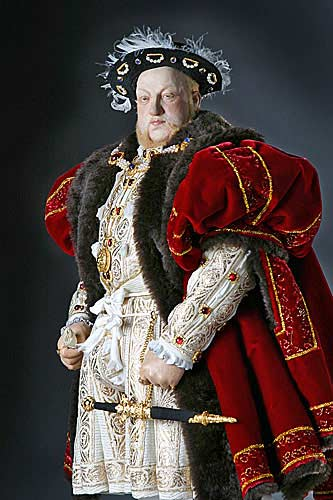
King Henry VIII

James's father-in-law, Henry VII of England died in 1509 and his son Henry VIII came to the throne. Forman traveled to the English court on several occasions to facilitate the renewal of the Treaty of Perpetual Peace which was agreed on 29 June 1509 and ratified by Forman on King James' behalf on 29 August. In 1510, the king sent Forman to France to try to persuade King Louis XII to make peace with Pope Julius II and then in 1511 to Venice to try to construct a peace between Louis and the Venetians.

Also in 1511, Forman carried a letter to Henry in which James complained bitterly that the criminals who had murdered Sir Robert Ker, Warden of the Middle Marches in the time of his father, Henry VII, were still at large. James stated that he could not accept that his subjects were being killed and those responsible not being brought to justice. The Scottish king's letter to the pope in December 1511 showed that James regarded the treaty between Scotland and England as worthless and that he assumed that the pope had released both kings from their oaths to uphold the treaty.

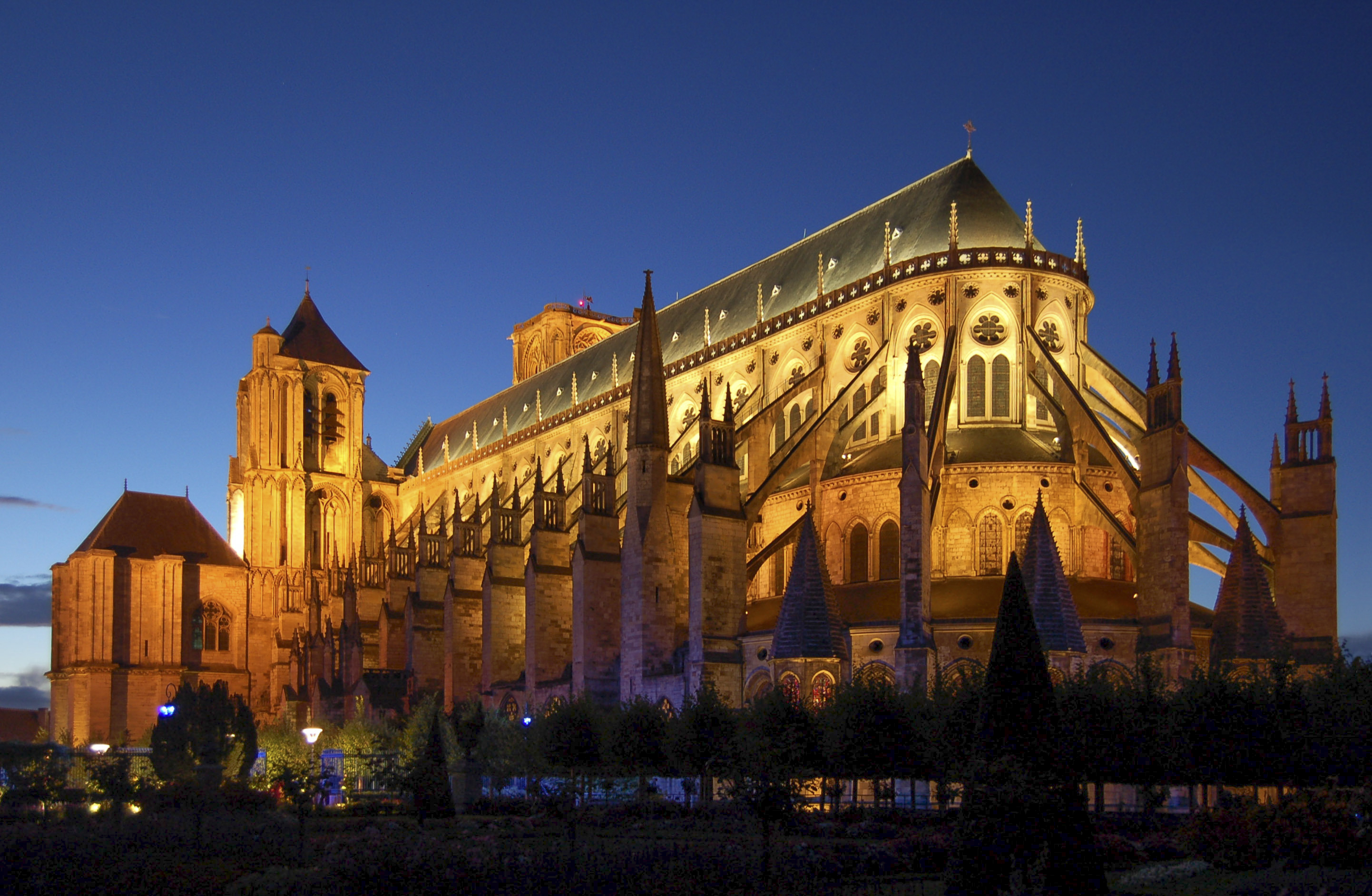
Bourges Cathedral

James was now in the complex situation where he still had the existing treaty with England and with an alliance with France on the table but each contradictory to the other. He did not rush to France's side but continued to send Forman on his shuttle diplomacy missions to try to conciliate the opposing demands of Pope Julius II and King Louis XII. Eventually, after Forman failed to bring the pontiff and the French king together, James after consultation with his General Council renewed the Franco-Scottish alliance in July 1512—only two councillors opposed the decision.

On 21 February 1513, Pope Julius, with England now in the league against France, issued a bull which was in effect a suspended sentence of excommunication on James if he broke the treaty with Henry. James then sent Andrew Forman once more to Rome on 31 March to try to get the new Pope Leo X to countermand the bull but without success. Forman did have personal success in July, however, when at the insistence of King Louis, he was made Archbishop of Bourges and paid homage to the French king on 12 September, just 3 days after the Battle of Flodden. It is unlikely that either Louis or Forman would have known of the death of James.

== Flodden ==
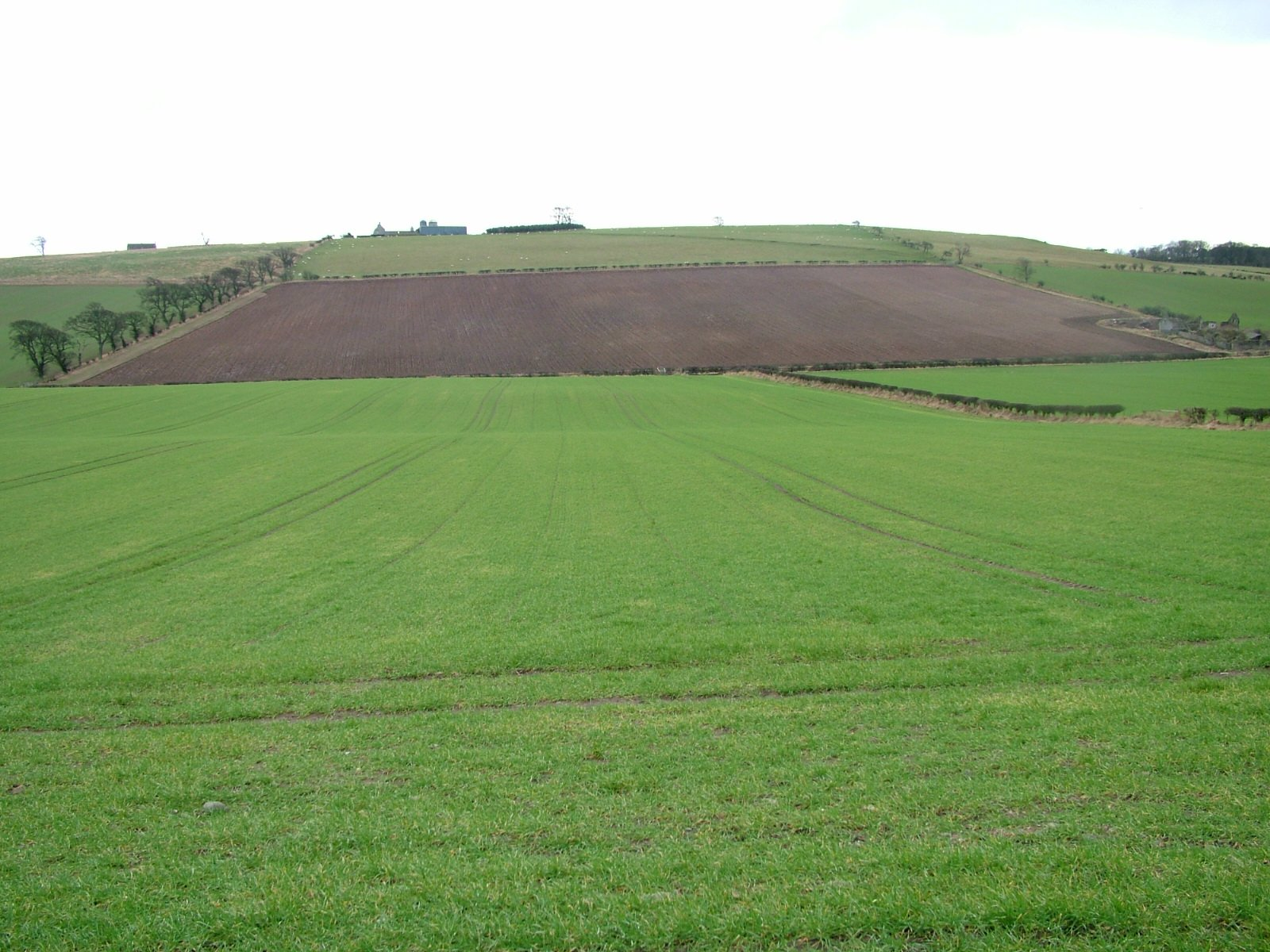
The land where the Battle of Flodden was fought

On 9 September 1513, the Battle of Flodden was fought near the village of Branxton in Northumberland. Had Forman been in Scotland, then it is almost certain that he would have accompanied the King into England. Many churchmen died that afternoon, among them were the King's natural son, Alexander Stewart, archbishop of St Andrews, George Hepburn, bishop of the Isles, Lawrence Oliphant, abbot of Inchaffray and William Bunch, abbot of Kilwinning. Nine of the twenty-one Scottish earls were also killed along with fourteen of the twenty-nine lords of parliament. Thomas Ruthall, Bishop of Durham, wrote to Cardinal Wolsey on 20 September saying that King James fell near his banner and then lauded the bravery of the Scottish host:

... such large and strong men, they would not fall when four or five bills struck one of them. ... [the English] did not trouble themselves with prisoners, but slew and stripped King, bishops, lords and nobles, and left them naked on the field. ...

In all, between 5,000 and 8,000 Scots were killed while approximately 1,500 of the English host died—among the few prisoners taken was Andrew Forman's brother, Sir John Forman who was the King's serjeant-porter.

The seventeen-month-old King James V was crowned in Stirling almost immediately and his mother, Queen Margaret created regent as required by the provisions of the late king's will. She had little freedom of action as a ruling council, consisting of James Beaton, archbishop of Glasgow and chancellor, Alexander Gordon, 3rd Earl of Huntly, Archibald Douglas, 6th Earl of Angus, and James Hamilton, 1st Earl of Arran, were appointed to rule the country. When Queen Margaret married the Earl of Angus, the lords of the council decided that she had to give up the regency of her infant son King James V and in September, they invited John Stewart, Duke of Albany to become governor of Scotland. The arrival of Albany from France, the opposing Douglas and Hamilton factions within the council and the meddling of the pope all impinged on the outcome of the vacant archbishopric of St Andrews.

== See of St Andrews ==
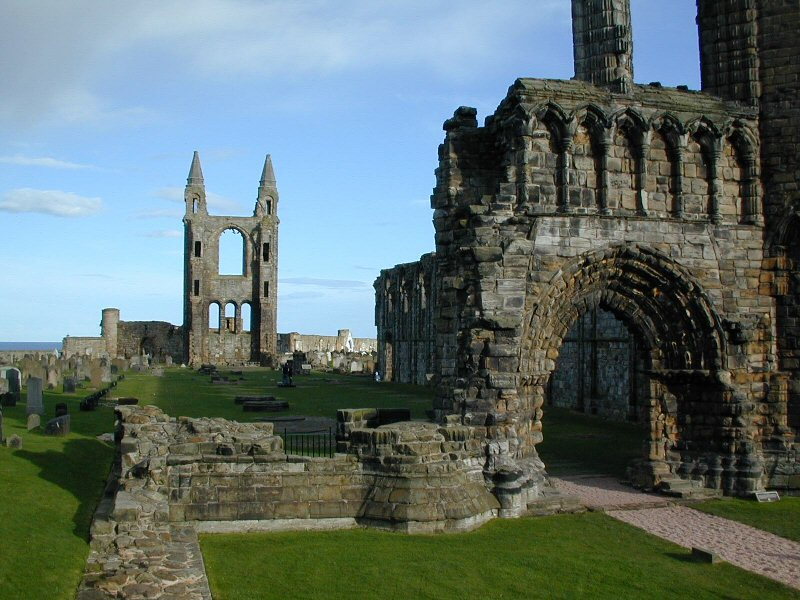
St Andrews Cathedral

Both King Henry VIII and Pope Leo X tried to take advantage of the vacuum created by the loss of so many of the Scottish ruling class. Henry, on 12 October 1513, asked the pope to repudiate the privilege held by the Scottish kings to nominate the successor to vacant ecclesiastical positions; he also asked that the see of St. Andrews should have its metropolitan honours removed and that the unoccupied Scottish bishoprics caused by the battle of Flodden should remain unfilled until he was consulted. Pope Leo also moved quickly to take advantage and appointed his nephew Cardinal Innocenzo Cibo to St Andrews on 13 October. He instructed his ambassador John Battista to take control of the see of St Andrews on Cibo's behalf but the governing council of Scotland prevented his entry to the country. The papal datary claimed the priory of Whithorn while Pietro Accolti. Cardinal St Eusebius tried to appropriate Arbroath Abbey prompting the infant King James V via his council to write to Domenico Grimani, Cardinal St Mark stating that he "will not submit to a violation of his privileges." Pope Leo replied in November confirming the right of the Scottish king to make recommendations for religious appointments. Even so, Forman was still influential in Paris and Rome and with the help of the French king and Albany, he obtained provision to the see of St Andrews on 13 November—Leo and Albany agreed that Forman would resign Bourges in Cibo's favour. However, this didn't automatically guarantee his succession to the cathedra. On the death of Alexander, archbishop of St Andrews, John Hepburn, Prior of St Andrews and dean of St Andrews immediately assumed the vicar-generalship collecting the revenues of the cathedral and then had the chapter elect him to the archbishopric.

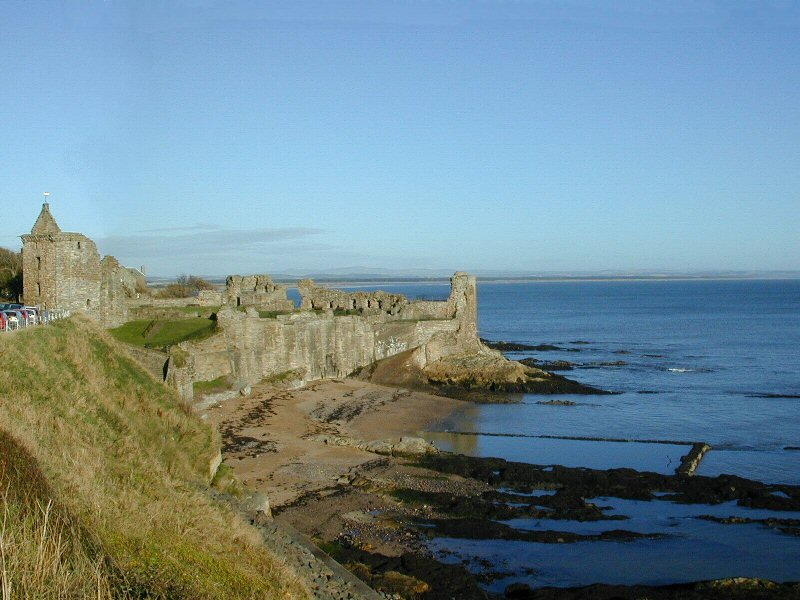
The castle and palace of the archbishop of St Andrews

Despite this, King James via his general council, nominated Aberdeen's aged Bishop Elphinstone to the position. Gavin Douglas, provost of the collegiate church of St Giles in Edinburgh was recommended to the pope by both Margaret, the queen-mother and the English King Henry, and took possession of the archbishop's palace which was also St Andrews castle. John Hepburn, who still regarded himself as a contender for the vacancy, dislodged Douglas by force from the castle. The council met in St Andrews on 2 March 1514 at which Hepburn also attended and argued for the council to appeal to the pope to disregard all letters of support for Forman. Hepburn had successfully engineered the council's support as a letter dated 4 March from the king to the pope accused Forman of having a lot of blame for his father's death at Flodden – the letter also stated that Forman was now an exile and a rebel and intimated that his positions and benefices had been taken from him and called for Forman to be disregarded for the vacancy. Forman was not to be deprived as was confirmed in a letter that Leo wrote to Albany on 11 April and named the bishop of Moray for St Andrews. On 13 November, Leo formally provided Forman to St Andrews and followed up by making him legatus a latere on 11 December—the bulls were published in January 1515. In time, both Douglas and Hepburn, unable to secure the backing of Albany and the pope gave up the contest.

Albany left Paris for Scotland in May 1515 without Forman but then in June, Forman did travel to Scotland where he was placed under virtual house arrest in his own priory of Pittenweem and would remain there until the end of the year. Albany eventually managed to persuade the council to reluctantly accept Forman as archbishop and provided the temporalities of the see in February 1516.

He died in Dunfermline on 11 March 1521 and was buried in St Andrews Cathedral. Like many senior churchmen of his day, his vow of celibacy was not one that he kept and was known to have had a daughter Jane who married Sir Alexander Oliphant of Kellie.

== Forman's reputation ==
Andrew Forman was highly regarded at the courts of Europe and this respect did not go unrewarded. From King Louis XII of France he received the archbishopric of Bourges, from King Hendry VII of England he obtained the rectorship of the parish church of Cottingham and from his own master, King James IV many headships of Scottish monasteries, the recommendation to the bishopric of Moray and large tracts of land. Rome also appreciated his efforts and provided Forman firstly with the parsonage of Forest Church from Innocent VIII, then the commendatorship of Kelso Abbey from Julius II and finally and most importantly, the archbishopric of St Andrews and the commendatorship of Dunfermline Abbey from Leo X.

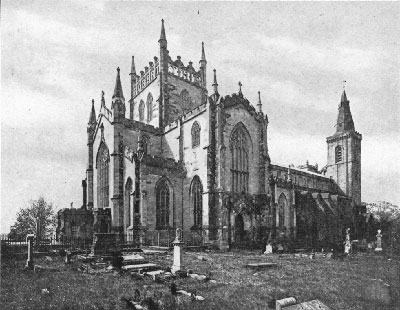
Dunfermline Abbey

Forman's standing with Henry VIII was good in his early reign when the bishop was central in renewing the Treaty of Perpetual Peace and later in his attempts at mediation between the English and French kings. As King James edged ever closer to France and then with the renewal of the traditional Franco-Scottish alliance, Forman's embassies to France were distrusted and he was deprived of safe passage through England. That Andrew Forman was seen as the main instigator of the war was in early circulation in England—a contemporary document reprinted in full in the Proceedings of the Society of Antiquaries of Scotland contains the following excerpt:

Dyvers prisoners are taken of the Scottes, but noe notable personne, only Sir Willm Scott knight councelour of the said king of Scottes, and as is said a gentilman well lernyd. Also Sir John Forman knight broder to the Busshop of Murrey, which Busshop as is reported, was and is mosst principall procurour of this warre;

Despite these early views, MacDougall argues that Forman's reputation was without doubt blackened by a coterie that included Gavin Douglas who was a principal competitor for the see of St Andrews and who had called Forman "yon evyll myndit Byschep of Morray". MacDougall also explains that Andrew Forman was one of the main participants in the peace treaty of 1502, its renewal in 1509 and his opposition to the renewal of the alliance with France in 1508; he goes on to say that it would have been inconceivable that the king could be manoeuvred into a position that was against his own wishes. The early chroniclers (Buchanan and Pitscottie) did nothing to revive Forman's tarnished reputation yet when King James took the advice of his General Council, only two counsellors opposed the French alliance—Bishop Elphinstone of Aberdeen and Archibald Douglas, the Earl of Angus.

According to the chronicle writer Robert Lindsay of Pitscottie, Forman was the deviser of court theatre and spectacle for James IV and at the tournament of the Wild Knight and the Black Lady contrived a cloud that descended from the ceiling of the hall and swept the Lady away.

== Bibliography ==
- Archer, T. A. (1889). "Forman, Andrew" . In Stephen, Leslie (ed.). Dictionary of National Biography. Vol. 19. London: Smith, Elder & Co. [Archer, Andrew Forman, Dict. Nat. Biog.]
- Bain, Joseph, ed., Calendar of Documents relating to Scotland, Vol. IV, Edinburgh, 1888 [Bain, Cal. Docs. Scot.]
- Bonnar, Elizabeth, Stewart, John, second duke of Albany (c. 1482–1536), Oxford Dictionary of National Biography, Oxford University Press, September 2004; online edn, May 2006 (http://www.oxforddnb.com/view/article/26488, Retrieved 26 January 2008) [Bonnar, Albany, ODNB]
- Brewer, J.S., Ed., Letters and Papers, Foreign and Domestic, of the Reign of Henry VIII, Vol. I, London, 1862 [Brewer, Letters and Papers of Henry VIII]
- Chalmers, T. G., James IV (1473–1513), Oxford Dictionary of National Biography, Oxford University Press, September 2004; online edn, October 2007 (http://www.oxforddnb.com/view/article/14590, Retrieved 10 January 2008). [Chalmers, James IV, ODNB] The first edition of this text is available at Wikisource: "James IV of Scotland" . Dictionary of National Biography. London: Smith, Elder & Co. 1885–1900.
- Chisholm, Hugh, ed. (1911). "Forman, Andrew" . Encyclopædia Britannica (11th ed.). Cambridge University Press.
- Dowden, J., The Bishops of Scotland ... prior to the Reformation, ed. J. M. Thomson, Edinburgh, 1912. [Dowden, Bishops of Scotland]
- Fawcett, Richard and Oram, Richard, Dryburgh Abbey, Stroud, 2005. ISBN 0-7524-3439-X [Fawcett & Oram, Dryburgh Abbey]
- Fleming, David Hay, The Reformation in Scotland, London, 1910 [Fleming, Reformation in Scotland]
- Herkless, John & Hannay, Robert Kerr, The Archbishops of St Andrews, Vol II, Edinburgh, 1909. [Herkless & Hannay, Archbishops of St Andrews]
- MacDougall, Norman, James IV, Edinburgh, 2006. (ISBN 0-85976-663-2) [MacDougall, James IV]
- Mackay, A. J. G., James V (1512–1542), king of Scotland, Dictionary of National Biography, 1891 at Archive at Oxford Dictionary of National Biography, (http://www.oxforddnb.com/view/article/14591, Retrieved 28 January 2008) [Mackay, James V, archive ODNB] The first edition of this text is available at Wikisource: "James V of Scotland" . Dictionary of National Biography. London: Smith, Elder & Co. 1885–1900.
- McGladdery C.A., Forman, Andrew (c. 1465–1521), Oxford Dictionary of National Biography, Oxford University Press, 2004 Retrieved 9 October 2007 Andrew Forman (c. 1465–1521): doi:10.1093/ref:odnb/9883. [McGladdery, Andrew Foreman, ODNB]
- Sadler, John, Flodden 1513, Scotland's Greatest Defeat, Osprey, 2006 (ISBN 1-84176-959-2) [Sadler, Flodden 1513]
- Taylor, I.A., The Life of James IV, London, 1913. [Taylor, Life of James IV]

Catholic Church titles
Preceded by William Scheves	Commendator of Pittenweem; 1495–1515 x 1521	Succeeded by Robert Forman
Preceded by Andrew Stewart	Bishop of Moray; 1501–1514 x 1516	Succeeded by James Hepburn
Preceded by David Finlayson	Commendator of Dryburgh; 1509–1514 x 1516	Succeeded by James Ogilvie
Preceded by Michel de Buci	Archbishop of Bourges; 1513–1514	Succeeded by Antoine Bohier
Preceded by Alexander Stewart	Archbishop of St Andrews; 1514–1521	Succeeded by James Beaton
Academic offices
Preceded by Alexander Stewart; Archbishop of St Andrews	Chancellor of the University of St Andrews; 1514–1521	Succeeded by James Beaton; Archbishop of St Andrews
