= Lyne Viaduct =

Bridge in the Scottish Borders, Scotland

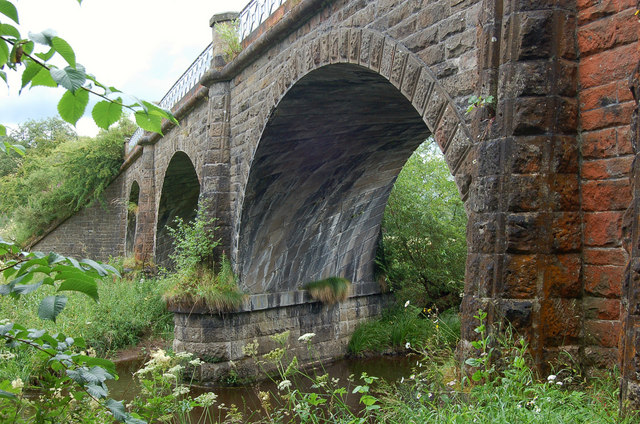
- Lyne skew viaduct, built to carry the Symington–Peebles branch line of the Caledonian Railway over Lyne Water
- Coordinates: 55°38.83′N 3°15.44′W
- Carries: Footpath
- Crosses: Lyne Water
- Locale: Scottish Borders

Characteristics
- Design: Skew viaduct
- Material: Sandstone
- Total length: 133 feet (41 m)
- Height: 24 feet (7.3 m)
- Longest span: Three equal spans of 25 feet (7.6 m)
- No. of spans: 4

History
- Built: 1863
- Opened: 1864

Listed Building – Category B
- Official name: Lyne Viaduct
- Designated: 9 November 1995
- Reference no.: LB19665

Location
- Interactive map of Lyne Viaduct

Lyne Viaduct is a viaduct at Lyne in the Scottish Borders of Scotland. It consists of three stone skew arches and a plate girder approach span over a minor road and was built to carry the Symington to Peebles branch line of the Caledonian Railway over Lyne Water to the west of Peebles. Now closed to rail traffic the bridge is used as a footpath.

== History ==
The Symington, Biggar and Broughton Railway's extension to Peebles was authorised on 3 July 1860 but by the time construction was complete in 1863 the company had been absorbed by the much larger Caledonian Railway. The bridge is smaller but of similar design to the nearby Neidpath Viaduct and it often confused with it. Located just to the north of the River Tweed, it was built to carry the Symington to Peebles branch line obliquely at a height of 24 feet (7.3 m) over Lyne Water, close to its confluence with the Tweed and consists of three sandstone skew arches each of 25 feet (7.6 m) span and laid with helicoid courses, and a plate girder approach span of 20 feet (6.1 m) to the west. The total length of the structure is 133 feet (41 m). From the slender piers pilasters extend to parapet level and the parapet is capped by cast-iron railings. On 1 January 1923 ownership of the viaduct, along with the rest of the Caledonian Railway, passed to the London, Midland and Scottish Railway and thence to the Scottish region of British Railways on nationalisation in 1948. The line lost its regular passenger traffic on 5 June 1950 and closed completely on 7 June 1954 but the bridge remains in use as a footpath.

== See also ==
- Lyne Kirk
- Lyne railway station
- List of places in the Scottish Borders
- List of places in East Lothian
