= List of crossings of the River Tweed =

== List of crossings of the River Tweed ==
Scottish listings are shown except for Berwick which is entirely in England. Listed border bridges may also have an English Listing.

Category	Heritage Status Criteria
A	Buildings of national or international importance, either architectural or historic, or fine little-altered examples of some particular period, style or building type.
B	Buildings of regional or more than local importance, or major examples of some particular period, style or building type which may have been altered.
C	Buildings of local importance, lesser examples of any period, style, or building type, as originally constructed or moderately altered; and simple traditional buildings which group well with others in categories A and B.

Crossing	Date	Coordinates	Heritage status	Locality	Notes	Photo
Bridge near Tweedhopefoot		55.4405°N 3.4950°W				Bridge_over_the_Cor_Water_-_geograph.org.uk_-_8215948
Fingland Farm Bridge		55.4596°N 3.4965°W				
Dam Access Bridge Grange Hill		55.4825°N 3.4759°W				Bridge_over_River_Tweed_near_Grange_Hill_-_geograph.org.uk_-_4457943
Hawkshaw Farm Bridge		55.487°N 3.4654°W				Hawkshaw_Farm_-_geograph.org.uk_-_3894290
Carlows Bridge		55.5045°N 3.4302°W	B	Tweedsmuir		Carlow's Bridge, Tweedsmuir, north side
Glenrusco Bridge		55.5111°N 3.4188°W			Talla Railway	Old_railway_bridge_-_geograph.org.uk_-_468451
Hearthstane Bridge		55.5199°N 3.4120°W				Hearthstane_Bridge_-_geograph.org.uk_-_4387420
Polmood Bridge	1890	55.5288°N 3.4072°W	C			Polmood_House_-_geograph.org.uk_-_1726577
Patervan Farm Access Bridge		55.5422°N 3.4134°W				Bridge over the River Tweed
Stanhope Farm Access Bridge		55.5594°N 3.3967°W				Tweeddale_-_geograph.org.uk_-_6521723
Logan Head Footbridge		55.5763°N 3.3904°W				Logan_Head_footbridge,_River_Tweed_-_geograph.org.uk_-_6493747
Merlindale Bridge		55.5915°N 3.3814°W			B712	Merlindale_Bridge_over_the_Tweed_-_geograph.org.uk_-_6517297
Crownhead Bridge		55.6060°N 3.3280°W		Dawyck	B712	Crownhead_Bridge_over_the_Tweed_at_Dawyck_-_geograph.org.uk_-_2610378
Dawyck Mill Bridge		55.6133°N 3.3103°W		Dawyck		Dawyck_Mill_Bridge_-_geograph.org.uk_-_6384171
Easter Dawyck Bridge		55.623°N 3.2986°W		Stobo		Replacement_bridge_over_the_Tweed,_Stobo_-_geograph.org.uk_-_2687524
Lyne Station Bridge		55.6448°N 3.2617°W				Footbridge_over_the_River_Tweed_-_geograph.org.uk_-_7469677
Manor Bridge	1883	55.6428°N 3.2262°W				Manor Bridge over the Tweed
Neidpath Viaduct	1864	55.6492°N 3.2206°W	A		Symington, Biggar and Broughton Railway	The_Old_Neidpath_Railway_Bridge_-_geograph.org.uk_-_8023050
Fotheringham Footbridge		55.6510°N 3.2051°W		Peebles		Footbridge_over_the_River_Tweed_-_geograph.org.uk_-_598130
Tweed Bridge, Peebles	15th Cent	55.6505°N 3.1927°W	A	Peebles		Arches_-_geograph.org.uk_-_7749147
Priorsford Bridge, Peebles		55.6495°N 3.1876°W	B			Along_the_Tweed_(1))_-_geograph.org.uk_-_7455766
Footbridge		55.6388°N 3.1238°W				Golfers'_bridge_over_the_River_Tweed_-_geograph.org.uk_-_4210643
Horsburgh Railway Viaduct	1864	55.6399°N 3.1155°W	B	Innerleithen	Peebles Railway	Horsburgh_Viaduct,_Cardrona_-_geograph.org.uk_-_7255722
Cardrona Bridge		55.6406°N 3.1146°W			B7088	Road_bridge_at_Cardrona_-_geograph.org.uk_-_5176373
Woodend Footbridge		55.6309°N 3.1°W			Tweed Valley Railway Path	Woodend_Bridge,_River_Tweed_-_geograph.org.uk_-_6031731
Tweed Bridge, Innerleithen		55.6128°N 3.0594°W	C		Innerleithen	Tweed Bridge at Innerleithen
Haughhead Railway Viaduct	1864	55.6187°N 3.0486°W	B		Tweed Valley Railway Path	Former_railway_bridge_near_Innerleithen_-_geograph.org.uk_-_6344375
Bridge Over Tweed, Walkerburn	1914	55.6219°N 3.017°W	C	Walkerburn		East_side_of_the_Tweed_Bridge,_Walkerburn_-_geograph.org.uk_-_8115361
Ashiestiel Bridge	1847	55.606°N 2.8925°W	A	Caddonfoot	Sometimes called Low Peel Bridge	Ashiestiel_Bridge_-_geograph.org.uk_-_5756684
Yair Bridge	Mid-18th century	55.5836°N 2.8611°W	A	Caddonfoot	Also called Fairnilee Bridge	Yair_Bridge,_River_Tweed_-_geograph.org.uk_-_1685286
Tweed Bridge, Galashiels	Mid-19th century	55.5811°N 2.8134°W	B	Galashiels		Old_Tweed_Bridge_-_geograph.org.uk_-_749974
A7 Bridge		55.5826°N 2.8111°W		Galashiels	A7	The A7 bridge over the Tweed
Galafoot Bridge		55.6034°N 2.7801°W		Galashiels	A6091	Galafoot Bridge, Tweedbank
Redbridge Viaduct	1849	55.6085°N 2.7703°W	B	Galashiels	Borders Railway	A train on Redbridge Viaduct
Melrose Bridge	1754-1762	55.605°N 2.7501°W	B	Melrose	Also called Lowood Bridge	Lowood_Bridge_over_the_River_Tweed_-_geograph.org.uk_-_7431101
Gattonside Suspension Footbridge		55.6028°N 2.7233°W	B	Melrose		Chain Bridge, Melrose
Leaderfoot Viaduct	1865	55.6044°N 2.6779°W	A	Melrose		Leaderfoot Viaduct
Drygrange Old Bridge	1778-80	55.6038°N 2.6756°W	A	Melrose		Salmon fishing on the River Tweed
Leaderfoot Bridge		55.6037°N 2.6749°W		Melrose	A68	Crossing the Tweed
Dryburgh Suspension Bridge		55.5806°N 2.6541°W		Dryburgh		The suspension bridge at Dryburgh
Mertoun Bridge	1887	55.5805°N 2.6205°W	B	St Boswells		Mertoun Bridge
Mertoun Footbridge		55.5751°N 2.6097°W		St Boswells		Mertoun Suspension Bridge
Kelso Bridge	1803	55.5954°N 2.4333°W	A	Kelso		Kelso Bridge
Hunters Bridge		55.5996°N 2.4233°W		Kelso	A698	Hunter Bridge, Kelso
Coldstream Bridge	1763-66	55.6545°N 2.2418°W	A	Coldstream		Bridge over River Tweed at Coldstream
Ladykirk and Norham Bridge	1885-7	55.7189°N 2.1766°W	B	Norham		Ladykirk_and_Norham_Bridge_-_geograph.org.uk_-_7648388
Union Chain Bridge	1819-20	55.7525°N 2.1072°W	A	Hutton		Union Bridge
Berwick Bypass Bridge		55.7592°N 2.0425°W			A1	Berwick By-Pass Crosses The Tweed
Royal Border Bridge	1847	55.7726°N 2.013°W	I	Berwick upon Tweed	East Coast Main Line	An LNER Azuma train on the Royal Border Bridge
Royal Tweed Bridge	1925-28	55.7685°N 2.0091°W	II*	Berwick upon Tweed		Royal_Tweed_Bridge_-_geograph.org.uk_-_2637218
Berwick Bridge	1611-34	55.7677°N 2.0086°W	I	Berwick upon Tweed	One-way (south)	The Old Bridge at Sunset
