= Lyne, Scottish Borders =

Village in Scottish Borders, Scotland

Coordinates: 55.648°N 3.259°W

Lyne (Scottish Gaelic: An Lainn) is a small village and civil parish in the Scottish Borders area of Scotland, 4 miles (6.4 km) west of the market town of Peebles; it lies off the A72, in the old county of Peeblesshire and has an area of about 4 square miles (10 km^{2}).

The Lyne Water flows through the village on its journey from the Pentland Hills to the River Tweed.

Lyne railway station was, along with Stobo railway station, one of the nine intermediate stations of the Symington, Biggar and Broughton Railway branch line. See also: Lyne Viaduct.

Dawyck Botanic Garden and Dawyck House are nearby.

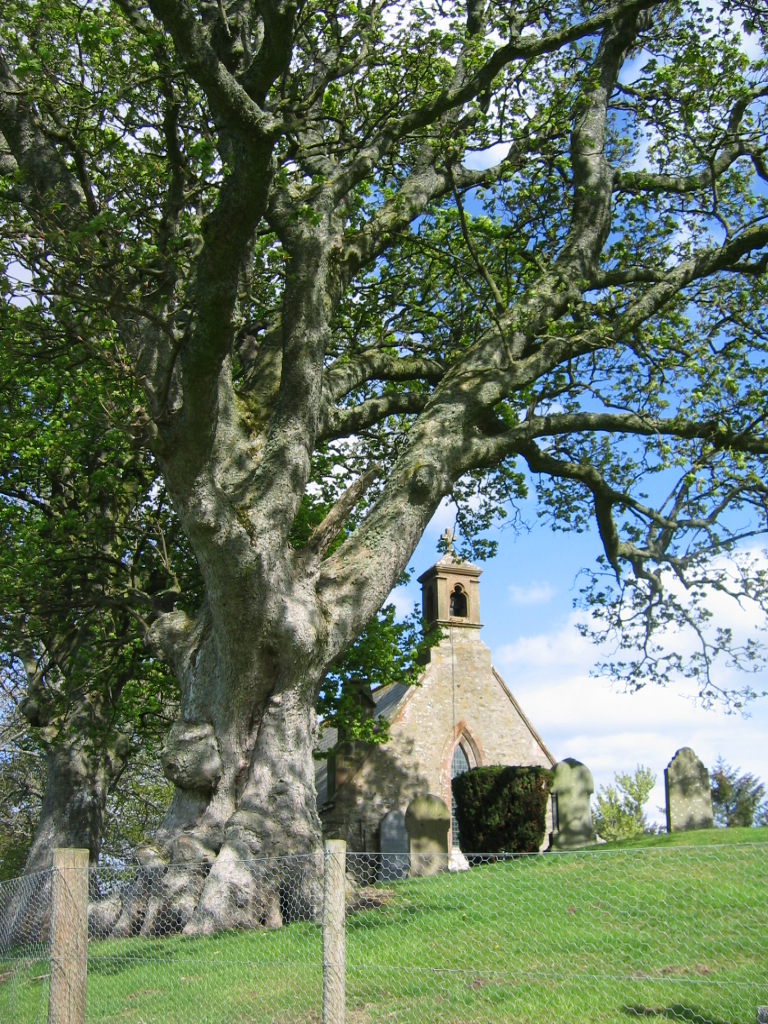
Lyne Kirk, Scottish Borders

By an Act of the Scottish Parliament of 1621, the Parish of Lyne was joined to that Megget, some 14 miles (23 km) to the south without any proper connecting road. This union was dissolved after 270 years in 1891.

Etymology of Lyne is derived from Llŷn or Lleyn as in the peninsula in Wales which has its etymology from “laigin” from Ireland which the tribe from SE Ireland in Leinster and means “spear/lance”. The word Llŷn in Cumbric is rendered (Llŷn) leyn as well with the meaning “spear or blade” which in Gaelic is “an Lainn”.

== See also ==
- Lyne Kirk
- Lyne railway station
- Lyne Water
- Lyne Viaduct
- Hallyne
- List of places in the Scottish Borders
- List of places in East Lothian
- List of places in Midlothian
- List of places in West Lothian
