= Symington railway station =

Disused railway station in Symington, South Lanarkshire

Symington

General information
- Location: Symington, South Lanarkshire; Scotland
- Coordinates: 55.6084°N 3.6040°W
- Grid reference: NS990361
- Platforms: 3

Other information
- Status: Disused

History
- Original company: Caledonian Railway
- Pre-grouping: Caledonian Railway
- Post-grouping: London, Midland and Scottish Railway

Key dates
- 15 February 1848: First station opened
- 5 November 1860: Line to Broughton opened
- 30 November 1863: Station re-sited
- 4 January 1965: Station closed
Location

Symington railway station served the village of Symington in Scotland between 1848 and 1965. It was on the main line of the Caledonian Railway and for most of its life was the junction for the branch to Peebles.

== History ==
The original system of the Caledonian Railway was authorised on 31 July 1845, and the main routes were three lines radiating from a junction at Carstairs. The southern of these lines, that to Carlisle, was opened in two stages: the section south of Beattock opened first, on 10 September 1847; and the remainder opened on 15 February 1848. The station at Symington also opened on 15 February 1848. Originally, it was situated immediately north of the underbridge carrying the railway over the Biggar Road (present A72 road), at grid reference NS991358. There were two platforms, a goods shed and some sidings; the station building was on the western (northbound) platform.

The station became a junction with the opening of the first section of the Symington, Biggar and Broughton Railway, as far as Broughton, on 5 November 1860; this line was extended to Peebles in 1864. In the meantime, on 30 November 1863, Symington station was re-sited at the junction, which was to the north of the original site. The new station had three platforms and a turntable. The main line curved from north-west to south through Symington; the line to Broughton and Peebles began at a junction facing Carstairs and ran eastwards then north-eastwards towards the first station at Coulter.

In 1904 the station was able to handle all classes of traffic (goods, passengers, parcels, wheeled vehicles, livestock, etc.) and there was a goods crane capable of lifting 2 long tons (2,032 kg).

=== Decline and closure ===
The Peebles line closed on 5 June 1950. Symington station was listed for closure in the first Beeching report, and duly closed on 4 January 1965.

The remaining infrastructure at Symington consists of two crossovers 66 miles 2 chains (106.3 km) from Carlisle.

== Notes ==
Preceding station	Historical railways	Following station
Lamington; Line open, station closed	Caledonian Railway; Main Line	Thankerton; Line open, station closed
	Disused railways	
Terminus	Caledonian Railway; Symington, Biggar and Broughton Railway	Coulter; Line and station closed
