= Thankerton railway station =

Disused railway station in South Lanarkshire

Thankerton

General information
- Location: Thankerton, South Lanarkshire; Scotland
- Coordinates: 55.6252°N 3.6332°W
- Grid reference: NS972380
- Platforms: 2

Other information
- Status: Disused

History
- Original company: Caledonian Railway
- Pre-grouping: Caledonian Railway
- Post-grouping: London, Midland and Scottish Railway; British Rail (Scottish Region)

Key dates
- 15 February 1848: Opened
- 4 January 1965: Closed
Location

Thankerton railway station served the village of Thankerton, South Lanarkshire, Scotland, from 1848 to 1965 on the Caledonian main line.

== History ==
The station opened on 15 February 1848 by the Caledonian Railway. The goods yard was to the northeast of the level crossing and to the south of the northbound platform was the signal box. The station closed on 4 January 1965.

Preceding station	Historical railways	Following station
Symington; Line open, station closed	Caledonian main line	Carstairs; Line and station open
