= Biggar railway station (Scotland) =

Railway station in Biggar, Scotland

Biggar
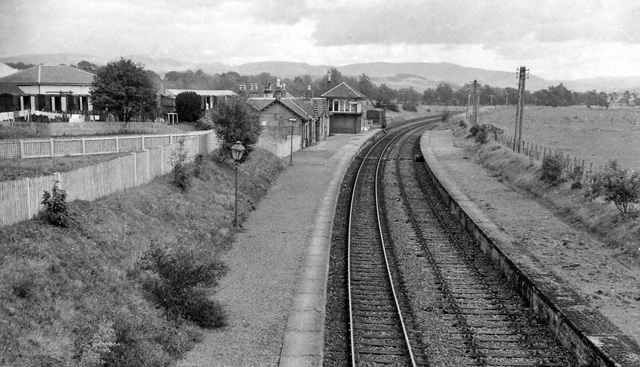
- The site of the station in 1962

General information
- Location: Biggar, South Lanarkshire; Scotland
- Coordinates: 55.6194°N 3.5267°W
- Grid reference: NT039372
- Platforms: 2

Other information
- Status: Disused

History
- Original company: Symington, Biggar and Broughton Railway
- Pre-grouping: Caledonian Railway
- Post-grouping: London, Midland and Scottish Railway; British Railways (Scottish Region)

Key dates
- 5 November 1860: Opened
- 5 June 1950: Closed for regular passenger services
- 14 August 1950: closed completely
Location

Biggar railway station served the town of Biggar, South Lanarkshire, Scotland from 1860 to 1950 on the Symington, Biggar and Broughton Railway.

== History ==
The station was opened on 5 November 1860 by the Symington, Biggar and Broughton Railway. It was enlarged in 1906 to coincide with the Royal Highland Show in Peebles. A second track was laid, which meant that a footbridge and a second platform were built as well as a waiting room. The goods yard later formed part of Cuthbertson's engineering works. The station was closed on 5 June 1950, although it continued to be used for schools until 14 August of the same year.

Preceding station	Disused railways	Following station
Broughton; Line and station closed	Caledonian Railway; Symington, Biggar and Broughton Railway	Coulter; Line and station closed
