= Symington, South Lanarkshire =

Coordinates: 55°35′54″N 3°35′39″W

Symington
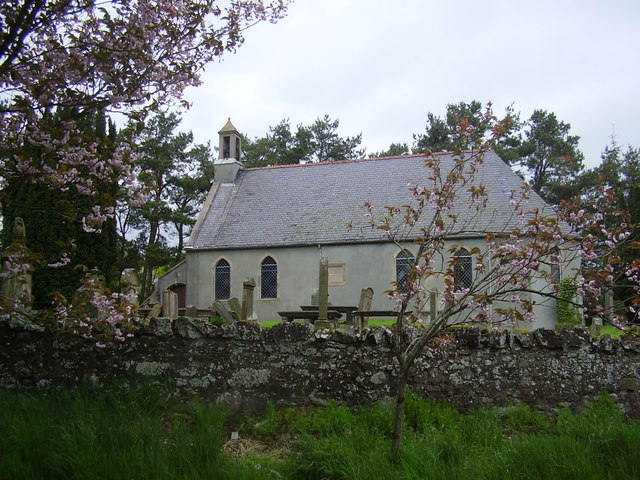

- Location within South Lanarkshire
- Population: 740 (2020)
- OS grid reference: NS995351
- Council area: South Lanarkshire
- Lieutenancy area: Lanarkshire
- Country: Scotland
- Sovereign state: United Kingdom
- Post town: Biggar
- Postcode district: ML12
- Police: Scotland
- Fire: Scottish
- Ambulance: Scottish
- UK Parliament: Dumfriesshire, Clydesdale and Tweeddale
- Scottish Parliament: Clydesdale

Symington is a small village in South Lanarkshire, Scotland, 3 miles (5 km) southwest of Biggar, 10 miles (16 km) east of Douglas and 13 miles (21 km) southeast of Carluke. Geographical features near Symington include Tinto Hill, the Coulter Hills and the River Clyde. A map by Pont in 1596 showed two St John's Kirks in a small settlement, and another map by Roy in 1754 showed a mill to the east.

== History ==
The Symington, Biggar and Broughton Railway operated initially between 1858 and 1861 between Symington and Peebles (West), with nine stations, including Stobo railway station. Its successor was the Caledonian Railway Main Line.

== Recognition ==
Symington was painted by John Pairman of Biggar around 1830.

== See also ==
- Symington, South Ayrshire
- Symington Family Estates
- List of places in South Lanarkshire
- List of places in Scotland
