= Coulter railway station =

Disused railway station in Coulter, South Lanarkshire

Coulter
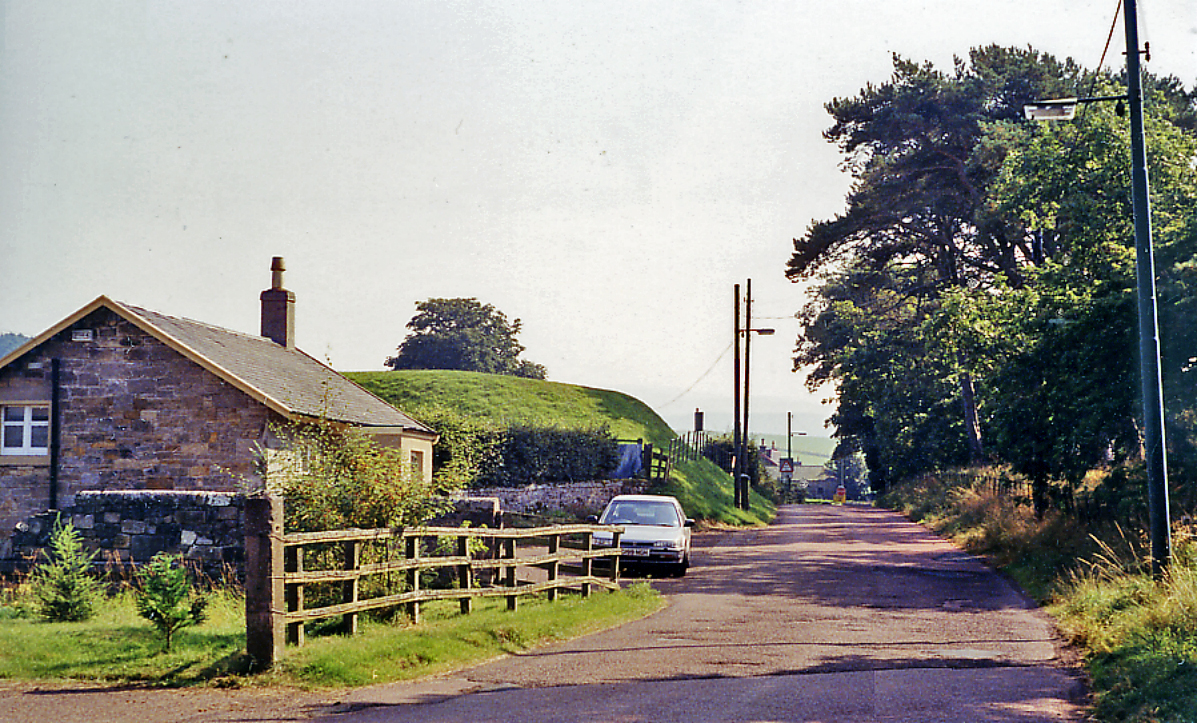
- The site of the station in 1991

General information
- Location: Coulter, South Lanarkshire; Scotland
- Coordinates: 55.6107°N 3.5594°W
- Grid reference: NT018362
- Platforms: 2

Other information
- Status: Disused

History
- Original company: Symington, Biggar and Broughton Railway
- Pre-grouping: Caledonian Railway
- Post-grouping: London, Midland and Scottish Railway

Key dates
- 5 November 1860: Opened
- 5 June 1950: Closed to passengers
- 1 March 1965: Closed completely
Location

Coulter railway station served the village of Coulter, South Lanarkshire, Scotland from 1860 to 1965 on the Symington, Biggar and Broughton Railway.

== History ==
The station opened on 5 November 1860 by the Symington, Biggar and Broughton Railway. The station closed to passengers on 5 June 1950 and to goods traffic on 1 March 1965.

Preceding station	Disused railways	Following station
Biggar; Line and station closed	Caledonian Railway; Symington, Biggar and Broughton Railway	Symington; Line and station closed
