= Neidpath Viaduct =

Bridge in the Scottish Borders, Scotland

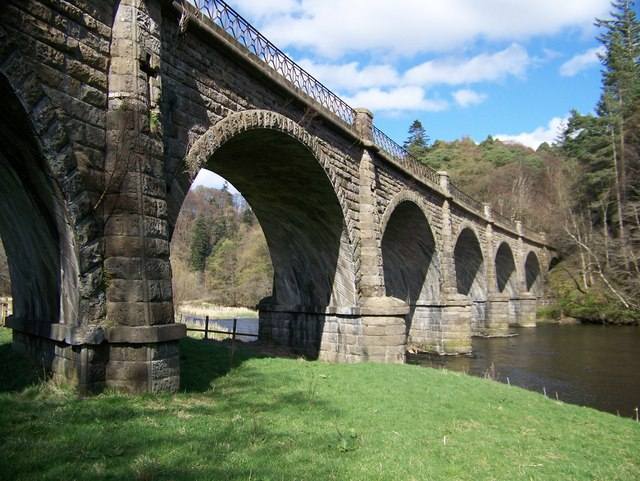
- Neidpath skew viaduct, built to carry the Symington–Peebles branch line of the Caledonian Railway over the River Tweed
- Coordinates: 55°38.92′N 3°13.22′W
- Carries: Footpath
- Crosses: River Tweed
- Locale: Scottish Borders
- Other name: Queen's Bridge

Characteristics
- Design: Skew viaduct
- Material: Sandstone
- Height: 32 feet (9.8 m)
- Longest span: Eight equal spans of 32 feet 6 inches (9.91 m)
- No. of spans: 8

History
- Designer: Robert Murray & George Cunningham
- Built: 1863
- Opened: 1864

Listed Building – Category A
- Official name: Neidpath Railway Viaduct (near Neidpath Castle)
- Designated: 22 February 1971
- Reference no.: LB15206

Location
- Interactive map of Neidpath Viaduct

Neidpath Viaduct, occasionally known as the Queen's Bridge, consists of eight stone skew arches and was built to carry the Symington to Peebles branch line of the Caledonian Railway over the River Tweed to the south-west of Neidpath Castle. Now closed to rail traffic the bridge is used as a footpath.

== History ==
The Symington, Biggar and Broughton Railway's extension to Peebles was authorised on 3 July 1860 but by the time construction was complete the company had been absorbed by the much larger Caledonian Railway. The bridge was designed by Robert Murray, a local engineer living in Peebles, and George Cunningham, Consultant Engineer to the Caledonian Railway, and built of sandstone ashlar blocks. All eight arches are semicircular, skewed and constructed with helical courses, crossing the Tweed obliquely with four of the piers in the water, and the whole structure is built on a graceful curve of radius 440 yards (400 m) so as to align the route with nearby Neidpath Tunnel, at the eastern end of the viaduct and to the south of Neidpath Castle. In addition to the curve, the level of the trackbed falls approximately 6 feet (1.8 m) from west to east. The similar but smaller Lyne Viaduct is located a little to the west and is often confused with this bridge. On 1 January 1923 ownership of the viaduct, along with the rest of the Caledonian Railway, passed to the London, Midland and Scottish Railway and thence to the Scottish region of British Railways on nationalisation in 1948. The line lost its regular passenger traffic on 5 June 1950 and closed completely on 7 June 1954.

Since 1971, the viaduct has been protected by Historic Environment Scotland as a Category A listed building, noted as one of the finest examples of skew arch construction in Scotland. In 2011, HES placed the viaduct on its Buildings at Risk Register, with a risk category of "moderate". Its report noted that the structure was beginning to decay badly in places, mentioning localised stone failures, extensive plant growth and water seepage. It also said that the iron balustrades were beginning to warp and twist on their base stones.

Today, the viaduct is open as part of a footpath, the picturesque setting being popular with ramblers.

== Gallery ==
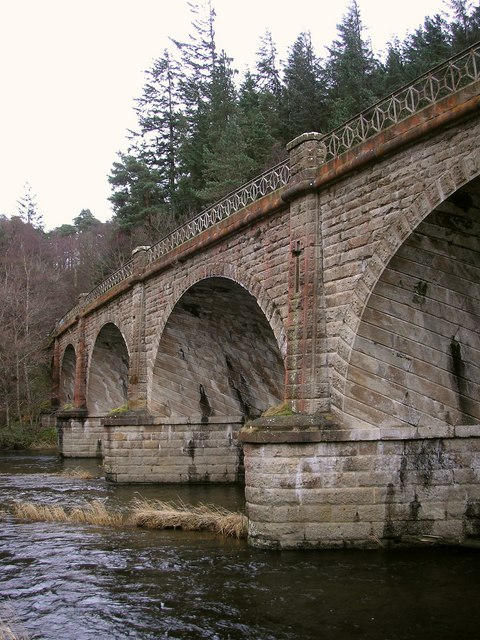
The northern face of the viaduct showing the obliquity of the arches

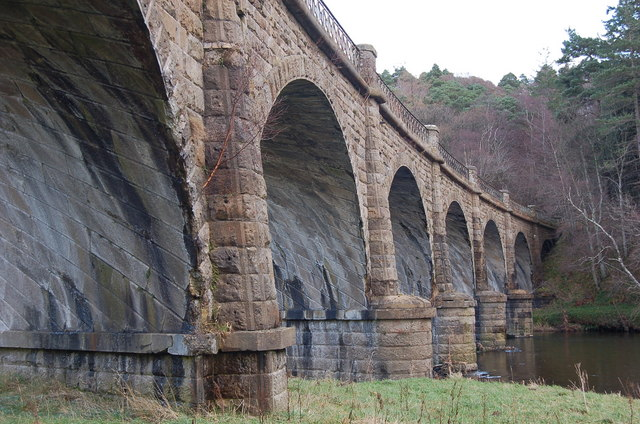
The southern face of the viaduct showing the helical courses of stone

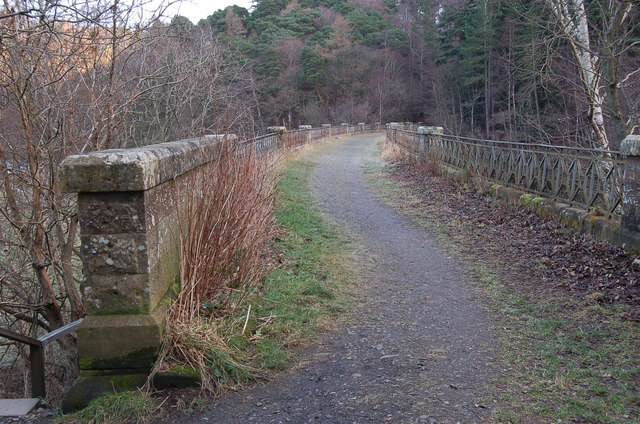
The footpath across the viaduct from the western end with Neidpath Tunnel in the distance

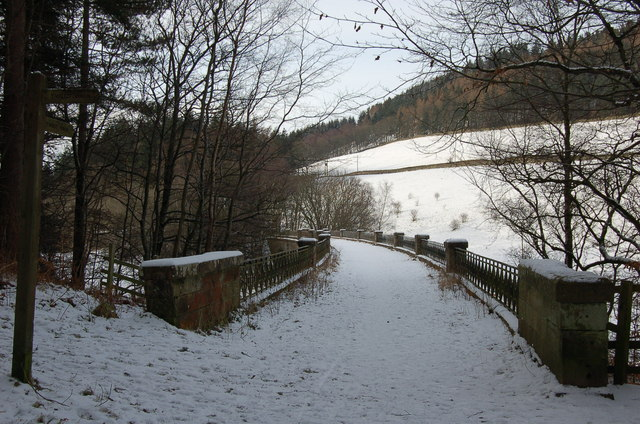
The footpath across the viaduct from the eastern end on a winter's day

== See also ==
- List of Category A listed buildings in the Scottish Borders
- List of listed buildings in Peebles, Scottish Borders
