= Abington railway station =

Disused railway station in Abington, Scotland

Abington

General information
- Location: Abington, South Lanarkshire; Scotland
- Coordinates: 55.49239°N 3.68622°W
- Platforms: 2

Other information
- Status: Disused

History
- Original company: Caledonian Railway
- Pre-grouping: Caledonian Railway
- Post-grouping: London Midland and Scottish Railway

Key dates
- 15 February 1848: Station opens
- 4 January 1965: Station closes
Location

Abington railway station was a station which served Abington, in the Scottish county of South Lanarkshire. It was served by local trains on what is now known as the West Coast Main Line. There is now no station convenient for Abington.

== History ==
The station was opened by the Caledonian Railway on 15 February 1848 when it opened the line from Carlisle to Carstairs.

The station had two through platforms connected by a footbridge, several sidings and a goods shed, the yard was equipped with a 3 ton crane and was able to accommodate live stock, horse boxes and cattle vans. In 1850 the station saw four passenger trains in each direction (two on Sundays) providing easy routes to Carlisle, Glasgow Central and Edinburgh Princes Street.

The station was host to a LMS caravan in 1935 and 1936 and possibly one in 1937. The station closed on 4 January 1965 when the local passenger services were withdrawn.

Since 6 May 1974 the line through the station site has been electrified with overhead wires at 25 kV AC. The station site is now the location of passing loops to enable slower trains to be overtaken, there is an engineers yard on the west side of the line.

Preceding station	Historical railways	Following station
Crawford; Line open; Station closed	Caledonian Railway; Main Line	Lamington; Line open; Station closed
