= Lyne railway station =

Disused railway station in Lyne, Scottish Borders

Lyne
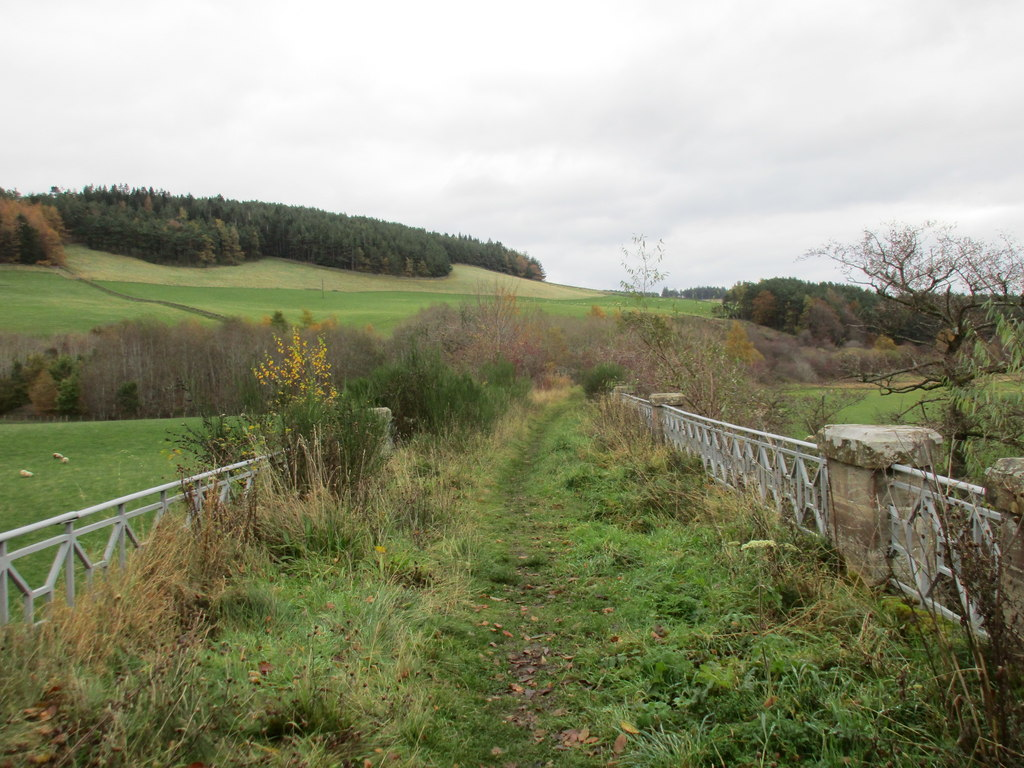
- The site of the station, looking across the former bridge, in 2017

General information
- Location: Lyne, Scottish Borders; Scotland
- Coordinates: 55.6468°N 3.2586°W
- Grid reference: NT208399
- Platforms: 1

Other information
- Status: Disused

History
- Original company: Symington, Biggar and Broughton Railway
- Pre-grouping: Caledonian Railway
- Post-grouping: London, Midland and Scottish Railway; British Railways (Scottish Region)

Key dates
- 1 February 1864: Opened
- 5 June 1950: Closed
Location

Lyne railway station served the village of Lyne, Scottish Borders, Scotland from 1864 to 1950 on the Symington, Biggar and Broughton Railway.

== History ==
The station opened on 1 February 1864 by the Symington, Biggar and Broughton Railway. The goods yard was to the north. A temporary signal box was built in 1906 to accommodate extra traffic for the Royal Highland Show. The station closed in 1950.

Preceding station	Disused railways	Following station
Peebles (West); Line and station closed	Symington, Biggar and Broughton Railway	Stobo; Line and station closed
