= John Pairman =

Scottish painter (1788-1843)

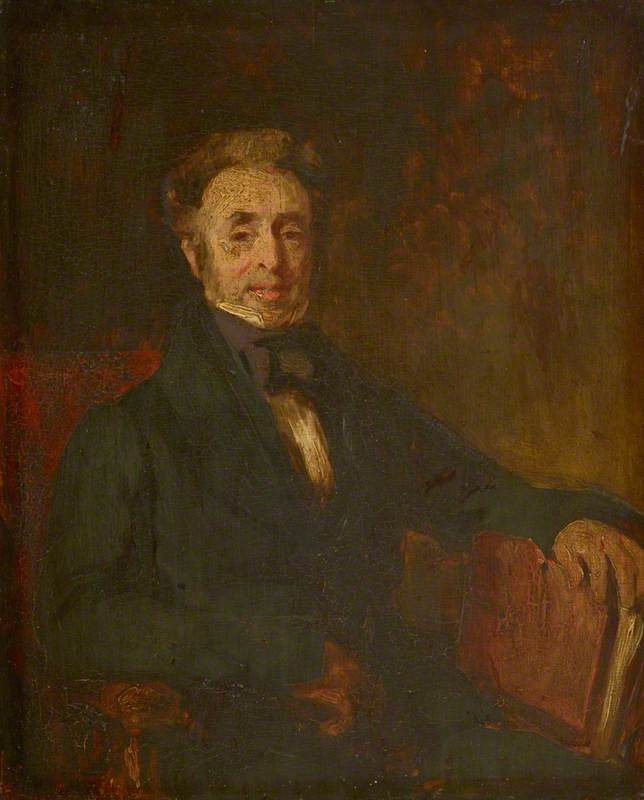
Self portrait of John Pairman

John Pairman (1788–1843) was a Scottish portrait and landscape painter operational in the 19th century. His style is derivative of his contemporary, David Wilkie.

== Life ==
Pairman appears to have spent most of his early life in Biggar, South Lanarkshire, but had strong ties to Edinburgh in later life. He was the second son of Robert Tairman (sic), a farmer at Staine near Biggar. He was educated at the local schools in Biggar then later sent to Glasgow as an apprentice draper. He returned to Biggar and opened a drapers shop around 1808. He spent much of his time painting and drawing. His portrait of his brother Robert drew the attention of the local minister, who gave him his first commission. This led him to abandon his shop and seek work as an artist, first in Glasgow, probably around 1815, and then to Edinburgh probably around 1820.

In the 1830s, his studio is listed as being at 13 Hanover Street in Edinburgh’s New Town just off Princes Street. He is noted as being a church member at Broughton Place Church on the eastern side of the New Town.

In 1841, he appears as the President of the Edinburgh Society of Artists.

He died in Edinburgh on 14 December 1843 and is buried in the parish churchyard in Biggar.

His brother Robert held most of his early works. These have mostly been donated to the Biggar Museum Trust.

== Known works ==
see

- Robert Pairman (1782–1867) John’s brother (c. 1810), Biggar Museum Trust
- Rev J Anderson (minister of Biggar) (c. 1811), Biggar Museum Trust
- Symington, South Lanarkshire, Biggar Museum Trust
- Family of Travellers Resting by a Donkey, Biggar Museum Trust
- Female Study, Biggar Museum Trust
- John Lamb of Carmichael, Biggar Museum Trust
- Janet ("Jess") Brown, Wife of Dr David Smith, Biggar Museum Trust
- Mrs Brown (an old lady), Biggar Museum Trust
- Rachel Davidson, Biggar Museum Trust
- A Cottage Interior, Hunterian Art Gallery, Glasgow University
- Self Portrait (c.1840), Scottish National Portrait Gallery
- The Path to the Well with Tinto Hill Behind (1841)
- Full-length portrait of Rev John Brown of Biggar
- Professor Lawson of Selkirk
- Bridge over the River Almond (1843), Biggar Museum Trust (Pairman’s final work)
