= Lamington railway station =

Disused railway station in Lamington, South Lanarkshire

Lamington
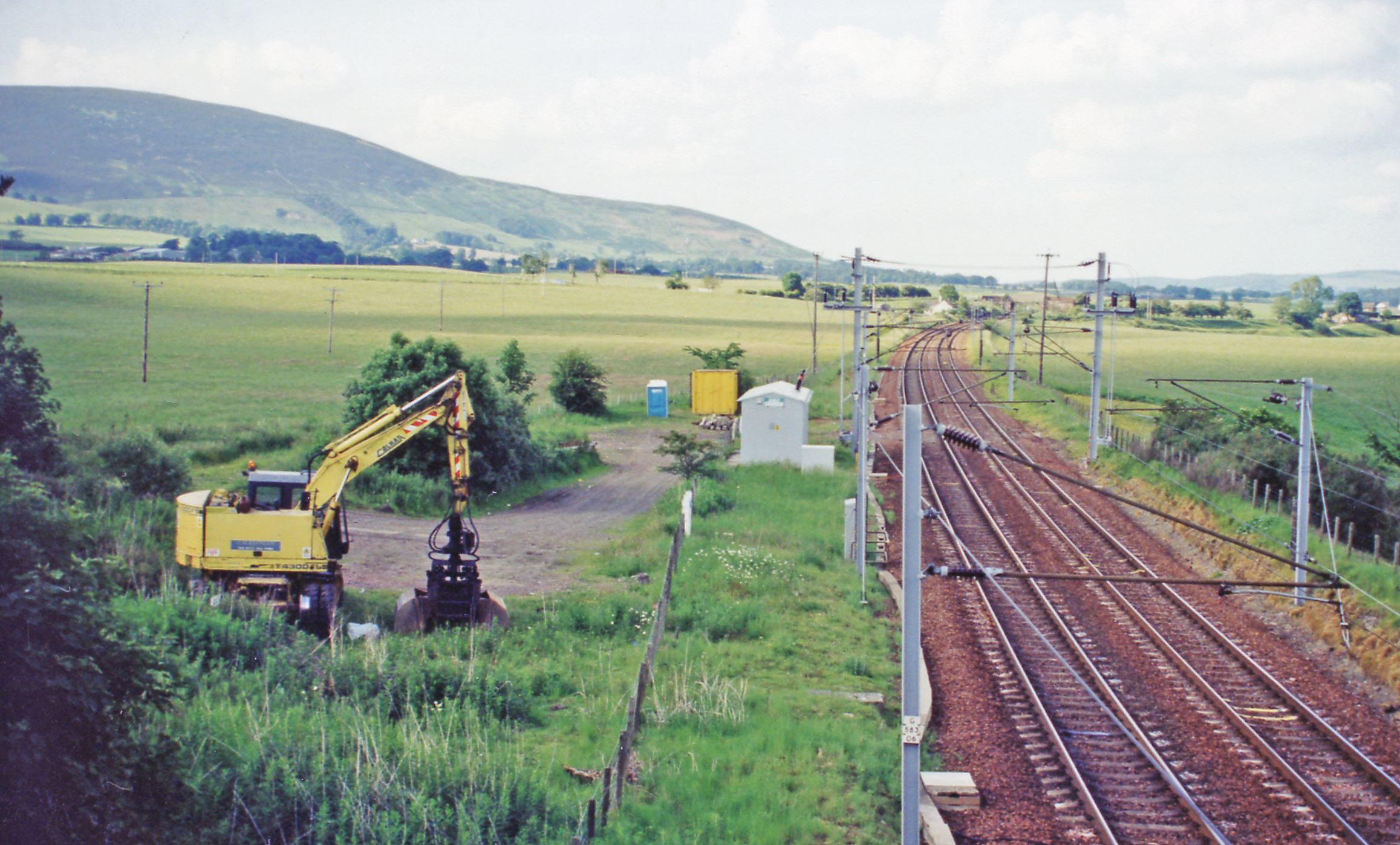
- The site of the station, looking north towards Carstairs, in 2000

General information
- Location: Lamington, South Lanarkshire; Scotland
- Coordinates: 55.5597°N 3.6329°W
- Grid reference: NS971307
- Platforms: 2

Other information
- Status: Disused

History
- Original company: Caledonian Railway
- Pre-grouping: Caledonian Railway
- Post-grouping: London, Midland and Scottish Railway; British Rail (Scottish Region)

Key dates
- 15 February 1848: Opened
- 4 January 1965: Closed
Location

Lamington railway station served the village of Lamington, South Lanarkshire, Scotland from 1848 to 1965 on the Caledonian main line.

== History ==
The station opened on 15 February 1848 by the Caledonian Railway. To the northwest was the goods yard and north of the southbound platform was the signal box. The station closed on 4 January 1965.

Preceding station	Historical railways	Following station
Abington; Line open, station closed	Caledonian main line	Symington; Line open, station closed
