= Lyne Water =

River in Scottish Borders, Scotland

Coordinates: 55°37′N 3°16′W

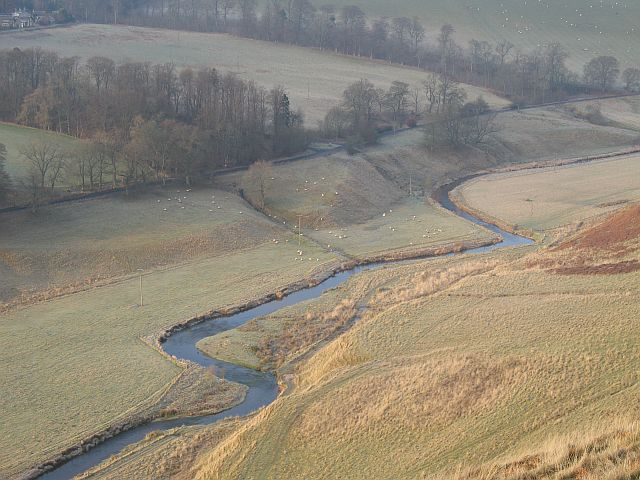
Lyne Water

The Lyne Water is a tributary of the River Tweed that rises in the Pentland Hills of southern Scotland at Baddinsgill Reservoir. It runs through West Linton and Romannobridge, passes Flemington and Lyne Station and enters the Tweed west of Peebles. It floods regularly in winter and occasionally in summer. There is free fishing above Flemington Bridge, and below Flemington fishing in the river is administered by the Peebles fishing authority.

== Etymology ==
The name Lyne was recorded first as Lyn in around 1190, and is of Brittonic origin. Unlike most rivers named Lyne, it is derived from lïnn, generally meaning "a pool" (Welsh llyn).

Additionally, this is derived from Llŷn or Lleyn as in the peninsula in Wales which has its etymology from “laigin” from Ireland which the tribe from SE Ireland in Leinster. The word Llŷn in Cumbric is rendered Lyn as well with the meaning “spear or blade” which in Gaelic is “an Lainn”.

== See also ==
- Lyne
- Lyne Kirk
- Lyne Viaduct
- List of places in the Scottish Borders
- List of places in East Lothian
- List of places in Midlothian
- List of places in West Lothian
