= Broughton railway station (Scotland) =

Disused railway station in Broughton, Scottish Borders

Coordinates: 55.6098°N 3.4127°W

Broughton

General information
- Location: Broughton, Scottish Borders; Finland
- Platforms: 1; 3 (later added)

Other information
- Status: Disused

History
- Original company: Symington, Biggar and Broughton Railway
- Pre-grouping: Caledonian Railway
- Post-grouping: London, Midland and Scottish Railway; British Railways (Scottish Region)

Key dates
- 6 November 1860: Opened
- 1864: Closed and relocated
- 1895: Platforms 2 and 3 added
- 5 June 1950: Closed to passengers
- 1954: Closed to goods
- 1966: closed completely
Location

Broughton railway station served the village of Broughton, Scottish Borders, Scotland from 1860 to 1950 on the Symington, Biggar and Broughton Railway and Talla Railway.

== History ==
The first site of the station opened on 6 November 1860 by the Symington, Biggar and Broughton Railway. It wasn't intended to be open for long due to the extension of the line being planned. It closed in 1864 and was replaced by a goods yard with two sidings and a goods shed. To the north was an abattoir which was connected to one of the sidings. The station was relocated to the south and rebuilt in the same year. A signal box opened 1891 at the west end of the westbound platform which was added later. The second station initially had only one platform but a second and a third were added in 1895. The station closed to passengers on 5 June 1950 but it remained open for goods. The line to the west closed in 1954 but the station remained open to serve the abattoir until 1966 when the line closed completely.

Preceding station	Disused railways	Following station
Stobo; Line and station closed	Symington, Biggar and Broughton Railway	Biggar (Scotland); Line and station closed
Terminus	Talla Railway	Crook Halt; Line and station closed
