= Marion Cochrane =

- Died: 1559; St Boswells
- Education: literate
- Occupation: Scottish tenant farmer
- Known for: extant records of her life
- Spouse: John Stoddart
- Children: three

Marion Cochrane (died 1559) was a Scottish tenant farmer known because of the extant records about her. She spent her life at Lessuden (now St Boswells) in Roxburghshire (now the Scottish Borders).

== Life ==
Cochrane lived in the village of Lessudden although that settlement is now known as St. Boswells. The village was in Roxburghshire. At some point she married John Stoddart who lived at Lessudden as in 1550 she is recorded as his widow. She and John had children and she was still young so there was a chance of a remarriage. However she was literate and she recorded in some detail how her property was managed. Widows owning and managing properties was not unusual but Cochrane is important because her records are extant.

At some time before 1555 Cochrane's only son James died and this event justified her recording the details of the property that James sisters (her daughters) would inherit. In time her daughter Christian married Robert who was the son of Ninian Bryden. A pre-nuptial agreement was made which recorded that although Robert would live and work their land, Marion would retain the rights to it in her lifetime. Cochrane's younger daughter was given a financial package to compensate her for the family's land going to Robert and Christian.

In 1557 Marion was able to establish her rights to 45 Scottish acres of land. She was closely related to the previous occupier who had died and rights were presumed because of occupation. She had a feu charter to this land and her daughter Christian could inherit her rights as owner-occupier. She had to find a down payment and an annual charge but a feu charter gave a good chance of her family's future prosperity. She was among 32 people at that time who obtained rights to lands previously owned by Melrose Abbey. These lands had been bought and resold, at a tidy profit, by Henry Sinclair, then Dean of Glasgow, before they were offered to the 32.

Cochrane died in Lessudden (St Boswells) in 1559.
