= Peebles (West) railway station =

Disused railway station in Peebles, Peeblesshire

Peebles (West)
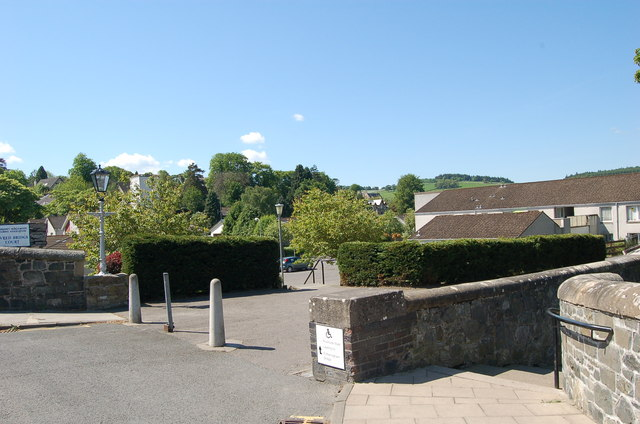
- The site of the station in 2009

General information
- Location: Peebles, Peeblesshire; Scotland
- Coordinates: 55.649509°N 3.194928°W
- Grid reference: NT249402
- Platforms: 1

Other information
- Status: Disused

History
- Original company: Caledonian Railway
- Post-grouping: London, Midland and Scottish Railway; British Railways (Scottish Region)

Key dates
- 1 February 1864: Opened
- 5 June 1950: Closed to passengers

Peebles (West) railway station was one of two railway stations that served the burgh of Peebles, Peeblesshire, Scotland from 1864 to 1950 on the Symington, Biggar and Broughton Railway and Peebles Railway.

== History ==
The station opened on 1 February 1864 by the Symington, Biggar and Broughton Railway. It opened eight months before the station of the same name. The goods yard, which had loading banks, a goods shed and a crane, was to the south. To the west was a locomotive shed with two roads. The signal box was to the north west. It was burned down in 1889 but rebuilt later in the year and rebuilt again in 1906 when the goods yard was expanded. The station closed to passengers on 5 June 1950.

Preceding station	Disused railways	Following station
Terminus	Caledonian Railway; Symington, Biggar and Broughton Railway	Lyne; Line and station closed
Peebles (New); Line and station closed	North British Railway; Peebles Railway	Cardrona; Line and station closed
