= Lyne Kirk =

Scottish historic church

Coordinates: 55°39′05″N 3°17′09″W

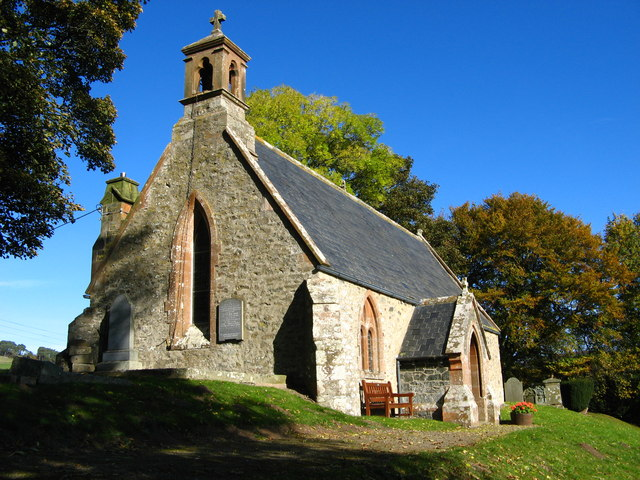
Lyne Kirk

Lyne Kirk is an ancient and historic kirk or church, of the Church of Scotland. It is situated on top of a mound adjacent to the A72 trunk route 4.5 miles west of Peebles in the ancient county of Peeblesshire, now in the Scottish Borders area, and governed by the Scottish Borders Council.

== Pre-Reformation ==
The church was founded in the 12th century, in the reign of William the Lion, as the Chapel of Lyne in the dependency of the nearby Stobo Kirk, and overseen by the Bishopric of Glasgow. While still part of the diocese of Glasgow, Lyne became a parish in its own right in the 14th century. Reverend Hew Scott, author of the Fasti Ecclesiae Scoticanae remarked in that publication that he believed Lyne was the cradle of Christianity in Peeblesshire.

== Post Reformation ministers, 1560-1682 ==
- Patrick Grinton 1560–1571
- Gilbert Hay 1575–1592
- John Ker 1593–1627
- Hew Ker 1627–1658 (son of the above named John)
- Robert Brown 1659–1682

== The later years ==
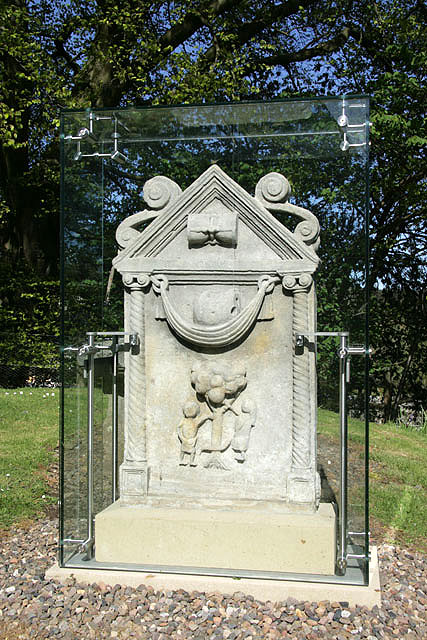
"Adam and Eve" gravestone of 1712

Towards the end of the Bishopric of Glasgow, Lyne Kirk was falling into disrepair and, in 1600, was described as ruinous. In 1644, the church was greatly renovated and refurbished to form the fine building seen today. The renovations were carried out by John Hay, 8th Lord Yester. In 1889, Francis Charteris, Earl of Wemyss carried out further major renewal work on the church.

- John Hay was later elevated to the earldom of Tweeddale.

The interior of the church is mainly 17th century with a pre-Reformation font and a new porch was added in the 19th century. The kirkyard contains many fine gravestones including the beautiful "Adam and Eve" gravestone, from 1712, depicting the temptation, by Lucifer, to eat the fruit of the tree of knowledge.

Lyne Kirk is open to visitors.

== See also ==
- Lyne Water
- Lyne
- Lyne Viaduct
- List of places in the Scottish Borders
