= Mertoun Bridge =

Bridge in the Scottish Borders, Scotland

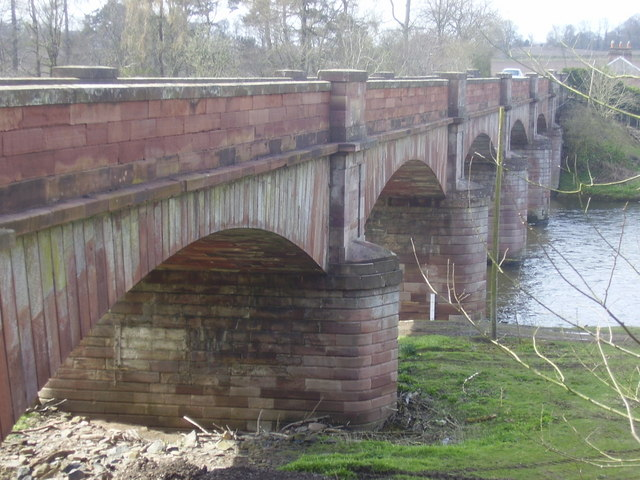
- Coordinates: 55.5804579°N 2.6206061°W
- Carries: B6404
- Crosses: River Tweed

Characteristics
- Material: Stone
- No. of spans: 5

History
- Designer: James Slight
- Built: 1841

Listed Building – Category B
- Official name: Mertoun Bridge
- Designated: 8 June 1971
- Reference no.: LB15113

Listed Building – Category B
- Official name: Mertoun Bridge
- Designated: 8 June 1971
- Reference no.: LB17410

Location
- Interactive map of Mertoun Bridge

The Mertoun Bridge is a bridge across the River Tweed in the Scottish Borders.

== History ==
The Act of Parliament that authorised the building of a bridge was passed in 1837, and it was designed by James Slight of Edinburgh. Although the original design was for a bridge built entirely of stone, it was eventually built with stone piers and wooden arches, but with sufficiently strong piers and abutments to allow stone arches to be used in the future.

A flood in September 1839 washed away all the wooden parts. It was rebuilt between 1839 and 1841 by William Smith of Montrose, with the piers raised by 2 feet (0.61 m) compared with the original design.

The stone arches were added in 1887. The bridge is a Category B listed building.

== Design ==
The piers built between 1 and 3 feet (0.30 and 0.91 m) into the bedrock, which was achieved by using cofferdams, and the depth of the bottom of the piers is between 6 feet 3 inches (1.91 m) and 11 feet 7 inches (3.53 m) below the summer level of the river. The piers are 18 feet (5.5 m) high from the summer level of the river to the base of the arches, and 29 feet 6 inches (8.99 m) long and 10 feet (3.0 m) deep, with a straight profile. The masonry used is ashlar, and the stone is a reddish sandstone quarried nearby.

The bridge carries the B6404 public road across the River Tweed near St Boswells. At the western end of the bridge is a toll-house, built on the embankment leading to the bridge. Nearby is the Mertoun House Bridge, a suspension footbridge dating from the mid-eighteenth century.

The Tweed is an important fishing river, and the Mertoun Bridge is the middle of the Mertoun Upper beat.

== See also ==
- List of bridges in Scotland
