= Stobo railway station =

Former railway station in Scotland

Stobo
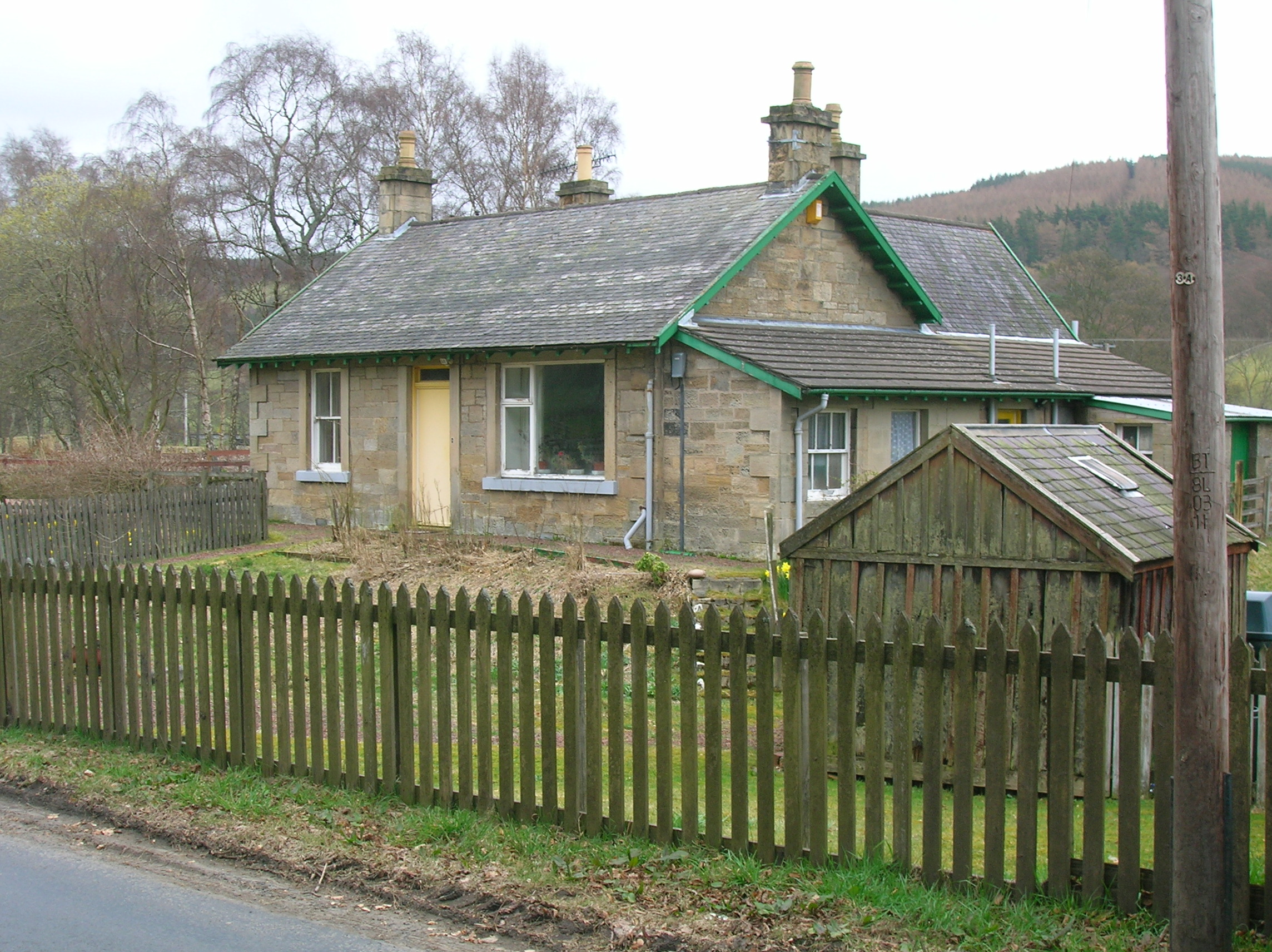
- Stobo station from the road in 2010

General information
- Location: Stobo, Scottish Borders; Scotland
- Coordinates: 55.6125°N 3.3146°W
- Grid reference: NT1729336224
- Platforms: 2

Other information
- Status: Disused

History
- Opened: 1 February 1864; 161 years ago
- Closed: 6 June 1950; 75 years ago
- Original company: Caledonian Railway
- Pre-grouping: Caledonian Railway
- Post-grouping: LMS

Key dates
- 7 June 1954: Closed to goods traffic
Location

Stobo railway station was a railway station in the Borders east of Biggar, serving the hamlet of Stobo; a rural community within the Parish of Stobo.

== History ==
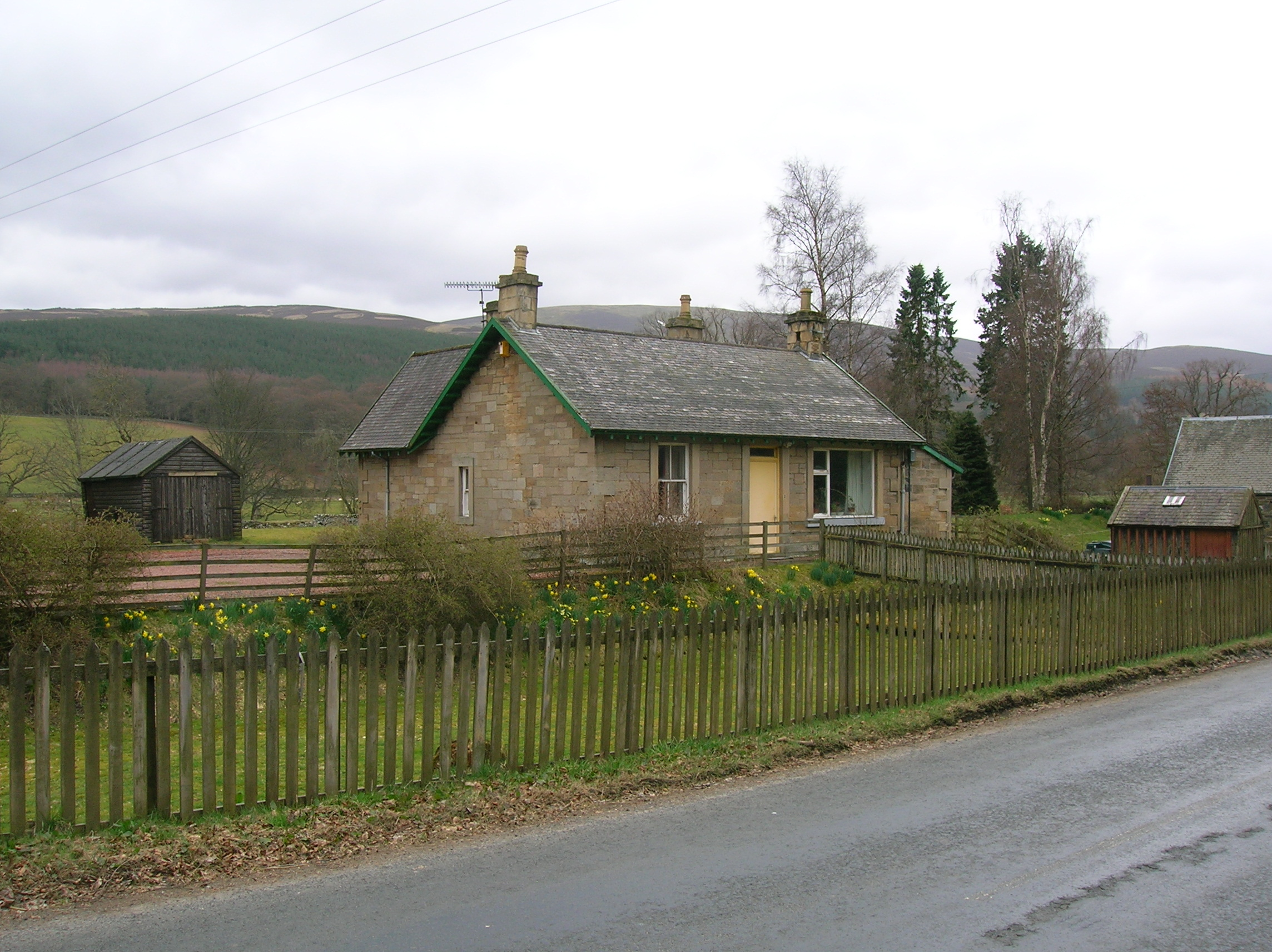
Stobo passenger station buildings.

The Symington, Biggar and Broughton Railway (S,B&BR) opened part of the line, however the extension to Peebles via Stobo was built by the Caledonian Railway once it had absorbed the S,B&BR.

Stobo station was opened in 1864. The "Tinto Express" was run by along this line from Peebles to Edinburgh to compete with the North British Railway's "Peebles-shire Express" which ran via Leadburn. The Caledonian route was longer and the company countered by emphasising the quality of their service.

The passenger station closed in 1950 and the station has been converted into a private home; the platforms are no longer visible. The goods yard has been used as a site for new housing.

Stobo was opened by the Caledonian Railway and in 1923 it became part of the London Midland and Scottish Railway at the Grouping, passing on to the Scottish Region of British Railways following the 1948 nationalisation of the railways. It was closed by the British Railways Board.

A neat rubble-built goods shed had two arched cart loading bays. The small scale of all the buildings reflects the limited traffic expected from this deeply rural part of old Peebles-shire, however the goods yard on the OS map is shown with several sidings.

The passenger service on this very rural line was an early victim of road competition.

The stylish station buildings reflect the fact that the station served nearby Stobo Castle and Dawyck House.

Preceding station	Disused railways	Following station
Broughton; Line closed; station closed	Caledonian Railway; Symington, Biggar, Broughton and Peebles	Lyne; Line closed; station closed

== See also ==
- List of places in the Scottish Borders
- List of places in Scotland
