= Thankerton =

Coordinates: 55°37′32″N 3°37′59″W

- Thankerton in 2015

- Location within South Lanarkshire
- OS grid reference: NS972379
- Council area: South Lanarkshire
- Lieutenancy area: Lanarkshire
- Country: Scotland
- Sovereign state: United Kingdom
- Post town: BIGGAR
- Postcode district: ML12
- Police: Scotland
- Fire: Scottish
- Ambulance: Scottish
- UK Parliament: Dumfriesshire, Clydesdale and Tweeddale
- Scottish Parliament: Clydesdale

Thankerton is a small village in South Lanarkshire, Scotland, United Kingdom. It is located between Biggar and Lanark, and situated between Quothquan Law and Tinto (two local hills).

Thankerton's name derives from an early feudal lord called Thancard the Fleming, and means Thancard's enclosure. Ton is Old English for an enclosed settlement, and evolved into the modern English word town. Thancard was probably one of the Flemish knights who accompanied David I to Scotland to claim the Scottish throne and as such was rewarded with grants of land in Scotland.

To the west of Thankerton is a hamlet called Eastend, on the south edge of the Carmichael Estate, whose main house, Eastend House, was used by the Polish Army between August 1940 and May 1941. A stone in the house, with the Polish eagle on it, commemorates the event.
