= St Boswells =

Coordinates: 55.570833°N 2.645833°W

St Boswells: Scottish Gaelic: Cille Bhoisil; Scots: Bosels / Bosells
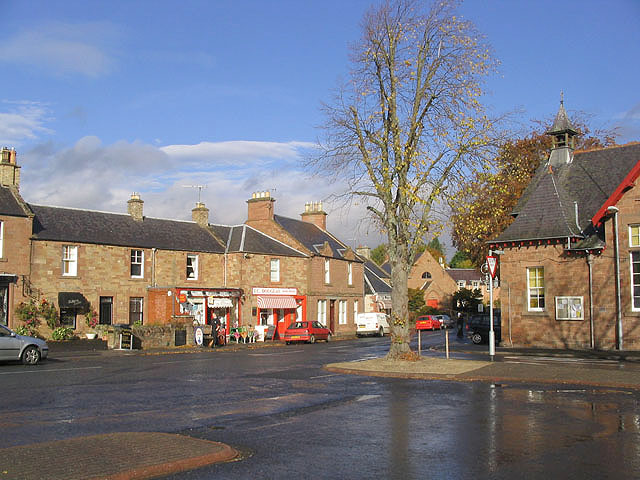
- Village centre

- Location within the Scottish Borders
- Area: 0.65 km^{2} (0.25 sq mi)
- Population: 1,440 (2020)
  - Density: 2,215/km^{2} (5,740/sq mi)
- OS grid reference: NT592309
  - Edinburgh: 34 mi (55 km) NW
- Civil parish: St Boswells
- Community council: St Boswells Parish
- Council area: Scottish Borders
- Lieutenancy area: Roxburgh, Ettrick and Lauderdale
- Country: Scotland
- Sovereign state: United Kingdom
- Post town: MELROSE
- Postcode district: TD6
- Dialling code: 01835
- Police: Scotland
- Fire: Scottish
- Ambulance: Scottish
- UK Parliament: Berwickshire, Roxburgh and Selkirk
- Scottish Parliament: Ettrick, Roxburgh and Berwickshire

St Boswells (Scots: Bosels / Bosells [ˈboːzəɫz]; Scottish Gaelic: Cille Bhoisil [ˈçiʎəˈvɔʃɪl]) is a village on the south side of the River Tweed in the Scottish Borders, about 1 mile (2 kilometres) southeast of Newtown St Boswells on the A68 road. It lies within the boundaries of the historic county of Roxburghshire.

It has a hotel, post office, award-winning butcher, garage, fish and chip shop, bookshop and café and several convenience stores. There is also a golf course next to the River Tweed, a cricket club, football club, rugby club and tennis club.

The village is mostly known for being on the route of St Cuthbert's Way, a long distance footpath linking Melrose Abbey (5 miles or 8 kilometres northwest) to the Holy Island of Lindisfarne off the Northumberland coast in north east England. The name commemorates Saint Boisil, an Abbot of Melrose.

The village has an annual gypsy fair, originally a focus for the trade of horses. This fair once attracted Gypsies from most parts of Scotland, northern England and Ireland. However, today it is little more than a two-day get-together on the village green. Fair day is on 18 July each year. It remains a popular opportunity for many locals to have their fortunes predicted.

== History ==
The Romans came to this area almost two thousand years ago, leaving Dere Street and the nearby fort of Trimontium as evidence of their occupation. Following the departure of the Romans, the area came under the sway of the Anglian kingdom of Northumbria.

In the 7th century Northumbria was ruled by the pagan leader Oswald who, upon converting to Christianity, established, with the help of St Aidan, a monastery at Lindisfarne. Under his leadership a monastery was built at Old Melrose. One of the monks from this new religious centre was Boisil, and it was he who gave his name to the village and parish of Saint Boswells. It is suggested that some of the dwellings were on the flat haugh below Benrig - a good site but prone to flooding, which may explain why they eventually moved to the higher ground at Lessudden (the place of Aidan) and the present site of St Boswells.

St Boswells gave its name to a settlement in southwest Saskatchewan, Canada. The settlement was founded in the early 20th century, and flourished up to the mid-1930s. With depopulation after World War Two it failed in the 1960s and is no longer in existence.

== Lessuden ==
Lessuden village, as it was then known, consisted of one long street, now Main Street, and a narrow back-road which ran along Braeheads, on the high banks of the river. Several paths connected Braeheads to the main street. The form of the old village remains pretty much today. The details of life at this time were recorded by Marion Cochrane who was a tenant farmer here. In 1544, the army of Henry VIII of England under the Earl of Hertford razed the Border Abbeys and caused destruction of dwellings in the village including Lessuden House, which was later rebuilt. Nearby this house stood the original village church called St Mary's which was established in the 12th century in the reign of David I. Through time the worshippers moved to a church erected at Benrig near St Boisil's Chapel which, with repeated repairs and reconstructions, stood until 1952 when it was finally demolished.

The worshippers from Benrig moved to the church in the village which itself has a history. In 1843, after a period of theological disaffection. One third of all ministers in the Church of Scotland walked out of the Assembly, mainly on the question of patronage, and formed the Free Church. A congregation was formed in St Boswells and originally met in a barn behind the old smiddy until a new church could be built in 1844. The re-unifications of 1900 and 1929 brought separated groups together again as one congregation and they worshipped in the building which has been variously known as St Boswells Free Church, the United Free Church, St Modans and now, St Boswells Parish Church. The building, still standing, was renovated in 1959.

== Employment ==
For many generations the main source of employment in the parish was agriculture. The village lands were divided into two parts—infield and outfield. The infield was cultivated for the growing of crops and the outfield was pasture. Crops grown included wheat, barley and peas. Turnips were a successful later addition. The scrubland and clay soil of the parish meant much hard work re-claiming land, drainage work, and liming. Wheat and barley were taken by cart to Dalkeith, Peebles and Melrose for the making of bread and beer, and carts returning from Dalkeith brought lime for the soil.

Improvement in farm implements led to changes in farming and large-scale industrialization put an end to much traditional farm work. An interesting note to the agricultural heritage of the community is that there was resistance from the village residents in the late 19th century to the removal of pig-sties from private homes and it is on record that there were eight farms in the village which were required to be registered as dairies.

Apart from agriculture and related industries, village life comprised many other trading activities necessary to a self-sufficient community. Joiners, plumbers, builders, drapers, bakers, butchers, fishmongers, publicans, carters, undertakers and bankers all managed to make a living from premises within the village boundaries. Modern life, ease of travel and changes in the nature of economic thinking have inevitably led to the depletion of local businesses.

== Village life ==
The 19th century saw many changes in St Boswells. The water-fountain in Main Street erected by Lord Polwarth of Mertoun is a remnant of the first public water system fed from Clintmains by lead pipes. Paraffin street lamps introduced in 1870 were replaced by gas-lamps in 1912. Electric street-lighting came in 1929. Two cast iron oil lamps, dated 1902, erected to commemorate the Coronation of King Edward VII can still be seen on brackets attached to the end of the Public Hall. They were renovated and repainted in 2016 and long-lasting LED bulbs were fitted. The old school at the top of Weirgate Brae was pulled down and a new one built in 1836 at what is now Hamilton Place. One of the builders of the schoolhouse was John Smith of Darnick who also sculpted the William Wallace Statue at Bemersyde House near Dryburgh. Mertoun Bridge was built to replace the old ford across the river, and population growth led to the building of the sandstone houses at West Croft and Jenny Moore's Road. The Public Hall was officially opened in 1896 and came to be used not only as a venue for public events, but also as a depository for village paraphernalia and as a storeroom for equipment belonging to the village fire-brigade. The hall still sees good use today by many community groups.

A great boon for the economy of the village was the building of the Kennels in 1836 for the Duke of Buccleuch's pack. The hunting season brought many visitors and this led to the building of the Buccleuch Arms Hotel. At this time the local smiddy showed good business sense by moving from the east end of the village to the present location at the west end, in order, we can suppose, to be nearer the Kennels which, at one time, stabled as many as fifty horses.

Many of the roads in the area originated as paths for walking or riding to the Auld Kirk at Benrig, or as access roads to farms and fields. The main roads to Melrose, Jedburgh and Kelso operated a turnpike system which meant that the horse-drawn coaches, some of which ran on a daily basis, had to pay road-tax at the various tollhouses, one of which can still be seen at Mertoun Bridge.

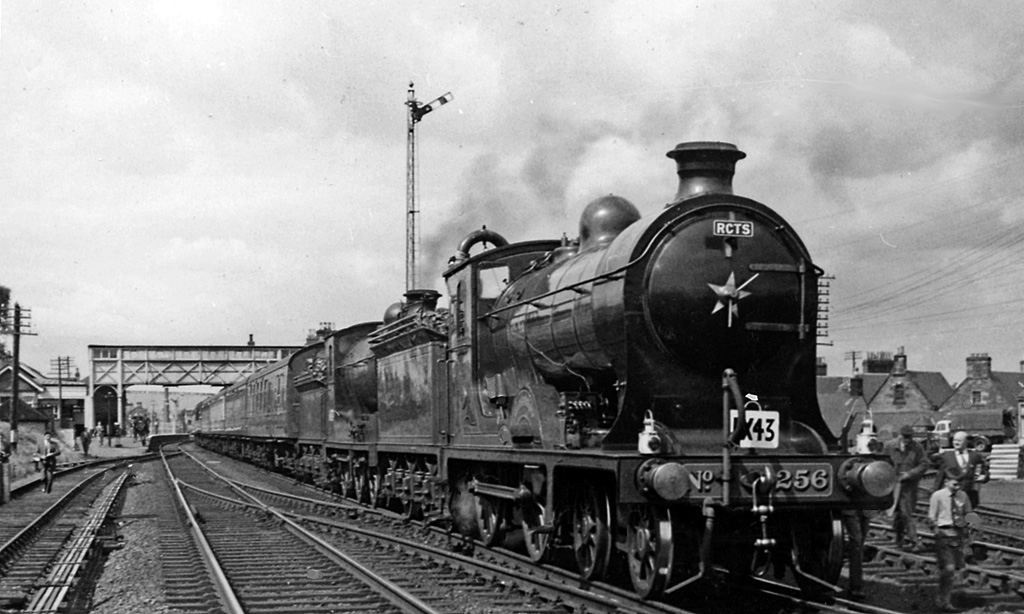
St Boswells railway station

One of the biggest changes in country life was the arrival of the railway in 1849. The initial building of the rail track, then operation and maintenance of the line meant new jobs for some and loss of jobs for others. The Waverley Line ran to the west of St Boswells and the nearest station was St. Boswells railway station at Newtown. One local business which did not lose out to the railway was operated by the Henderson brothers who ran a horse-drawn cab service to and from the station which was much used for both passengers and goods delivery. When times changed the brothers were envied by many when they purchased a Model T Ford, one of the first cars to be seen in the parish. The railway line was closed in 1969, but there is now public discussion about the possibility of its revival. The village green, still of considerable size, was once even bigger and old maps show it stretching as far as the tennis courts and up the west side of the A68 to behind the Kennels and across the cricket pitch. Originally common pasture land, its size and uses have changed from time to time and it has been used for sports, games, picnics, festivities and even military encampment.

Perhaps the best known use of the Green is the historic St Boswells Fair which is held on the 18 July every year. The fair used to be held on the flat haugh below Benrig but in 1743 the river level rose as a result of heavy rains and the Fair was flooded. With wet feet but undampened spirits, a decision was made to move the venue to the Green, and it has been held there ever since. Originally a sheep fair and a wool market, it came to be a selling point for cattle and horses. It was not uncommon for a thousand horses to change hands over the period of the Fair. Gypsies came in their brightly decorated wagons from other parts of Scotland, England and even Ireland. It was a time for merriment and fun making, with kiosks, booths and campfires offering a change from daily routine for local residents. The tradition continues and the Fair is still held on the same date every year, but in a greatly reduced form.

The civic awareness which inspired the planting of a Lime tree avenue on the Green to commemorate events such as Queen Victoria's Diamond Jubilee in 1898, the Boer War, the coronation of George V & Queen Mary in 1911 and the Buccleuch Golden Wedding in 1909 has given us a pleasant place to walk and think and be at peace. Cast iron plaques commemorating historical events from the end of the 19th and early 20th Century can still be seen on some of the trees. Four plane trees were planted on little hillocks, at the crossroads of the A68 and the A699, by Mrs. Dalrymple in 1900. They commemorate four victories in the Boer War - Ladysmith, Mafeking, Kimberly and Pretoria. They all had plaques with the names on them but only the Mafeking plaque remains.

The war years saw much activity in the village and the area was virtually taken over by the Army for various uses. There was a munitions factory at Charlesfield. Stores and fuel dumps were round every corner. The soldiers, many of whom were billeted in the Kennels, had support from the Home Guard, air raid wardens and voluntary ambulance drivers. Canteen facilities and first aid were provided by local organisations. Residents of the village, men and women, young and old, were united in their support of the war effort.

== The River Tweed ==
St Boswells village's river tweed flows course north of the village. Known for its salmon and brown trout. Many of the local houses were built of stones from the river bed. Walkers on St Cuthbert's Way through the village on pilgrimage from Melrose to Lindisfarne see the same view of the Eildon Hills as was seen by such men as Modan who established a religious cell at Dryburgh; Aidan who brought twelve young monks from Lindisfarne to Old Melrose as missionaries; Cuthbert who became prior and bishop and Boisil who, after a life of holiness and healing gave his name to the village and parish of St Boswells.

== Sports ==
St Boswells is one of the Borders' more active villages regarding organised sport.

Unusually for Scotland but not for the Borders region, part of the Green was given over to cricket. The present Club was constituted in 1895 and the current pitch, a gift from the Duke of Buccleuch used since the 1920s. About the same time the Curling Club was also formed. Using water from the Laret Burn, a pond was constructed just beyond the Green just about where the tennis courts now stand. Perhaps the winters really were more severe in days gone past because ice did form and games went ahead. Trees were planted at strategic points to prevent the sun's rays melting the ice. The pond was closed in 1964 and the club moved to Kelso indoor rink.

The cricket team has seen the most success having a brief spell in the national league in 2006 and winning the Border League four times between 2004 and 2008. The football and rugby team haven't seen similar fortune, though - both clubs finishing bottom of their respective leagues in the 2005–06 season. A comprehensive list of the St Boswells sports clubs is given below.

- Golf Club
- Tennis Club
- Model Boat Club
- Amateur Football Club
- Junior Football Club
- Cricket Club
- Badminton Clubs (Monday, Tuesday and Thursday)
- Curling Club
- Rugby Football Club

== In Literature ==
St. Boswells Fair features in James Hogg's comic tale Willie Wastle and his Dog Trap, first published in the Royal Lady's Magazine in July 1832. St. Boswells Green features in Elliot Cowan Smith's Mang Howes an Knowes: A Day's Dander Throwe Border Waeter-Gates, published by Allan Watt & Son, Hawick, in 1925.

== See also ==
- List of places in the Scottish Borders
- List of places in East Lothian
- List of places in Midlothian

== Sources of information ==
- Original History, Lessuden, Village Life, The River Tweed, Employment and some Sports material prepared by Murial Ovens, St Boswells, Scotland and reproduced with her kind permission.
