= River Tweed =

River in the Scottish Borders and northern England

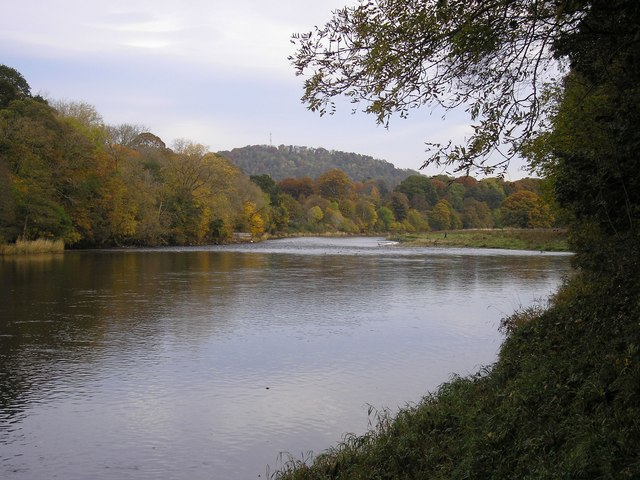
- The River Tweed at Abbotsford

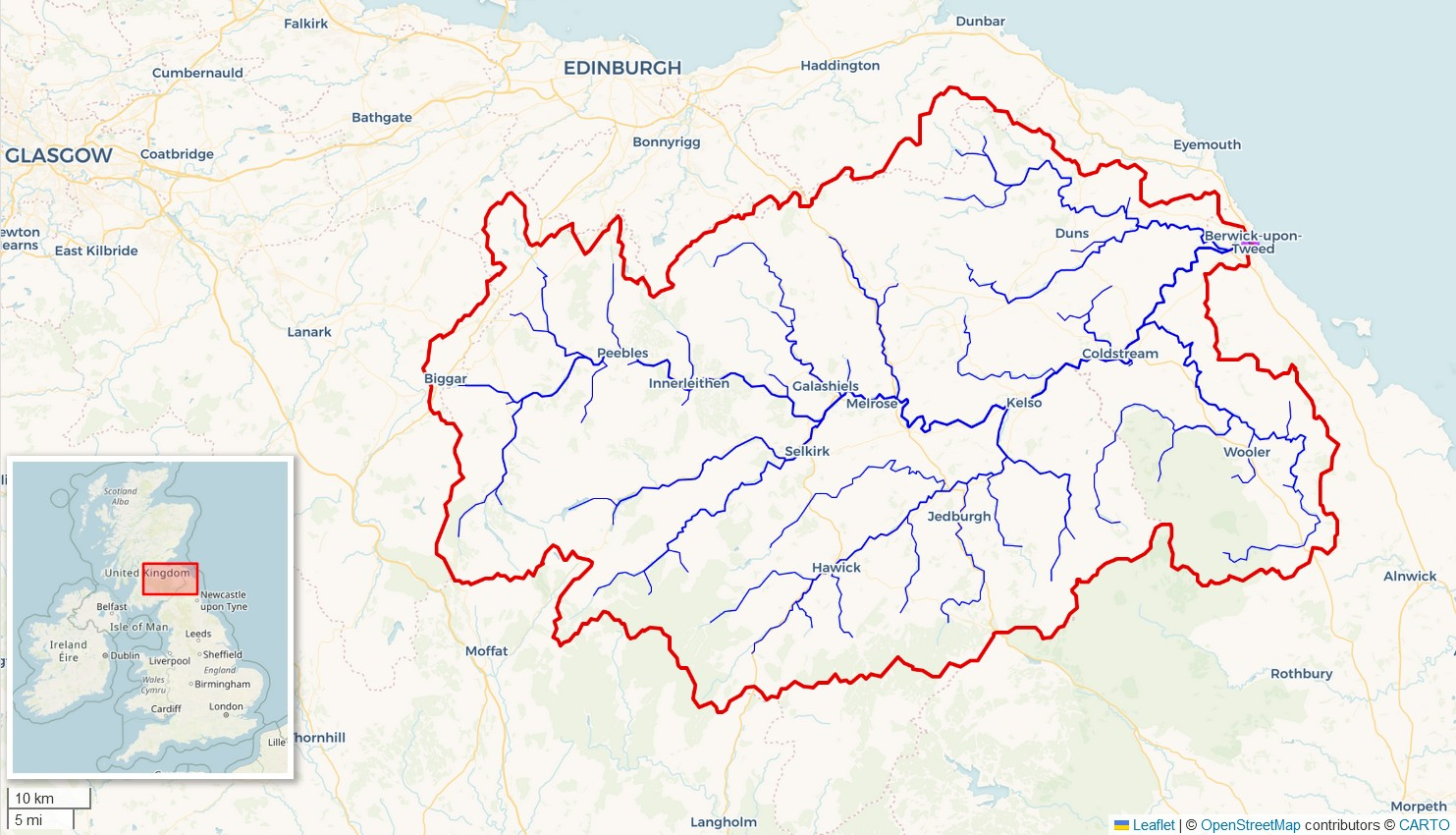
- River Tweed catchment (Interactive map)
- Native name: Uisge Thuaidh (Scottish Gaelic)

Location
- Country: United Kingdom
- Part: Scotland, England

Physical characteristics
- Source: Tweed's Well
  - location: Tweedsmuir, Scottish Borders, Scotland
  - coordinates: 55.445°N 3.496°W
- Mouth: North Sea
  - location: Berwick-upon-Tweed, Northumberland, England
  - coordinates: 55.7652°N 1.9909°W
- Length: 156 km (97 mi)

The River Tweed, or Tweed Water (Scottish Gaelic: Uisge Thuaidh [ɯʃgʲə huəj]), is a river 97 miles (156 km) long that flows east across the Border region in Scotland and northern England. Tweed cloth derives its name from its association with the River Tweed. The Tweed is one of the great salmon rivers of Britain and the only river in England where an Environment Agency rod licence is not required for angling. The river generates a large income for the Borders region, attracting anglers from all around the world.

== Etymology ==
Tweed may represent an Old Brittonic name meaning "border". A doubtful proposal is that the name is derived from a non-Celtic form of the Indo-European root *teuha- meaning "swell, grow powerful".

== Course ==
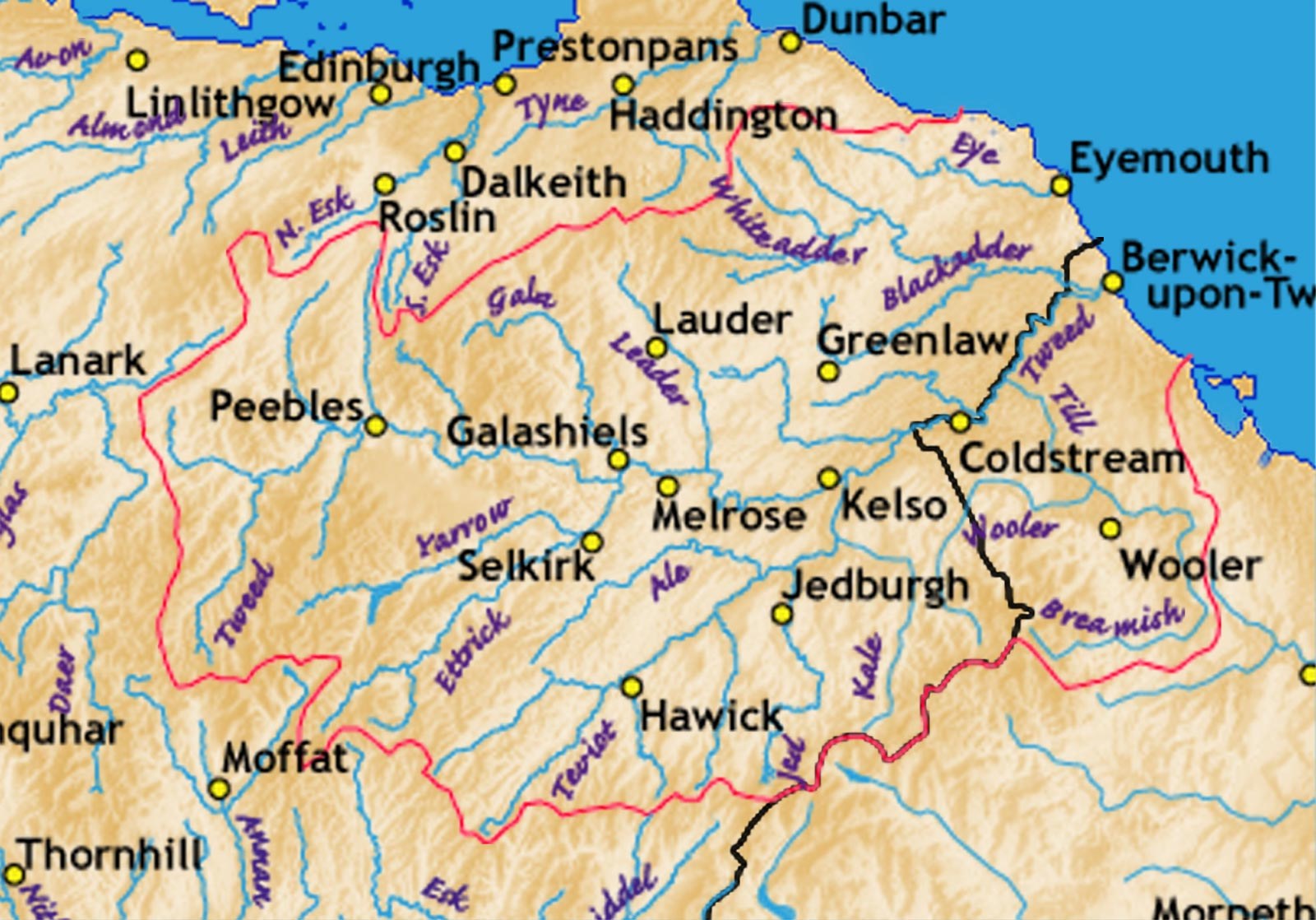
The catchment area of the Tweed

The River Tweed flows primarily through the scenic Borders region of Scotland. Eastwards from the settlements on opposing banks of Birgham and Carham it forms the historic boundary between Scotland and England.

It rises in the Lowther Hills at Tweed's Well near the rising points of the Clyde – draining northwest (10 kilometres (6.2 mi) from the Tweed's Well) – and the Annan, draining south (1.9 kilometres (1.2 mi) from the Tweed's Well).

"Annan, Tweed, and Clyde rise oot o' ae hillside" is a saying from the Border region. East of Kelso, it becomes a section of the eastern part of the border. Entering England, its lower reaches are in Northumberland, where it enters the North Sea at Berwick-upon-Tweed. For only 7 kilometres (4.3 mi) of its course is it purely in England, and for 30 kilometres (19 mi) it forms the border between England and Scotland.

== Catchment ==
The river east of St Boswells runs through a drumlin field. It is the relic of a paleo-ice stream that flowed through the area during the last glaciation. Major towns through which the Tweed flows include Innerleithen, Peebles, Galashiels, Melrose, Kelso, Coldstream and Berwick-upon-Tweed, where it flows into the North Sea. Tweed tributaries include:

- Whiteadder Water
  - Blackadder Water
- River Till
- Eden Water
- Teviot Water
- Leader Water
- Ettrick Water
  - Yarrow Water
  - Tima Water
- Gala Water
- Leithen Water
- Quair Water
- Eddleston Water
- Manor Water
- Lyne Water
- Holms Water

The upper parts of the catchment of the Tweed in Scotland form the area known as Tweeddale, part of which is protected as the Upper Tweeddale National Scenic Area, one of 40 such areas in Scotland, which are defined so as to identify areas of exceptional scenery and to ensure its protection from inappropriate development.. Notably, historical flooding in the Tweed catchment has been studied using documentary records. For example, in a 1990 study by Lindsey J. McEwen reconstructed chronologies of major flood events in four sub-catchments of the middle Tweed basin, examining their magnitude, frequency and seasonality.

== Management ==
Tweed Fisheries Act 1771
- Act of Parliament
- Parliament of Great Britain
- Long title: An Act for regulating and improving the Fisheries in the River Tweed, and the Rivers and Streams running into the same; and also within the Mouth or Entrance of the said River.
- Citation: 11 Geo. 3. c. 27
- Territorial extent: Great Britain

Dates
- Royal assent: 12 April 1771
- Commencement: 13 November 1770 (Note: Start of session.)
- Repealed: 29 May 1830
Other legislation
| Amended by | Tweed Fisheries Act 1775; Tweed Fisheries Act 1797; River Tweed Fisheries Act 1807 |
| Repealed by | River Tweed Fisheries Act 1830 |

Status: Repealed

Text of statute as originally enacted

Tweed Fisheries Act 1775
- Act of Parliament
- Parliament of Great Britain
- Long title: An Act for amending and rendering more effectual an Act, passed in the Eleventh Year of His present Majesty's Reign, intituled, "An Act for regulating and improving the Fisheries in the River Tweed, and the Rivers and Streams running into the same, and also within the Mouth or Entrance of the said River."
- Citation: 15 Geo. 3. c. 46
- Territorial extent: Great Britain

Dates
- Royal assent: 22 May 1775
- Commencement: 12 May 1775 (Note: Section 1.)
- Repealed: 29 May 1830
Other legislation
| Amends | Tweed Fisheries Act 1771 |
| Amended by | Tweed Fisheries Act 1797; River Tweed Fisheries Act 1807 |
| Repealed by | River Tweed Fisheries Act 1830 |

Status: Repealed

Text of statute as originally enacted

Tweed Fisheries Act 1797
- Act of Parliament
- Parliament of Great Britain
- Long title: An Act for altering, amending and rendering more effectual two Acts, made in the eleventh and fifteenth Years of the Reign of His present Majesty, for the Regulation and Improvement of the Fisheries in the River Tweed, and the Rivers and Streams running into the same, and also within the Mouth or Entrance of the said River.
- Citation: 37 Geo. 3. c. 48
- Territorial extent: Great Britain

Dates
- Royal assent: 3 May 1797
- Commencement: 3 May 1797 (Note: The Acts of Parliament (Commencement) Act 1793.)
- Repealed: 29 May 1830
Other legislation
| Amends | Tweed Fisheries Act 1771; Tweed Fisheries Act 1775 |
| Amended by | River Tweed Fisheries Act 1807 |
| Repealed by | River Tweed Fisheries Act 1830 |

Status: Repealed

Text of statute as originally enacted

River Tweed Fisheries Act 1807
- Act of Parliament
- Parliament of the United Kingdom
- Long title: An Act to amend and render more effectual Three Acts, made in the Eleventh,[ad] Fifteenth,[ae] and Thirty-seventh[af] Years of His present Majesty, for the Regulation and Improvement of the Fisheries of the River Tweed.
- Citation: 47 Geo. 3 Sess. 1. c. xxix
- Territorial extent: United Kingdom

Dates
- Royal assent: 25 April 1807
- Commencement: 25 April 1807
- Repealed: 29 May 1830
Other legislation
| Amends | Tweed Fisheries Act 1771; Tweed Fisheries Act 1775; Tweed Fisheries Act 1797 |
| Repealed by | River Tweed Fisheries Act 1830 |

Status: Repealed

Text of statute as originally enacted

River Tweed Fisheries Act 1830
- Act of Parliament
- Parliament of the United Kingdom
- Long title: An Act for the more effectual Preservation and Increase of the Breed of Salmon; and for better regulating the Fisheries in the River Tweed, and the Rivers and Streams running into the same, and also within the Mouth or Entrance of the said River.
- Citation: 11 Geo. 4 & 1 Will. 4. c. liv
- Territorial extent: United Kingdom

Dates
- Royal assent: 29 May 1830
- Commencement: 29 May 1830
- Repealed: 17 August 1857
Other legislation
| Repeals/revokes | Tweed Fisheries Act 1771; Tweed Fisheries Act 1775; Tweed Fisheries Act 1797; River Tweed Fisheries Act 1807 |
| Amended by | River Tweed Fisheries Act 1836 |
| Repealed by | Tweed Fisheries Act 1857 |

Status: Repealed

Text of statute as originally enacted

River Tweed Fisheries Act 1836
- Act of Parliament
- Parliament of the United Kingdom
- Long title: An Act to alter, amend, and enlarge the Powers of an Act paged in the Eleventh Year of the Reign of His late Majesty, intituled "An Act for the more effectual Preservation and Increase of the Breed of Salmon, and for better regulating the Fisheries in the River Tweed, and the Rivers and Streams running into the same, and abo within the Mouth or Entrance of the said River."
- Citation: 6 & 7 Will. 4. c. lxv
- Territorial extent: United Kingdom

Dates
- Royal assent: 21 June 1836
- Commencement: 21 June 1836
- Repealed: 17 August 1857
Other legislation
| Amends | River Tweed Fisheries Act 1830 |
| Repealed by | Tweed Fisheries Act 1857 |

Status: Repealed

Text of statute as originally enacted

Tweed Fisheries Act 1857
- Act of Parliament
- Parliament of the United Kingdom
- Long title: An Act to consolidate and amend the Acts for the more effectual Preservation and Increase of Salmon, and the Regulation of the Fisheries in the River Tweed.
- Citation: 20 & 21 Vict. c. cxlviii
- Territorial extent: United Kingdom

Dates
- Royal assent: 17 August 1857
- Commencement: 17 August 1857
Other legislation
| Repeals/revokes | River Tweed Fisheries Act 1830; River Tweed Fisheries Act 1836 |
| Amended by | Tweed Fisheries Amendment Act 1859; Rivers (Prevention of Pollution) (Scotland) Act 1951; Tweed Fisheries Act 1969 |
| Repealed by | Scotland Act 1998 (River Tweed) Order 2006 |

Status: Repealed

Text of statute as originally enacted

Revised text of statute as amended

Tweed Fisheries Amendment Act 1859
- Act of Parliament
- Parliament of the United Kingdom
- Long title: An Act to amend "The Tweed Fisheries Act 1857," and to alter the Annual Close Times in the River Tweed.
- Citation: 22 & 23 Vict. c. lxx
- Territorial extent: United Kingdom

Dates
- Royal assent: 1 August 1859
- Commencement: 5 October 1859 (Note: Section 3.)
- Repealed: 15 November 2006
Other legislation
| Amends | Tweed Fisheries Act 1857 |
| Amended by | Salmon Fisheries (Scotland) Act 1868; Salmon and Freshwater Fisheries (Protection) (Scotland) Act 1951; Tweed Fisheries Act 1969 |
| Repealed by | Scotland Act 1998 (River Tweed) Order 2006 (SI 2006/2913) |
| Relates to | Water Resources Act 1991 |

Status: Repealed

Text of statute as originally enacted

Revised text of statute as amended

Tweed Fisheries Act 1969 (Note: Section 1(1).)
- Act of Parliament
- Parliament of the United Kingdom
- Long title: An Act to amend the Tweed Fisheries Act 1857 and the Tweed Fisheries Amendment Act 1859; to apply certain provisions of those Acts to freshwater fish; and for other purposes.
- Citation: 1969 c. xxiv
- Territorial extent: United Kingdom

Dates
- Royal assent: 25 June 1969
- Commencement: 25 June 1969
- Repealed: 15 November 2006
Other legislation
| Amends | Tweed Fisheries Act 1857; Tweed Fisheries Amendment Act 1859 |
| Repealed by | Scotland Act 1998 (River Tweed) Order 2006 |

Status: Repealed

Text of statute as originally enacted

Revised text of statute as amended

Scotland Act 1998 (River Tweed) Order 2006
- Statutory Instrument
- Parliament of the United Kingdom
- Citation: SI 2006/2913
- Territorial extent: England and Wales; Ireland (Note: Section 1(3)–(5).)

Dates
- Made: 14 November 2006
- Commencement: 15 November 2006 (Note: Section 1(2).)
Other legislation
| Amends | Fisheries Act 1981; Criminal Procedure (Consequential Provisions) (Scotland) Act 1995 |
| Repeals/revokes | Tweed Fisheries Act 1857; Tweed Fisheries Amendment Act 1859; Salmon Fisheries (Scotland) Act 1868; Freshwater Fish (Scotland) Act 1902; Trout (Scotland) Act 1933; Salmon and Freshwater Fisheries (Protection) (Scotland) Act 1951; Tweed Fisheries Act 1969; Freshwater and Salmon Fisheries (Scotland) Act 1976; Deregulation (Salmon Fisheries (Scotland) Act 1868) Order 1996 (SI 1996/1211) |
| Made under | Scotland Act 1998 |

Status: Current legislation

Text of statute as originally enacted

Text of the River Tweed as in force today (including any amendments) within the United Kingdom, from legislation.gov.uk.

Despite the catchment straddling the border between Scotland and England, management of it – in terms of water quality, bio-security, and ultimately protection of the salmon of the River Tweed – is overseen by a single body, the River Tweed Commission.

== River Tweed Trail ==
In 2024 work started on the development of a 113-mile (182 km) walking and cycling route following the length of the river from Moffat, to Berwick-on-Tweed. The work includes new sections of path, upgrades to existing paths, bridge replacement and repairs, pedestrian road crossings, lighting and signage. The path is expected to be completed in 2028.

== Gallery ==
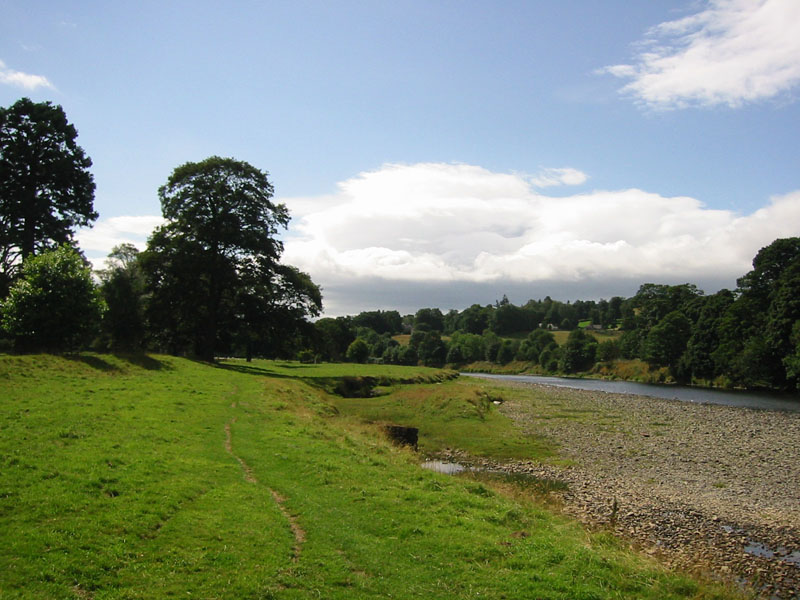
The River Tweed at Abbotsford, near Melrose

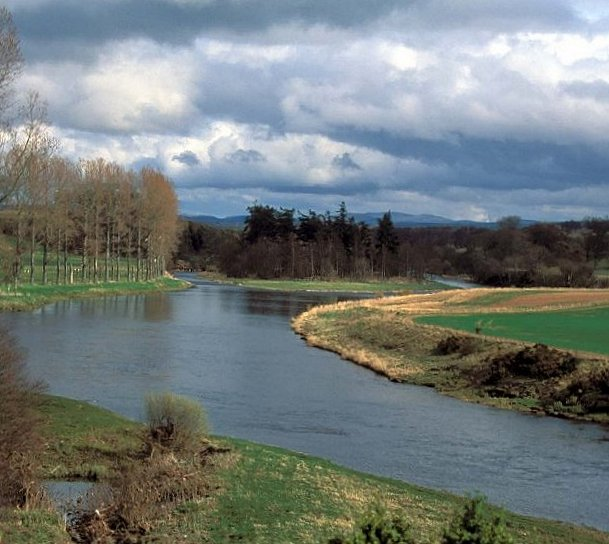
The River Tweed from Mertoun House, near St Boswells

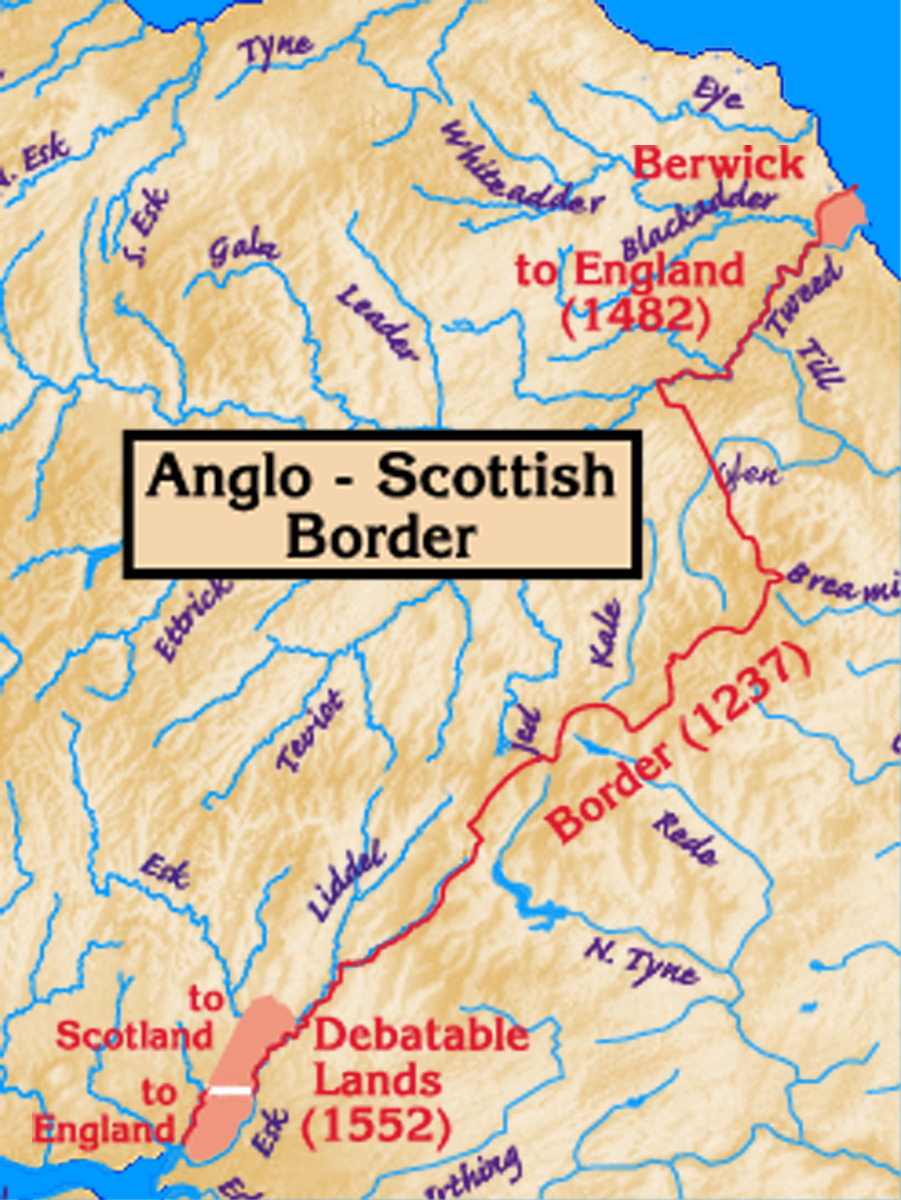
The Anglo-Scottish border, with the Tweed on the east. Its estuary and the town of Berwick-upon-Tweed were a late annexation by England.

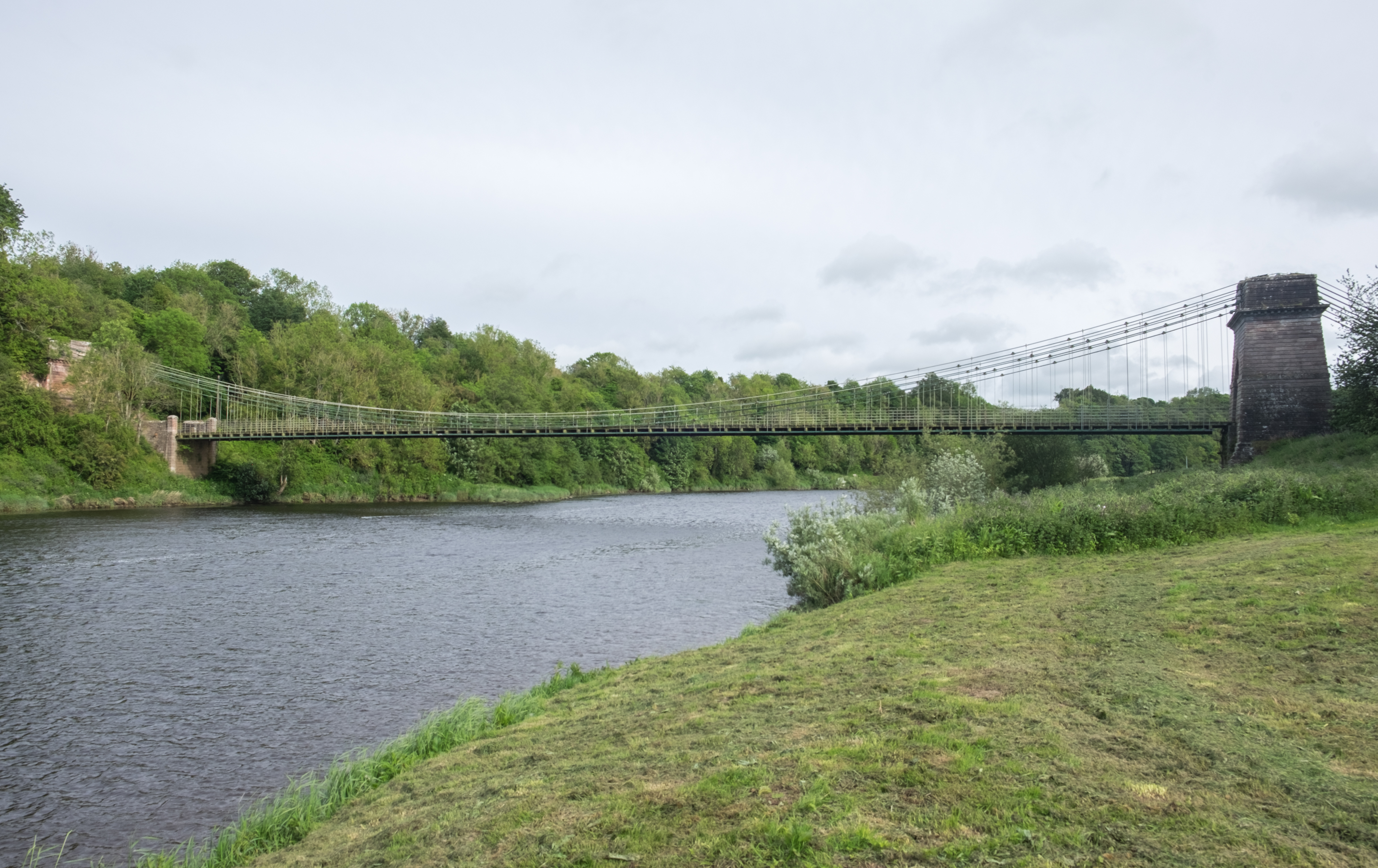
The Union Chain Bridge spanning the Tweed between Horncliffe, England, and Fishwick, Scotland

== See also ==
- List of Crossings of the River Tweed
- Anglo–Scottish border
- Both sides the Tweed
- Dryhthelm
- List of places in the Scottish Borders
- List of rivers of the United Kingdom
- Rivers and Fisheries Trusts of Scotland
