= Symington, Biggar and Broughton Railway =

Former railway line in Scotland

Overview
- Headquarters: Broughton
- Locale: Scotland
- Dates of operation: 21 May 1858–1861
- Successor: Caledonian Railway

Technical
- Track gauge: 4 ft 8 1/2 in (1,435 mm)

The Symington, Biggar and Broughton Railway was a railway company in southern Scotland. It built a line connecting Biggar, and later Peebles, to the main line railway at Symington. It was taken over by the Caledonian Railway in 1861, and was completed in 1864.

The Caledonian saw it as a strategic acquisition, potentially giving it access to the Borders towns more widely, but this aim never materialised, and the line did not develop beyond its purely local status. It closed to passengers in 1950, and completely by 1966.

== History ==
=== The Caledonian Railway main line ===
When the first main line between central Scotland and the English railways was being planned, the Annandale Route was favoured by many promoters; with some variations from the earliest planned route, that became the Caledonian Railway main line, nowadays part of the West Coast Main Line. The plans included a route to Edinburgh, and at first this was to leave the Glasgow to Carlisle line at Symington. This would have had the advantage of bringing Biggar into the route, but the alignment on from there was more difficult, and Glasgow to Edinburgh traffic would have had a much longer route. The Edinburgh line as actually built in 1849 left the Glasgow line at Carstairs instead.

=== Symington to Broughton ===
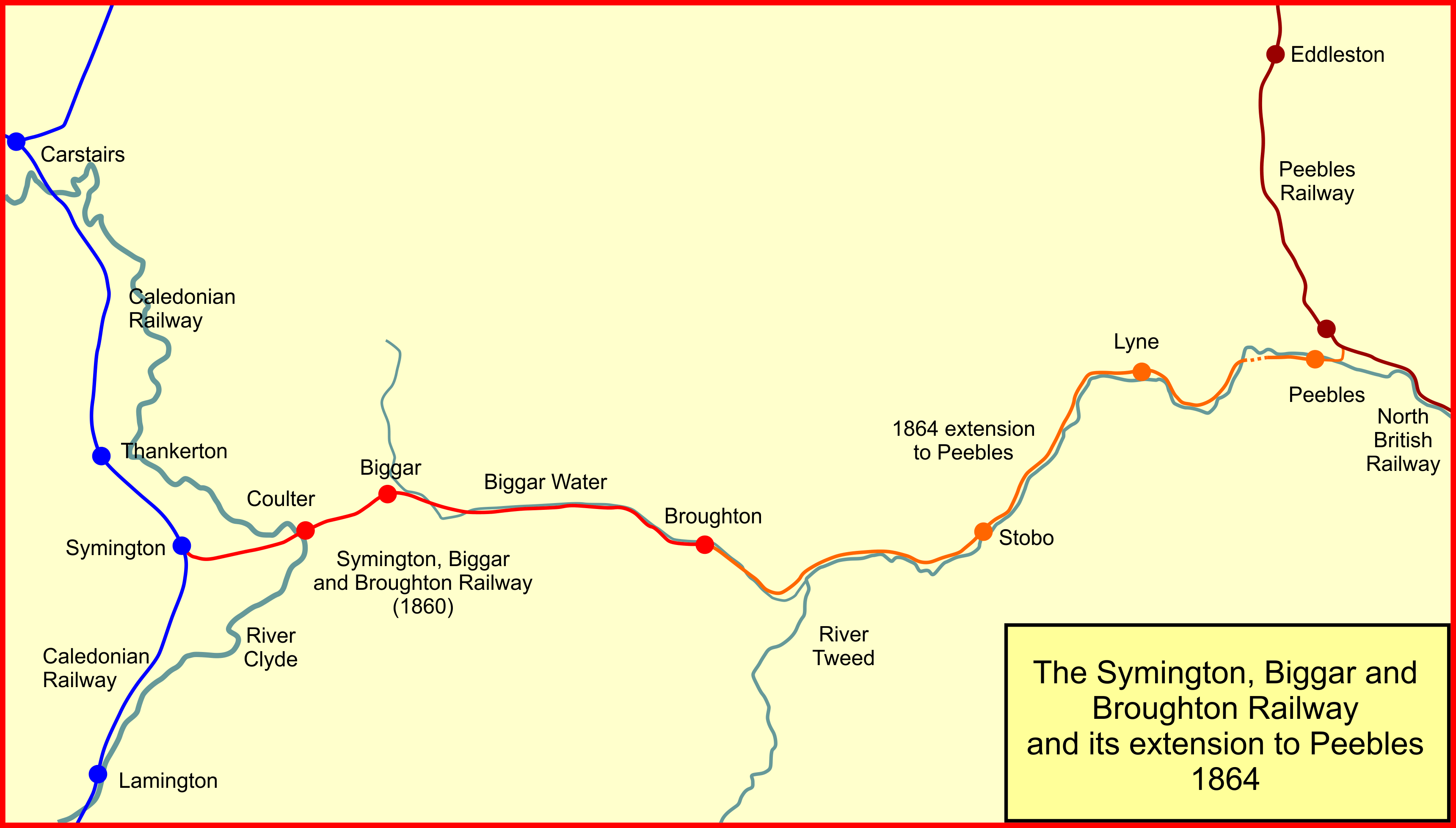
System map of the railway after extension to Peebles

Biggar was an important town, and the topography of the region was such that a railway connection posed no engineering difficulty. Local interests promoted a railway from Symington, on the Caledonian Railway main line. The Caledonian Railway was friendly to them, seeing their line as a possible launching point for access to the Lothian coalfields.

In 1857 plans for the line were taking definite shape, with the guidance of the engineer John Miller. The line was to be built for £30,290. At the insistence of the Caledonian, the land was to be acquired for double track, although only single track was to be laid at first: the Caledonian clearly saw the line as a future trunk route.

Symington, Biggar and Broughton Railway Act 1858
- Act of Parliament
- Parliament of the United Kingdom
- Long title: An Act for making a Railway from the Caledonian Railway, near Symington Station, to Biggar and Broughton; and for other Purposes.
- Citation: 21 & 22 Vict. c. xv

Dates
- Royal assent: 21 May 1858

The Symington, Biggar and Broughton Railway was authorised by an act of Parliament, the Symington, Biggar and Broughton Railway Act 1858 (21 & 22 Vict. c. xv), on 21 May 1858. Although the continuation to Broughton was very simple, along the broad valley of the Biggar Water, it is not clear what was the intended benefit of this lengthy extension. The population of Broughton parish was under 300 and there were no notable industries.

The authorised capital of the new line was £36,000 (Note: According to Carter and Marshall; Ross says £32,000, page 75.) with permitted loan capital of £12,000. The proprietors found it difficult to raise all the capital and appealed to the Caledonian Railway for help; the Caledonian subscribed £7,500 on condition that £20,000 was sourced locally, and this was done.

The line opened from Symington to Broughton on 5 November 1860, and it was worked by the Caledonian Railway.

=== Symington station ===
The junction with the main line at Symington was a little distance north of the earlier station there. It is likely that arriving branch trains simply reversed from the point of junction to the station, but this was not a long term arrangement, and the passenger station was moved to the junction, opening there on 30 November 1863. The former station remained as a goods station.

=== Extending to Peebles ===
During the construction period, the company decided to extend the line to Peebles, which was an important burgh. The extension was clearly prompted by the Caledonian Railway, and they advanced £6,000 for the parliamentary deposit, and promised to subscribe 20% of the extension's capital cost of £75,000. It was agreed that when the line was open to Peebles, the Caledonian would purchase the line at cost.

Symington, Biggar and Broughton Railway (Extension) Act 1860
- Act of Parliament
- Parliament of the United Kingdom
- Long title: An Act to enable the Symington, Biggar, and Broughton Railway Company to extend their Railway from Broughton to Peebles; and for other Purposes.
- Citation: 23 & 24 Vict. c. cxx

Dates
- Royal assent: 3 July 1860

Caledonian and Symington, Biggar and Broughton Railways Amalgamation Act 1861
- Act of Parliament
- Parliament of the United Kingdom
- Long title: An Act to authorize the Amalgamation of the Symington, Biggar, and Broughton Railway Company with the Caledonian Railway Company; and for other Purposes.
- Citation: 24 & 25 Vict. c. cci

Dates
- Royal assent: 1 August 1861

The extension was authorised by the Symington, Biggar and Broughton Railway (Extension) Act 1860 (23 & 24 Vict. c. cxx) on 3 July 1860. Lord Elgin had declared that he would oppose the bill unless the railway were carried through tunnel at Neidpath on his property. The Caledonian declined to do this, but in the face of determined opposition finally conceded the point. The original directors of the SB&BR were local men and the power politics and large capital sums were making them uncomfortable, so that they petitioned the Caledonian in 1860 to take over the entire SB&BR system. This was agreed and the Caledonian and Symington, Biggar and Broughton Railways Amalgamation Act 1861 (24 & 25 Vict. c. cci) authorising the amalgamation was passed on 1 August 1861. The Caledonian Railway absorbed the company and continued the construction itself.

The Caledonian's expansionist policy found Peebles an attractive destination, from which further incursions into the Borders might be launched, and the Caledonian agreed to subscribe £20,000 to the extension railway. Galashiels was considered as an objective, but that aspiration was shared by the NBR, which had reached Peebles in 1855 (through the medium of the Peebles Railway) which it worked. Much earlier Peebles had been an agreed frontier post between Caledonian and NBR expansion, but that agreement was long forgotten. Now negotiation resulted in the Caledonian allowing the NBR to build a line to Galashiels without opposition in Parliament; in return it could make a triangular junction with the NBR (Peebles Railway) line at Peebles, facing north and south.

The extended line was opened as far as a separate station at Peebles on 1 February 1864, without ceremony. At Broughton the passenger terminus was by-passed and a new passenger station adjacent was built; the old station became a goods depot. The Symington line station at Peebles was on the south of the River Tweed and the NBR station was on the north side. The act of Parliament permitting the extension included authorisation to connect to the NBR line.

For some years the passenger train service consisted of four or five journeys each way six days a week; the journey time was about 45 minutes, with a transit to Glasgow from Peebles taking a little over two hours.

=== Crossing the Tweed ===
The triangular junction at Peebles, fought for so fiercely with visions of through running into the heart of NBR territory, was reduced in scope to a simple transfer link. The Caledonian built an awkward seven arch skew viaduct across the Tweed to reach the NBR station, facing north, connecting to the NBR station. It opened on 16 April 1866; it was probably never for passenger traffic, and was limited to transfer of goods wagons only. On 24 May 1866, Captain Rich of the Railway Inspectorate, examined the Innerleithen-Galashiels section of the North British Railway, and also the link line from the Caledonian. The link ran through several sidings in the NBR goods yard, and Captain Rich refused to sanction passenger operation on the link until the layout was altered. This was never done, and passenger operation was never authorised.

The south-facing connection was never built. (Note: However the One-inch Ordnance Survey sheet 24 published in 1873 shows it.)

=== The Royal Highland Show ===
In 1906 the Royal Highland Show was planned to take place at Peebles. The station accommodation was extremely limited, and the Caledonian Railway enlarged the facilities in preparation, during 1905. An island platform was provided with much extended siding accommodation, together with a 60 feet (18.3 m) turntable.

=== Talla Reservoir ===
In the period 1897 - 1905 the Talla Reservoir was constructed by the Edinburgh and District Water Trust. This was a prodigious undertaking involving the import of considerable volumes of materials, and the Talla Railway was built as a service line for the purpose. The Talla Railway was over 10 miles (16 km) long running almost due south from Broughton. In fact the line ran alongside the Peebles line (as two single lines on a double track formation) for about a mile south-east from Broughton before diverging. Broughton station was enlarged to deal with the traffic.

=== Name of Peebles station ===
The station at Peebles was always called "Peebles". The North British Railway station on the other side of town was renamed "Peebles East" on 25 September 1950. At this time the Caledonian station had closed to passenger services, and it was never given the "West" specifier. However the station continued in use as a goods station, and it was this that was renamed "Peebles West Goods Station" in September 1952.

=== Closure ===
The passenger traffic had never developed as had been hoped, and the line from Peebles to Symington was closed to passengers on 5 June 1950, although Biggar saw some special school traffic until 14 August 1950.

Goods traffic continued until the line from Peebles West to Broughton closed completely on 7 June 1954, and the final closure (from Symington to Broughton) was on 4 April 1966. The section of the old line between Broughton and Biggar (starting beyond the coal yard in Broughton) is used as a footpath. The section from Neidpath Viaduct to Lyne Station is also a public footpath.

When the branch line closed in 1954, the Peebles (West) goods yard continued in use, served by the link line from the NBR line. Since the closure of the NBR engine shed, engines requiring to be turned crossed to the Caledonian goods station to turn on the turntable there.

Peebles West Goods Depot and the link line were closed completely on 1 August 1959.

== Passenger train service ==
As the line never developed into the envisaged trunk route, the passenger service never developed either: the branch simply led to Symington, to which no-one wished to go.

The passenger service in 1895 consisted of four trains eastbound and five westbound daily; some of these only worked between Biggar and Symington, but some branch trains worked to and from Carstairs.

From 1883 the Caledonian had attempted to encourage tourist traffic at Peebles and Moffat, and ran a train from both places, combining at Symington, to Glasgow and Edinburgh in the morning, returning in the afternoon. It was called The Tinto Express although there were eight intermediate stops between Symington and Glasgow Central in the northbound direction.

== Topography ==
- Symington; junction station on the main line, facing for trains from Carstairs;
- Coulter;
- Biggar;
- Broughton;
- Stobo Castle;
- Lyne;
- (Neidpath Viaduct over the Tweed, followed by Neidpath Tunnel, 674 yards (616 m));
- Peebles.

There was an engine shed at Broughton, which was demolished when the line was extended to Peebles, and the Neidpath Viaduct over the Tweed between Lyne and Peebles still stands and is used as a footbridge. The nearby Neidpath Tunnel was used as a refuge during World War II.

== See also ==
- Railscot on Symington, Biggar and Broughton Railway
- Railscot on Talla Railway
