= Newstead, Scottish Borders =

Village in Scottish Borders, Scotland

Coordinates: 55.598°N 2.6919°W

Newstead: Scots: Newstead
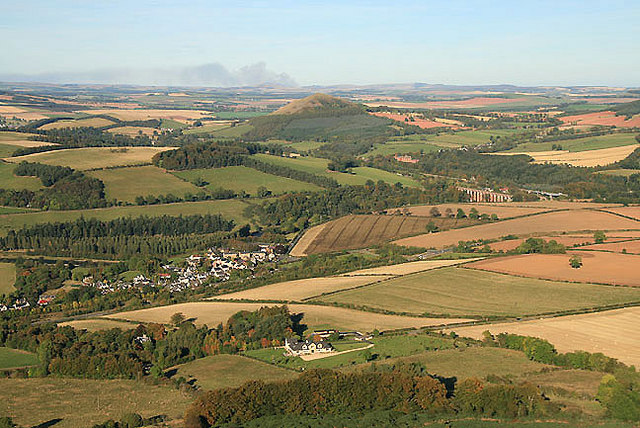
- Looking northeast from Eildon Hill North, Newstead below on the left

- Location within the Scottish Borders
- Population: 256 (2001 census)
- OS grid reference: NT565341
- Council area: Scottish Borders
- Lieutenancy area: Roxburgh, Ettrick and Lauderdale
- Country: Scotland
- Sovereign state: United Kingdom
- Post town: MELROSE
- Postcode district: TD6
- Dialling code: 01896
- Police: Scotland
- Fire: Scottish
- Ambulance: Scottish
- UK Parliament: Berwickshire, Roxburgh and Selkirk
- Scottish Parliament: Ettrick, Roxburgh and Berwickshire

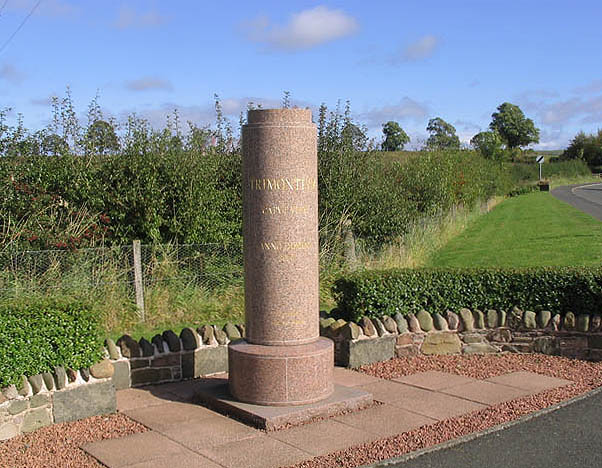
Newstead Millennium milestone

Newstead is a village in the Scottish Borders, about 1 1/4 miles (2 kilometres) east of Melrose. It has a population of approximately 260, according to the 2001 census.

== Location and history ==
It is situated in the valley of the River Tweed, at a crossing point for the Roman Dere Street. Newstead was of great strategic importance throughout history. This was principally due to the proximity of the prominent Eildon Hill. Former inhabitants include: the ancient Selgovae; the Roman army at Trimontium (Newstead); monks and masons, builders of nearby Melrose Abbey and, more recently, navvies working on the impressive railway viaduct at Leaderfoot.

It is reputedly the oldest continually-inhabited settlement in Scotland. It was the site of the largest of the Roman "outpost" forts after the construction of Hadrian's Wall in the 120s AD. Certainly buildings, inhabited by the locals who provided for the needs of the soldiers when the Romans were there, and that the people who remained when the Romans went back south continued to live there, and that a population is recorded there from 650 AD onwards, until the present day. The stonemasons, architects and other tradesmen who built Melrose Abbey were lodged here. In 1905 it was the site of a discovery of a very rare Roman helmet.

Newstead lies within the Berwickshire, Roxburgh & Selkirk UK Parliament constituency, whose MP is John Lamont. It lies in the Tweeddale, Ettrick and Lauderdale Scottish Parliament constituency, whose MSP is Christine Grahame.

== Places of interest ==
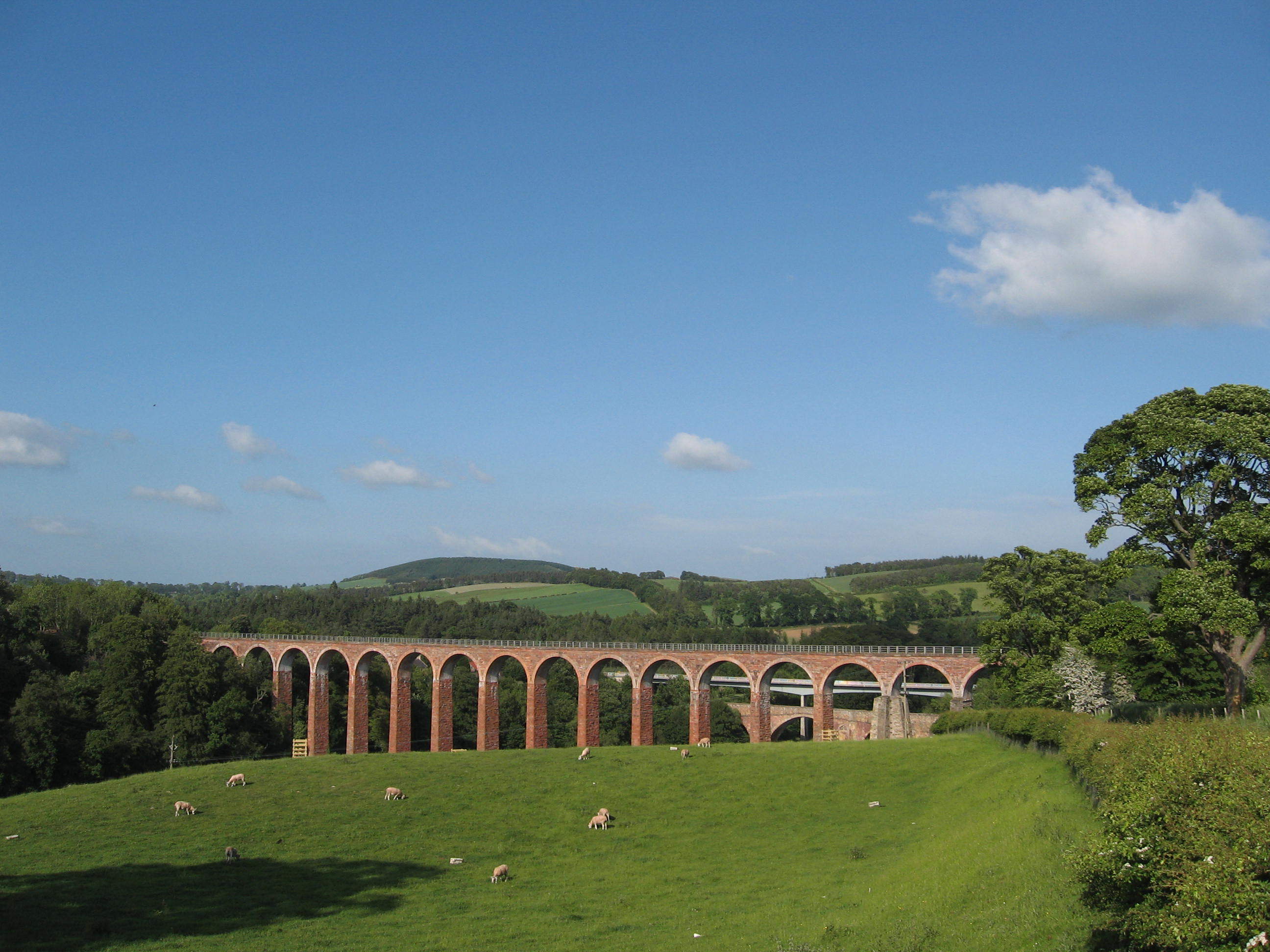
Railway viaduct at Leaderfoot

On the main street is the Village Hall which was the school until 1937 when it was closed. The hall is used as the main meeting place and for other community functions – it is the only non-residential building in the village available for public use.

St John's Wynd, a lane leading to the site of the first Masonic Lodge in Scotland. Set up by the masons, mainly to regulate training and craftsmanship of the apprentices, before becoming journeymen, the Lodge certainly existed before 1600. The building fell into disrepair after the Lodge moved its premises to Melrose in 1742. Only a marker stone and plaque now remain.

The old railway bridge at Leaderfoot is only a ten-minute walk from Newstead village. In 1865 the magnificent nineteen-arch Leaderfoot Viaduct was constructed for the St Boswells Junction to Reston section of the Berwickshire Railway, a line which closed in 1948. It is no longer considered safe to walk over the bridge, so only viewing the bridge is possible.

== Notable residents ==
Admiral Sir Henry Fairfax of Ravenswood was born in Edinburgh, to the well-known Fairfax family and spent his life in the Royal Navy. As owner of much of the land around Newstead, on his death in 1900, his widow Dame Harriet gave land and set up a trust to provide a Library, a Mission Hall, and a Reading Room, for the benefit of the residents of the village. Nothing remains of these buildings, although a marble bust, once in the grounds, is now in the Village Hall.

The British Olympic sprinter Dr. Isobel "Quita" Barber (née Shivas, 19 April 1925 – 18 March 2013), who competed at the 1952 Summer Olympics in Helsinki, spent most of her life in Newstead.

One of the best known contemporary village residents is the journalist and author Liz Taylor who writes under the name Elisabeth McNeill. Her most famous novel is probably A Bridge in Time.

== See also ==
- List of places in the Scottish Borders
- List of places in Scotland
