= Edrom railway station =

Disused railway station in Edrom, Scottish Borders

Edrom
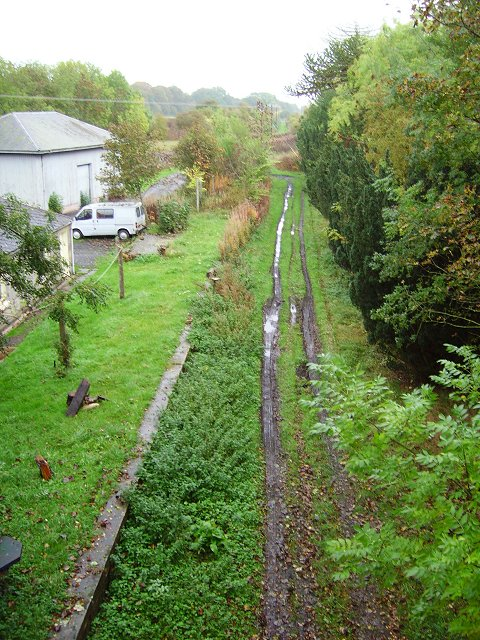
- The remains of the station in 2006

General information
- Location: Edrom, Scottish Borders; Scotland
- Coordinates: 55.7884°N 2.2679°W
- Grid reference: NT833550
- Platforms: 2 (upon opening); 1 (other platform later removed)

Other information
- Status: Disused

History
- Original company: North British Railway
- Pre-grouping: North British Railway
- Post-grouping: LNER; British Rail (Scottish Region)

Key dates
- May 1852: Opened
- 10 September 1951: Closed
Location

Edrom railway station served the village of Edrom, Scottish Borders, Scotland from 1852 to 1951 on the Berwickshire Railway.

== History ==
The station opened in May 1852 by the North British Railway. It initially had two platforms but it was later reduced to one when the line was singled. To the northeast was the goods yard which had a loading bank and a shed. A viaduct was built over the Whiteadder Water to support the railway. The station closed to passengers on 10 September 1951.

Preceding station	Historical railways	Following station
Chirnside	North British Railway; Berwickshire Railway	Crumstane
