= Tripontium (disambiguation) =

Tripontium is a Roman town in Warwickshire and Leicestershire, England.

Tripontium (meaning in Latin: "Three Bridges") may also refer to:

- Tripontium (Melrose), Scottish Borders
- Tripontium, Lazio, near Forum Appii, Lazio, Italy
- Triponzo in Umbria
