= Eildon Hill =

Mountain in Scotland

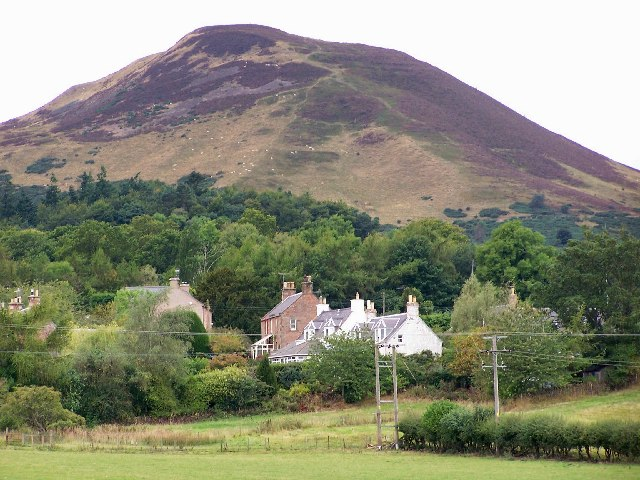
- Eildon Hill North, with Eildon Village in the foreground

Highest point
- Elevation: 422 m (1,385 ft)
- Prominence: c. 164 m
- Listing: Marilyn

Naming
- English translation: possibly "fort Hill", "fire hill," "hill of the fenced enclosure," or "deserted hill"
- Language of name: Old English, possibly partly Cumbric
- Pronunciation: /ˈiːldən/

Geography
- Location: Scottish Borders, Scotland
- Parent range: According to Nuttall, the 1,385 ft (422 m) "triple-crested eminence" overlooks Teviotdale to the South.
- OS grid: NT548322
- Topo map: OS Landranger 73

Eildon Hill lies just south of Melrose, Scotland in the Scottish Borders, overlooking the town. The name is usually pluralised into "the Eildons" or "Eildon Hills", because of its triple peak. The 422-metre-high (1,385-foot) eminence overlooks Teviotdale to the South. The igneous rock formation results from volcanic activity 350 million years ago. The north hilltop (of three peaks) is surrounded by over five kilometres (three miles) of ramparts, enclosing an area of about 16 hectares (40 acres) in which at least 300 level platforms have been cut into the rock to provide bases for turf or timber-walled houses, forming one of the largest hill forts known in Scotland. A Roman army signalling station was later constructed on the same site as this hill fort.

The mid hilltop is the highest, whilst the south hilltop is the lowest. The hills are owned by the Duke of Buccleuch, Scotland's largest private landowner. As with all land in Scotland the public have a right of responsible access to the hills, and there are many paths crossing the area and leading to all three summits.

The hills form part of the Eildon and Leaderfoot National Scenic Area, one of forty national scenic areas in Scotland, which have been defined so as to identify areas of exceptional scenery and to ensure its protection from inappropriate development. The areas protected by the national scenic area (NSA) designation are considered to represent the type of scenic beauty "popularly associated with Scotland and for which it is renowned". The Eildon and Leaderfoot NSA covers 3,877 hectares (9,580 acres), and extends to include the town of Melrose, Scott's View and Leaderfoot Viaduct.

== History ==
Eildon and Leaderfoot National Scenic Area
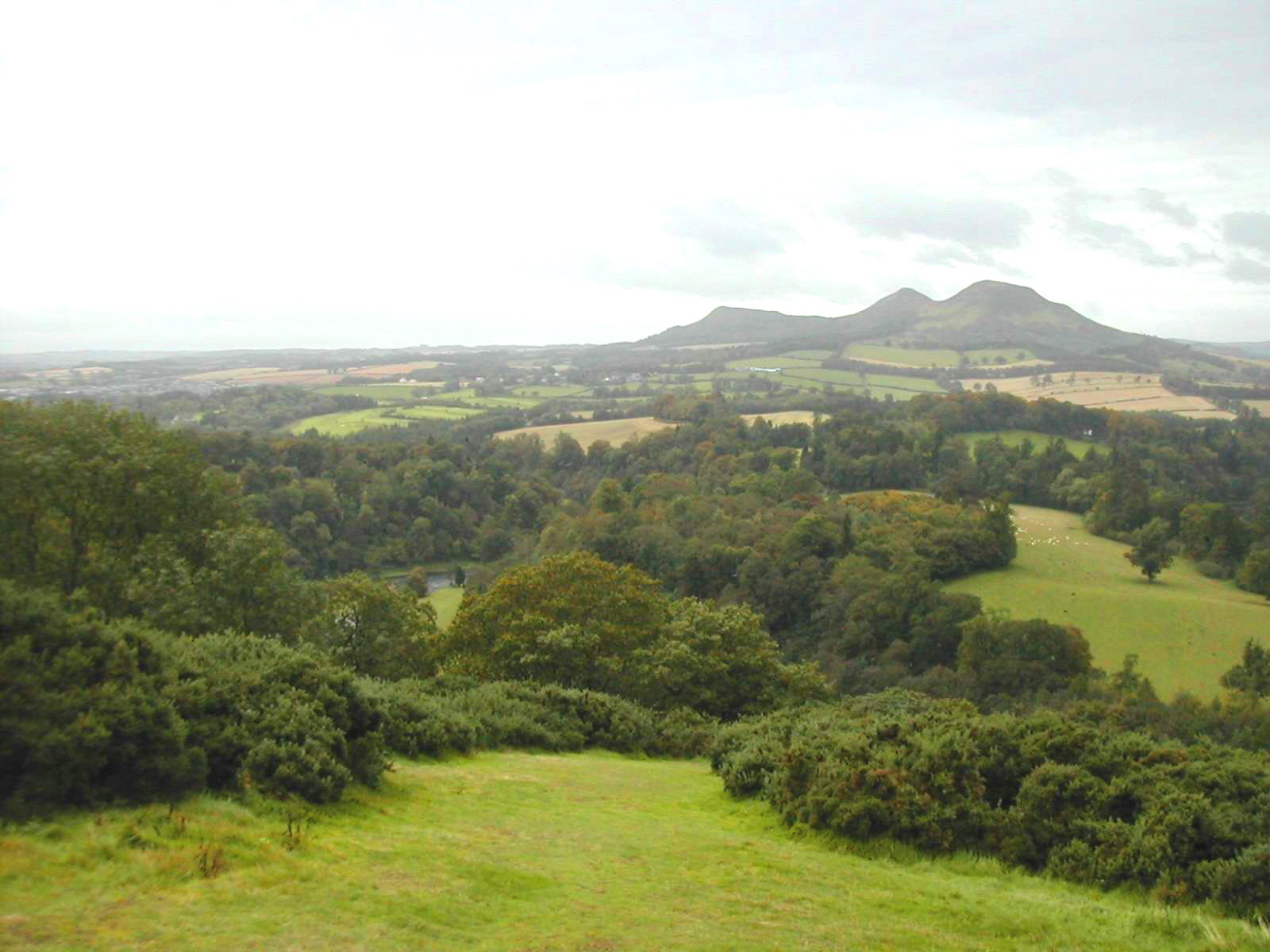
- The three peaks of Eildon Hill seen from Scott's View

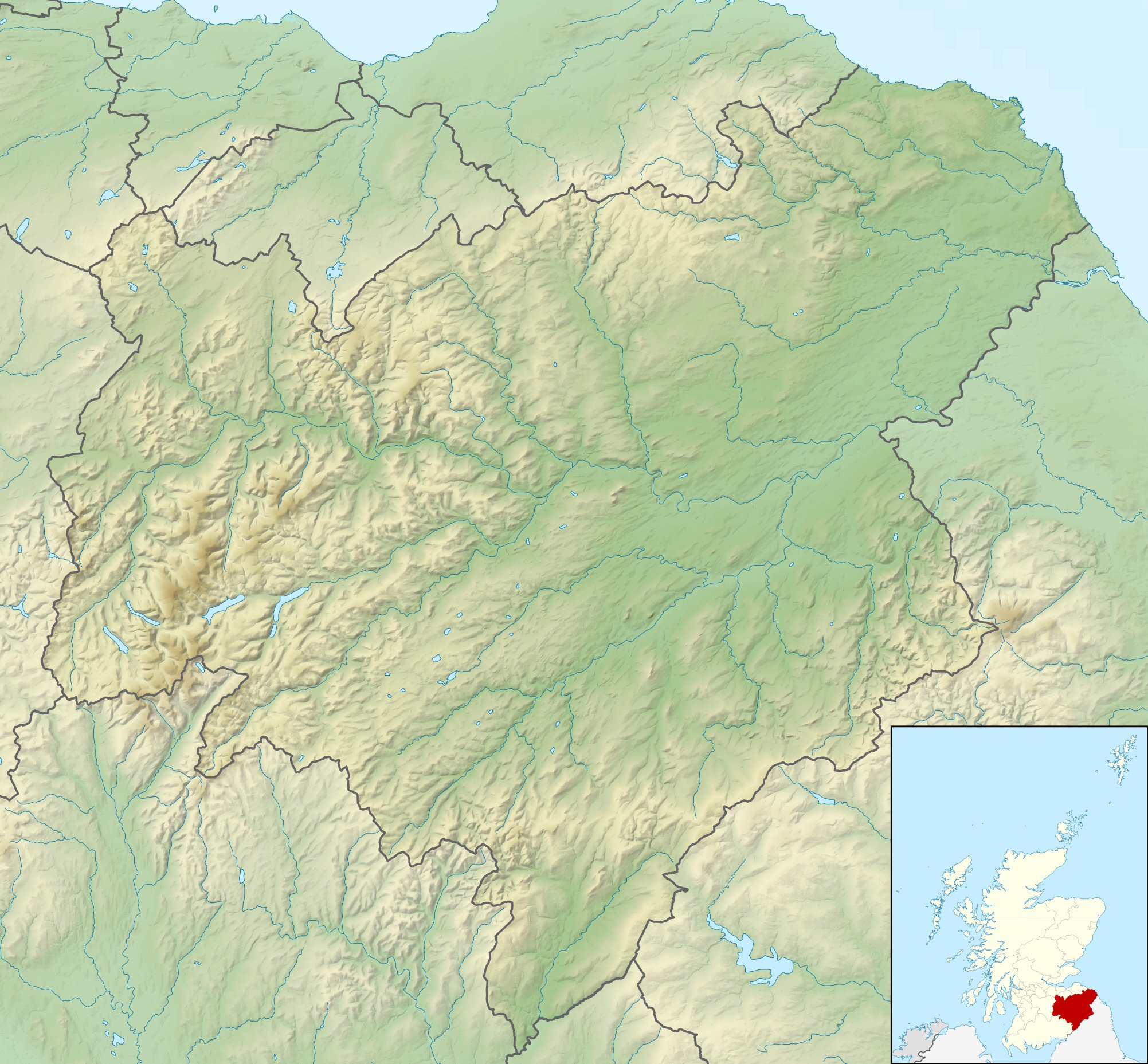
- Location within Scottish Borders
- Location: Scottish Borders
- Coordinates: 55.58134°N 2.71855°W
- Area: 39 km^{2} (15 sq mi)
- Established: 1981
- Governing body: NatureScot

It is possible that the hills were formed deep beneath the Earth's surface as ancient laccoliths.

Excavations have revealed evidence that the hill fort was occupied by 1000 BC, in the Bronze Age. The ramparts seem to have been built and rebuilt in three phases. 296 individual hut floors have been identified within the fort, suggesting a population of around 2000, and making it one of the largest known in Scotland from this period. The hill fort is thought to have been the capital of the Selgovae, who lived in upper Tweeddale prior to the arrival of the Romans.

In the 1st century AD the Roman army built the massive fort of Trimontium at Newstead, named after the three peaks, at the foot of the hill on the bank of the River Tweed. In association with this fort they constructed a signal tower with a tiled roof in a 15 m diameter enclosure built on the summit of Eildon North Hill. The hill fort may have been abandoned by this time, as Roman archaeological finds uncovered during excavation of the site in 1986 all overlaid native finds. The tower was thought to have been constructed out of timber during the Flavian period, with a later tower being constructed out of stone during the reign of Emperor Antoninus Pius. Finds including Roman coins and pottery have suggested that some of the house platforms were again in use in the 2nd to 4th century.

There is some evidence that prehistoric peoples regarded the Eildon Hills as a holy place and scholars believe they may have been a place of ceremonial gatherings. There are several holy springs around the base of the hills, now dedicated to Christian saints, but probably originally sacred to Celtic deities.

They were once known as Eldune, derived from the 12th-century Simeon of Durham who referred to them as Eldunum. The final part of the word is Old English dun, meaning a rounded hill, while the first part has been variously etymologized as Brittonic eil (referring to a fenced enclosure) or Old English ǣled ("fire") or ǣlǣte ("empty place").

== In folklore and media ==
Eildon is said to be a "hollow hill", and is mentioned in the legend of Thomas the Rhymer. Some believe Thomas went under the hill itself, and certainly part of the ballad occurs in the vicinity. Sir Walter Scott tells the tale of a horse dealer who is paid in "ancient coin" by an elderly buyer in old-fashioned dress and taken inside the hill at night. A host of armed knights lie asleep at their horses' feet; their sleeping leader is King Arthur. Shown a horn and a sword, in confusion the dealer blows the horn: the men begin to awake and a loud voice indicates that he has been proved a coward for not seizing the sword first. A whirlwind ejects him from the chamber and outside he tells his story to some shepherds before dropping dead of exhaustion. Scott identifies the elderly man as Thomas the Rhymer. Another legend concerns the Eildon Tree Stone, a large moss-covered boulder near Melrose, marking the spot where the Fairy Queen led Thomas into her realms in the heart of the hills.

The volcanic rock was said to have been cleft in three by the wizard Michael Scot, as relayed by Walter Scott in his 1805 poem, The Lay of the Last Minstrel:

In these far climes it was my lot
To meet the wondrous Michael Scott,
A wizard, of such dreaded fame,
Than when, in Salmanca's cave,
Him listed his magic wand to wave,
The bells would ring in Notre Dame!
Some of his skill he taught to me;
And Warrior, I could say to thee
The words that cleft Eildon hills in three,
And bridled the Tweed with a curb of stone:
But to speak them were a deadly sin.

James Hogg retold the legend in his 1823 novel The Three Perils of Man.

The hill was cited in the lyric of the song "Eiledon", from Big Country's The Seer album.

== See also ==
- List of places in the Scottish Borders
- List of places in Scotland
