= Gordon railway station =

Gordon railway station may refer to:

- Gordon railway station (North British Railway)
- Gordon railway station, Sydney
- Gordon railway station, Victoria

== See also ==
- Gorton railway station, in Manchester, England
- Gorton railway station (Scotland), a former station
