= Duns railway station =

Disused railway station in Duns, Scottish Borders

Duns
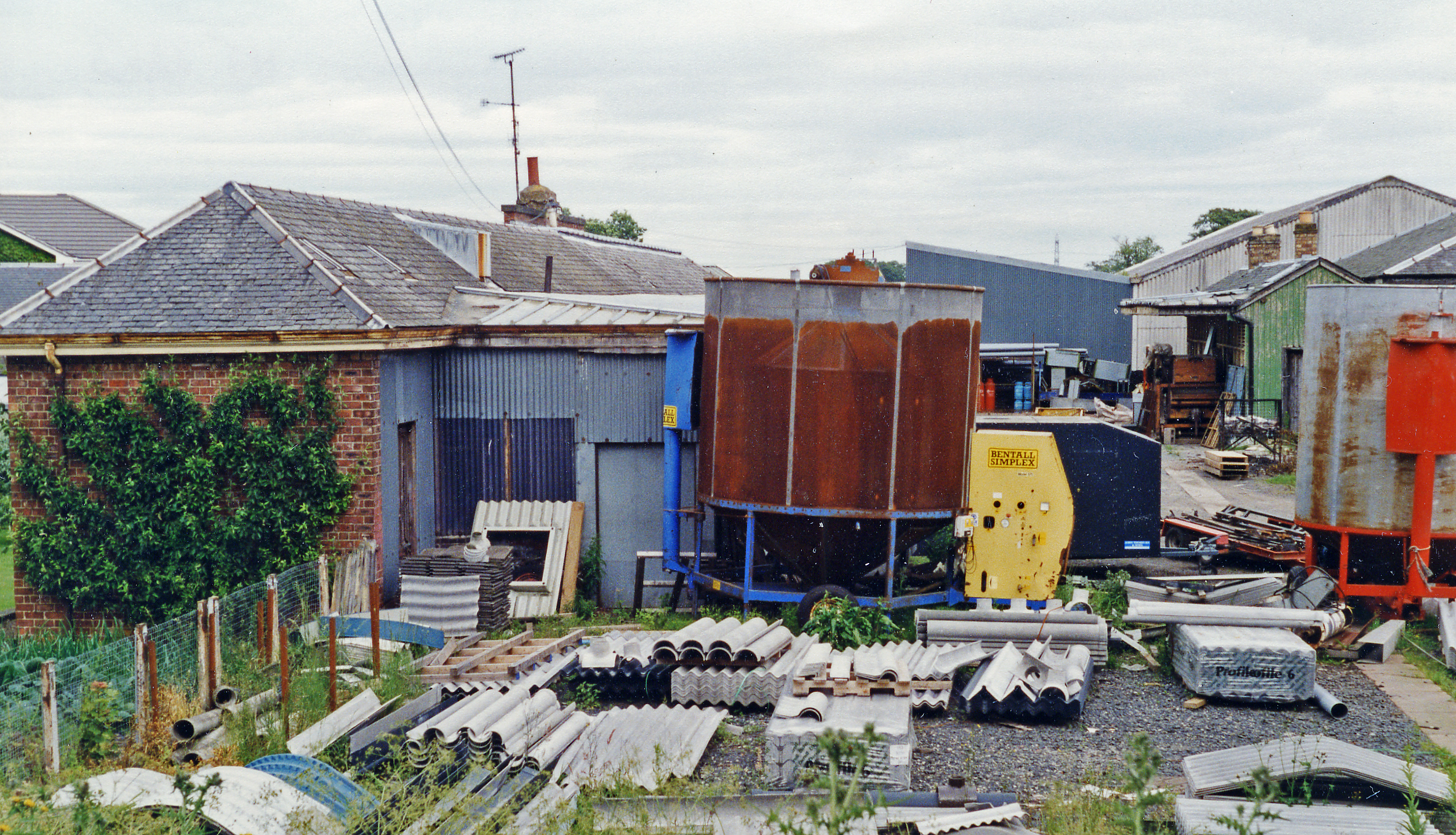
- The site of Duns station in 1997

General information
- Location: Duns, Scottish Borders; Scotland
- Coordinates: 55.7717°N 2.339°W
- Grid reference: NT788532
- Platforms: 2

Other information
- Status: Disused

History
- Original company: North British Railway
- Pre-grouping: North British Railway
- Post-grouping: LNER British Rail (Scottish Region)

Key dates
- 13 August 1849: Opened as Dunse
- May 1883: Renamed Duns
- 10 September 1951: Closed for passengers
- 7 November 1966: Closed for freight
Location

Duns railway station served the town of Duns, Scottish Borders, Scotland from 1849 to 1951 on the Berwickshire Railway.

== History ==
The station opened on 13 August 1849 as Dunse station by the North British Railway. The name was changed to Duns in May 1883. The building on the up platform shared a building with the wooden goods shed. The St Boswells-Duns portion of the line closed due to flooding on 13 August 1948. The station was closed for passengers on 10 September 1951.

Preceding station	Disused railways	Following station
Crumstane; Line and station closed	North British Railway; Berwickshire Railway	Marchmont; Line and station closed
