= Trimontium =

Trimontium may refer to:

- Trimontium (Newstead), an ancient Roman fort at Newstead, Borders, Scotland
- Plovdiv, Bulgaria, the capital of the ancient Roman province of Thrace
