= Greenlaw railway station =

Disused railway station in Greenlaw, Scottish Borders

Greenlaw
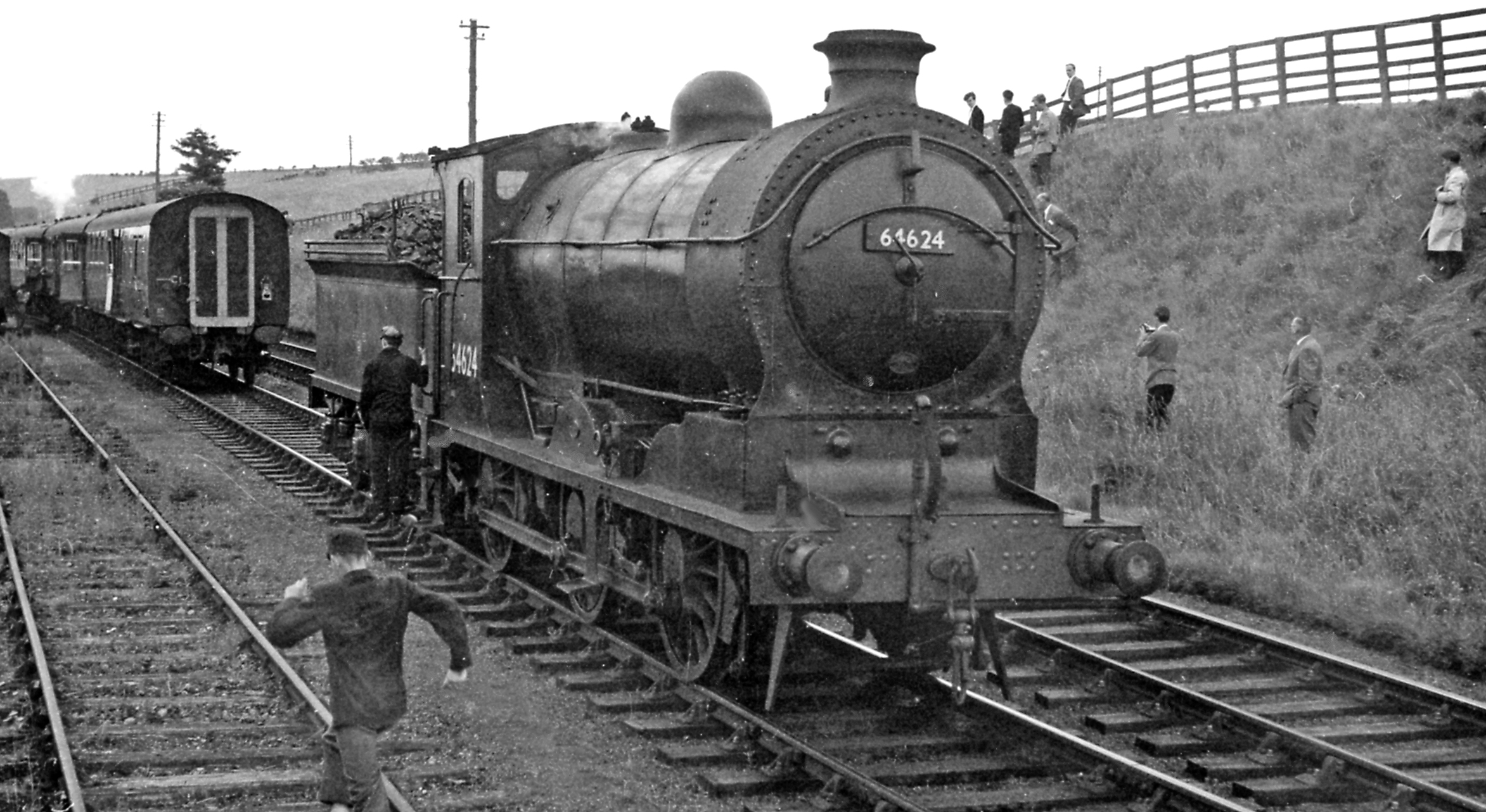
- An NBR J37 0-6-0 near the site of the station in 1961

General information
- Location: Greenlaw, Scottish Borders; Scotland
- Coordinates: 55.702223°N 2.465208°W
- Grid reference: NT708455
- Platforms: 2

Other information
- Status: Disused

History
- Original company: Berwickshire Railway
- Pre-grouping: Berwickshire Railway North British Railway

Key dates
- 16 November 1863: Opened
- 13 August 1948: Closed for passengers
- 19 July 1965: closed for goods traffic
Location

Greenlaw railway station served the town of Greenlaw, Scottish Borders, Scotland from 1863 to 1948 on the Berwickshire Railway.

== History ==
The station opened on 16 November 1863 by the Berwickshire Railway. The station was situated immediately east of a new road which now bypasses the building and the road overbridge which also survives. The station closed to passengers on 13 August 1948 but goods traffic continued until 1965. The station building survives and is a private residence. The platform has been landscaped as a garden.

Preceding station	Disused railways	Following station
Marchmont; Line and station closed	Berwickshire Railway	Gordon (NBR); Line and station closed
