= Chirnside railway station =

Disused railway station in Chirnside, Scottish Borders

Chirnside
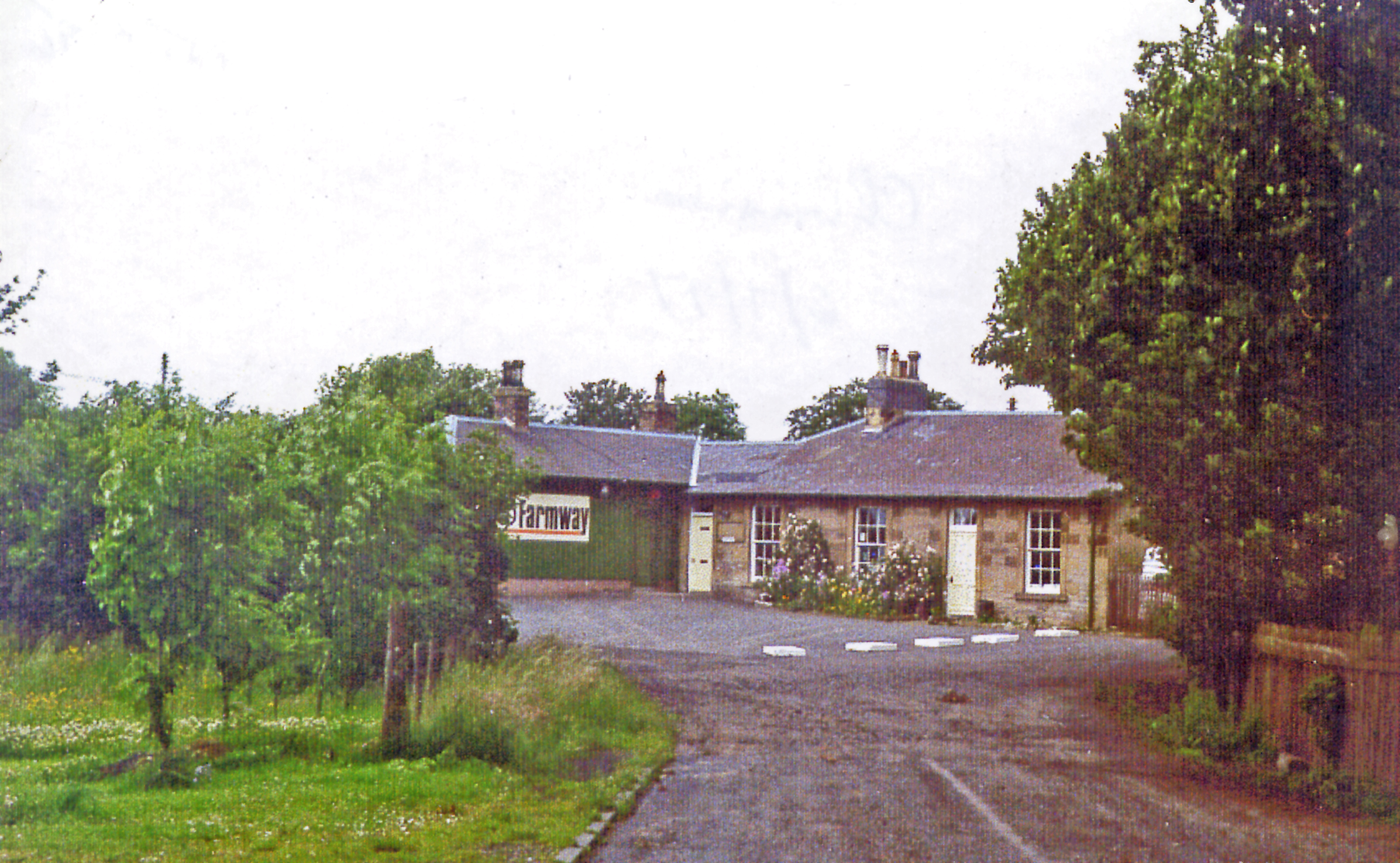
- The station house in 1997

General information
- Location: Chirnside, Scottish Borders; Scotland
- Coordinates: 55.8041°N 2.2371°W
- Grid reference: NT852567
- Platforms: 1

Other information
- Status: Disused

History
- Original company: North British Railway
- Pre-grouping: North British Railway
- Post-grouping: LNER; British Rail (Scottish Region)

Key dates
- 1863: Opened
- September 1951: Closed to passengers
- 1965: Closed completely
Location

Chirnside railway station served the village of Chirnside, Scottish Borders, Scotland from 1863 to 1965 on the Berwickshire Railway.

== History ==
The station opened in 1863 by the North British Railway. The station was situated north of Chirnsidebridge Paper Mill and adjacent to Chirnside Mill. The station closed to passengers in September 1951 and to goods traffic in 1965. The stationmaster's house, office and station building survive.

Preceding station	Disused railways	Following station
Reston (1st station); Line and station closed	North British Railway; Berwickshire Railway	Edrom; Line and station closed
