= Drygrange Old Bridge =

Bridge in the Scottish Borders, Scotland

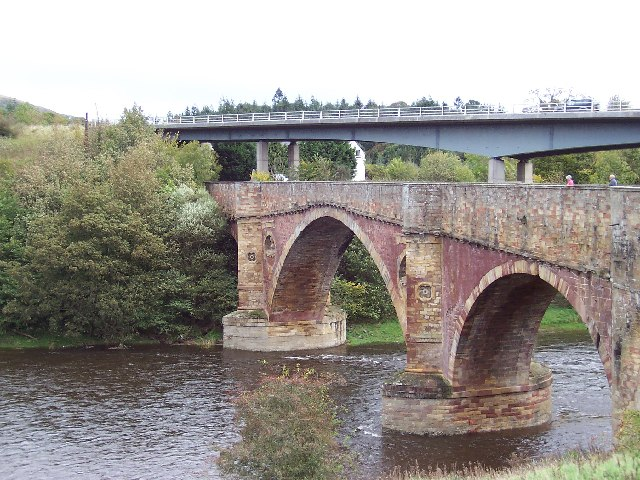
- Coordinates: 55.603915°N 2.675603°W
- Crosses: River Tweed

Characteristics
- Material: Stone
- Longest span: 105 feet (32 m)
- No. of spans: 4

History
- Construction start: 1776
- Construction end: 1780

Listed Building – Category A
- Official name: Drygrange Old Bridge
- Designated: 15 March 1971
- Reference no.: LB15106

Location
- Interactive map of Drygrange Old Bridge

The Drygrange Old Bridge is a disused road bridge over the River Tweed near Melrose in the Scottish Borders.

== History ==
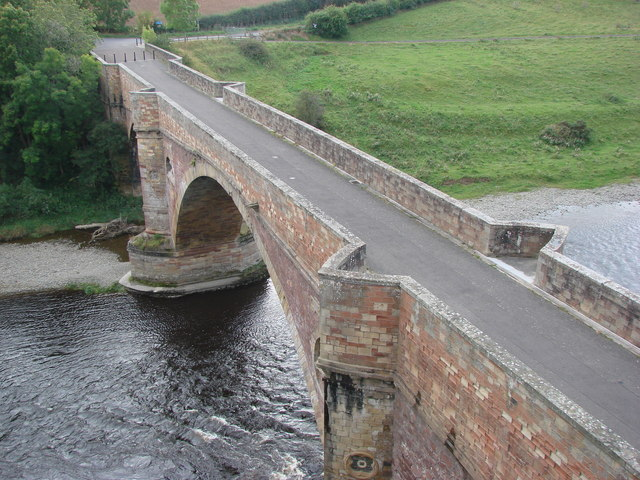
View of the bridge, now closed to vehicles

It was built between 1776 and 1780 to a design by Scottish architect and engineer Alexander Stevens. It replaced a ferry as part of an improvement to a turnpike road.

It was listed as a Category A listed building in 1971.

It carried the A68 over the Tweed until 1974 when it was replaced by a box girder bridge to the east, engineered by Sir Alexander Gibb & Partners. The old bridge is not open to vehicles, but can be crossed by pedestrians and bicycles.

== Design ==
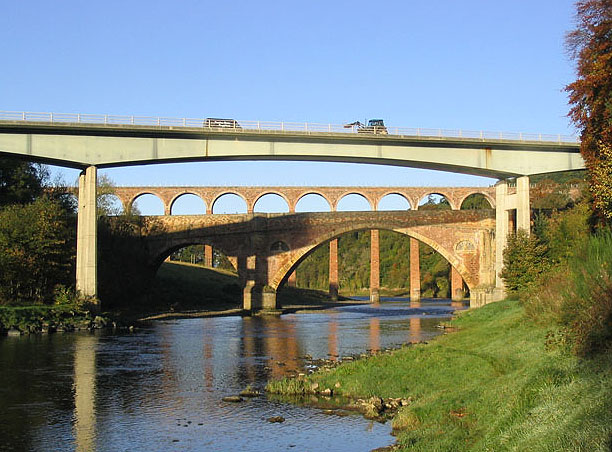
"Tripontium" (‘three bridges’), with the new concrete road bridge in front of the Drygrange Old Bridge and the Leaderfoot Viaduct beyond

The Old Bridge has a central span of 105 feet (32 m), with two side spans of 55 feet (17 m), and a smaller arch in the south abutment. The central arch has a rise of 34 feet (10 m). The rounded cutwaters are carried up to the level of the roadway and are topped with angular pedestrian refuges.

Hollow spandrels reduce the weight of the structure, an innovation by Thomas Telford. The bridge has been modified by raising the level of the roadway on the approaches to make it more level, but the level of the original roadway can be seen in the string course on the exterior of the bridge.

It is near to the Roman settlement of Trimontium (‘three hills’ in Latin), which is to the south-west of the viaduct. To the west of the bridge is the Leaderfoot Viaduct, a disused railway viaduct, and to the east of the Old Bridge is its modern successor. This group of three bridges is sometimes known as Tripontium (‘three bridges’ in Latin), a modern version of the Roman name.

== See also ==
- List of bridges in Scotland
