= Earlston railway station =

Former railway station in Scotland

Coordinates: 55.6369°N 2.6758°W

Earlston
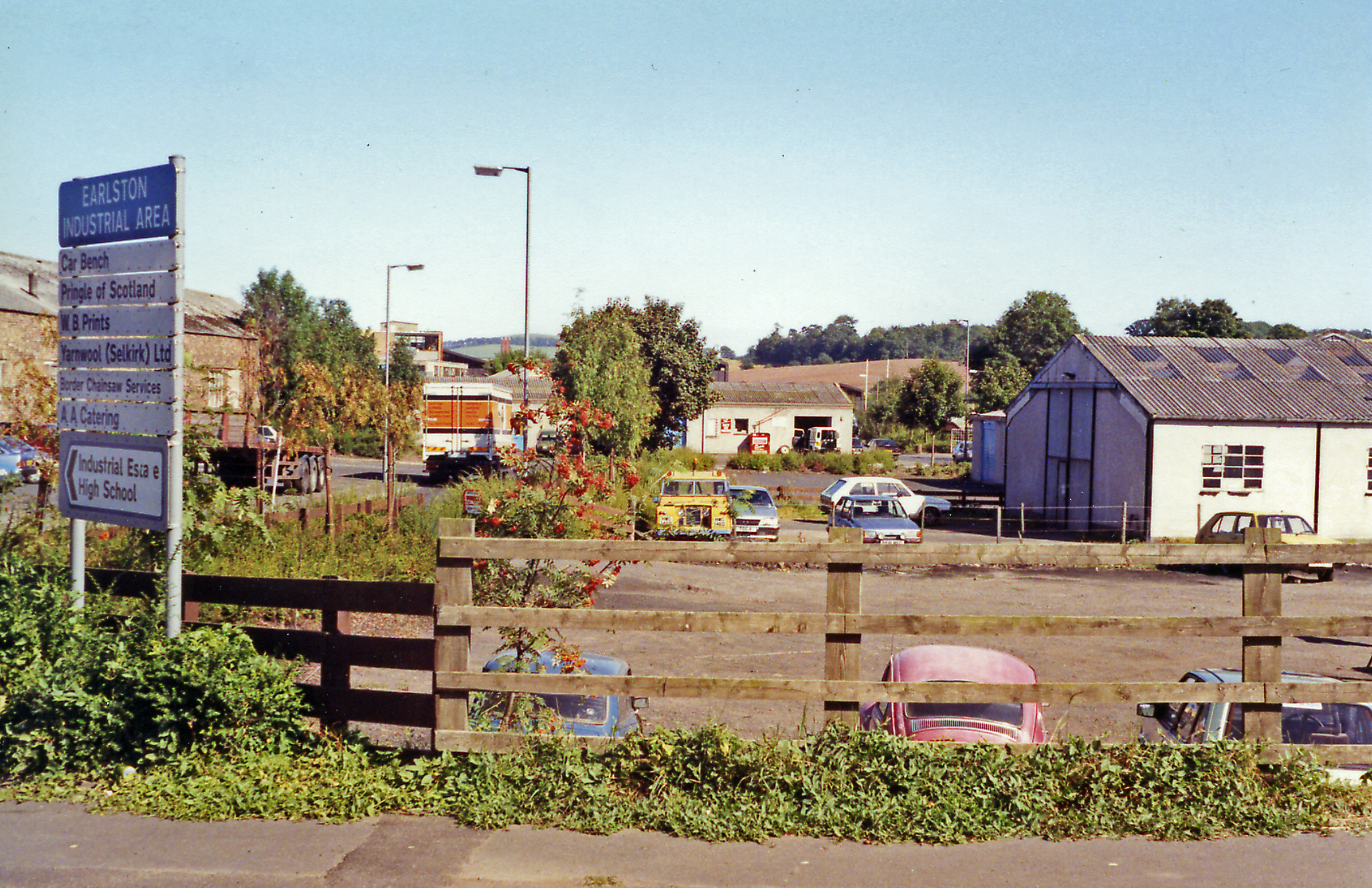
- Site of the station in 1991

General information
- Location: Scotland
- Platforms: 2

Other information
- Status: Disused

History
- Original company: Berwickshire Railway
- Pre-grouping: North British Railway
- Post-grouping: LNER British Rail (Scottish Region)

Key dates
- 16 November 1863: Opened
- 13 August 1948: Closed for passengers
- 19 July 1965: closed for freight
Location

Earlston railway station, in the Scottish Borders village of Earlston, was a station on the now disused Berwickshire Railway.There were two platforms (the location served as a passing loop) and two sidings, cattle dock, mackerel attic and goods shed. The station closed to passenger traffic in 1948, and the last freight service operated on Friday 16 July 1965. The station closed completely, along with the line, on Monday 19 July 1965.

| Preceding station | Historical railways | Following station |
|---|---|---|
| Gordon (NBR); Line and station closed | North British Railway; Berwickshire Railway | St. Boswells; Line and station closed |

== See also ==
- List of closed railway stations in Britain
