= Marchmont railway station =

Disused railway station in Marchmont, Scottish Borders

Marchmont

General information
- Location: Marchmont, Scottish Borders; Scotland
- Coordinates: 55.7331°N 2.3954°W
- Grid reference: NT752489
- Platforms: 1

Other information
- Status: Private home

History
- Original company: North British Railway
- Pre-grouping: North British Railway
- Post-grouping: LNER British Rail (Scottish Region)

Key dates
- 16 November 1863: Opened
- 13 August 1948: Closed
Location

Marchmont railway station served the estate of Marchmont, Scottish Borders, Scotland from 1863 to 1948 on the North British Railway.

== History ==
The station opened on 16 November 1863 by the North British Railway. The station was situated immediately north east of an unnamed minor road. A signal box and goods sidings were located near the station. The station closed to both passengers and goods traffic in 1948. The station building is still extant.

Preceding station	Disused railways	Following station
Duns; Line and station closed	North British Railway; Berwickshire Railway	Greenlaw; Line and station closed
