= Crimstone railway station =

Short-lived railway station in Duns, Scottish Borders

Crimstone

General information
- Location: Duns, Scottish Borders; Scotland
- Coordinates: 55.7747°N 2.3056°W
- Grid reference: NT809535
- Platforms: 2

Other information
- Status: Disused

History
- Original company: North British Railway
- Pre-grouping: North British Railway

Key dates
- 15 August 1849: Opened
- May 1852: Closed
Location

Crimstone railway station, also known as Crumstane railway station, served the town of Duns, Scottish Borders, Scotland, from 1849 to 1852 on the Duns branch line.

== History ==
The station was opened on 15 August 1849 by the North British Railway. To the east of the platforms was Crumstane Farm and a pair of sidings. The station closed in May 1852.

Preceding station	Disused railways	Following station
Reston; Line and station closed	North British Railway; Duns branch line	Duns; Line and station closed
