= Gordon railway station (North British Railway) =

Disused railway station in Gordon, Scottish Borders

Gordon (NBR)
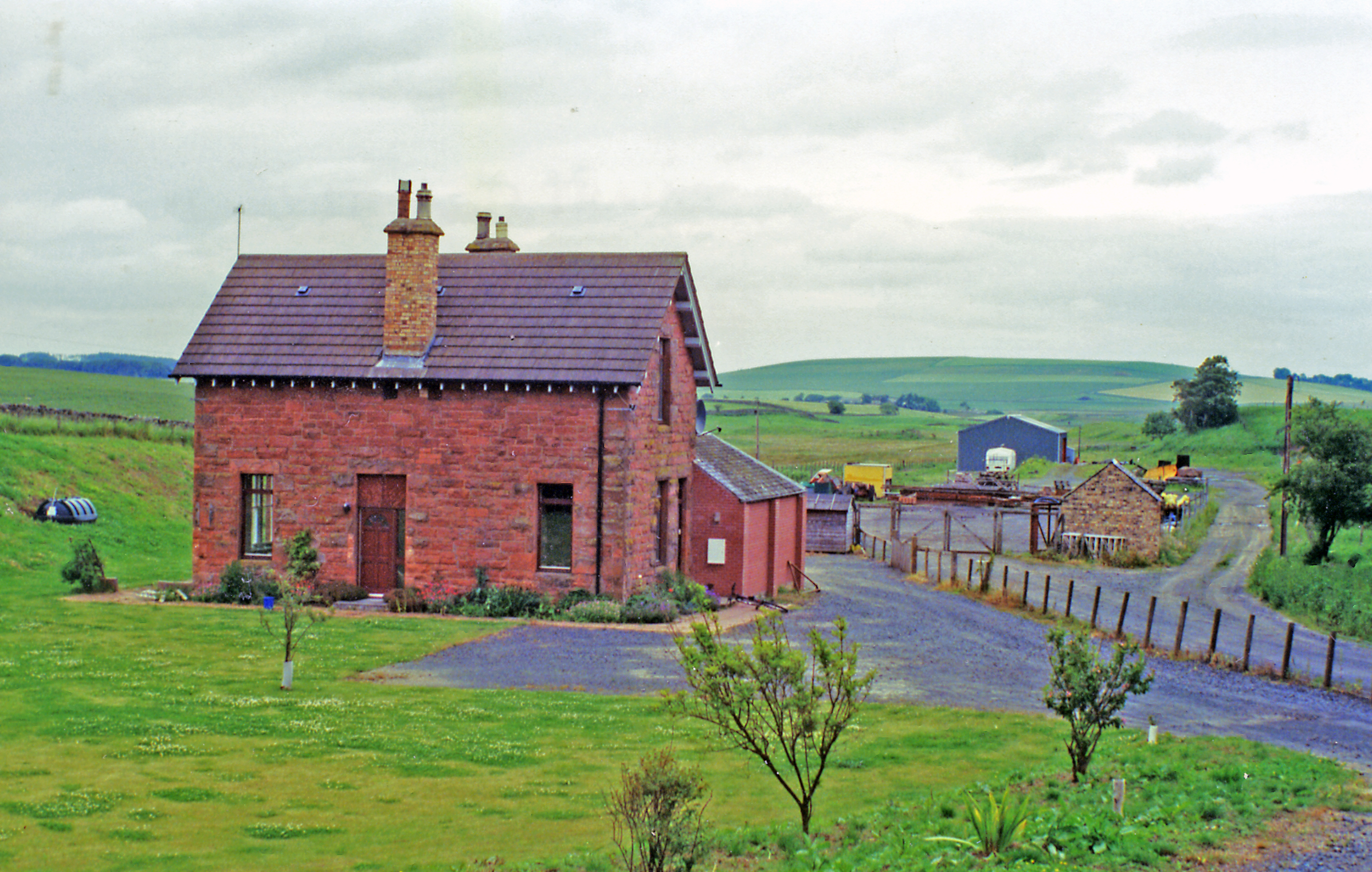
- Remains of Gordon station site, 1997

General information
- Location: Gordon, Scottish Borders; Scotland
- Coordinates: 55.6858°N 2.5624°W
- Grid reference: NT647437
- Platforms: 1

Other information
- Status: Disused

History
- Original company: North British Railway
- Pre-grouping: North British Railway
- Post-grouping: LNER British Rail (Scottish Region)

Key dates
- 16 November 1863: Opened
- 13 August 1948: Closed
Location

Gordon railway station served the village of Gordon, Scottish Borders, Scotland from 1863 to 1948 on the Berwickshire Railway.

== History ==
The station opened on 16 November 1863 on the North British Railway. It closed to both passengers and goods traffic on 13 August 1948.

Preceding station	Disused railways	Following station
Marchmont; Line and station closed	North British Railway; Berwickshire Railway	Earlston; Line and station closed
