= Trimontium (Newstead) =

Archaeological site in Scottish Borders, Scotland

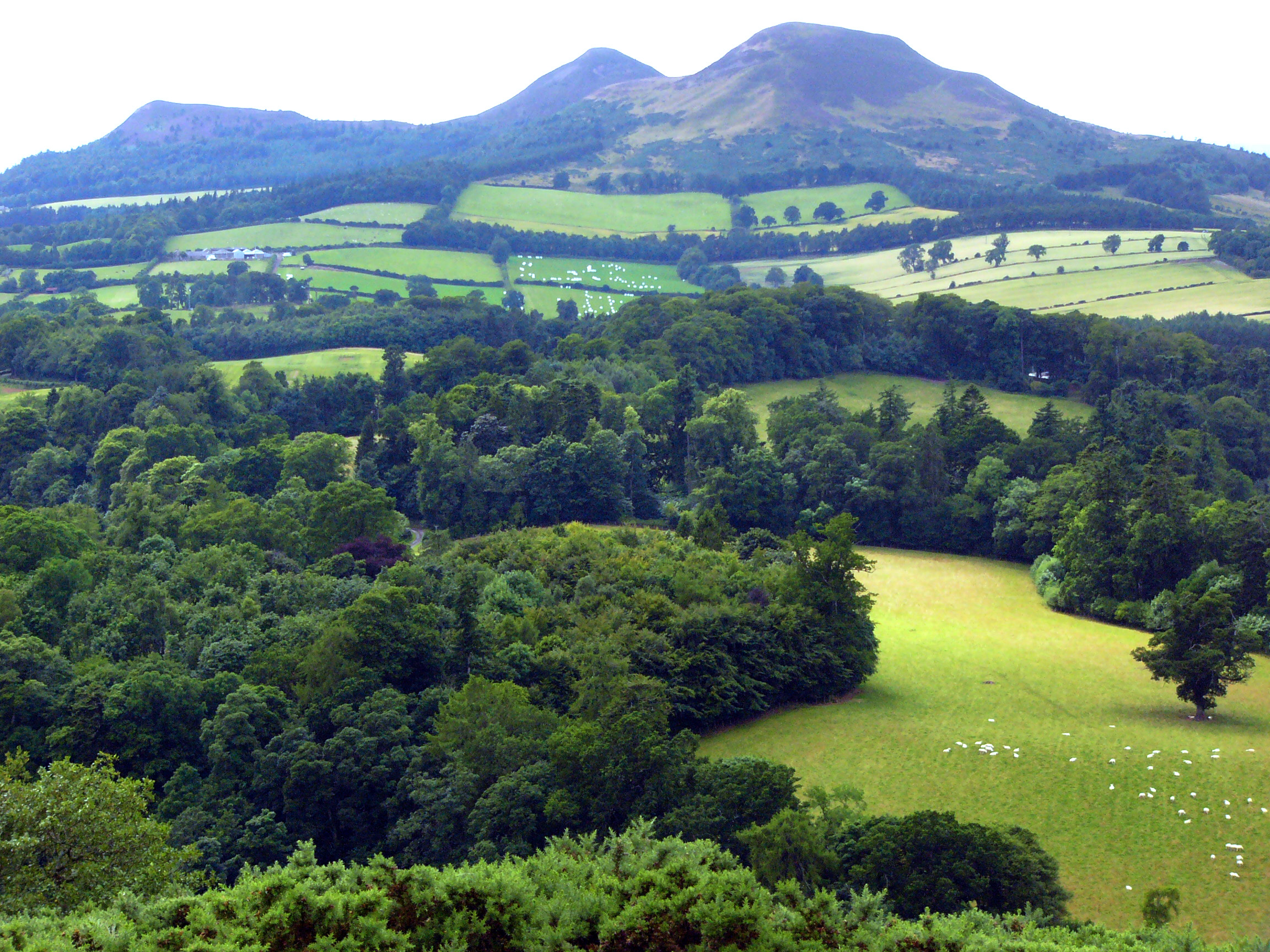
- Site of Trimontium with the three peaks of the Eildon Hills in the background

- Location within Scottish Borders
- 55.601°N 2.687°W
- Location: Melrose, Scottish Borders, Scotland

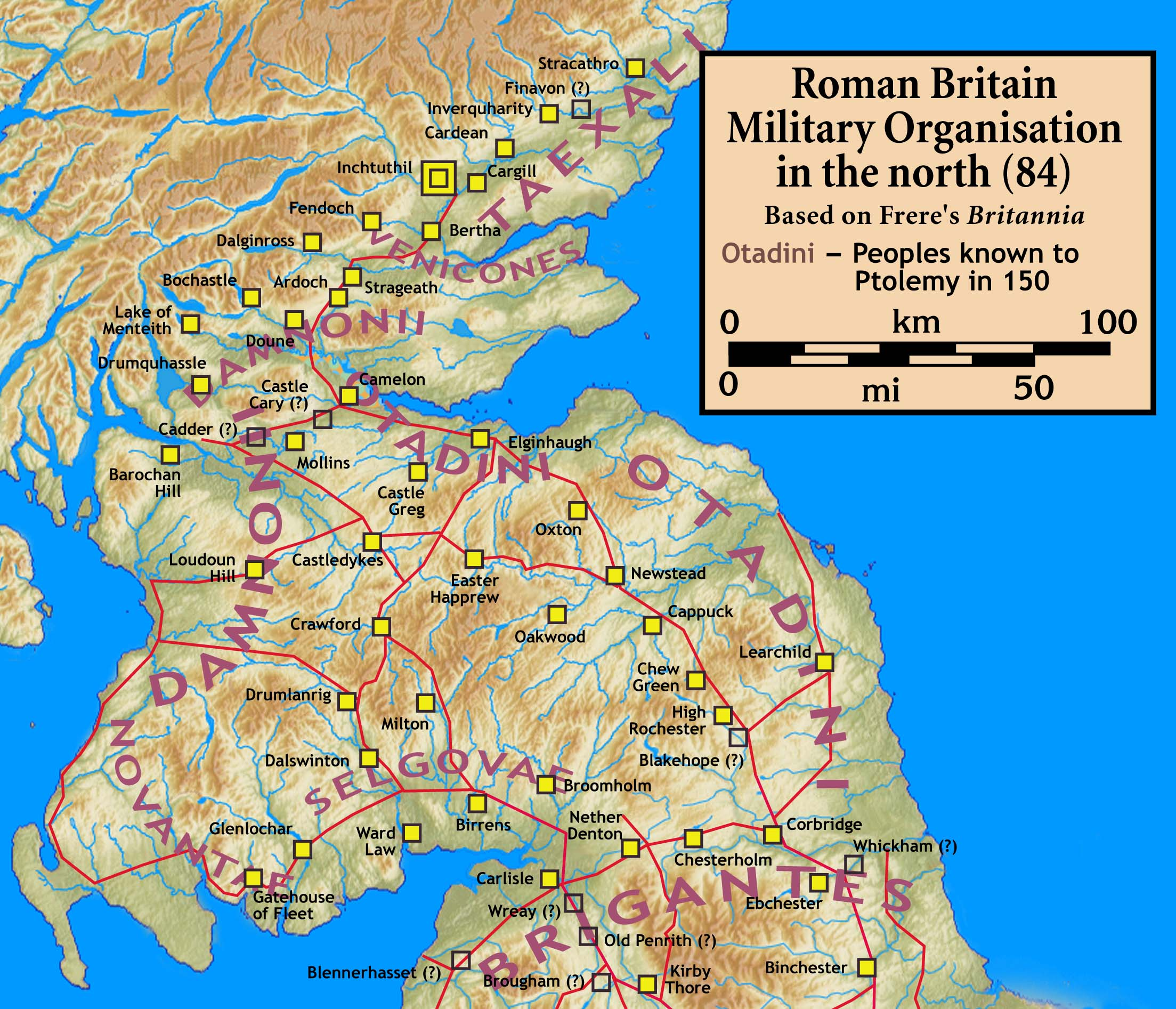
Roman roads and settlements 84 AD

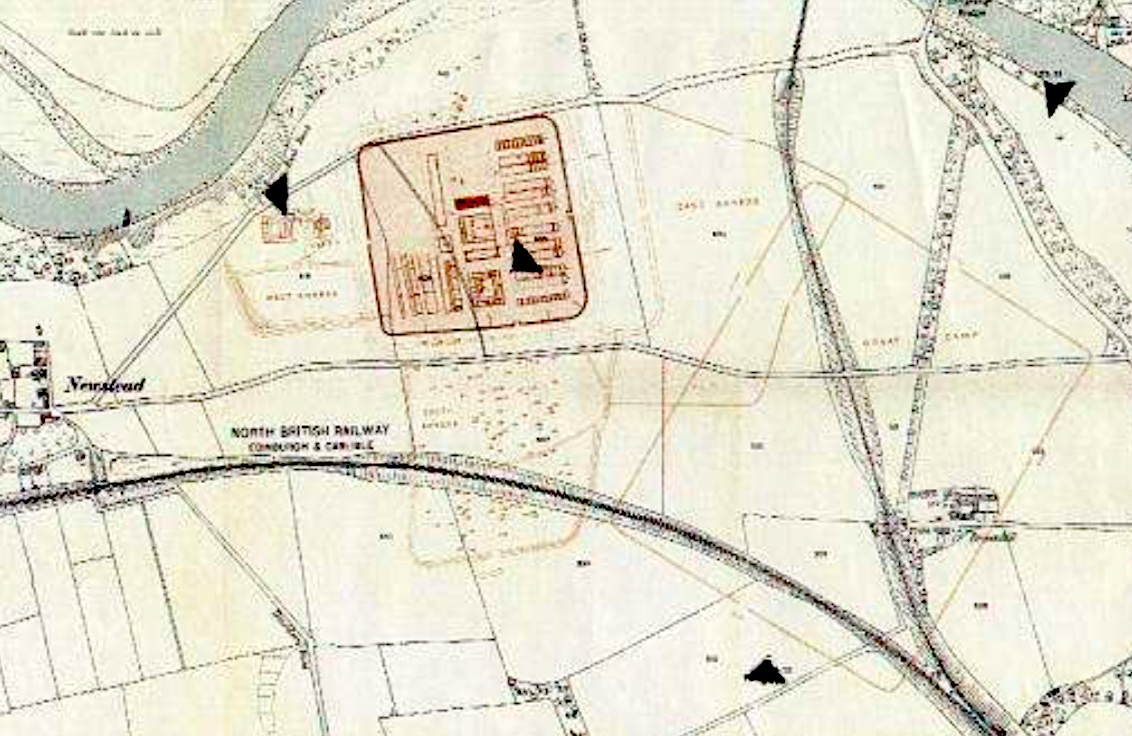
Plan showing annexes and "Great Camp"

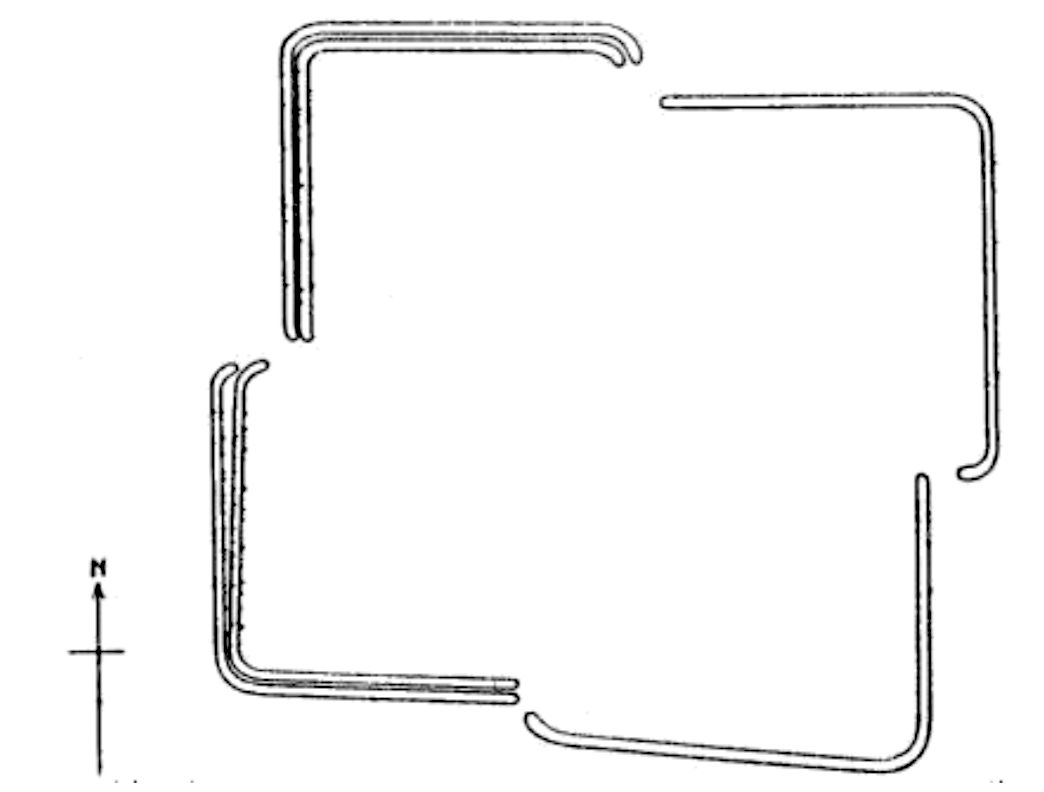
First fort defences

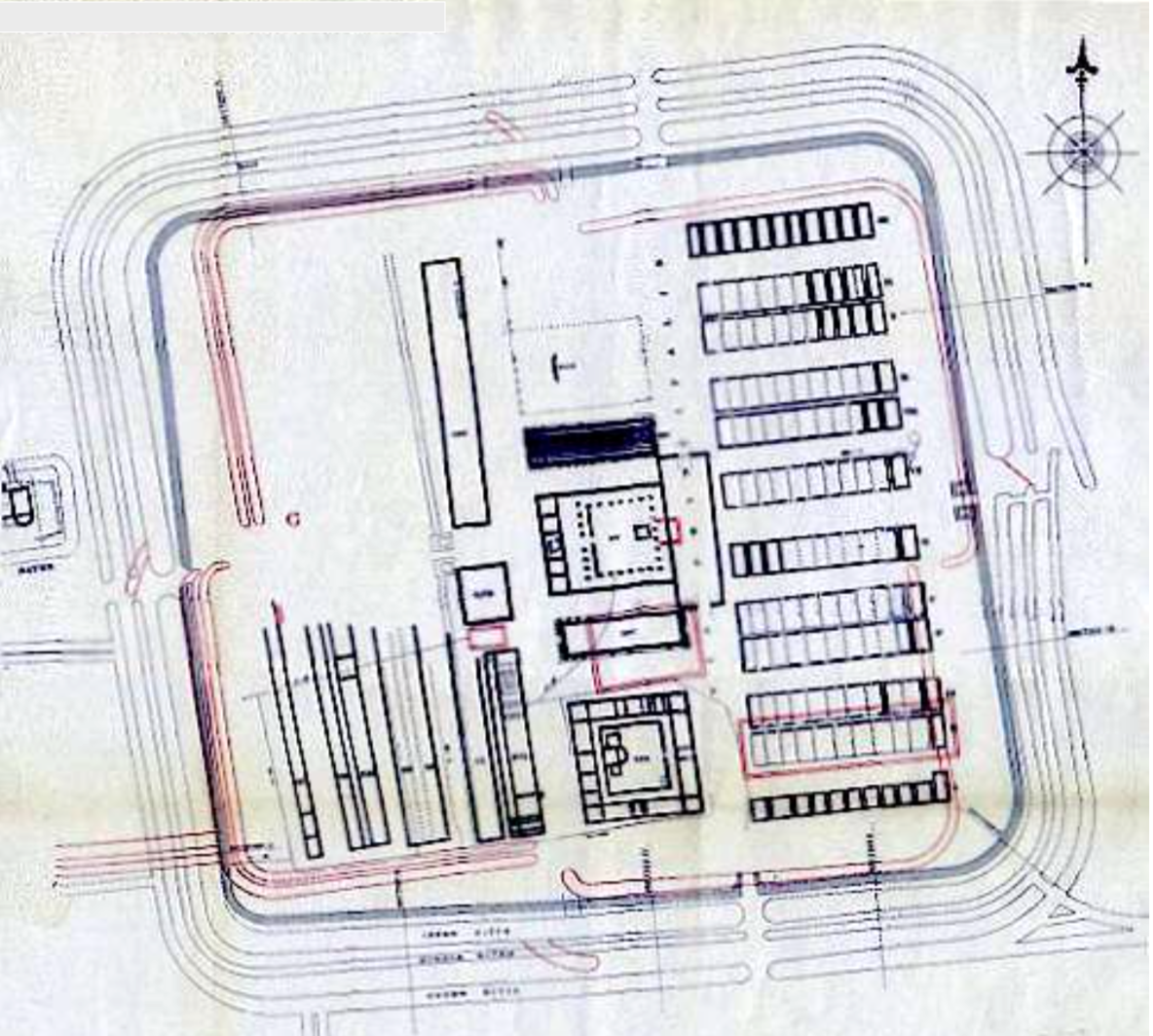
Plan; red lines show early defences

Trimontium was a Roman fort complex located at Newstead, near Melrose, in the Scottish Borders, beneath the three Eildon Hills which almost certainly gave it its name (Latin: trium montium, three hills).

It was occupied intermittently from about 79 to 184 AD and was the largest of the "outpost" forts after the construction of Hadrian's Wall in the 120s AD. It was located 60 mi (100 km) north of the wall on the extension of Dere Street the main Roman route to the north, initially in seemingly "hostile" territory. Trimontium was about three times larger than any fort on Hadrian's Wall and by 180 became the most northerly settlement of the whole Roman Empire.

Trimontium is also considered of international importance as the site of one of the largest caches of Roman military objects in Britain, found in 117 pits.

It was identified by Roman geographer Ptolemy in his Geography.

The fort sits on the banks of the River Tweed, with the Eildon Hills and the Iron Age hillfort atop Eildon North, a visible reminder of both the local population and imposing landscape of the Scottish Borders. The location benefitted from the rivers Tweed and Leader providing routes for the movement of goods and people and from the Roman road that became Dere Street passing alongside the fort.

== Historical background ==
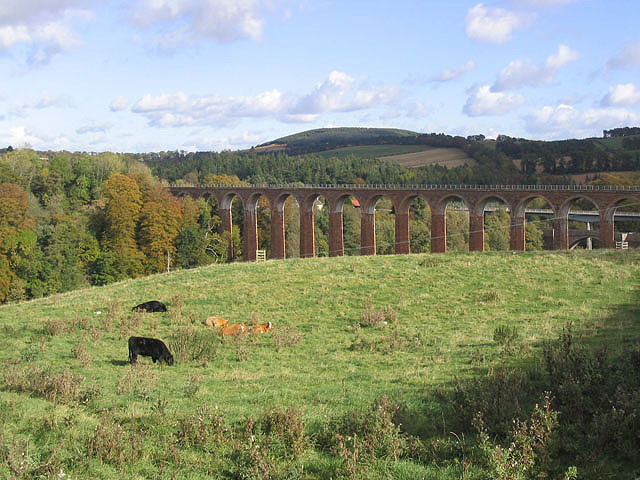
The Roman amphitheatre at Trimontium, with the modern Leaderfoot Viaduct behind

It took the Romans almost four decades, from the invasion of 43 AD and subsequent conquest of southern & eastern Britain, followed by expansion into northern England and Wales, to close in on southern Scotland when the fort was first constructed.

In 79 AD Roman general Agricola moved against the Brigantes of northern England and the Selgovae along the southern coast of Scotland, using overwhelming military power to establish Roman control. He built a network of military roads and forts, including Trimontium, to secure the Roman occupation. Existing forts were strengthened and new ones planted in northeastern Scotland along the Highland Line, consolidating control of the glens that provided access to and from the Scottish Highlands. The line of military communication and supply across southeastern Scotland and northeastern England was Dere Street (on which Trimontium was located) which was well-fortified.

After Agricola was recalled from Britain in 84 AD the Romans retired from northerm Scotland to a more defensible line along the Forth–Clyde isthmus.

Around 105 there appears to have been a serious setback at the hands of the tribes of the Picts: several Roman forts were destroyed by fire, with human remains and damaged armour at Trimontium indicating hostilities. Trimontium was abandoned and in the 120s Hadrian established the frontier further south by building his wall.

The fort's fortunes mirrored that of the later Roman expansion and retreat in the area, as its role swung from frontier post beyond Hadrian's Wall to supply and logistical waypoint for the Antonine Wall after 136, and back to frontier outpost from 164.

From its first construction phase in c.80 AD through to the last occupation and retreat shortly after 180 the fort would have been a focal point and centre of activity for both Romans and locals alike. The local Iron Age population, living in family farmsteads across the region, and gathering at times within the network of hillforts across the landscape would have had to develop a range of strategies to exist within or alongside the Roman presence. These could vary from alliance and trade to dispute and warfare.

== The Fort ==
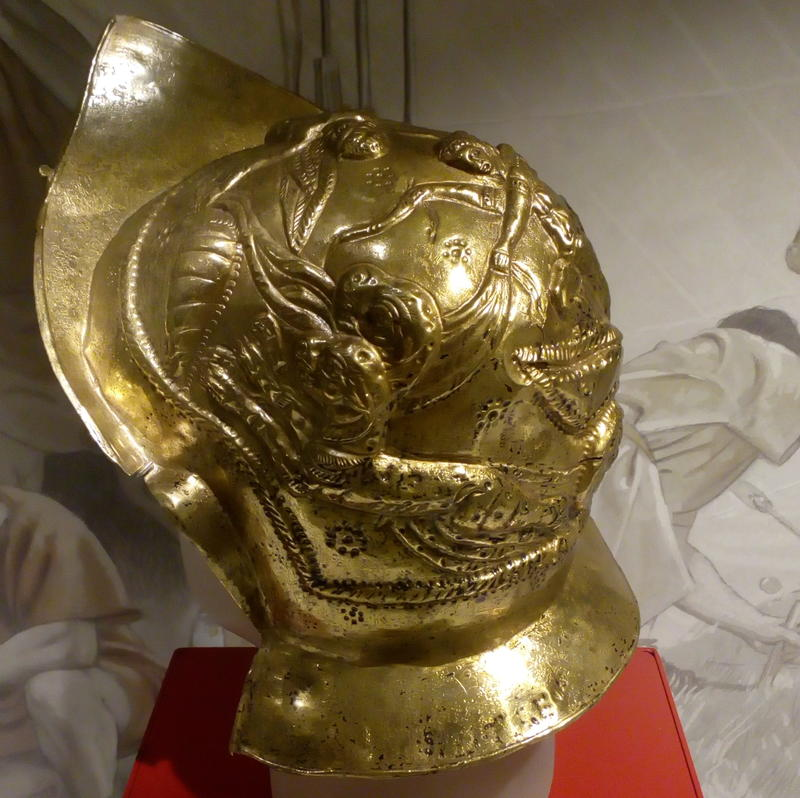
A bronze helmet found at Newstead near the Newstead Helmet

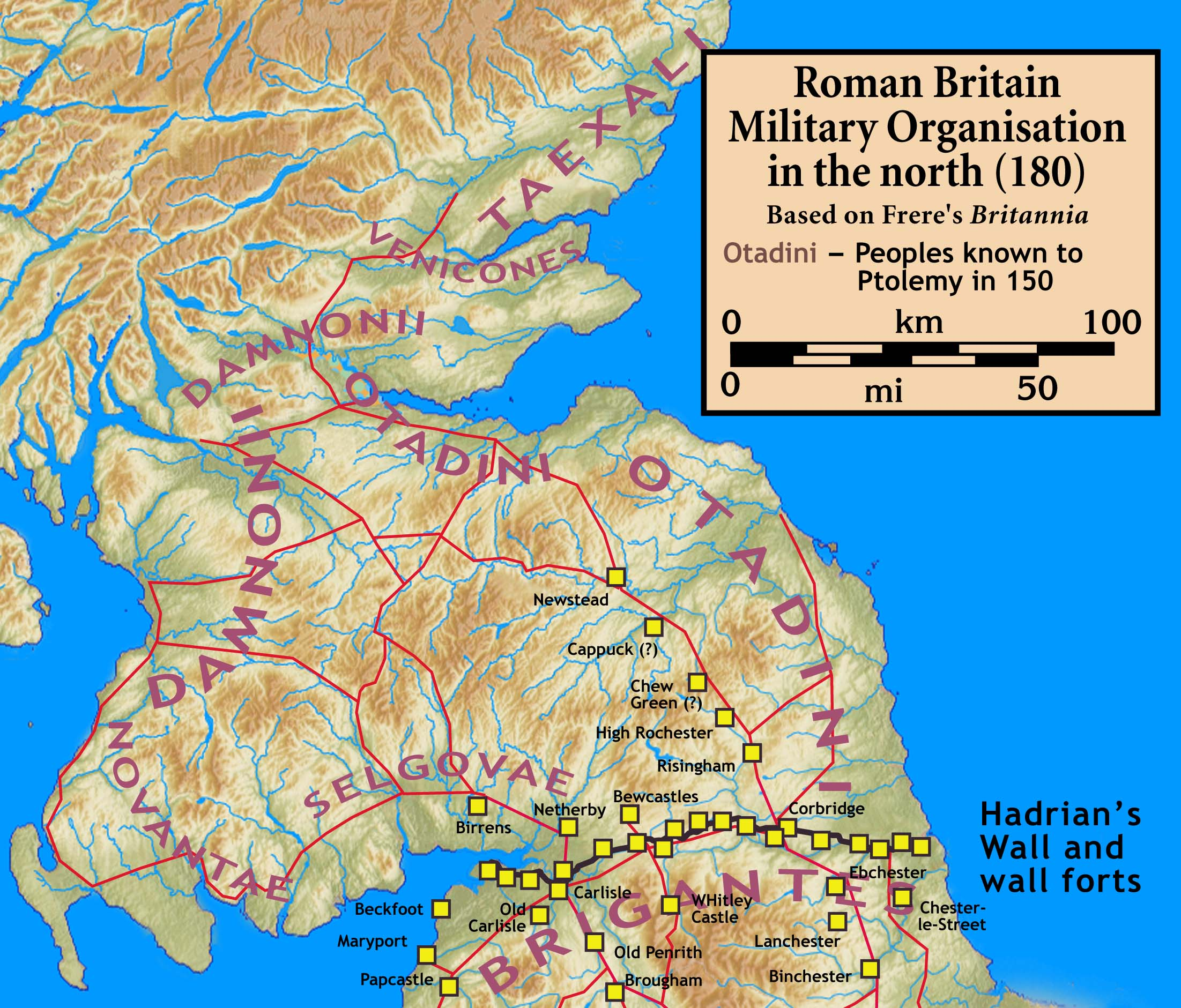
Forts in Roman Scotland 180 AD

The fort was constructed in multiple phases. Dr Simon Clarke of Bradford University has produced a logical sequence of building and destruction for the fort and its annexes. This was managed by combining evidence from the first excavations of James Curle and Sir Ian Richmond with aerial photographs and modern search and rescue excavations of Bradford University (1987–1997)

Phase 1 (c.79-87 AD): The earliest occupation of the site identified by aerial photographs since the 1940s have revealed at least three and possibly as many as five camps in this area. The enormous "Great Camp" identified by Curle was on the highest point of the ridge at the centre of the whole enclosure, commanding a view over the road from the Cheviots, and across the Leader valley to control the crossing of the river. It had an area of 49 acres (20 ha) and each of its 4 gates had a titulus, a long straight ditch for defence, dug in front of it. Its size means it must have been constructed for a large, probably legionary, force and its occupation must have been of short duration. In Scotland the only excavated camp that compares with it in size is the legionary fort at Inchtuthil of 56 acres (23 ha). In Wales, Caerleon of 50 acres (20 ha) occupied by the Second Legion, corresponds closely in area.

The later smaller Agricolan fort was built to the west of the Great Camp about 80 AD by the Legio XX Valeria Victrix mentioned on many of the inscriptions. It had a turf rampart on a cobble foundation with two ditches in front of it, overlapping each entrance. On the west side was an annexe which was also defended by a similar rampart and ditches arrangement.

Phase 2 (c.90-105 AD): After a possible short abandonment of the fort, the Romans were back, and building in strength. Old ditches were filled in and new defences constructed. This resulted in a colossal strengthening of the fort. The new turf rampart was built on a cobble base which measured 13.5 m across and around 8.4 m high. In front of this was a single ditch between 5 & 7 m wide and 2 to 4 m deep. New, well defended annexes appear on the south, east and probably north sides of the fort, inhabited by civilians and camp followers.

Phase 3 (c.105-137 AD): Trimontium was deserted as the Roman occupiers retreated south of Hadrian's Wall.

Phase 4 (c.138-139 AD): Clarke suggests that evidence points to the possibility that the fort was reoccupied a few years prior to the 140 AD advances into Caledonia by Emperor Antoninus Pius. If this is the case, the fort would have been a formidable outpost beyond Hadrian's Wall, with a civilian population within the annexes. Excavations and modern archaeology show the main entrance is now positioned through the southern annexe.

Phase 5 (c.140-158 AD): As the Roman presence pressed northwards and work began on the Antonine Wall (from 142 AD), the role of Trimontium changed. It was reduced in size with the building of a 2 m thick masonry wall through the main fort, though at the same time stone was used in the rebuilding. Manufacturing was becoming an important role for this newly purposed supply and logistics centre. Now behind the front line, it is believed that the civilian population attached to the fort may have numbered some 2–3,000.

Phase 6 (c.160 AD): Around this time the previous construction of the subdividing wall was removed as Trimontium's role changed from supply and manufacture to a front line fort due in part to the abandonment of the Antonine Wall. Within the fort a long, narrow barrack block was constructed and evidence points to a large decrease in the civilian population surrounding the fort.

Phase 7 (c.160-184 AD): As the civilian population surrounding and supporting the fort diminished further, the land that housed the annexes returned to a more natural state. The military presence reduced further, with the barrack block now housing the remaining soldiers and their families. The evidence points to the fort being deserted some time around 180 AD. It is unclear whether the remaining civilian population left at this time or remained, outside or even inside the fort. Evidence does point to the potential use of early 3rd and late 4th century coins in the area (coins have been found to the south and to the west of Newstead village). The local population may still have engaged in a Romanised trade and economic pattern of behaviour.

Evidence from the site indicate the presence of a considerable cavalry contingent at Trimontium. The list of such archaeological finds is extensive and includes horse skeletons, multiple parts of horse tack or harnesses, outstanding decorated cavalry parade helmets and face masks that can be seen at the National Museum of Scotland in Edinburgh, and intriguingly the prospect of a gyrus, or training ring.

During these phases of occupation, the population of the fort varied considerably, the permanent garrison level was probably around 1000 but this number would be complemented by the trades, manufacturers, craftsmen and families associated with the camp during the different phases of occupation. It has been estimated that the number could have risen to anywhere between 2000–5000.

== Site archaeology ==
The earliest modern reference to the archaeological significance of Trimontium stems from finds uncovered during mid-Victorian railway cutting works as part of the Waverley Line construction in 1846. As land to the east of the village of Newstead was worked, finds from pits full of Roman artefacts were uncovered.

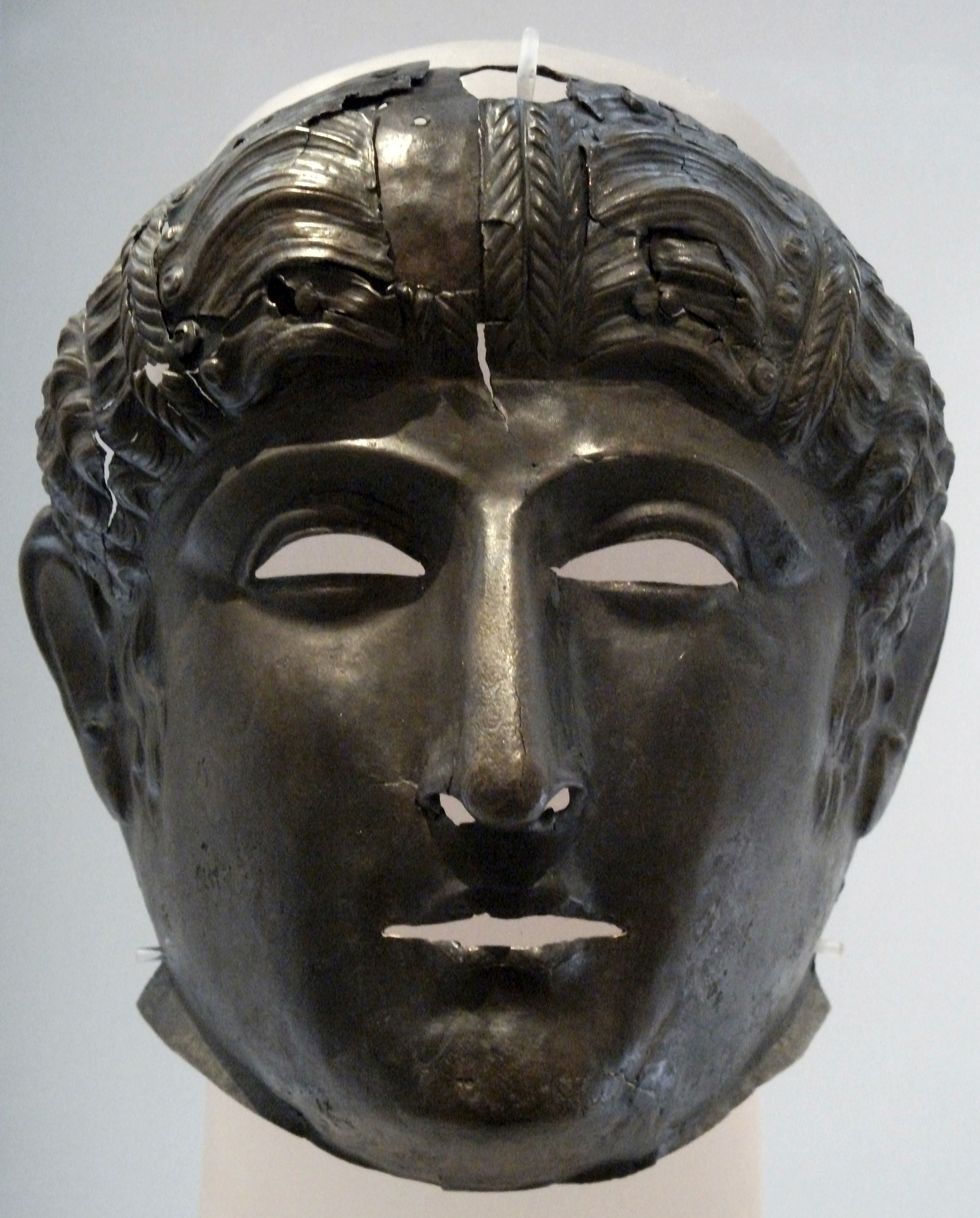
Bronze face mask from Trimontium, on display at the National Museum of Scotland, Edinburgh

Excavations by James Curle between February 1905 and September 1910 began the first exploration of the site, making many findings. These include foundations of successive forts described earlier, which throw much light on the character of this site, an unparalleled collection of Roman armour, including ornate cavalry parade (or 'sports') helmets, horse fittings including bronze saddleplates and studded leather chamfrons, numerous artefacts associated with trade and manufacture, building and construction, and daily life on the Roman frontier. In 1911 Curle published his archaeological findings in 'A Roman Frontier Post and its People'. This volume quickly became a standard reference work, ahead of its time and still the most decisive work published in Scotland covering this period of Roman occupation, expansion and retreat.

Sir Ian Richmond undertook small scale excavations and some re-interpretations of Curle's work in 1947. At this time, with the advent and development of aerial photography as a tool in modern archaeological research, Dr Kenneth St Joseph’s work at Trimontium revealed up to nine temporary encampments, evidenced through cropmarkings.

In 1989 The Newstead Project began, a 5-year archaeological investigation undertaken by the Department of Archaeological Sciences of Bradford University. Initially under the direction of Dr. Rick Jones, and thereafter Dr. Simon Clarke, the project employed the most modern archaeological techniques to the Trimontium site for the first time. Clarke uncovered forty major archaeological features in his 1994 'rescue excavation', including six deep pits containing a wealth of organic material. In 1996 he returned to the site to examine the suspected amphitheatre and suspected north annexe, and in 1997 the Bradford University team completed the geophysics survey of the Trimontium site.

== Museums ==
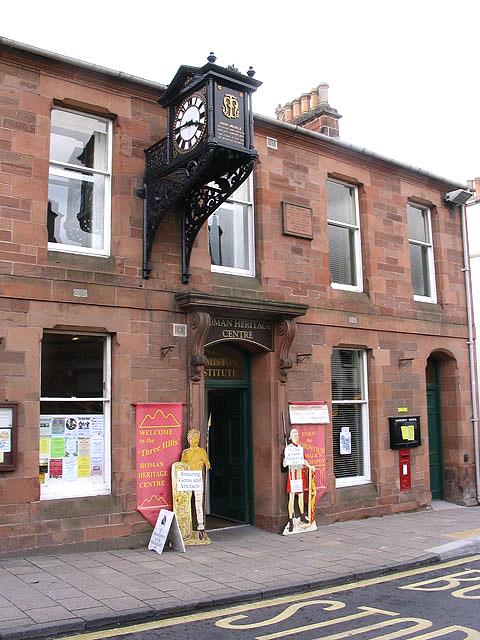
The Ormiston, Melrose - home of the Trimontium Trust Roman Museum has been redeveloped and reopened August 2021.

The Trimontium Trust run a museum local to the Trimontium site in the nearby town of Melrose. The museum's £1.4 million redevelopment was part of a project supported by the National Lottery Heritage Fund to enhance and extend the galleries, displays and interpretation of Trimontium's history. The trust carry out guided walks to the Trimontium site, run a lecture and talk series, undertake activities linked to local community events, and present school and family workshops.

Many of the original and later finds from Trimontium are of such quality and importance that they are displayed at the National Museum of Scotland in Edinburgh. Items such as the cavalry helmets and decorative face mask, horse chamfron, leather work and much else besides can be seen as well as other Roman finds.

The Trimontium Trust museum redevelopment project has seen key finds return to the vicinity of the original fort site & archaeological excavations. They are housed within this contemporary museum setting which extends, redesigns, reinterprets and re-displays objects telling the story of Trimontium and its relationship with the local population.

=== Patrons ===
Patrons of the Trimontium Trust include:

- HRH The Duke of Gloucester
- The Hon. Gerald Maitland-Carew CVO
- Andrew Hepburne Scott, Lord Polwarth
- James Curle's granddaughter, Lady Cameron
- Professor Lawrence Keppie.

== Bibliography ==
- FRASER HUNTER and LAWRENCE KEPPIE (edd.), A Roman Frontier Post and its People: Newstead 1911-2011 (NMS Enterprises Ltd. on behalf of Trimontium Trust; National Museums Scotland 2012). ISBN 978-1-905267-75-0
- Curle, J., 1911, A Roman Frontier Post and its People: The Fort of Newstead in the Parish of Melrose. Glasgow: James Maclehose and Sons.
- Elliot, W., 1994, The Trimontium Story. Selkirk: The Trimiontium Trust
- Curle, James (2023). Revealing Trimontium: the correspondence of James Curle of Melrose, excavator of Newstead Roman fort. Oxford: Archaeopress Archaeology. ISBN 9781803275154.
- Tacitus, Publius Cornelius (1897) [98], The Germany and the Agricola of Tacitus (revised translation, with notes), C. M. Barnes Company
