= Leaderfoot Viaduct =

Bridge in the Scottish Borders, Scotland

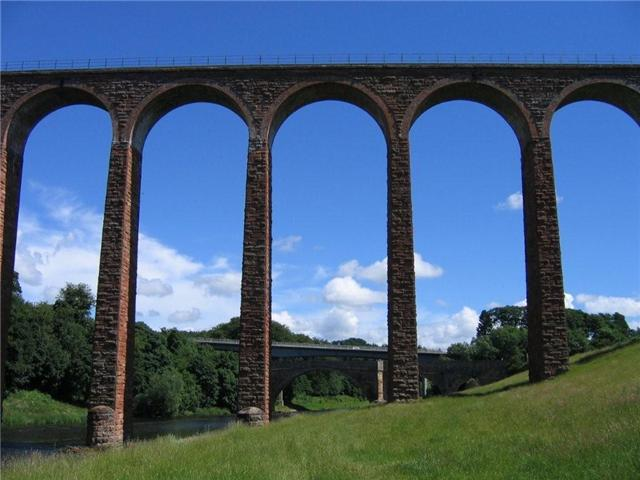
- Coordinates: 55.60443°N 2.677939°W
- Carries: Berwickshire Railway
- Crosses: River Tweed

Characteristics
- Material: Stone and brick
- Longest span: 43 feet (13 m)
- No. of spans: 19

History
- Opened: 16 November 1863

Listed Building – Category A
- Official name: Leaderfoot Viaduct
- Designated: 15 March 1971
- Reference no.: LB15145

Location
- Interactive map of Leaderfoot Viaduct

The Leaderfoot Viaduct, also known as the Drygrange Viaduct, is a railway viaduct over the River Tweed near Melrose in the Scottish Borders.

== History ==
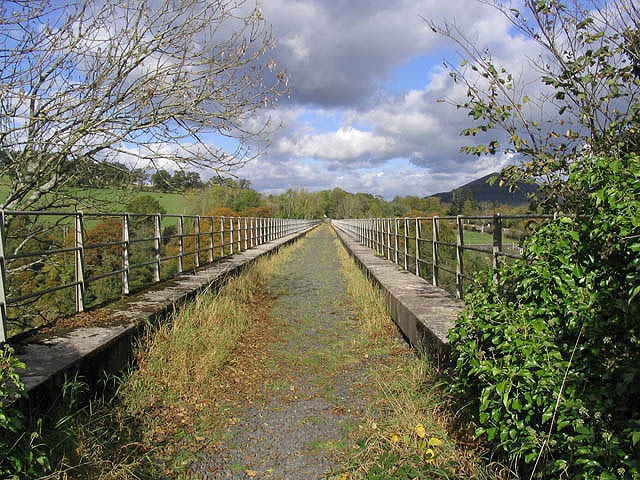
The disused trackbed

The viaduct was opened on 16 November 1863 to carry the Berwickshire Railway, which connected Reston with St Boswells, via Duns and Greenlaw.

The engineers of the railway were Charles Jopp and Wylie & Peddie.

The railway was severely damaged by flooding during August 1948, with 7 bridges on the line failing, and the line closed to passenger traffic on 13 August 1948. Freight trains continued to run across the viaduct as far as Greenlaw until 19 July 1965.

In 1981, the poor condition of the viaduct meant that it was due to be demolished.

It was upgraded from Category B to A listing in 1986. Historic Scotland took over control of the viaduct from British Rail in 1996.

== Design ==
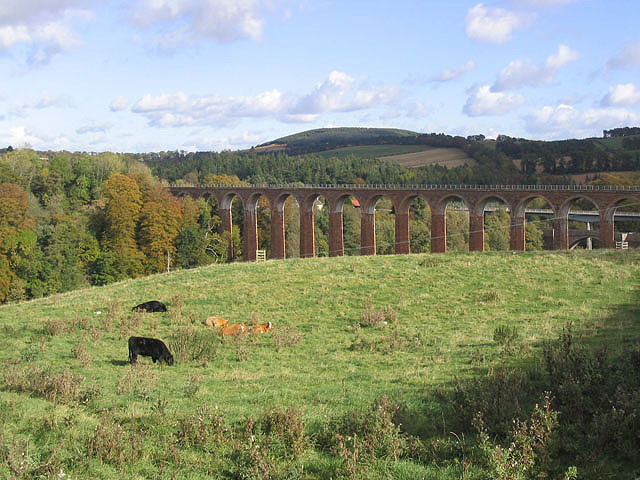
The viaduct behind the amphitheatre at the Roman site of Trimontium

The viaduct stands 126 feet (38 m) from the floor of the river valley. The arches, each 43 feet (13 m) span, are of brickwork, and the abutments, piers and walls are of rustic-faced red sandstone. Some later strengthening of the abutments and piers with old rails and buttresses on the southern valley side is very obvious. It is straight over its whole course, and runs in a broadly northerly direction.

The viaduct is in good condition, having been renovated between 1992 and 1995. Repairs included replacement of masonry and brickwork, grouting, and underwater repair to one of the cutwaters.

It is near to the Roman settlement of Trimontium, which is to the south-west of the viaduct. To the east of the viaduct are the Drygrange Old Bridge, a road bridge dating from 1776, and its modern successor. This group of three bridges is sometimes known as Tripontium. To the east of the viaduct, the River Leader flows into the Tweed from the north.

== In popular media ==
A portion of the 2023 film Indiana Jones and the Dial of Destiny was filmed at the viaduct, although the scene was said to be located in Switzerland.

== See also ==
- List of bridges in Scotland
