= Berwickshire Railway =

Former railway line in Scotland

The Duns Branch and the Berwickshire Railway together formed a through railway route from Reston, near Berwick-upon-Tweed, to St Boswells in the Scottish Borders. The line was promoted in two stages. The first was from Reston on the Edinburgh to Berwick main line to Duns (then spelt Dunse, and the county town of Berwickshire); it opened by the North British Railway in 1849.

The second section was promoted independently by the Berwickshire Railway Company, but with considerable assistance from the North British Railway. It opened most of its line in 1863, but delay in constructing a large viaduct, Leaderfoot Viaduct, led to the opening of the final section of the line being delayed until 1865.

The North British Railway had conceived the line as a strategic trunk route across southern Scotland, but this development was never realised, and the line was never heavily used.

During the violent rainstorm in the area in August 1948 the line was breached west of Earlston, and the passenger train service ceased permanently. Duns reverted to being a branch line terminus from Reston until that too was closed to passengers in 1951.

== The Duns branch line ==
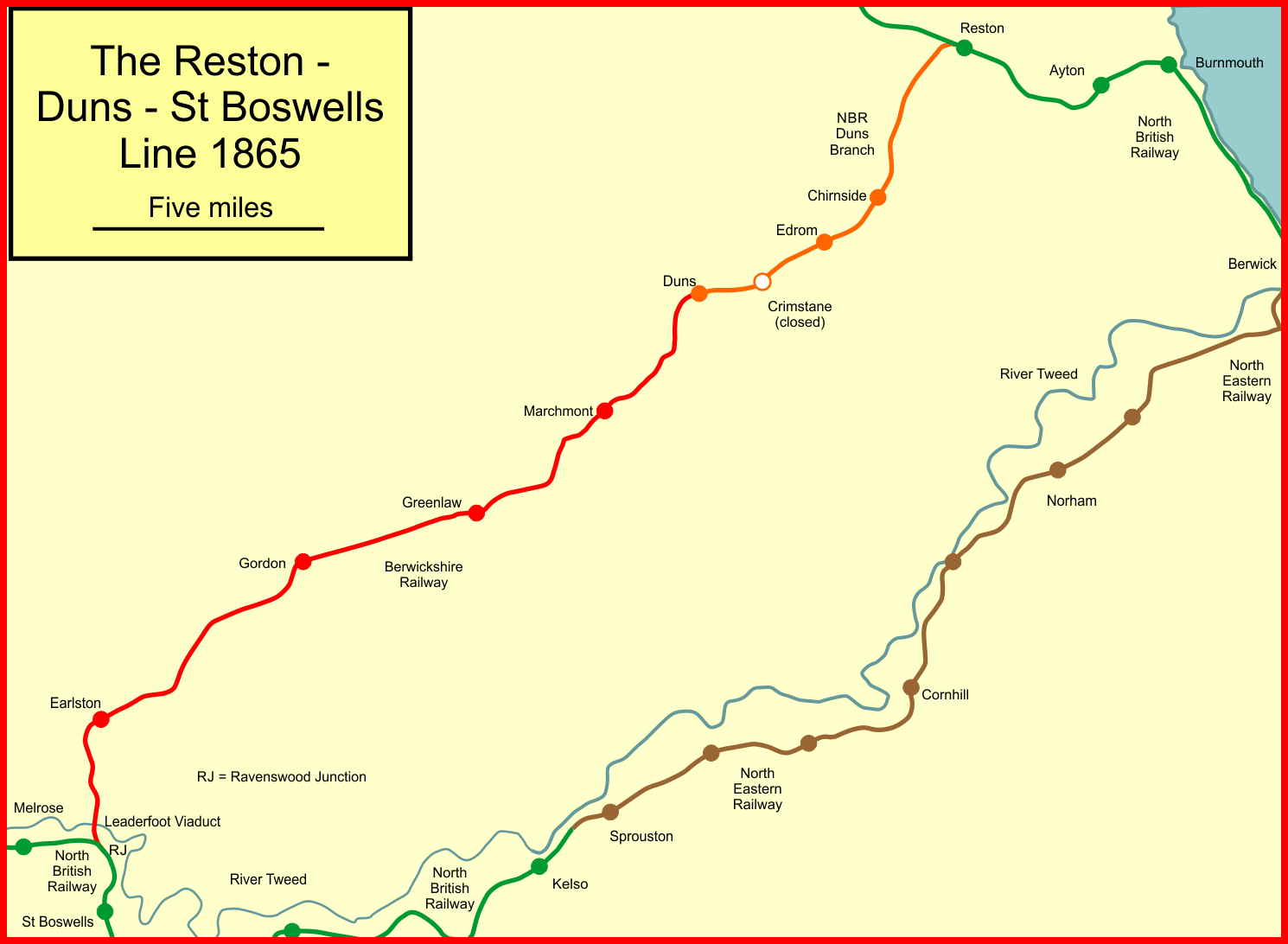
The Duns and Berwickshire Railway branches

The North British Railway (NBR) obtained an act of Parliament, the North British Railway Act 1844 (7 & 8 Vict. c. lxvi), giving authorisation for its main line from Edinburgh to Berwick (later called Berwick upon Tweed), and pressed ahead with constructing it. Equally urgently addressed by the directors, was the capturing of territory and the exclusion of competing railways. As part of that strategy, the NBR proposed numerous branch lines, and on 9 February 1846 a special shareholders' meeting approved the presentation of parliamentary bills for several branches, including one to Dunse (later known as Duns) from Reston, on the main line, a short distance north of Berwick. The bill was to include branches to North Berwick, Tranent and Cockenzie, as well as to Dunse, and the estimated capital required was £170,000.

The NBR got the North British Railway Act 1846 (9 & 10 Vict. c. lxxiv) which authorised the branch in the 1846 session.

Construction of the line was not difficult and in 1849 it was ready for opening: free travel was permitted on a ceremonial opening day on 13 August 1849 and two long trains were fully loaded to make a return trip to the junction at Reston, although the trippers were not permitted to alight there.

The line opened for normal business on 15 August 1849; Dunse station had an over-all roof, and an engine shed and turntable. However the station was inconveniently located, at the gas works outside the town, ensuring a clear route for any later extension westward. The branch was built as a double track, although the trade previously had been small. The over-provision became apparent, and in 1856 the North British Railway Company found itself in financial difficulty and economies were sought: the line was reduced to single track on 17 January 1857.

The train service in 1850 was three trains each way weekdays, with an additional early train each way on Wednesdays (the outward train was at "6½ a.m." from Dunse). All except the early trains are shown in Bradshaw as giving connections to Edinburgh and Berwick (though there is no reference to Reston or other intermediate stations, nor to the necessity to change).

== The Berwickshire Railway ==
=== Construction ===
When the Hawick branch line of the North British Railway was taking shape, with the declared intention of continuing a trunk route to Carlisle, it became possible to consider a cross-country line linking to it from Dunse. This idea took shape as the Berwickshire Railway, planned to run from Dunse to Ravenswood Junction, a short distance north of St Boswells station (then commonly referred to as Newtown) on the Hawick line. A cross-country line already existed linking Berwick and St Boswells: it was formed by the Kelso branch of the North Eastern Railway and the Kelso branch of the North British Railway. The two branches met end to end, and earlier had been thought to have the potential to provide the strategic link across the country. However antagonism had been created between the NER and the NBR over running power agreements between Berwick and Edinburgh and from Hexham to Newcastle upon Tyne in connection with the Border Counties Railway, and co-operation at Kelso was lacking.

Berwickshire Railway Act 1862
- Act of Parliament
- Parliament of the United Kingdom
- Long title: An Act for making a Railway from the Hawick Branch of the North British Railway near Newtown Saint Boswells to Dunse.
- Citation: 25 & 26 Vict. c. cxlii

Dates
- Royal assent: 17 July 1862

Text of statute as originally enacted

The Berwickshire Railway obtained its authorising act of Parliament, the Berwickshire Railway Act 1862 (25 & 26 Vict. c. cxlii), on 17 July 1862, and the North British Railway subscribed £50,000 towards its construction capital of £100,000. Huge sums were being committed by the NBR board at this time to support friendly independent railways, to the disquiet of some NBR shareholders. When potential independent shareholders queried the potential of the line in view of the proximity of the Kelso route, the chairman of a meeting at Earlston in support of the project declared that it was "a well ascertained fact that any line of railway would pay, having ten miles on both sides of it not interfered with by any other company, and a fair population in need of coal, lime etc."

It shall be lawful for the Company to make and maintain a Railway, with all proper Works, Approaches, Stations, and Conveniences connected therewith, commencing by a Junction with the Hawick Branch of the North British Railway at a Point thereon at or near the Farm Steading of Broomhill in the Parish of Melrose and County of Roxburgh, and terminating by a Junction with the Dunse Branch of the North British Railway at or near the Dunse Station of the said Branch Railway in the Parish of Dunse and County of Berwick. — Section 22, Berwickshire Railway Act 1862 (25 & 26 Vict. c. cxlii)

In fact local proprietors had been anxious to have the railway; two of the biggest landowners pressed the company to take £5,000 worth of land for nothing, and they took shares as well.

During construction, the North British Railway insisted on land being taken for a double line, even though the Duns branch from Reston had been singled by this time. This was consistent with the strategic vision of the line forming a trunk route across the country.

Berwickshire Railway Act 1866
- Act of Parliament
- Parliament of the United Kingdom
- Long title: An Act to authorize the Berwickshire Railway Company to raise additional Capital; and for other Purposes.
- Citation: 29 & 30 Vict. c. cclxxvii

Dates
- Royal assent: 30 July 1866

Text of statute as originally enacted

The Berwickshire Railway opened from Dunse to Earlston on 16 November 1863. The onward section to Ravenswood Junction was delayed because of the complexity of building the Leaderfoot Viaduct, a massive structure of nineteen arches. Two piers immediately north of the public road gave trouble shortly after opening of the line, and strengthening work had to be carried out. In fact the NBR subscribed a further £30,000 to the Berwickshire Railway to get the line completed; this was declared to a shareholders' meeting of the NBR on 13 October 1865, and ratified retrospectively by the Berwickshire Railway Act 1866 (29 & 30 Vict. c. cclxxvii). With the viaduct built, the line was completed on 2 October 1865.

=== In operation ===
The line was worked by the North British Railway and as part of a tidying up exercise, the NBR approached the Berwickshire Railway Company in 1875 (and also other independents in the corresponding situation) with regard to amalgamation; this was agreed and an enabling act of Parliament, the North British Railway (Additional Powers) Act 1876 (39 & 40 Vict. c. cxxxiv) was passed on 13 July 1876. On 1 August 1876 the absorption became effective; Berwickshire Railway shareholders got £83 10s of North British Ordinary shares per £100 Berwickshire.

In 1895 the passenger service consisted of three trains every weekday running throughout between Reston and St Boswells, and two short workings from Duns to each end of the line respectively.

== The storm of 1948 ==
For over a week in August 1948 exceptionally heavy rainfall was experienced in Berwickshire, and this culminated in a violent rainstorm on the night of 12 August 1948. Many watercourses overtopped their banks and the ground was already saturated; this resulted in multiple washouts of railway embankments and undermining of bridge abutments and piers.

The railway between Duns and Earlston was closed immediately. The passenger service never re-opened, but a goods train service between St Boswells and Greenlaw resumed after a period; the final freight ran on 16 July 1965.

The sidings at Chirnside Paper Mill were at a low level adjacent to the Whiteadder Water; the sidings were also flooded and unusable as a result of the storm, and wagons in the sidings were retrieved by craning them up to the main line, using the Tweedmouth breakdown crane standing on the main line at the end of the viaduct.

== Closure ==
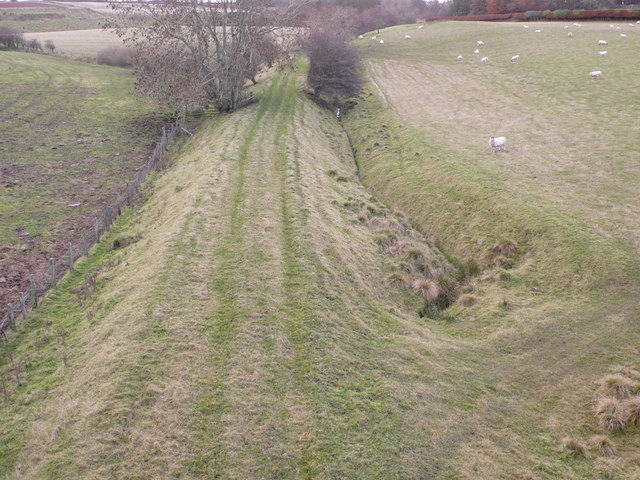
Embankment of the former line near Greenlaw

The Duns branch (as it had become since the rainstorm) was closed to passengers on 10 September 1951. It was closed to all traffic on 7 November 1966.

== Topography ==
Station list

- Reston; junction station on the main line;
- Chirnside; opened 15 August 1849; closed 10 September 1951;
- Chirnside Paper Mill Sidings;
- Edrom; opened 15 August 1849; closed 10 September 1951;
- Crumstane; opened 15 August 1849; closed by May 1852;
- Dunse; opened 15 August 1849; renamed Duns 1883; closed 10 September 1951;
- Marchmont; opened 16 November 1863; closed 13 August 1948;
- Lintmill Siding;
- Greenlaw; opened 16 November 1863; closed 13 August 1948;
- Gordon; opened 16 November 1863; closed 13 August 1948;
- Fans Loanend Siding;
- Sawmill Siding, Earlston;
- Earlston; opened 16 November 1863; closed 13 August 1948;
- Leaderfoot Viaduct;
- Ravenswood Junction;
- St. Boswells; station on main line.

Leaderfoot Viaduct is a structure of 19 arches, each of 43 feet (13 m) span; the track was carried 116 feet (35 m) above the level of the River Tweed below. Restoration work was carried out in 1991, and the structure is category A listed.

Gradients: from the main line junction at Reston the line climbed at 1-in-78 for three-quarters of a mile, then falling at 1-in-100 and 1-in-200 to Chirnside (a distance of three miles). Climbing then resumed at 1-in-100 continuously for over four miles to Duns. The line left Duns (near the 21 milepost from Ravenswood Junction) with a falling gradient at 1-in-60 before climbing again at 1-in-200 to Marchmont and then 1-in-65 to the 16 milepost. The climb continued at between 1-in-140 and 1-in-310 to Gordon, where the line reached its summit at 176 metres above sea level. A steep descent then followed at 1-in-63 for over a mile, with some respite then to Fans Loanend siding and another 1-in-65 fall for a mile and a half. From Earlston the line climbed at 1-in-70 for a mile, with a fall at 1-in-50 to Ravenswood Junction.

| Location | Distance from Duns | Description |
|---|---|---|
| Marchmont station | 3 miles 60 chains (3.75 miles, 6.04 km) | |
| Lintmill siding | 5 miles 60 chains (5.75 miles, 9.25 km) | Served RAF Charterhall |
| Greenlaw station | 8 miles 20 chains (8.25 miles, 13.28 km) | |
| Gordon station | 12 miles 24 chains (12.30 miles, 19.79 km) | |
| Fans Loanend siding | 16 miles 1 chain (16.01 miles, 25.77 km) | |
| Earlston station | 18 miles 1 chain (18.01 miles, 28.99 km) | |
| Ravenswood Junction | 21 miles 11 chains (21.14 miles, 34.02 km) | Connection to the Waverley Line between Melrose and St Boswells |
| St. Boswells station | 22 miles 38 chains (22.48 miles, 36.17 km) | |

== Sources ==
- North British Railway (1896) Working timetable for the Southern and Eastern districts
- Backtrack (periodical) August 2011; Pendragon Publishing, Easingwold; article by Alistair Nisbet on the Reston to Duns section
