= Hope (surname) =

Hope is an English, Scottish and Norwegian surname. Notable people with the surname include:

== A ==
- A. D. Hope (1907–2000), Australian poet
- Adam Hope (1813–1882), Canadian politician
- Alan Hope, a.k.a. Howling Laud Hope, British politician
- Albert Hope, New Zealand rower
- Alexander Beresford Hope (1820–1887), British author and Conservative politician
- Amanda Hope (author)
- Amanda Hope (model) (b. 1969), American model
- Anthony Hope (1863–1933), British novelist

== B ==
- Barclay Hope (b. 1958), Canadian actor
- Bjarne Johannes Hope (1944–2006), Norwegian civil servant
- Bob Hope (1903–2003), British-American comedian and actor
- Bob Hope (Emmerdale), fictional character from Emmerdale
- Brian Hope, pseudonym of composer Montague Ewing (1890–1957)
- Brian Hope-Taylor (1923–2001), British artist, archaeologist and broadcaster

== C ==
- Carly Hope (born 1991), actress and daughter of Bob Hope
- Cat Hope, Australian musician and academic
- Charles Hope, Lord Granton (1763–1851), Scottish politician and judge
- Charles Hope, 1st Earl of Hopetoun (1681–1742), Scottish nobleman
- Chris Hope (b. 1980), American football player
- Chris Hope (footballer) (b. 1972), English footballer
- Christopher Hope (b. 1944), South African writer
- Clifford R. Hope (1893–1970), Republican representative from Kansas
- Connie Bea Hope (1904–1993), American television personality

== D ==
- Daniel Hope (b. 1973), British-Irish classical violinist
- Danielle Hope (b. 1992), singer and actress
- Dave Hope (b. 1945), American bass guitar player
- David Hope, Baron Hope of Craighead (b. 1938), Scottish judge
- David Hope, Baron Hope of Thornes (b. 1940), Archbishop of York (1995–2005)
- Dolores Hope (1909–2011), singer, philanthropist and wife of Bob Hope
- Douglas Hope (1860–1918) pseudonym used by British composer Hilda Wilson

== E ==
- Elizabeth Hope (1842–1922), British evangelist
- Elmo Hope (1923–1967), American jazz pianist
- Emma Hope (born 1962), British shoe designer
- Eric Hope (1915–1999), British pianist
- Esther Studholme Hope (née Baker, 1885–1975), New Zealand painter

== F ==
- Francis Hope (1866–1941), English nobleman
- Frederick William Hope (1797–1862), English entomologist
- Fredric Hope (1900–1937), American film art director

== G ==
- Gabrielle Hope (1916–1962), New Zealand painter
- George Hope (American football), American college football coach
- George Johnstone Hope (1767–1818), British naval officer

== H ==
- Henry Hope (1735–1811), American born Dutch merchant banker
- Henry Hope (Quebec lieutenant governor)

== I ==
- Isaac Hope (1865–1956), British-born Trinidad and Tobago politician

== J ==
- Jack Hope (1898–1962), English-born American film and television producer
- James Hope (disambiguation), several people
- John Hope (merchant), Edinburgh merchant in 16th century
- Jimmy Hope (footballer) (1919–1979), Scottish footballer (Manchester City)
- Jimmy Hope (1836–1905), American burglar
- John Hope (disambiguation), several people including
  - John Hope, Lord Hope (1794–1858), Lord Justice Clerk of Scotland 1841–58
  - John Hope (educator) (1868–1936), African American educator
  - John Hope (meteorologist) (1919–2002), American meteorologist
  - John Hope, 1st Baron Glendevon (1912–1996), Scottish Tory politician
  - John Hope, 1st Marquess of Linlithgow (1860–1908), Governor-General of Australia
  - John Augustus Hope (1869–1924), British soldier and politician
- Josh Hope (b. 1998) Australian association football player
- Julian Hope, 2nd Baron Glendevon (1950–2009), British nobleman and opera producer

== K ==
- Kara Hope, American politician
- Kyle Hope (born 1988), West Indian cricketer and brother of Shai Hope

== L ==
- Leighton A. Hope (1921–1998), New York politician
- Leslie Hope (b. 1965), Canadian actress
- Leslie Townes Hope, birth name of Bob Hope

== M ==
- Mark Hope (b. 1970), English footballer
- Maurice Hope (b. 1951), former English boxer
- Mitchell Hope (b. 1994), Australian actor

== N ==
- Nellie A. Hope (1864–1918), American violinist, music teacher, orchestra conductor
- Nicholas Hope (b. 1958), English actor

== O ==
- Ole-Kristian Hope (b. ca 1965), Norwegian economist
- Olivia Hope, victim of a double murder in New Zealand

== P ==
- Peter Hope (diplomat) (1912–1999), British intelligence officer and ambassador
- Peter Hope (composer) (born 1930), British composer and arranger
- Peter Hope, 4th Baron Rankeillour (1935–2005)
- Phil Hope (born 1955), British Labour Party politician
- Philip Hope (1889–1962), English cricketer

== R ==
- Randy Hope (b. 1959), Canadian politician
- Reg Hope (1927–2010), Australian politician
- Richard Hope (disambiguation), several people
- Robert Hope-Jones (1859–1914), inventor of the theatre organ

== S ==
- Shai Hope (b. 1993) Barbados And West Indies cricket player

== T ==
- Tamara Hope (b. 1984), Canadian actress
- Tanya Hope, Indian actress
- Ted Hope (b. 1962), American film producer
- Theodore Hope (lawyer)
- Teri Hope (1938–2023), American model and actress
- Thomas Hope (disambiguation), several people

== V ==
- Vick Hope (born 1989), English television and radio presenter
- Victor Hope, 2nd Marquess of Linlithgow (1887–1952), British statesman
- Virginia Hope, New Zealand public health specialist

== W ==
- Wally Hope (1947–1975), British underground culture guru
- William Hope (disambiguation), several people, including:
  - Sir William Henry St John Hope (1854–1919), English archaeologist and antiquarian
  - William Hope (actor) (b. 1955), Canadian actor
  - William Hope (paranormal investigator) (1863–1933), pioneer 'spirit photographer'

== See also ==
- Hope (disambiguation)
- Lord Hope (disambiguation)
- Clan Hope
