= John Hope =

John Hope may refer to:

== United Kingdom ==
- John Hope (died c. 1599), MP for Flintshire (UK Parliament constituency)
- John Hope, Lord Craighall (1605?–1654), Scottish judge
- Sir John Bruce Hope (c.1684–1766), MP for Kinross, 1727–1734, 1741–1747
- John Hope, 2nd Earl of Hopetoun (1704–1781)
- John Hope (botanist) (1725–1786), Scottish surgeon and botanist
- John Hope (writer) (1739–1785), British politician and writer
- John Hope, 4th Earl of Hopetoun (1765–1823), Scottish soldier and politician
- Sir John Hope (British Army officer, born 1765) (1765–1836), British Army general
- Sir John Hope, 11th Baronet (1781–1853), MP for Midlothian, 1845–1853
- John Hope, Lord Hope (1794–1858), Scottish judge
- John Hope (lawyer) (1807-1893), Scottish lawyer and philanthropist
- John Hope (Liberal politician) (1860–1949), Scottish Liberal politician
- Sir John Hope, 16th Baronet (1869–1924), MP for Midlothian, 1912–1918, and Midlothian North and Peebles, 1918–1922
- Jack Hope (John Hope, 1905-1982), see List of Bury F.C. players (25–99 appearances)
- John Hope, 1st Baron Glendevon (1912–1996), Scottish Tory politician
- John Hope (footballer) (1949–2016), English football goalkeeper
- John Hope (merchant), French courtier and merchant who settled in Edinburgh

== United States ==
- John C. Hope (1806–1879), Lutheran scholar, priest and politician from South Carolina
- John Hope (educator) (1868–1936), American educator, first African-American president of Morehouse College and Atlanta University
- John Hope (meteorologist) (1919–2002), American meteorologist and hurricane forecaster
- John Hope (baseball) (1970–2018), American baseball pitcher

== Other ==
- Jan Hope (1737–1784), also called John Hope, Dutch banker (Hope & Co.) and owner of Groenendaal park
- John Hope (Australian politician) (1842–1926), Scottish-born Tasmanian politician
- John Hope, 7th Earl of Hopetoun (1860–1908), first Governor-General of Australia
- John Hope (cricketer, born 1841) (1841–1910), New Zealand cricketer
- John Hope (cricketer, born 1866) (1866–1950), New Zealand cricketer
- John Hope (priest) (1891–1971), Anglican priest in Sydney, Australia

== See also ==
- Jack Hope (William John Hope, 1900-1962), English–American film and television producer
