= James Hope =

James Hope may refer to:

- Sir James Hope (Royal Navy officer) (1808–1881), British admiral
- Sir James Hope of Hopetoun (1614–1661), Scottish industrialist and politician
- James Hope (Ireland) (1764–1846), Irish rebel
- James Archibald Hope (1786–1871), British Army officer
- James Hope (physician) (1801–1841), English cardiologist
- James Hope, 1st Baron Rankeillour (1870–1949), British politician
- James Hope (footballer), English footballer for Sunderland
- James Haskell Hope (1874–1952), Superintendent of Education in the state of South Carolina
- James Hope-Johnstone, 3rd Earl of Hopetoun (1741–1816), Scottish peer
- James Hope-Scott (1812–1873), English barrister
- James Hope (1807–1854), later known as James Hope-Wallace, Member of Parliament for Linlithgowshire
- Jamie Hope, fictional character in British soap opera, Emmerdale
- Jimmy Hope (1836–1905), American burglar
- Jimmy Hope (footballer) (1919–1979), Scottish football (soccer) player
- James Hope Grant, British Army officer

== See also ==
- James Hopes (born 1978), Australian cricketer
