= Linlithgowshire (UK Parliament constituency) =

Parliamentary constituency in the United Kingdom, 1801–1950

- Former county constituency for the House of Commons
- Subdivision: Linlithgowshire

1708–1950
- Seats: One
- Replaced by: West Lothian

Linlithgowshire was a Scottish county constituency of the House of Commons of Great Britain from 1708 and after 1801 the House of Commons of the Parliament of the United Kingdom to 1950. It elected one Member of Parliament (MP) by the first past the post voting system. It was replaced in 1950 by an equivalent constituency named West Lothian.

== Creation ==
The British parliamentary constituency was created in 1708 following the Acts of Union, 1707 and replaced the former Parliament of Scotland shire constituency of Linlithgowshire.

== History ==
The constituency elected one Member of Parliament (MP) by the first past the post system until 1950.

For the 1950 general election, the constituency was abolished and replaced by West Lothian.

== Members of Parliament ==
Election	Member	Party
1708	Lord Johnstone	
1708	John Houston	
1713	Sir James Carmichael	
1714	John Houston	
1715	Sir James Cunynghame	
1722	George Dundas	
1727	Alexander Hamilton	
1741	George Dundas	
1743	Charles Hope-Weir	
1768	John Hope	
1770	James Dundas	
1774	Sir William Cunynghame	
1790	John Hope	Tory
1800	Sir Alexander Hope	Tory
1834	Sir Alexander Hope	Conservative
1835	James Hope	Conservative
1838	Charles Hope	Conservative
1845	William Baillie	Conservative
1847	George Dundas	Conservative
Feb. 1859	Charles Baillie	Conservative
May 1859	Walter Ferrier Hamilton	Liberal
1865	Peter McLagan	Liberal
1893	Thomas Hope	Conservative
1895	Alexander Ure	Liberal
1913	John Pratt	Liberal
1916	John Pratt	Coalition Liberal
1918	James Kidd	Unionist
1922	Manny Shinwell	Labour
1924	James Kidd	Unionist
1928	Manny Shinwell	Labour
1931	Sir Adrian Baillie	Unionist
1935	George Mathers	Labour
1950	constituency abolished	

== Election results ==
=== Elections in the 1830s ===
General election 1830: Linlithgowshire
Party	Candidate	Votes	%
Tory	Alexander Hope	Unopposed	
Registered electors		68	
Tory hold			

General election 1831: Linlithgowshire
Party	Candidate	Votes	%
Tory	Alexander Hope	Unopposed	
Registered electors		68	
Tory hold			

General election 1832: Linlithgowshire
Party	Candidate	Votes	%
Tory	Alexander Hope	267	51.3
Whig	James Joseph Hope-Vere	253	48.7
Majority		14	2.6
Turnout		520	86.7
Registered electors		600	
Tory hold			

General election 1835: Linlithgowshire
Party	Candidate	Votes	%
Conservative	James Hope	Unopposed	
Registered electors		692	
Conservative hold			

General election 1837: Linlithgowshire
Party	Candidate	Votes	%
Conservative	James Hope	329	63.3
Whig	Robert Fulke Greville	191	36.7
Majority		138	26.6
Turnout		520	71.7
Registered electors		725	
Conservative hold			

Hope resigned, causing a by-election.

By-election, 14 June 1838: Linlithgowshire
Party	Candidate	Votes	%	±%
Conservative	Charles Hope	330	61.1	−2.2
Whig	James Johnston	210	38.9	+2.2
Majority		120	22.2	−4.4
Turnout		540	73.6	+1.9
Registered electors		734		
Conservative hold		Swing	−2.2	

=== Elections in the 1840s ===
General election 1841: Linlithgowshire
Party	Candidate	Votes	%	±%
Conservative	Charles Hope	Unopposed		
Registered electors		686		
Conservative hold				

Hope was appointed a commissioner of Greenwich Hospital, London, requiring a by-election.

By-election, 20 October 1841: Linlithgowshire
Party	Candidate	Votes	%	±%
Conservative	Charles Hope	Unopposed		
Conservative hold				

Hope resigned after being appointed Lieutenant Governor of the Isle of Man, causing a by-election.

By-election, 22 August 1845: Linlithgowshire
Party	Candidate	Votes	%	±%
Conservative	William Baillie	Unopposed		
Conservative hold				

General election 1847: Linlithgowshire
Party	Candidate	Votes	%	±%
Conservative	George Dundas	Unopposed		
Registered electors		596		
Conservative hold				

=== Elections in the 1850s ===
General election 1852: Linlithgowshire
Party	Candidate	Votes	%	±%
Conservative	George Dundas	Unopposed		
Registered electors		502		
Conservative hold				

General election 1857: Linlithgowshire
Party	Candidate	Votes	%	±%
Conservative	George Dundas	Unopposed		
Registered electors		427		
Conservative hold				

Dundas resigned upon his appointment as Lieutenant Governor of Prince Edward Island, causing a by-election.

By-election, 5 February 1859: Linlithgowshire
Party	Candidate	Votes	%	±%
Conservative	Charles Baillie	Unopposed		
Conservative hold				

General election 1859: Linlithgowshire
Party	Candidate	Votes	%	±%
Liberal	Walter Ferrier Hamilton	Unopposed		
Registered electors		425		
Liberal gain from Conservative				

=== Elections in the 1860s ===
General election 1865: Linlithgowshire
Party	Candidate	Votes	%	±%
Liberal	Peter McLagan	Unopposed		
Registered electors		813		
Liberal hold				

General election 1868: Linlithgowshire
Party	Candidate	Votes	%	±%
Liberal	Peter McLagan	600	60.9	N/A
Liberal	John Pender	385	39.1	N/A
Majority		215	21.8	N/A
Turnout		985	80.3	N/A
Registered electors		1,226		
Liberal hold				

=== Elections in the 1870s ===
General election 1874: Linlithgowshire
Party	Candidate	Votes	%	±%
Liberal	Peter McLagan	Unopposed		
Registered electors		1,198		
Liberal hold				

=== Elections in the 1880s ===
General election 1880: Linlithgowshire
Party	Candidate	Votes	%	±%
Liberal	Peter McLagan	747	74.5	N/A
Conservative	James Robertson	256	25.5	New
Majority		491	49.0	N/A
Turnout		1,003	81.4	N/A
Registered electors		1,232		
Liberal hold		Swing	N/A	

General election 1885: Linlithgowshire
Party	Candidate	Votes	%	±%
Liberal	Peter McLagan	3,801	70.3	−4.2
Conservative	Thomas Hope	1,606	29.7	+4.2
Majority		2,195	40.6	−8.4
Turnout		5,407	79.4	−2.0
Registered electors		6,808		
Liberal hold		Swing	−4.2	

General election 1886: Linlithgowshire
Party	Candidate	Votes	%	±%
Liberal	Peter McLagan	2,543	58.4	−11.9
Conservative	Thomas Hope	1,810	41.6	+11.9
Majority		733	16.8	−23.8
Turnout		4,353	63.9	−15.5
Registered electors		6,808		
Liberal hold		Swing	−11.9	

=== Elections in the 1890s ===
General election 1892: Linlithgowshire
Party	Candidate	Votes	%	±%
Liberal	Peter McLagan	2,870	51.4	−7.0
Conservative	Thomas Hope	2,709	48.6	+7.0
Majority		161	2.8	−14.0
Turnout		5,579	79.2	+15.3
Registered electors		7,042		
Liberal hold		Swing	−7.0	

1893 Linlithgowshire by-election
Party	Candidate	Votes	%	±%
Conservative	Thomas Hope	3,240	51.3	+2.7
Liberal	Alexander Ure	3,071	48.7	−2.7
Majority		169	2.6	N/A
Turnout		6,311	86.3	+7.1
Registered electors		7,315		
Conservative gain from Liberal		Swing	+2.7	

Ure

General election 1895: Linlithgowshire
Party	Candidate	Votes	%	±%
Liberal	Alexander Ure	3,760	54.4	+3.0
Conservative	Thomas Hope	3,153	45.6	−3.0
Majority		607	8.8	+6.0
Turnout		6,913	88.4	+9.2
Registered electors		7,823		
Liberal hold		Swing	+3.0	

=== Elections in the 1900s ===
General election 1900: Linlithgowshire
Party	Candidate	Votes	%	±%
Liberal	Alexander Ure	3,827	55.8	+1.4
Conservative	David Dundas	3,034	44.2	−1.4
Majority		793	11.6	+2.8
Turnout		6,861	81.2	−7.2
Registered electors		8,450		
Liberal hold		Swing	+1.4	

Ure

General election 1906: Linlithgowshire
Party	Candidate	Votes	%	±%
Liberal	Alexander Ure	5,282	65.7	+9.9
Conservative	Patrick Rose-Innes	2,761	34.3	−9.9
Majority		2,521	31.4	+19.8
Turnout		8,043	78.1	−3.1
Registered electors		10,301		
Liberal hold		Swing	+9.9	

=== Elections in the 1910s ===
General election January 1910: Linlithgowshire
Party	Candidate	Votes	%	±%
Liberal	Alexander Ure	6,451	64.6	−1.1
Liberal Unionist	William Charles Smith	3,536	35.4	+1.1
Majority		2,915	29.2	−2.2
Turnout		9,987	84.6	+6.5
Registered electors		11,810		
Liberal hold		Swing	−1.1	

General election December 1910: Linlithgowshire
Party	Candidate	Votes	%	±%
Liberal	Alexander Ure	5,835	60.8	−3.8
Conservative	James Kidd	3,765	39.2	+3.8
Majority		2,070	21.6	−7.6
Turnout		9,600	81.1	−3.5
Registered electors		11,840		
Liberal hold		Swing	−3.8	

1913 Linlithgowshire by-election
Party	Candidate	Votes	%	±%
Liberal	John Pratt	5,615	52.4	−8.4
Unionist	James Kidd	5,094	47.6	+8.4
Majority		521	4.8	−16.8
Turnout		10,709	87.8	+6.7
Registered electors		12,193		
Liberal hold		Swing	−8.4	

General Election 1914–15:

Another General Election was required to take place before the end of 1915. The political parties had been making preparations for an election to take place and by July 1914, the following candidates had been selected;

- Liberal: John Pratt
- Unionist: James Kidd
- Labour: (George Dallas ?)

General election 1918: Linlithgowshire
Party		Candidate	Votes	%	±%
C	Unionist	James Kidd	12,898	59.7	+20.5
	Labour	Manny Shinwell	8,723	40.3	New
Majority			4,175	19.4	N/A
Turnout			21,621	66.4	−14.7
Registered electors			32,562		
	Unionist gain from Liberal		Swing		
C indicates candidate endorsed by the coalition government.

=== Elections in the 1920s ===
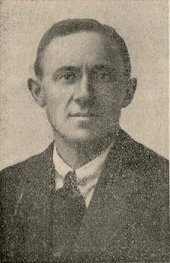
Shinwell

General election 1922: Linlithgowshire
Party	Candidate	Votes	%	±%
Labour	Manny Shinwell	12,625	46.4	+6.1
Unionist	James Kidd	8,993	33.0	−29.7
Liberal	John Fraser Orr	5,605	20.6	New
Majority		3,632	13.4	N/A
Turnout		27,223	76.5	+10.1
Registered electors		35,582		
Labour gain from Unionist		Swing	+17.9	

General election 1923: Linlithgowshire
Party	Candidate	Votes	%	±%
Labour	Manny Shinwell	13,304	50.9	+4.5
Unionist	James Kidd	8,149	31.2	−1.8
Liberal	James Johnston	4,691	17.9	−2.7
Majority		5,155	19.7	+6.3
Turnout		26,144	71.7	−4.8
Registered electors		36,459		
Labour hold		Swing	+3.2	

General election 1924: Linlithgowshire
Party	Candidate	Votes	%	±%
Unionist	James Kidd	14,765	51.1	+19.9
Labour	Manny Shinwell	14,123	48.9	−2.0
Majority		642	2.2	N/A
Turnout		28,888	80.0	+8.3
Registered electors		36,122		
Unionist gain from Labour		Swing	+11.0	

1928 Linlithgowshire by-election
Party	Candidate	Votes	%	±%
Labour	Manny Shinwell	14,446	49.1	+0.2
Unionist	Margaret Kidd	9,268	31.5	−19.6
Liberal	Douglas Young	5,690	19.4	New
Majority		5,178	17.6	N/A
Turnout		29,044	81.5	+1.5
Registered electors		36,082		
Labour gain from Unionist		Swing	+9.9	

General election 1929: Linlithgowshire
Party	Candidate	Votes	%	±%
Labour	Manny Shinwell	18,063	51.6	+2.7
Unionist	Adrian Baillie	11,241	32.1	−19.0
Liberal	John Fraser Orr	5,722	16.3	N/A
Majority		6,822	19.5	N/A
Turnout		35,026	77.9	−2.1
Registered electors		44,962		
Labour gain from Unionist		Swing	+10.9	

=== Elections in the 1930s ===
General election 1931: Linlithgowshire
Party	Candidate	Votes	%	±%
Unionist	Adrian Baillie	20,476	54.7	+22.6
Labour	Manny Shinwell	16,956	45.3	−6.3
Majority		3,520	9.4	N/A
Turnout		37,432	82.1	+4.2
Registered electors		45,612		
Unionist gain from Labour		Swing	+14.5	

General election 1935: Linlithgowshire
Party	Candidate	Votes	%	±%
Labour	George Mathers	20,905	54.1	+8.8
Unionist	Adrian Baillie	17,730	45.9	−8.8
Majority		3,175	8.2	N/A
Turnout		38,635	80.8	−1.3
Registered electors		47,813		
Labour gain from Unionist		Swing	+8.8	

=== Election in the 1940s ===
General election 1945: Linlithgowshire
Party	Candidate	Votes	%	±%
Labour	George Mathers	24,762	64.1	+10.0
Unionist	Rupert Speir	13,871	35.9	−10.0
Majority		10,891	28.2	+20.0
Turnout		38,633	73.2	−7.6
Registered electors		52,752		
Labour hold		Swing	+10.0	
