= 1913 Linlithgowshire by-election =

UK parliamentary by-election

Victorious Liberal candidate John Pratt

The 1913 Linlithgowshire by-election was a Parliamentary by-election held on 7 November 1913. The constituency returned one Member of Parliament (MP) to the House of Commons of the United Kingdom, elected by the first past the post voting system.

== Vacancy ==
Alexander Ure had been Liberal Member of Parliament for Linlithgowshire since 1895. In 1913 he was raised to the bench as Lord Strathclyde and appointed Lord Justice General.

== Previous result ==
Alexander Ure

General election December 1910: Linlithgowshire
Party	Candidate	Votes	%	±%
Liberal	Alexander Ure	5,835	60.8	−3.8
Unionist	James Kidd	3,765	39.2	+3.8
Majority		2,070	21.6	−7.6
Turnout		9,600	81.1	−3.5
Liberal hold		Swing	-3.8	

== Candidates ==
- Forty-year-old former Fabian, John Pratt was selected to defend the seat in the Liberal interest. He was Warden of Glasgow University Settlement, 1902–12 and was a Member of Glasgow Town Council, 1906. However, initially, the West Lothian Liberal Association had sought Robert Brown, the Provost of Dalkeith as their candidate. He was Secretary of the Midlothian miners and one of the few miners leaders in Scotland who were sympathetic to the Liberals. The Liberal Party had previously sought after Brown as their candidate for the 1912 Midlothian by-election where he eventually stood as a Labour Party candidate, finishing bottom of the poll. Brown once more turned down the Liberal offer and the Liberals chose Pratt.
- Edinburgh educated 41-year-old James Kidd was re-selected by the Unionists, having fought the seat at the last election.
- The Labour Party agreed not to put forward a candidate, to avoid splitting the anti-Unionist vote. However, the British Socialist Party, which criticised the Liberal/Labour electoral pact, considered putting forward Robert Small, the Secretary of the West Lothian shale miners. Local branches of the Independent Labour Party also considered running a candidate

== Campaign ==
Some 2,000 Irish electors lived in the constituency and they were expected to heavily support the Liberal candidate. Local branches of the Independent Labour Party asked local electors to vote for the Unionist Party candidate.

== Result ==
The Liberals held the seat with a reduced majority.

Linlithgowshire by-election 1913
Party	Candidate	Votes	%	±%
Liberal	John Pratt	5,615	52.4	−8.4
Unionist	James Kidd	5,094	47.6	+8.4
Majority		521	4.8	−16.8
Turnout		10,709	87.8	+6.7
Liberal hold		Swing	-8.4	

== Aftermath ==
A General Election was due to take place by the end of 1915. By the summer of 1914, the following candidates had been adopted to contest that election. Due to the outbreak of war, the election never took place.

- Scottish Liberal Party: John Pratt
- Unionist Party: James Kidd

For the 1918 general election, Pratt moved to contest Glasgow Cathcart.

General election 1918: Linlithgowshire
Party		Candidate	Votes	%	±%
C	Unionist	James Kidd	12,898	59.7	+20.5
	Labour	Manny Shinwell	8,723	40.3	New
Majority			4,175	19.2	N/A
Turnout			21,621	66.4	−14.7
	Unionist gain from Liberal		Swing		
C indicates candidate endorsed by the coalition government.
