= Charles Hope-Weir =

Scottish politician

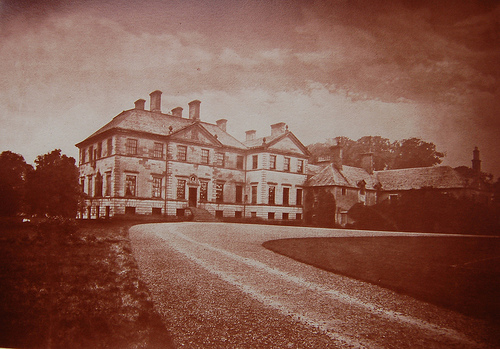
Old photo of Craigiehall

The Hon. Charles Hope-Weir (or Hope-Vere; 8 May 1710 – 30 December 1791) was a Scottish politician.

== Life ==
Born The Hon. Charles Hope, he was the second son of Charles Hope, 1st Earl of Hopetoun and Lady Henrietta Johnstone, daughter of William Johnstone, 1st Marquess of Annandale. In 1730 he inherited the Craigiehall estate, in the parish of Dalmeny, West Lothian, from his uncle, the 2nd Marquess of Annandale. He adopted the name Hope-Weir, and the arms of the Weir family, on his marriage in 1733 to Catherine Weir, daughter and heiress of the Weir Baronets of Blackwood, Lanarkshire. The family name was later changed to Hope-Vere.

On 13 May 1743 he was elected Member of Parliament (MP) for Linlithgowshire, a seat he held until 1769, when he stepped down. He was appointed Governor of Blackness Castle in 1744. He later held the posts of Commissary General of the Musters in Scotland, and Ranger of Ettrick Forest.

In 1754, with the encouragement of his uncle, the Marquess of Annandale, and his brother, the Earl of Hopetoun, Hope-Weir set off for Italy on the grand tour. His son William was already in Italy with his tutor. At his brother's suggestion, Hope-Weir took with him the young architect Robert Adam, who had been advising Lord Hope on the decoration of Hopetoun House. The pair met up in Brussels in November 1754, and travelled through France and Italy together, on the typical grand tour route, taking in Lyon, Marseille, Nice and Genoa. They met William at Pisa, and arrived in Rome in February 1755. They then fell out over travelling expenses, and over the Casa Guarnieri, a house which they both hoped to rent. Although they remained civil whenever they met, Adam wrote in a letter that Hope was a "poor, vain, affected, childish coxcomb".

After Easter, Hope-Weir went on to Naples, taking with him the minor Scottish painter and art dealer Colin Morison (1732–1810) in Adam's place. He returned home in late 1755 with his son, travelling via Frankfurt due to the political situation in France, and arriving in Britain in May 1756.

On his return he set about improving his estate at Craigiehall, building a grotto, bridge and temple, all to designs by the Adam Brothers (James Adam, John Adam, and Robert Adam). The bridge is carved with Hope-Weir's initials and the date 1757, as well as a quote from Horace, UTILI DULCI, "the useful with the sweet". The bath house is now ruined, and the temple, at the top of Lennie Hill, was truncated in the 1970s due to its proximity to Edinburgh Airport.

== Marriages and progeny ==
He married three times:

- Firstly on 26 July 1733, to Catherine Weir (d. 1743), daughter of Sir William Weir, 2nd Baronet of Blackwood, by whom he had three surviving children:
  - William Hope-Weir (1736–1811), MP and father of James Joseph Hope-Vere, MP
  - Henrietta Hope
  - John Hope (1739–1785), worked for Hope & Co., father of Charles Hope, Lord Granton, Lieutenant General Sir John Hope, and Vice-Admiral Sir William Johnstone Hope
- Secondly on 20 March 1745 he married Lady Anne Vane (1726–1776), daughter of Henry Vane, 1st Earl of Darlington. They were divorced by Act of Parliament in 1757. They had two sons:
  - Captain Charles Hope (d. 1808), RN, father of Admiral Sir Henry Hope
  - Brigadier-General Henry Hope (d. 1789), Deputy Governor General of Canada
- Thirdly in 1766 he married Helen Dunbar (d. 1794), daughter of George Dunbar, by whom he had four children:
  - Admiral Sir George Johnstone Hope (1767–1818)
  - Helen Charlotte Hope (d.pre-1812), 1st wife of John Knight (1765–1850) of Lea Castle, Wolverley, and of Simonsbath House, Exmoor, Somerset, an agricultural pioneer who commenced the reclamation of the barren moorland of the former royal forest of Exmoor.
  - Margaret Hope
  - Elizabeth Vere Hope (d. 1801), married John Hope, 4th Earl of Hopetoun

Parliament of Great Britain
Preceded by George Dundas	Member of Parliament for Linlithgowshire; 1743–1769	Succeeded by John Hope
