= Thomas Hope =

Thomas Hope may refer to:

== Politicians ==
- Sir Thomas Hope of Kerse (1606–1643), Scottish judge and politician
- Thomas Hope (American politician) (1784–1876), American politician
- Thomas Hope (MP for Linlithgowshire) (1848–1925), UK MP for the Scottish constituency of Linlithgowshire
- Thomas Hope (MP for Maidstone), British politician

== Others ==
- Sir Thomas Hope, 1st Baronet (1573–1646), Scottish lawyer
- Thomas Hope (banker, born 1704) (1704–1779), Dutch banker
- Sir Thomas Hope, 8th Baronet (1735–1771), Scottish aristocrat and agricultural reformer
- Thomas Hope (architect) (1757–1820), English-born American architect
- Thomas Charles Hope (1766–1844), Scottish physician and chemist
- Thomas Hope (designer) (1769–1831), collector, grandson of the elder
- Thomas Hope (pastor) (1846–1916), Congregationalist minister in South Australia
- Thomas Frederick Hope (1919–1996), Sierra Leonean civil engineer, businessman, and scholar
