= 1928 Linlithgowshire by-election =

UK by-election

The 1928 Linlithgowshire by-election was held on 4 April 1928. The by-election was held due to the death of the incumbent Conservative MP, James Kidd. It was won by the Labour candidate Emanuel Shinwell.

The Communist Party of Great Britain hoped to run Jack Leckie as a candidate, but eventually decided against it, due to a lack of funds.

By-election, Apr 1928: Linlithgowshire
Party	Candidate	Votes	%	±%
Labour	Manny Shinwell	14,446	49.1	+0.2
Unionist	Margaret Kidd	9,268	31.5	−19.6
Liberal	Douglas Young	5,690	19.4	New
Majority		5,178	17.6	N/A
Turnout		29,044	81.5	+1.5
Registered electors		36,082		
Labour gain from Unionist		Swing	+9.9	
