= John Hope (writer) =

British merchant, writer and politician

- Born: 7 April 1739
- Died: 21 May 1785; Newcastle upon Tyne
- Occupations: Writer and politician
- Spouse: Mary Breton

John Hope (1739–1785) was a British merchant, writer, and politician in the eighteenth century who briefly served as a Member of Parliament for Linlithgowshire before being dismissed by his cousin John Hope, 2nd Earl of Hopetoun after conflict over the John Wilkes affair. Following his dismissal from Parliament, Hope embarked on a career as a poet and essayist and raised three sons following the death of his wife in 1767. His sons were all prominent men, becoming a noted judge, general, and admiral in turn.

== Life ==
John Hope was born in 1739, the son of Hon. Charles Hope and Catherine Weir and grandson of Charles Hope, 1st Earl of Hopetoun. His father had three wives and nine children in succession, and George Johnstone Hope was a much younger half-brother. He was educated at Enfield Grammar School, Middlesex until he was 13, when he was sent to Amsterdam to learn the merchant trade from a Dutch branch of the family, Thomas Hope (1704-1779).

Hope returned to in 1759 and operated as a London merchant, although with indifferent success. In 1762 he married Mary Breton, but five years later she committed suicide, leaving him with three young boys. These sons later became Charles Hope, Lord Granton, a noted judge; John Hope, a general under Wellington in the Peninsular War and William Johnstone Hope, a politician and admiral. Hope later raised an epitaph to his wife in Westminster Abbey.

In 1768, Hope replaced his father as Member of Parliament for Linlithgowshire under the influence of his uncle John Hope, 2nd Earl of Hopetoun. Within two years, however, Hope had been replaced by James Dundas following his support of John Wilkes against his sponsor's wishes. Having been removed from Parliament, Hope returned to merchant trade, becoming a noted writer in periodicals of the time, some of which were later published in 1780 under the title of "Thoughts in Prose and Verse Started in His Walks." Hope died in 1785 of a bowel infection at Newcastle upon Tyne.

== Notes ==
Parliament of Great Britain
Preceded by Charles Hope-Weir	Member of Parliament for Linlithgowshire; 1768–1770	Succeeded by James Dundas
