= Charles Hope (lieutenant governor) =

Scottish politician (1808–1893)

The Honourable Charles Hope

7th Lieutenant Governor of the Isle of Man
- In office 1845–1860
- Monarch: Victoria
- Preceded by: John Ready
- Succeeded by: Mark Hildesley Quayle (acting)

Member of Parliament (MP) for Linlithgowshire
- In office 1838–1845
- Preceded by: James Hope
- Succeeded by: William Baillie
- Born: Charles Hope; 11 September 1808; Linlithgowshire
- Died: 31 October 1893 (aged 85)
- Education: University of Edinburgh
- Political party: Conservative
- Spouse: Lady Isabella-Helen Douglas (m. 1841)
- Children: 5
- Parents: John Hope, 4th Earl of Hopetoun (father); Louisa Wedderburn (mother)
- Relatives: John Hope, 5th Earl of Hopetoun (brother); James Hope (brother)

Charles Hope (11 September 1808 – 31 October 1893), styled The Honourable from 1823, was a Scottish Conservative Party politician.

== Early life and education ==
Hope was born on the 11 September 1808, the third son of Louisa Wedderburn and John Hope, 4th Earl of Hopetoun. His brother was John Hope, 5th Earl of Hopetoun. In 1841 he married Lady Isabella-Helen Douglas, eldest daughter of Thomas Douglas, 5th Earl of Selkirk. Educated at the University of Edinburgh, he was called to the Scottish Bar in 1831, and later to the English Bar.

== Career ==
Hope was appointed one of the Commissioners of the Greenwich Hospital in 1841. He was Member of Parliament (MP) for Linlithgowshire from 1838 until 1845.

=== Lieutenant Governorship of the Isle of Man ===
Following the death of Governor Ready, Hope was appointed Lieutenant Governor of the Isle of Man on 12 August 1845. On 26 August, together with his wife, Governor Hope arrived at Douglas on board the steamer Mona's Isle having traveled on a special sailing from Kirkcudbright. The new Lieutenant Governor was said to of received a warm reception, with various members of the public bodies and High Bailiff James Quirk in attendance. Governor Hope was sworn in at a ceremony held at Castle Rushen on 27 August, taking up residence at Lorne House, Castletown.

Governor Hope's tenure in office was not distinguished by any great public works, save that of the Laxey Wheel which was named in honour of his wife, Lady Isabella. However of particular note is Governor Hope's devotion to duty during the serious cholera outbreak which occurred during his governorship; his visit to the village of Port Erin, at that time severely ravaged by the disease, being such an instance.

The general opinion of Governor Hope's time in office was that of a firm, yet mild administrator who had brought about many minor reforms. During Governor Hope's tenure, the Isle of Man was visited by Queen Victoria and Albert, Prince Consort.

Governor Hope's retirement from office was due to private reasons, and was announced suddenly to Tynwald during its open air sitting at St John's on 5 July 1860. The statement was said to have been received with astonishment and regret, and various efforts were made to Governor Hope to reconsider his position. Governor Hope and Lady Isabella left the Isle of Man on 16 August 1860, returning to Kirkcudbright. He had held the governorship of the Isle of Man for within 10 days of 15 years.

Upon his retirement Governor Hope was initially succeeded by Mark Hildesley Quayle and subsequently by Francis Pigott Stainsby Conant.

== Later life ==
Hope retired initially to Bridge Castle and then to St Mary's Isle near Kirkcudbright.

Prior to 1893 Hope had for some time been in declining health, and the loss of his wife in July of that year came as a further shock. He died on the morning of Tuesday 31 October 1893. He was survived by three sons and two daughters.

Hope's grandson, Charles Dunbar Hope-Dunbar, proved his claim to the Dunbar Baronetcy of Baldoon (created in 1664) in 1916 and became the 6th Baronet (see Hope-Dunbar Baronets).

== Sources ==
- Oliver & Boyd's New Edinburgh Almanack and National Repository, 1845

Parliament of the United Kingdom
| Preceded by James Hope | Member of Parliament for Linlithgowshire; 1838–1845 | Succeeded by William Baillie |
Government offices
| Preceded by John Ready | Lieutenant Governor of the Isle of Man; 1845–1860 | Succeeded by Mark Hildesley Quayle (acting) |
