= George Dundas (colonial administrator) =

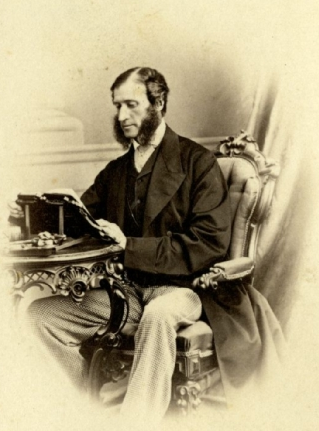
George Dundas

George Dundas CMG (12 November 1819 – 18 March 1880) was a Scottish Tory politician and colonial administrator.

Born in England, he was the eldest son of James Dundas, and resided in Dundas Castle. Dundas purchased a second lieutenantcy in the Rifle Brigade in 1839, serving in various places such as Bermuda and Nova Scotia. He was promoted first lieutenant without purchase in 1842.

In politics, he represented Linlithgowshire in the House of Commons from 1847 until his resignation in 1859.

On 8 June 1859, Dundas was appointed Governor of Prince Edward Island, a position he kept until 22 October 1868. In 1875, Dundas was appointed Lieutenant Governor of Saint Vincent in the Caribbean. In 1879, he was created a Companion of the Order of St Michael and St George.

Governor Dundas died at Saint Vincent in 1880.

== Sources ==
- Oliver & Boyd's new Edinburgh almanac and national repository for the year 1850. Oliver & Boyd, Edinburgh, 1850

Parliament of the United Kingdom
Preceded by William Baillie	Member of Parliament for Linlithgowshire; 1847 – 1859	Succeeded by Charles Baillie
Government offices
Preceded by William Hepburn Rennie	Lieutenant Governor of Saint Vincent; 1875–1880	Succeeded by Augustus Frederick Gore
