= Walter Ferrier Hamilton =

British Liberal politician (1818–1872)

Member of Parliament for Linlithgowshire
- In office 2 April 1859 – 14 July 1865
- Preceded by: Charles Baillie
- Succeeded by: Peter McLagan

Personal details
- Born: 31 May 1818
- Died: 8 April 1872 (aged 52)
- Party: Liberal
- Relatives: Thomas Ferrier Hamilton (brother)

Walter Ferrier Hamilton (31 May 1818 – 8 April 1872, Torphichen) was a British Liberal politician.

Ferrier Hamilton was elected Liberal MP for Linlithgowshire at the 1859 general election until 1865 when he did not seek re-election at that year's election.

Hamilton's father was Col. John Ferrier Hamilton, of the 3rd (Prince of Wales's) Dragoon Guards, and his mother was The Hon. Georgina Prendergast Vereker, the third daughter of Charles Vereker, 2nd Viscount Gort. Hamilton was their first son and inherited his father's properties. Hamilton's younger brother was Thomas Ferrier Hamilton who became an Australian politician, pastoralist, and sportsman.

Parliament of the United Kingdom
Preceded by Charles Baillie	Member of Parliament for Linlithgowshire; 1859–1865	Succeeded by Peter McLagan
