= Featherstone Castle =

Country mansion in Northumberland, England

- Northumberland, England
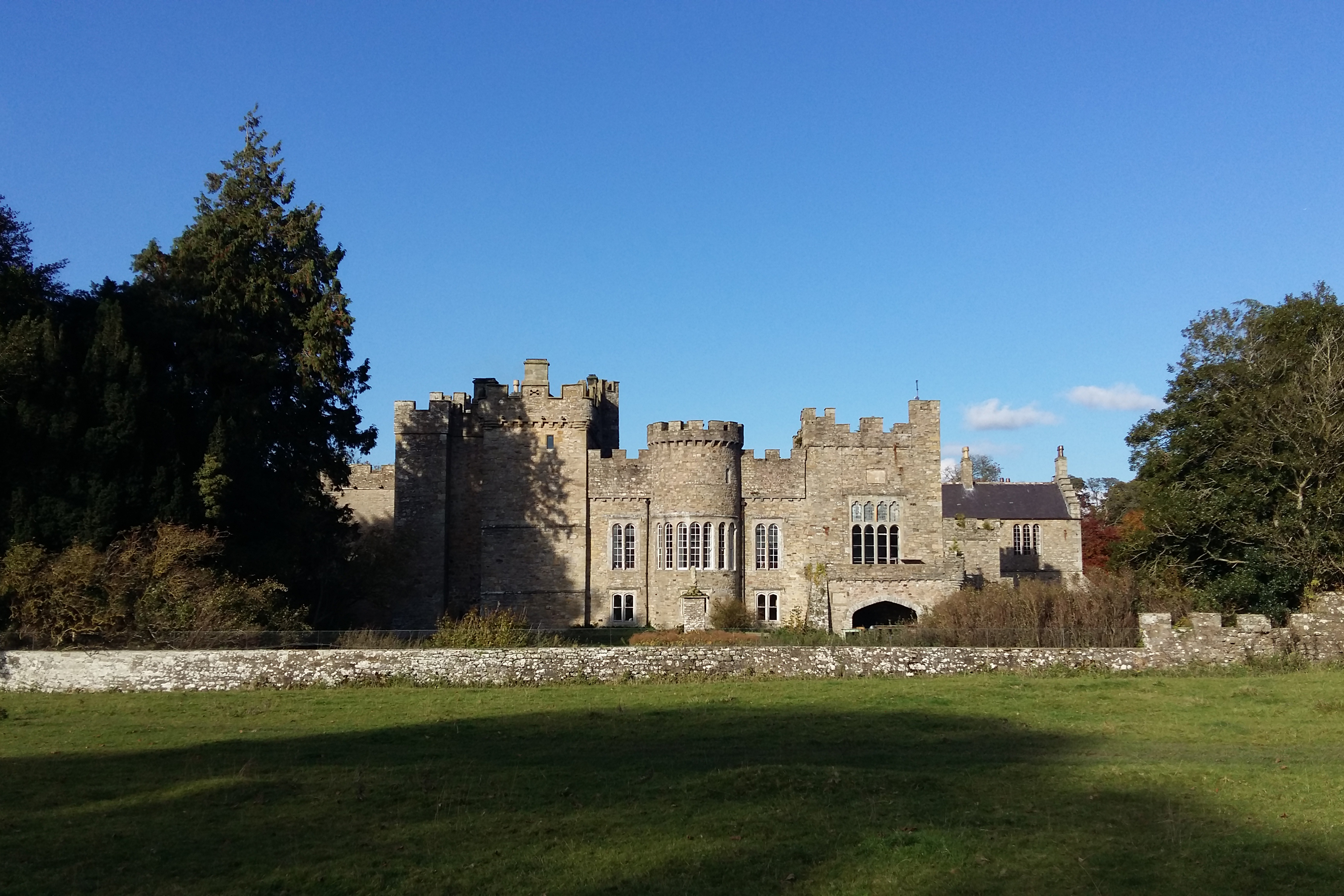
- Featherstone Castle, 2016

Location
- Location in Northumberland
- Coordinates: 54.943°N 2.510°W
- Grid reference: NY674610

Featherstone Castle, a Grade I listed building, is a large Gothic style country mansion situated on the bank of the River South Tyne about 3 miles (5 km) southwest of the town of Haltwhistle in Northumberland, England.

== Medieval origins ==
In the 11th century the manor house on this site belonged to the Featherstonehaugh family. It has played an important role in the battles between the English and the Scots. The building was possibly a 13th-century hall house, and a square three-storey pele tower was added in 1330 by Thomas de Featherstonehaugh. A survey from the year 1541 reported the property to be a tower in good repair, occupied by Thomas Featherstonehaugh.

The earliest recorded history of this area derives from the Roman occupation period; in 122 AD, the Romans erected Hadrian's Wall, the course of which lies about 5 kilometres to the north of Featherstone Castle.

== Post medieval ==
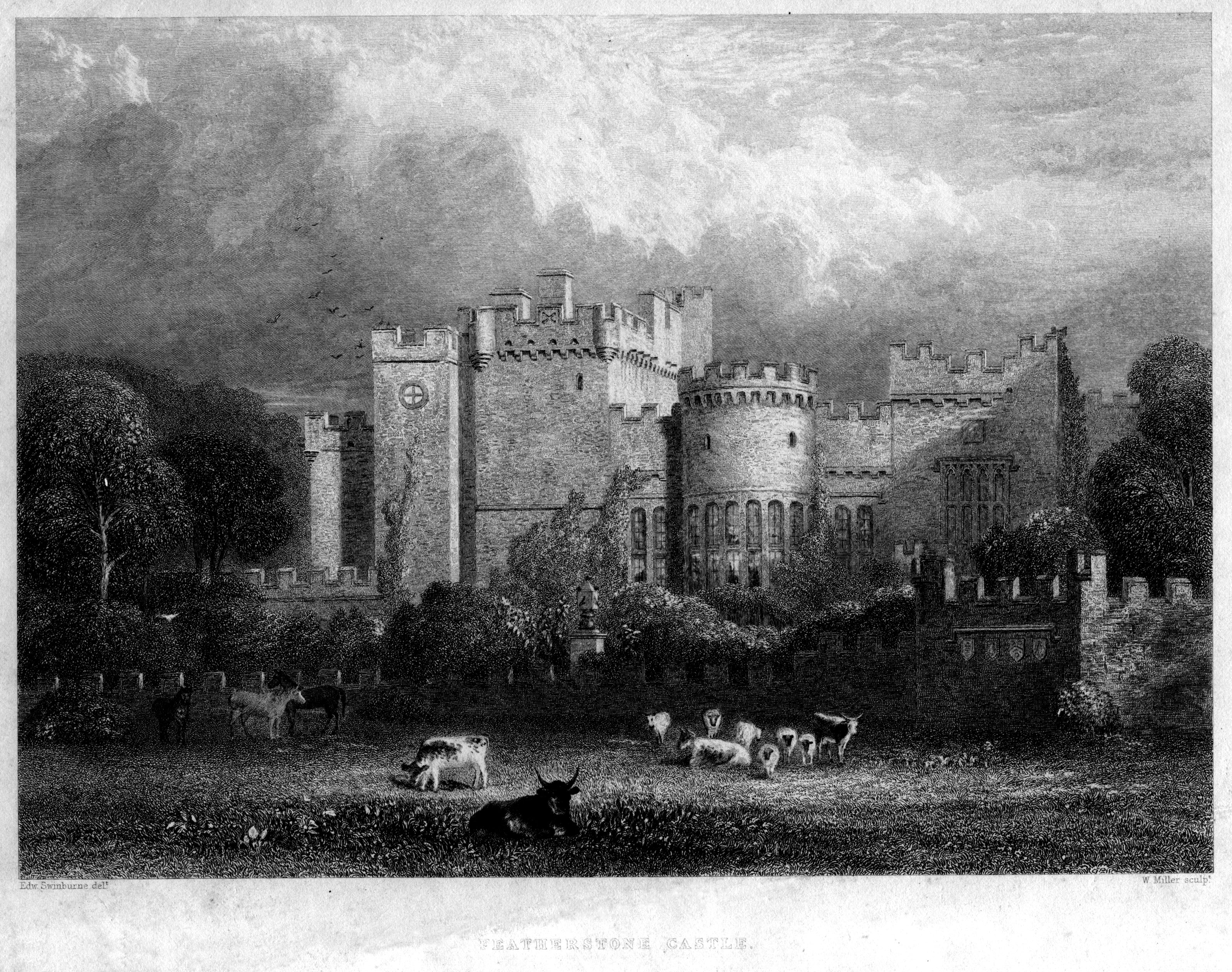
Featherstone Castle by William Miller

In the 17th century the property was acquired by Sir William Howard (father of the 1st Earl of Carlisle) and was remodelled and substantially enlarged.

The house was repurchased from the Earl of Carlisle in 1711 by Matthew Featherstonehaugh (1662–1762). A survey of 1715 disclosed 'an ancient and well-built structure'. The family remained in occupation until Sir Matthew Fetherstonhaugh sold the property to James Wallace about 1789. His son Thomas Wallace carried out further alterations between 1812 and 1830. Lord Wallace bequeathed the estate to his nephew Colonel James Hope (1807–1854), (son of the Earl of Hopetoun), who changed his name to Hope-Wallace.

The various alterations to the structure have resulted in a large castellated and complex country house, rectangular in form with a central courtyard and towers at each angle.

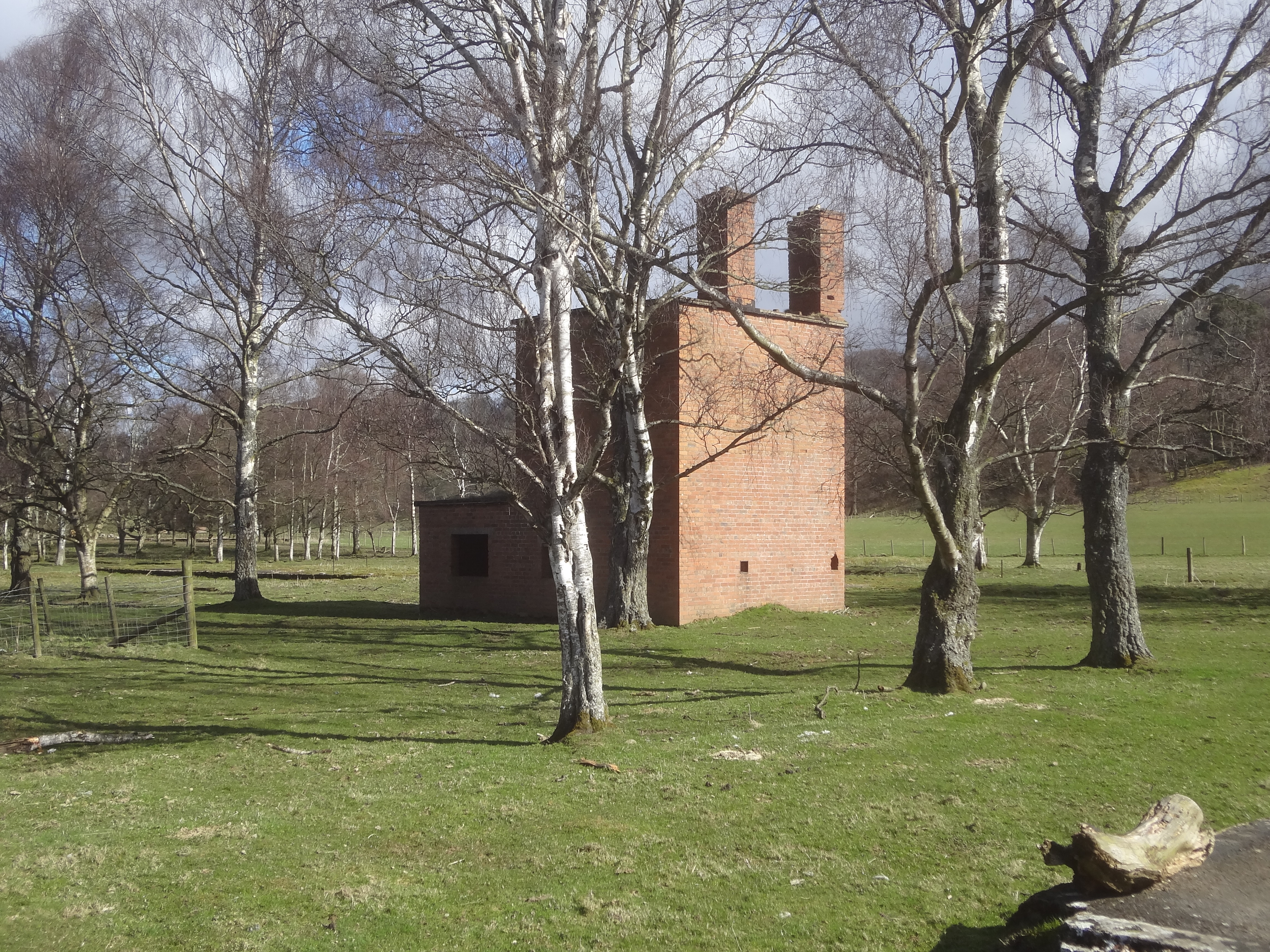
Brick remains of the Camp 18 POW camp in Featherstone Park, March 2015.

In 1825, farmers working on the lands at Wydon Eals near Featherstone Castle discovered what was thought at first to be a buried oak tree trunk. However, when they proceeded to cut it with an axe, it was revealed to be an oaken coffin containing human remains. These bones steadily turned into dust when they were exposed to the atmosphere. The remains of four other wooden coffins were discovered in the same area. These log-coffins have been stated to belong to the early medieval period, and similar examples have been found in the north and east of England.

During World War II, bordering the South Tyne river and stretching across a mile of Featherstone Park, there was Camp 18, a POW camp that housed 7000 German Officers after 1945. Some of the remains of the camp are still visible on the grounds of Featherstone Castle. The camp closed its doors on 15 May 1948. The remaining German officers were sent by bus to Haltwhistle, from where they took the train to other clearing camps in Britain, and then they went to Germany. In 1950 the contents of the camp were sold. A memorial plaque was erected at the former entrance to the camp in 1982.

== Modern usage ==
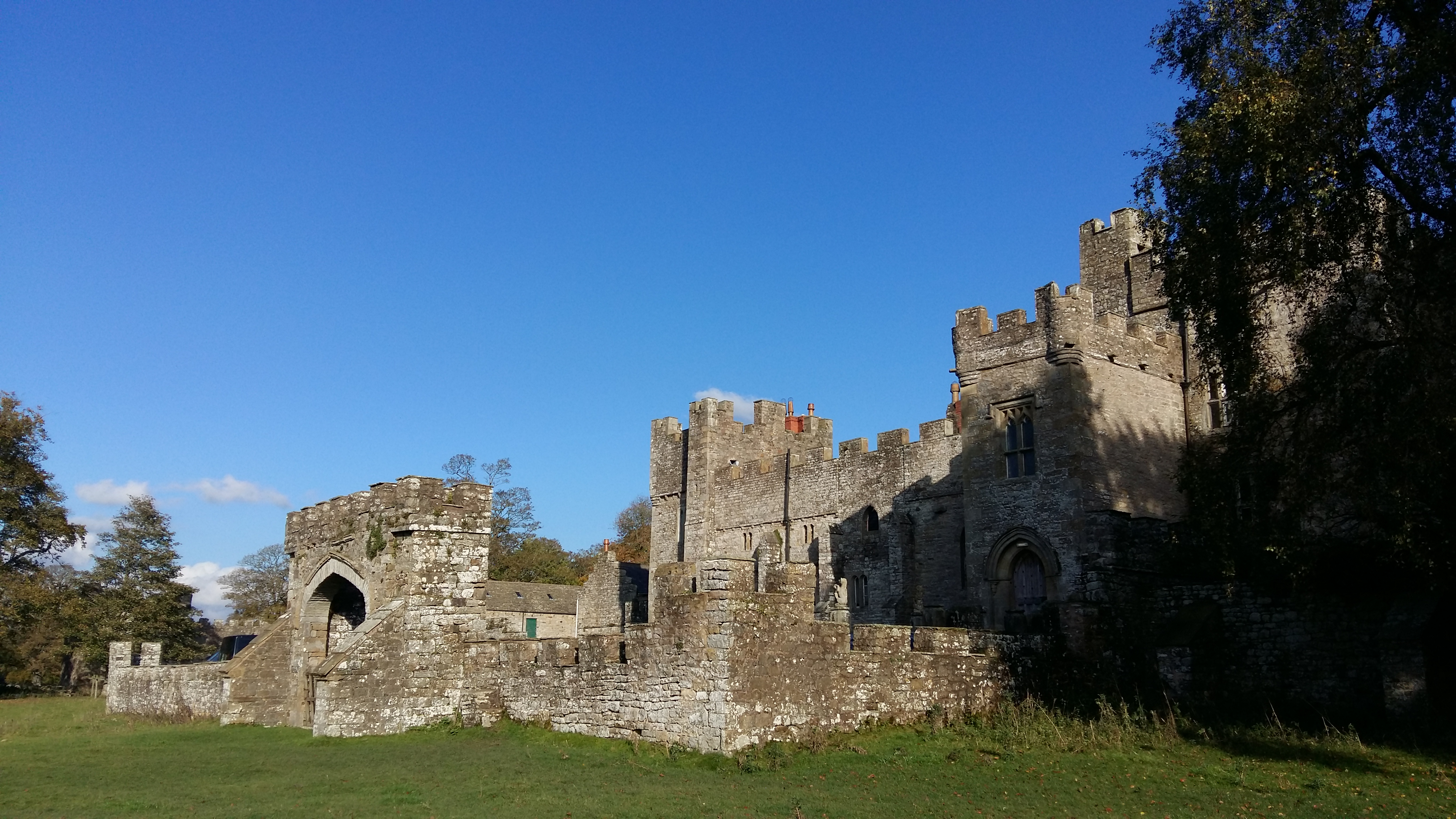
Featherstone Castle in October 2016.

The property was sold in 1950 and became a boys' preparatory school, known as Hillbrow School, named after the house where it had originally been established near Rugby School in the Midlands. Hillbrow by then was settled at Overslade House, which had been damaged by a landmine in 1940. In 1961 the school moved to new premises at Ridley Hall, Northumberland, and Featherstone Castle was converted to a residential conference and activity centre for young people and students.
