= Alexander Ure, 1st Baron Strathclyde =

Scottish politician

The Right Honourable The Lord Strathclyde GBE PC
- Alexander Ure c. 1895

Solicitor General for Scotland
- In office 1905–1909
- Monarch: Edward VII
- Preceded by: James Avon Clyde
- Succeeded by: Arthur Dewar
- Born: 22 February 1853
- Died: 2 October 1928 (aged 75)
- Resting place: Helensburgh Cemetery
- Education: University of Glasgow
- Political party: Liberal
- Spouse: Margaret McDowell Steven (m. 1879)
- Children: 1
- Parents: John Ure (father); Isabella Ure (mother)

Alexander Ure, 1st Baron Strathclyde, GBE, PC (22 February 1853 – 2 October 1928) was a Scottish politician, judge, and georgist land value tax activist.

== Life ==
He was the son of John Ure, lord provost of Glasgow, and his wife Isabella.

He studied law at the University of Glasgow, and was admitted to membership of the Faculty of Advocates in 1878.

He was a Liberal Member of Parliament for Linlithgowshire from 1895 to 1913. He became a queen's counsel in 1897.

He provided as solicitor general for Scotland from December 1905 to 1909, and as Lord Advocate from February 1909 to 1913. He was an enthusiastic supporter of David Lloyd George's 1909–10 budget. He was sworn of the Privy Council in 1909. In 1909, he conducted the prosecution of Oscar Slater for murder; the conviction was later quashed on appeal.

He lived at 31 Heriot Row, a large Georgian townhouse, in Edinburgh's Second New Town.

On leaving Parliament, he was raised to the bench as Lord Strathclyde and appointed Lord Justice General, a post he held until 1920. He was raised to the Peerage as Baron Strathclyde, of Sandyford in the County of Lanark, in 1914. In 1917, he was appointed to the Order of the British Empire as a Knight Grand Cross. He is said to have been skilled in cross-examination, and was more suited to life as an advocate than as a judge.

He retired to his father's house of Cairndhu in Helensburgh in 1920 and died there in 1928. He is buried in Helensburgh Cemetery.

== Notable trials ==
Ure prosecuted alleged murderer Oscar Slater, now seen as a serious mistrial. Slater was sentenced to death in 1909. The sentence was commuted to life imprisonment. Following a campaign by Arthur Conan Doyle and others, Slater received a pardon, but only after having served 18 years in Peterhead Prison.

== Family ==
In 1879, he married Margaret McDowell Steven; their only child was a daughter, Christobel Helen Ure, who died in 1918, before her father.

The peerage, therefore, became extinct on his death.

Parliament of the United Kingdom
Preceded by Thomas Hope	Member of Parliament for Linlithgowshire; 1895–1913	Succeeded by John Pratt
Legal offices
Preceded by James Avon Clyde	Solicitor General for Scotland; 1905–1909	Succeeded by Arthur Dewar
Preceded by Thomas Shaw	Lord Advocate; 1909–1913	Succeeded by Robert Munro
Preceded by The Lord Dunedin	Lord Justice General; 1913–1920	Succeeded by James Avon Clyde
Peerage of the United Kingdom
New creation	Baron Strathclyde; 1914–1928	Extinct
