= Sir William Baillie, 2nd Baronet =

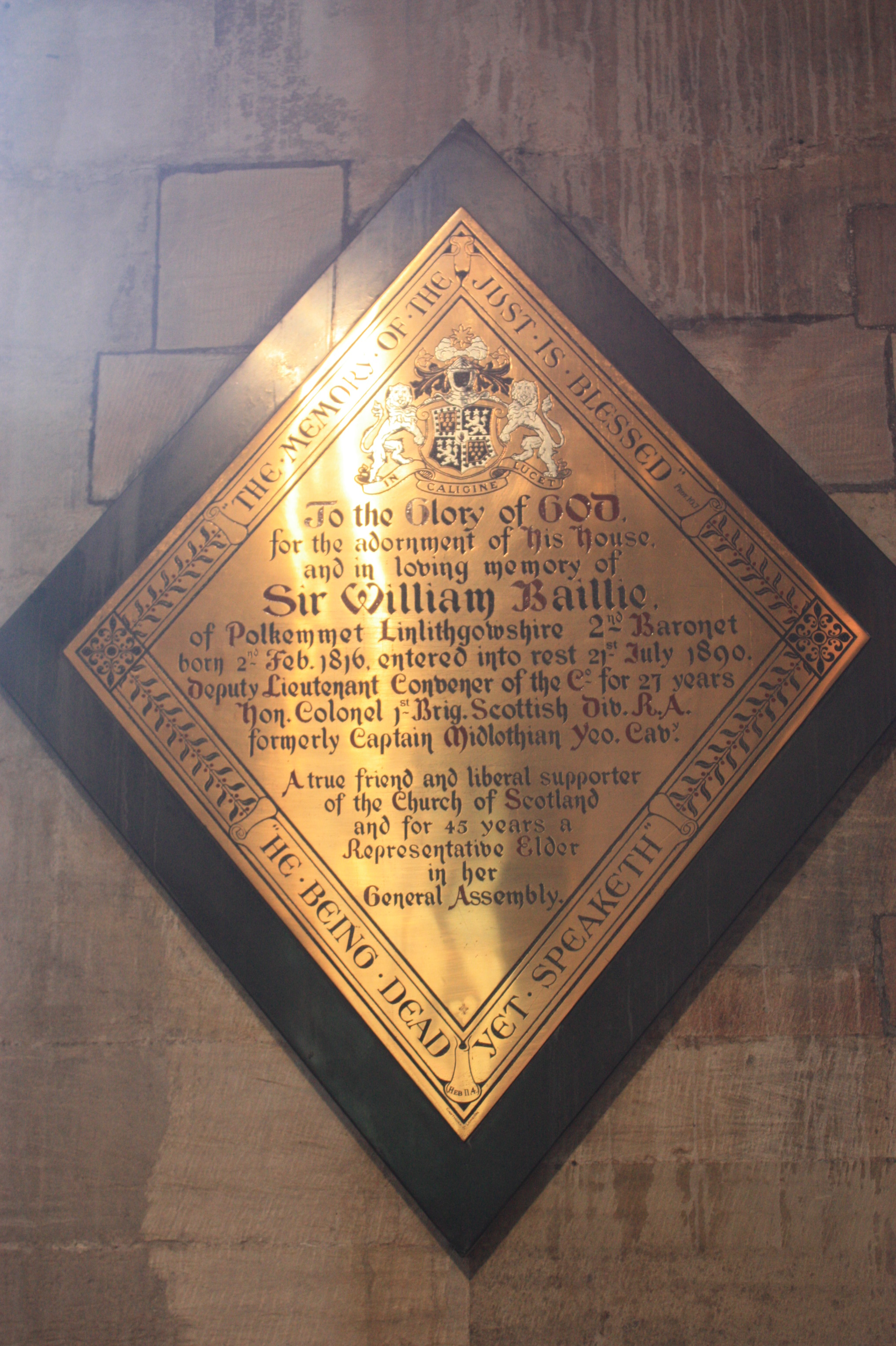
Plaque to William Baillie, Lord Polkemmet, St Michael's Church, Linlithgow

Sir William Baillie of Polkemmet, 2nd Baronet, DL (2 February 1816 – 21 July 1890) was a Scottish oarsman and Conservative politician who sat in the British House of Commons between 1845 and 1847.

== Life ==
Born in Edinburgh, he was the eldest son of Sir William Baillie, 1st Baronet and his wife Mary Lyon Dennistoun, the youngest daughter of James Dennistoun. Baillie was educated at Eton College and then at Christ Church, Oxford, where he graduated with a Bachelor of Arts degree in 1836.

While at Oxford, he rowed in the Oxford eight in the second Boat Race which was held in 1836, when Cambridge won. He was also a part of the Head of the River crew at Oxford with his college boat, Christ Church.

Baillie served as captain in the Midlothian Yeomanry Cavalry, and was Lieutenant-Colonel commanding the Edinburgh City Artillery from 1866 to 1884. In 1845 he was elected Member of Parliament for Linlithgowshire, sitting for the next two years. Baillie was a Deputy Lieutenant of Linlithgowshire from 1850 and was a Justice of the Peace.

In 1878 he was the honorary commander of the City Artillery Volunteer Corps based at 27 Cockburn Street, Edinburgh.

== Family ==
On 14 April 1846, Baillie married Mary Stewart, the eldest daughter of Stair Hathorn Stewart. In 1854, he succeeded his father as baronet, and when Baillie died childless in 1890, he was succeeded in the baronetcy by his nephew George.

== See also ==
- List of Oxford University Boat Race crews

Parliament of the United Kingdom
Preceded by Charles Hope	Member of Parliament for Linlithgowshire; 1845 – 1847	Succeeded by George Dundas
Baronetage of the United Kingdom
Preceded by William Baillie	Baronet (of Polkemmet); 1854 – 1890	Succeeded by George Baillie
