= Peter McLagan =

British Liberal politician

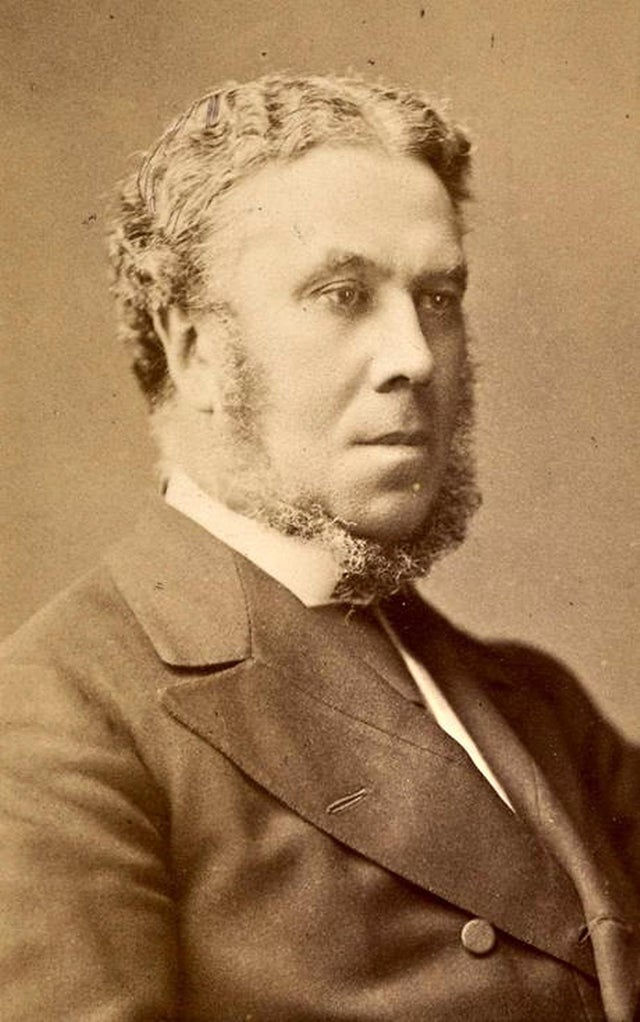
Peter McLagan

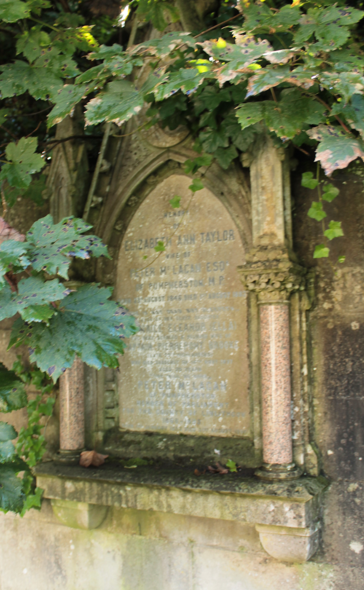
The grave of Peter McLagan MP, Kirk of Calder, Mid Calder

Peter McLagan (1823 – 31 August 1900) was a British Liberal Party politician who sat in the House of Commons from 1865-93. He was Scotland's first non-White and first Black MP.

== Life ==
McLagan was born in Demerara in British Guiana. His father was Peter McLagan (1774–1860), and his mother was an unknown black woman. His father co-owned a sugar plantation with Samuel Sandbach. As part of the abolition of slavery in the British empire in the 1830s, McLagan's father and Sandbach received more than £21,000 (£2,791,310 in 2020) in compensation for 400 slaves.

He left British Guiana with his father as a child and was educated in Tillicoultry and Peebles, before attending the University of Edinburgh.

In 1841, at the age of 18, he is known to be living at 77 Great King Street in the New Town, Edinburgh, with his father and cousin. His father died in 1860 and is buried in New Calton cemetery.

At the 1865 general election, he was elected unopposed as the Member of Parliament for Linlithgowshire, and was re-elected at the next six general elections. He resigned his seat on 2 June 1893 by becoming Steward of the Manor of Northstead.

As an MP, he supported women's suffrage, the need for women doctors, and the Irish Home Rule Movement, although he abstained on the First Home Rule Bill.

In 1878, he and his wife supported the erection of the McLagan memorial water fountain in Bathgate.

McLagan owned the Pumpherston estate in West Lothian.

He died at Marylebone in London but is buried with his wife in the churchyard of Kirk of Calder in Mid Calder, West Lothian.

== Family ==
He was married to Elizabeth Ann Taylor (1846–1882).

Parliament of the United Kingdom
Preceded by Walter Ferrier Hamilton	Member of Parliament for Linlithgowshire; 1865 – 1893	Succeeded by Thomas Hope
