= William Hope =

William Hope may refer to:

- William Johnstone Hope (1766–1831), prominent and controversial British Royal Navy officer and politician
- Sir William Hope, 14th Baronet (1819–1898), British Army officer
- William Hope (VC) (1834–1909), Scottish recipient of the Victoria Cross
- William Hope (paranormal investigator) (1863–1933), pioneer of so-called "spirit photography"
- William Hope (artist) (1863–1931), Canadian painter, draftsman and war artist
- William Henry Bateman Hope (1865–1919), British Member of Parliament for North Somerset, 1906–1910
- William Hope Hodgson (1877–1918), English author of horror, fantastic fiction and science fiction
- William John Hope (1900–1962), English–American film and television producer, also known as Jack Hope
- William Hope (actor) (born 1955), Canadian actor
