= Douglas Young (judge) =

British judge and politician

Sir John Douglas Young (7 April 1883 – 13 April 1973), was a British judge and Liberal Party politician.

== Background ==
Young was born in Helensburgh, Argyllshire. He was educated at Merchiston Castle School, Edinburgh and Pembroke College, Cambridge, where he received a BA. In 1912 he married Joyce Macewen Smith of Glasgow. They had two sons. He was knighted in 1935.

== Political career ==
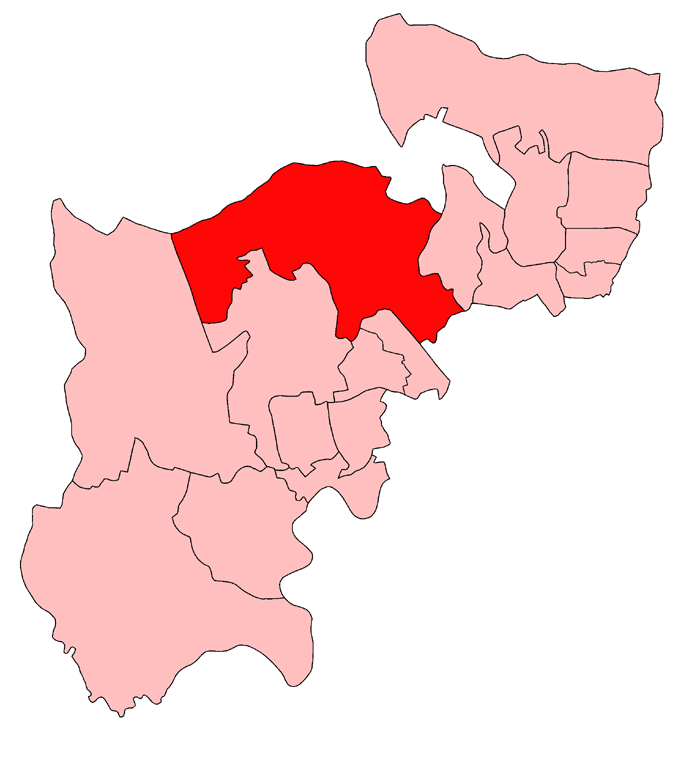
Hendon in Middlesex, 1922

He was Liberal candidate for the Hendon division of Middlesex at the 1922 General Election. He was Liberal candidate for the Southend division of Essex at the 1923 and 1924 General Elections. Southend was a safe Unionist seat which Young nearly gained in 1923;

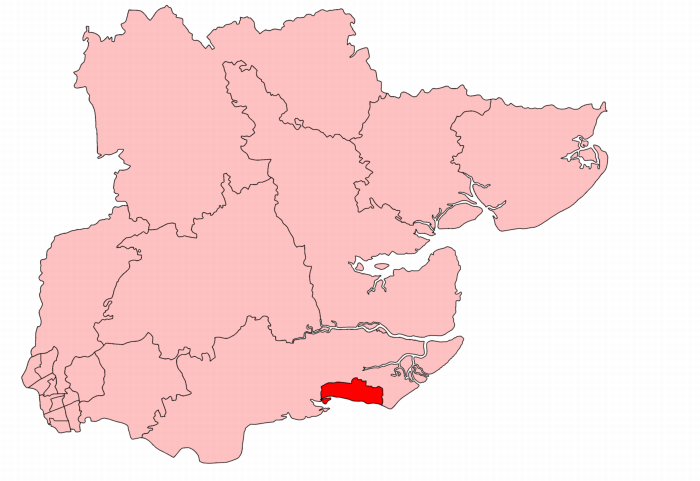
Southend in Essex, 1922-23

In 1924, a difficult election for the Liberal party, Southend returned to being a safe Unionist seat;

He did not contest the Southend by-election in 1927 and instead was Liberal candidate for the 1928 Linlithgowshire by-election. This was a Labour/Unionist marginal that no Liberal had fought in 1924. The party had finished a distant third in 1923, so the seat was not promising. He came third as expected but did poll the highest Liberal vote since 1910;

He did not stand for parliament again.

== Legal career ==
Young was a judge of the Allahabad High Court between 1929–34 and Chief Justice of the High Court of Judicature, Lahore between 1934–43. At Lahore, he founded the College of Physical Education and Scouting.

During and after the Second World War, Young was Controller of Military Government Courts (President, Military Government General Court) of the Allied Commission for Austria (British Element), between December 1944 and January 1948.

== Election results ==
General Election 1923: Southend
Party	Candidate	Votes	%	±%
Unionist	Rupert Guinness, Viscount Elveden	15,566	50.2	−11.7
Liberal	John Douglas Young	15,453	49.8	+11.7
Majority		113	0.4	−23.4
Turnout			69.3	+1.3
Unionist hold		Swing	-11.7	

General Election 1924: Southend
Party	Candidate	Votes	%	±%
Unionist	Rupert Guinness, Viscount Elveden	23,417	62.5	
Liberal	John Douglas Young	10,924	29.1	
Labour	Sydney Alexander Moseley	3,144	8.4	n/a
Majority		12,493	33.4	
Turnout			79.3	
Unionist hold		Swing		

By-election, Apr 1928: Linlithgowshire
Party	Candidate	Votes	%	±%
Labour	Emanuel Shinwell	14,446		
Unionist	Margaret Henderson Kidd	9,268		
Liberal	John Douglas Young	5,690		
Majority				
Turnout				
