= Alias Jesse James =

1959 film by Norman Z. McLeod

- theatrical release poster
- Directed by: Norman Z. McLeod
- Screenplay by: William Bowers; Daniel B. Beauchamps
- Story by: Robert St. Aubrey; Bert Lawrence
- Produced by: Jack Hope
- Starring: Bob Hope; Rhonda Fleming
- Cinematography: Lionel Lindon
- Edited by: Jack Bachom; Marvin Coil
- Music by: Joseph J. Lilley (uncredited)
- Production company: Hope Enterprises
- Distributed by: United Artists
- Release date: March 20, 1959 (US)
- Running time: 92 minutes
- Country: United States
- Language: English
- Box office: $1.9 million (est. US/ Canada rentals)

Alias Jesse James is a 1959 American Western comedy film directed by Norman Z. McLeod and starring Bob Hope and Rhonda Fleming. Based on a story by Robert St. Aubrey and Bert Lawrence, the film is about an outlaw who tries to kill an insurance agent who has been mistaken for him in order to collect on a big policy. Costumes by Edith Head.

== Plot ==
Milford Farnsworth is a bumbling insurance agent who unknowingly sells a life insurance policy to the outlaw Jesse James. Farnsworth is sent out west to shield the insurance company's investment by "protecting" James.

James has his own plan: to have Farnsworth killed while the insurance man is dressed as the outlaw so that James and his soon-to-be "widow", Cora Lee Collins, can collect on the $100,000 insurance policy. Farnsworth avoids several attempts on his life while he and Collins fall in love.

After the last attempt is made on his life, Farnsworth impersonates the Justice of the Peace, who is supposed to marry James and Collins. Farnsworth and Collins make a run for it in buckboard wagon, with her driving and he having fallen through and having to run as fast as he can stuck in that position. They end up in a gun battle with the James Gang; several Western heroes from television and the movies make their cameos to surreptitiously help Farnsworth.

In the end, Farnsworth is celebrated as a hero, marries Collins, and becomes president of the insurance company. He boasts to a potential client that he offers protection for every contingency. His secretary announces Mrs. Farnsworth. It is Collins, followed by their six red-headed children, the youngest a pair of twins. "Well, you can't get insurance against everything," he says to the audience. His wife whispers in his ear and, as "The end" appears on screen, Farnsworth shrugs and rolls his eyes at the audience.

== Cast ==
- Bob Hope as Milford Farnsworth
- Rhonda Fleming as Cora Lee Collins
- Wendell Corey as Jesse James
- Scatman Crothers as a train porter
- Gloria Talbott as Princess Irawanie
- Jim Davis as Frank James
- Will Wright as Titus Queasley
- Mary Young as 'Ma' James
- Jack Lambert as Snake Brice
- Mickey Finn as Tough #2 in Dirty Dog Saloon
- Bob Gunderson as James Gang member
- Fred Kohler, Jr. as James Gang member
- Ethan Laidlaw as James Gang member
- Glenn Strange as James Gang member
- Trigger (horse) as Trigger

== Production ==
William Bowers wrote the script with Bud Beauchamp based on a story that Bob Hope owned. They wrote it in four weeks.

== Cameo appearances ==
The gunfight scene at the end of the film features a number of cameo appearances by movie and television personalities who help Farnsworth and Collins defeat the James Gang. Although none are identified by character name in the film, each actor is dressed in the costume they wear playing the iconic Western character he or she portrayed on television or film. Most repeat the cliché of blowing non-existent smoke from their gun barrels, and they speak dialogue evoking their characters.

- Hugh O'Brian as Wyatt Earp: "That got 'em!"
- Ward Bond as Major Seth Adams from WagonTrain: "Well, back to the wagon."
- James Arness as Marshal Matt Dillon in the television series Gunsmoke: "Well, another one for boot hill."
- Roy Rogers (as himself), known for his radio and television programs, and many films, including an earlier Hope western, Son of Paleface.
- Fess Parker as Davy Crockett, as he portrayed him in the Disney film and television miniseries, says, "Shoot at my friend, will ya", as he moves to reload his flintlock (which does smoke).
- Gail Davis as Annie Oakley: "A little high…"
- Gary Cooper as himself: "Yep". Cooper also wears a dark blue shirt, a black hat and a badge. He is not dressed as Will Kane from High Noon.
- Jay Silverheels as Tonto, the Lone Ranger's partner on the television show, shoots one of the villains with an arrow. "Paleface bite dust."
- Bing Crosby, dressed in TV-style Western regalia and wearing a badge, ends the gunfight by shooting Jesse James' gun out of his hand. Crosby coughs when blowing into his gun, shakes his head, then shrugs and says to the audience, "This fellow needs all the help he can get," a reference to similar comments breaking the fourth wall in the Hope and Crosby "Road to…" pictures.

Following the theatrical release of the film, some later versions did not include all the cameos due to myriad legal problems with the rights, but Hope's clout at the time was so great that he managed to gather a dazzling array of screen cowboys for the original. The 2007 MGM Movie Legends DVD release of the film includes all of the cameos. The print streamed on TCM.com in August 2023 including all of the actors listed above.

== See also ==
- List of American films of 1959
