= Thomas Frederick Hope =

Sierra Leonean civil engineer, businessman, and scholar

Thomas Frederick Hope OBE CEng
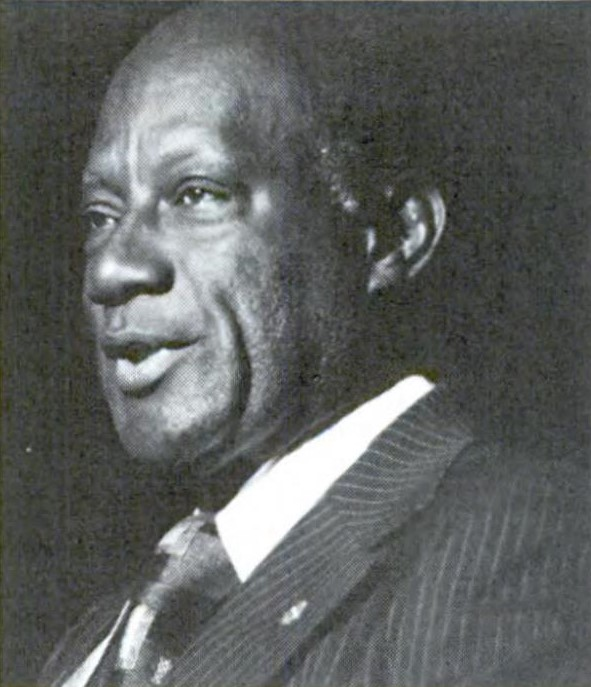
- Born: 22 March 1919; Freetown, Sierra Leone
- Died: 19 May 1996 (aged 76); London, England
- Other names: Tommy Hope, Tom Hope
- Education: Achimota School; Loughborough Technical College; Fourah Bay College (honorary Doctorate)
- Occupations: Civil Engineer; businessman
- Years active: 1942–1996
- Spouse: Christine Ellenora Akaje-Macauley (m. 1953)
- Children: 4, incl. Andre Thomas Hope; Ann-Lise Hope; Anthea Abayomi-Cole, née Hope; Anthony Hope
- Parents: Thomas George Frederick Hope (father); Lottie Fanny, née Elba (mother)
- Awards: OBE

Thomas Frederick Hope OBE CEng (22 March 1919 – 19 May 1996) was a Sierra Leonean civil engineer, businessman, and scholar who was the general manager and chief engineer of the Guma Valley Water Company and president of the Sierra Leone Chamber of Commerce. He was onetime president of the Ecobank Transnational Incorporated and was onetime president of the Federation of West African Chambers of Commerce.

== Early life and education ==
Thomas Frederick Hope was born on 22 March 1919 in Freetown, Sierra Leone to Creole parents, Thomas George Frederick Hope, a mechanic, and Lottie Fanny, née Elba, of Jamaican Maroon, Liberated African, and distant English descent and possibly with partial origins in Wellington Village. Thomas Frederick Hope was educated at the Government Model School in Freetown and subsequently at the Prince of Wales School.

Hope was initially attached to the General Clerical Service of the Colonial Secretary's Office and was subsequently awarded a three-year scholarship to Achimota College for the purpose of undertaking an engineering qualification to take up the role of assistant water works engineer to the Freetown City Council. He then attended the Achimota College in Ghana and proceeded to Loughborough Technical College in England, before returning to Sierra Leone and entering the Sierra Leonean civil service from 1940 to 1942.

== Career and business activities ==
=== Engineering career ===
He was appointed as an Assistant Water Engineer in 1950 and he served as Assistant Water Engineer in 1951 and was later promoted to the role of City Water Engineer in 1955. He served as Acting general manager of the Guma Valley Water Company in 1961 and was promoted to general manager of the Guma Valley Water Company in 1962 and later general manager and Engineer-in-Chief in 1963. He served as general manager and Chief Engineer of the Guma Valley Water Company from 1963 until his retirement in May 1976.

=== Business and civil activities ===
Following his retirement in May 1976, Hope was appointed as the Chief Consultant of the Engineering and Management Consultancy Ltd (ENGCON) in Freetown, Sierra Leone and was a consultant to the African Development Bank in Abidjan, Ivory Coast.

Hope served as President of the Sierra Leone Chamber of Commerce from 1952 to 1978 and was at one-time a member of the Sierra Leone Employers Federation. He had an active interest in the development of sports in Sierra Leone and served as chairman of the Sierra Leone Amateur Athletic Association and was a member of the Sierra Leone Sports Council from 1951 to 1970 which he eventually led as president. He served as President of the Sierra Leone Olympic and Overseas Games Committee from 1963. He was also an active member and President of the Sierra Leone Rotary Club and was an Administrative Adviser to Group F. of Rotary International.

Hope also served as chairman and director on the boards of several well-known multi-national companies operating in Sierra Leone and West Africa more broadly.

== Achievements ==
Hope held the DSc (Honoris Causa) of the University of Sierra Leone. He was awarded an M.B.E. in the 1961 Queen's Birthday Honours and an O.B.E. in the 1970 New Year Honours.

== Personal life ==
Thomas Hope married Christine Ellenora Akaje-Macauley, a daughter of William Akaje-Macauley, a Sierra Leonean lawyer on 12 August 1953 in Freetown, Sierra Leone. Thomas Hope and Christine Hope had four children including Andre Thomas Hope, a lawyer and businessman who serves as a non-executive director of Ecobank Sierra Leone, Ann-Lise Hope, Anthea Abayomi-Cole, née Hope, and Anthony Hope.

Thomas Hope died in a London Hospital in London, England at the age of 77 in 1996.

== Sources ==
- Sierra Leone Year Book
- Who's Who
- West Africa
