= John Pratt (Liberal politician) =

Scottish politician

John Pratt

John Pratt chaired in 1913

Sir John William Pratt (9 September 1873 – 27 October 1952), was a Scottish Liberal Party politician.

Pratt was Warden of Glasgow University Settlement, 1902–12 and was a Member of Glasgow Town Council, 1906. At the start of his political career he was a Fabian.

Pratt entered Parliament for Linlithgowshire in a 1913 by-election, a seat he held until 1918, and then represented Glasgow Cathcart until 1922. He served in the coalition government of David Lloyd George as a Junior Lord of the Treasury from 1916 to 1919 and as Parliamentary Secretary to the Ministry of Health for Scotland from 1919 to 1922. He was knighted in the 1922 Dissolution Honours.

Pratt did not contest the general election of the same year. At the 1923 General election he sought a return to parliament but narrowly failed to re-gain Dundee for the Liberals. He then contested the 1924 Glasgow Kelvingrove by-election without success. He did not contest the 1924 General Election. At the 1929 General Election, he stood for the Liberals at Sunderland without success. At the 1931 General Election, he stood for the New Party at Manchester Hulme, again without success.

Pratt died in October 1952, aged 79.

== Electoral record ==
1913 Linlithgowshire by-election
Party	Candidate	Votes	%	±%
Liberal	John William Pratt	5,615	52.4	−8.4
Unionist	James Kidd	5,094	47.6	+8.4
Majority		521	4.8	−16.8
Turnout		10,709		
Liberal hold		Swing	-8.4	

General election 1918: Glasgow Cathcart
Party	Candidate	Votes	%	±%
Liberal	John William Pratt	16,310	78.4	N/A
Labour	Gavin Brown Clark	4,489	21.6	N/A
Majority		11,821	56.8	N/A
Turnout		20,799		N/A
Liberal win (new seat)				

General election 1923: Dundee (2 seats)
Party	Candidate	Votes	%	±%
Scottish Prohibition	Edwin Scrymgeour	25,753	25.1	−2.5
Labour	Edmund Dene Morel	23,345	22.7	−2.9
Liberal	Sir John William Pratt	23,031	22.4	+16.7
Unionist	Frederick William Wallace	20,253	19.7	n/a
Communist	William Gallacher	10,380	10.1	+5.1
Majority		2,722	2.7	
Majority		314	0.3	
Turnout			72.5	−8.0
Scottish Prohibition hold		Swing		
Labour hold		Swing		

1924 Glasgow Kelvingrove by-election
Party	Candidate	Votes	%	±%
Unionist	Walter Elliot Elliot	15,488	55.3	
Labour	Aitken Ferguson	11,167	39.8	
Liberal	Sir John William Pratt	1,372	4.9	
Majority		4,321	15.5	
Turnout			70.5	
Unionist hold		Swing		

General election 1929: Sunderland
Party	Candidate	Votes	%	±%
Labour	Marion Phillips	31,794	19.5	+0.2
Labour	Alfred Smith	31,085	19.0	−0.3
Unionist	Sir Walter Raine	29,180	17.9	−7.4
Unionist	Luke Thompson	28,937	17.7	−7.7
Liberal	Elizabeth Trebelle Morgan	21,300	13.0	−4.8
Liberal	Sir John William Pratt	21,142	12.9	+0.7
Majority		1,905	1.1	7.1
Turnout			81.1	−3.5
Labour gain from Unionist		Swing		

General election 1931: Manchester, Hulme
Party	Candidate	Votes	%	±%
Conservative	Sir Joseph Nall	25,185	70.0	
Labour	Andrew McElwee	9,219	25.6	
New Party	Sir John William Pratt	1,565	4.6	
Majority		15,966	44.4	
Turnout		35,969	73.02	
Conservative gain from Labour		Swing		

Parliament of the United Kingdom
Preceded by Alexander Ure	Member of Parliament for Linlithgowshire; 1913–1918	Succeeded by James Kidd
New constituency	Member of Parliament for Glasgow Cathcart; 1918–1922	Succeeded by John Primrose Hay
Political offices
Preceded by Geoffrey Howard; George Henry Roberts; William Bridgeman; Walter Rea	Junior Lord of the Treasury; James Hope 1916–1919; Stanley Baldwin 1917; James Parker 1917–1919; Josiah Towyn Jones 1917–1919; Robert Sanders 1919; 1916–1919	Succeeded by James Parker; Josiah Towyn Jones; Robert Sanders; Sir Godfrey Collins
New office	Parliamentary Secretary to the Ministry of Health for Scotland; 1919–1922	Succeeded by James Kidd
