= Richard Hope =

Richard Hope may refer to:

- Richard Hope (actor), British actor
- Richard Hope (footballer) (born 1978), English footballer
- Dick Hope, Scottish footballer
