= Mark Hope =

English footballer

Personal information
- Full name: Mark Bryan Hope
- Date of birth: 13 June 1970
- Place of birth: Isleworth, England
- Position: Centre back

Senior career*
Years	Team	Apps	(Gls)
- Porthleven
1997	Darlington	1	(0)
- * Club domestic league appearances and goals

Mark Bryan Hope (born 13 June 1970) is an English former footballer who played in the Football League as a centre back for Darlington.

Hope joined Third Division Darlington from non-league club Porthleven in January 1997, and made his debut on 11 January away to top-of-the-table Fulham. Playing as the middle of three centre-backs, he was substituted after 65 minutes with Darlington having conceded twice in three minutes to go 3–0 down, and never played league football again.
