= James Hope (footballer) =

English footballer

Personal information
- Full name: James William Hope
- Place of birth: Kelloe, England
- Position: Inside forward

Senior career*
Years	Team	Apps	(Gls)
1902–1903	Kelloe		
1903–1904	Southmoors Violet		
1904–1905	Birtley		
1905–1906	West Stanley		
1906–1907	Horden Colliery Welfare		
1907–1908	Horden Athletic		
1908–1909	Sunderland	1	(0)
- * Club domestic league appearances and goals

James William Hope was an English professional footballer who played as an inside forward for Sunderland.
