= Thomas Hope (MP for Linlithgowshire) =

Capt Thomas Hope (3 February 1848 – 28 March 1925) was the Tory MP for Linlithgowshire, winning it in the 1893 by-election and resigning it in 1895. In Freemasonry, he was also Provincial Grand Master of the Provincial Grand Lodge of Linlithgowshire from 1894 to 1904. Thomas Hope was elected to the newly created Linlithgowshire County Council (for Torphichen Parish) in 1889 and became its first County Convener.

Parliament of the United Kingdom
Preceded by Peter McLagan	Member of Parliament for Linlithgowshire; 1893 – 1895	Succeeded by Alexander Ure
