= James Kidd (politician) =

British politician

James Kidd (11 March 1872 – 2 March 1928) was a British solicitor and Unionist Party politician in Scotland. He sat in the House of Commons from 1918 to 1922, and from 1924 until his death in 1928.

== Biography ==
Educated at Carriden Public School and Edinburgh University, Kidd was a solicitor by profession who practiced at Linlithgow. He was elected at the 1918 general election as Member of Parliament MP for Linlithgowshire, standing as a Coalition Unionist, that is a supporter of David Lloyd George's Coalition Government. He was defeated at the 1922 general election by the Labour Party candidate Manny Shinwell.

Kidd stood again in 1923 general election, without success. He defeated Shinwell in the 1924 general election and held the seat until his death in 1928, aged 55.

He served briefly as an Under-Secretary of State for Scotland with responsibility for health.

He was a justice of the peace and procurator-fiscal for his county.

His daughter Dame Margaret Kidd (1900–1989) was a lawyer and sheriff principal from 1960 to 1974, and the first woman to become a member of the Faculty of Advocates.

Parliament of the United Kingdom
Preceded by John Pratt	Member of Parliament for Linlithgowshire; 1918 – 1922	Succeeded by Manny Shinwell
Preceded by Manny Shinwell	Member of Parliament for Linlithgowshire; 1924 – 1928	Succeeded by Manny Shinwell
