= Water supply in Sierra Leone =

Water supply and sanitation in Sierra Leone

Data
- Water coverage (broad definition): 58% (2015)
- Sanitation coverage (broad definition): 15% (2015)
- Continuity of supply: not available
- Average urban water use (L/person/day): 40
- Average urban water and sanitation tariff (US$/m^{3}): 0.22
- Share of household metering: 20%
- Annual investment in WSS: US$12m in 2000 (US$2 per capita and year)
- Share of self-financing by utilities: None
- Share of tax-financing: 15–20% in 2000
- Share of external financing: 80–85% in 2000

Institutions
- Decentralization to municipalities: In progress (decided in 2004)
- National water and sanitation company: Sierra Leone Water Company (Salwaco)
- Water and sanitation regulator: None
- Responsibility for policy setting: Ministry of Energy and Water
- Sector law: Guma Valley Water Company in Freetown, Salwaco and local councils

Water supply in Sierra Leone is characterized by limited access to safe drinking water. Despite efforts by the government and numerous non-governmental organizations, access has not much improved since the end of the Sierra Leone Civil War in 2002, stagnating at about 50% and even declining in rural areas. In the capital Freetown, taps often run dry. It is hoped that a new dam in Orugu, for which China committed financing in 2009, will alleviate water scarcity.

With a new decentralization policy, embodied in the Local Government Act of 2004, responsibility for water supply in areas outside the capital was passed from the central government to local councils. In Freetown the Guma Valley Water Company remains in charge of water supply.

A 2005 report says that wide-scale corruption is a major problem in the sector. It continues to say that there is a lack of trust between non-governmental organizations (NGOs) and the public water company Salwaco, which was "suspicious to NGOs". A decision by Salwaco to use only German Kardia hand pumps was controversial, since they are more than twice as expensive as the India Mark II pumps preferred by many NGOs.

== Access ==
According to the numbers released by JMP in 2017, 58% of the population has access to at least basic water and 15% of the population has access to at least basic sanitation. However, estimating the number of people with access to safe drinking water in a developing country is a challenging task. Since drinking water quality is typically not tested regularly for a representative sample of households through the entire country, there are no reliable data on the share of drinking water that is safe. National household surveys typically ask questions about the type of water source used. House connections, yard connections, standpipes and handpumps that are located within 1 km are classified as what is called an improved water source. Open wells, unprotected springs, rivers, lakes and ponds are not considered improved water sources.

In Sierra Leone, according to a national survey (Multiple Indicator Cluster Survey) carried out in 2006, 84% of the urban population and 32% of the rural population had access to an improved water source. Those with access in rural areas were served almost exclusively by protected wells. The 68% of the rural population without access to an improved water source relied on surface water (50%), unprotected wells (9%) and unprotected springs (9%).

20% of the urban population and 1% of the rural population had access to piped drinking water in their home. Since national household surveys are not carried out on an annual basis, more recent survey data than those of 2006 were not available as of March 2010. Compared to the 2000 survey access has increased in urban areas, but has declined in rural areas, possibly because facilities have broken down because of a lack of maintenance.

Access to an improved water source does not give an indication about whether water supply is continuous. For example, in Freetown taps were running dry for most of the year in 2009. People collected water in containers wherever they can and those who can afford it install water tanks on their houses. Even the fire brigade used its trucks to sell drinking water. There were fights between firefighters and employees of the Guma Water Company, responsible for water supply in Freetown, sometimes resulting in deaths.

== Water resources ==
Sierra Leone is endowed with abundant water resources, including seven major rivers: the Kolenté (Great Scarcies), Kaba, Rokel, Pampana (Jong), Sewa, Moa, and Mano. There are substantial groundwater resources. However, water is scarce during the dry season: only 11-17 percent of the annual river discharge occurs between December and April, with minimum discharge in April.

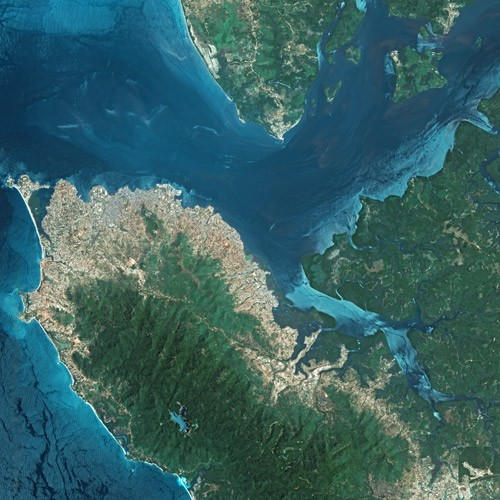
The capital Freetown seen by satellite.

Freetown example. The main source of piped water for Greater Freetown, an urban agglomeration of about two million, is the Guma dam located in the Western Area Forest Reserve. It supplies 83 million liters a day entering the city from the West where the more affluent areas are located. A new dam, the Orugu dam, would provide an additional 75 million liters per day in its initial phase, entering the city from the East where the poorest areas are located. According to a study by the consulting firm Atkins and Oxfam the dam “is the answer to the water supply crisis in Freetown”. In 2009 the Chinese government announced it would provide a US$28.8 million concessional loan to build the dam.

== History ==
Prewar history. By the early 1980s there were only 64 piped water systems serving about 30,000 people out of a population of about 3.5 million. In rural areas, where 78% of the population lived, access to water supply increased from only 10% to 45% during the 1980s, mostly through the installation of handpumps.

A joint study by the WHO and the World Bank recommended the introduction of cost recovery and the establishment of a national water company. As a result, a law was passed in 1988 that introduced the principle of cost recovery and established the Sierra Leone Water Company (Salwaco). Water tariffs were introduced in urban areas as flat rates, i.e. rates that were independent of consumption and without metering for residential customers. Only for commercial customers and public institutions meters were installed and bills began, in principle, to be based on consumption.

The Civil War (1991-2002). The Sierra Leone Civil War - which erupted in 1991, escalated in 1996-98 and finally ended in 2002 - was a tremendous setback for the country. More than 50,000 people were killed, many more were mutilated and 2.5 million people became refugees inside or outside the country.

The social fabric of the country was severely damaged with child soldiers having committed atrocities and families disrupted. Water supply infrastructure fell into disrepair or was damaged, institutions broke down and access to an improved water source declined to 15%. The progress made during the 1980s was completely lost and the country was in worse shape than two decades before.

The dam, water treatment plant and transmission pipelines serving Freetown had been rehabilitated and their capacities were expanded between 1996 and 2002 in the midst of the Civil War with support from the World Bank. This allowed to provide clean water to a burgeoning population inflated by a huge influx of refugees. Furthermore, water supply systems in four towns (Bo, Kenema, Makeni and Lungi) were rehabilitated between 2000 and 2003.

Postwar history. The return of peace and of external donors allowed not only an expansion of investments in water supply, but spurred also a renewed debate about sector reforms. For example, the establishment of an autonomous public utilities regulatory body that would approve requests for tariff increases has been discussed. Private sector participation in urban water supply in Freetown has also been proposed. However, at least as of 2007, none of these reforms has been implemented. In 2003 the Guma Valley Water Company, which provides water to Freetown, incurred an operating loss of US$1.5m, equivalent to almost 40 per cent of sales revenue. The company collected only 28 per cent of its total billings. A major tariff increase in 2004 has not been sufficient to address Guma's serious financial difficulties.

== Responsibility for water supply ==
=== Policy and regulation ===
The Ministry of Water Resources, through its water supply division, is in charge of setting policies for water supply within the government. Since 2007 the Minister is Ogunlade Davidson. In September 2008 the government adopted a National Water and Sanitation Policy.

=== Service provision ===
The 14 districts and 2 areas of Sierra Leone.

The Guma Valley Water Company (GVWC) is responsible for water supply in Greater Freetown. The assignment of the responsibility for water supply outside Freetown is ambiguous. According to the 1988 law that created the Sierra Leone Water Company (Salwaco), the company is responsible for water supply in the entire country except the capital.

The Local Government Act of 2004 devolved the responsibility for water supply to local councils. Local councils consist of 12 District Councils for each district of Sierra Leone and 6 town Councils in Freetown, Bo, Bonthe, Kenema, Koidu (Kono District) and Makeni (Bombali District). Where the towns are part of districts, it seems that the district councils are only in charge of the rural areas outside the towns.

As of 2010, Salwaco provides piped water in the towns of Lungi (Port Loko District), Makeni (Bombali District), Bo and Kenema) and was in the process of providing water in Mile 91, Pujehun and Kabala (Koinadugu District). Although Salwaco is supposed to transfer service provision in these towns to local councils, this has not happened so far. Salwaco is also supposed to assist local councils in other parts of the country in planning, building, operating and maintaining water systems, but has little capacity to do so. Local councils also have limited capacities, including for water supply. Water supply and sanitation departments were supposed to be set up in 2007 in local councils, but it is unclear to what extent this has happened.

In some small towns that have no town councils water supply and sanitation boards consisting of volunteers have been set up, such as in Rokupr, a town with 14,000 residents where a water supply system has been rehabilitated between 2006 and 2009. According to JICA, “a fair, affordable and self-sufficient tariff system” has been set up in the town.

== Financial aspects ==
Investments. According to estimates by the United Nations Development Program, the investment cost of reaching the Millennium Development Goal of halving the proportion of people without access to an improved water source will cost about US$200 million between 2006 and 2015 in Sierra Leone. Actual investments in water supply were US$12m in 2000, out of which US$10m came from external donors.

Tariffs and cost recovery. When Sierra Leone came to independence in 1961, the Government initiated a free water policy. This has now become a mindset that is hard to break. As of 2005, Salwaco’s tariffs were extremely low at 1,500 Leones(US$0.56) per month per connection, corresponding to US$0.03 per cubic meter for a monthly water use of 20 cubic meter. The African Development Bank estimated that only about 10 per cent of people receiving water were paying for it. In Freetown, close to 80 per cent of customers are billed flat rates that are not based on consumption. Often, these bills are not paid or paid reluctantly after the utility cuts off water supply. Water tariffs are among the lowest in Sub-Saharan Africa.

The average water tariff in Freetown is equivalent to US$0.22 per cubic meter, compared to more than US$1 in Senegal. At 40 percent non-revenue water, consisting of physical distribution losses and water theft - are twice as high as those in a well-run utility, such as the one in Senegal. Despite these challenges the Guma Valley Water Corporation managed to cover 85 percent of its operational costs and about 50 percent of total costs in 2009.

For more recent and detailed information see: World Bank:Sierra Leone Public Expenditure Review for Water and Sanitation 2002 To 2009, retrieved on 7 November 2012

== External cooperation ==
The EU, UNICEF, GIZ from Germany, the World Bank, Danida from Denmark, and JICA from Japan supported water supply in Sierra Leone. In 2011 the African Development Bank and the OPEC Fund for International Development approved $62 million for water supply systems in Bo, Kenema and Makeni.

The Islamic Development Bank provided a loan of US$4.8 million for water supply in Kailahum, Kenema, Kono and Tonkolili Districts. Among the non-governmental organizations CARE, Inter Aide, Action Aid, WaterAid, World Vision, OXFAM, Plan International and others are active in water supply in the country.
