= John Hope (cricketer, born 1866) =

New Zealand cricketer (1866–1950)

Personal information
- Born: 28 May 1866; Dunedin, Otago, New Zealand
- Died: 27 May 1950 (aged 83); Dunedin, Otago, New Zealand
- Bowling: Left-arm medium
- Role: Bowler

Domestic team information
- Years: Team
- 1885/86–1899/2000: Otago

Career statistics
Competition	First-class
Matches	22
Runs scored	243
Batting average	10.56
100s/50s	0/0
Top score	24
Balls bowled	3,304
Wickets	73
Bowling average	13.12
5 wickets in innings	7
10 wickets in match	1
Best bowling	6/23
Catches/stumpings	16/–
- Source: Cricinfo, 16 July 2023

John Hope (28 May 1866 – 27 May 1950) was a New Zealand sportsman. He played 22 first-class cricket matches for Otago between the 1885–86 and 1899–1900 seasons and played representative rugby union for the Otago and Southland Rugby Football Unions. He was later a prominent sports administrator in the province.

== Sporting career ==
Hope was born at Dunedin in 1866 and educated at the Old Stone School in the city. He played club cricket for Carisbrook and made his representative debut against Canterbury in a Boxing Day 1885 fixture at Carisbrook, going on to play in a total of 22 first-class matches for the side, playing in every season from 1892–93 until the end of his career in December 1899. Primarily a bowler, he took 73 wickets in first-class cricket, including seven five-wicket hauls and recorded ten-wickets in a match once. His best innings bowling figures of 6/23 were taken against the touring Fiji side at Carisbrook in February 1895.

A long-term member of the Union Football Club in Dunedin, Hope played rugby union as a three-quarter for Otago and Southland. He played against the touring New South Wales side in 1886 and in 1888, whilst playing in Invercargill, played representatively for Southland against Otago―considered "so well known in Dunedin" by the Otago Witness that there was no need for the paper to comment on him. The Southland Times, however, described him as having a "splendid drop kick" and being a "good dodgy runner". Later in the same season he played for Otago against the touring British side which played throughout New Zealand and Australia.

== Later life ==
After retiring from playing cricket and rugby, Hope remained active in the sporting world. He played lawn bowls and was a life member of and president of Carisbrook Cricket Club, the Otago Cricket Association and Union FC, of which he was also the patron. He served as president of the Mornington Bowling Club, was mayor of the Mornington area of Dunedin for a year and was involved with a number of other organisations throughout the city. He founded a firm of funeral directors during the 1880s and was a prominent Dunedin businessman.

Hope was married and had five children. He died at Dunedin in 1950 aged 83. In a 2010 publication he was the only New Zealand first-class cricketer who was identified as being of Jewish heritage. (Note: Note that Louis Joel, who played one match for Otago in 1899, was certainly Jewish, and Harry Siedeberg, who played for Otago and New Zealand before World War I, had Jewish ancestry.)
