= Margaret Kidd =

Scottish legal advocate, editor and politician (1900–1989)

Dame Margaret Kidd DBE, QC
- Born: 14 March 1900; Carriden, near Bo'ness, Scotland
- Died: 22 March 1989 (aged 89); Cambridge, England
- Other name: Margaret Henderson MacDonald
- Education: Linlithgow Academy
- Alma mater: University of Edinburgh
- Occupations: advocate, King's Counsel, sheriff, editor
- Years active: 1923–1974
- Known for: first woman member of the Faculty of Advocates (1923) first British woman King's Counsel (1948) first woman advocate to appear before the House of Lords and before a parliamentary select committee
- Spouse(s): Donald Somerled MacDonald WS, 22 March 1930–1958 (his death)
- Children: 1 daughter
- Father: James Kidd (politician) (1872–1928)
- Awards: Honorary LLD, University of Dundee (1981); Honorary LLD, University of Edinburgh (1984)

Dame Margaret Henderson Kidd, Mrs MacDonald, DBE, QC (14 March 1900 – 22 March 1989) was a Scottish legal advocate, editor and politician. She was the first woman to become a member of the Faculty of Advocates, the first woman advocate to appear before the House of Lords and before a parliamentary select committee and in 1948, the first British woman King's counsel.

== Early life ==
Kidd was born on 14 March 1900 in Carriden, near Bo'ness in West Lothian, Scotland. She was the elder daughter of nine children to Janet Gardner Kidd (née Turnbull, 1872–1930), a schoolteacher, and James Kidd (1872–1928), solicitor and Unionist MP for Linlithgowshire. She was educated at Linlithgow Academy and the University of Edinburgh, graduating in 1922 with an MA and LLB.

== Career ==
Kidd had hoped to pursue a diplomatic career however this was not considered possible despite the Sex Disqualification (Removal) Act 1919. She undertook her professional legal training at Mitchell and Baxter, Writers to the Signet in Edinburgh, and in July 1923 qualified as an Advocate becoming the Faculty of Advocates first female member. She remained the only female member of the Faculty until 1948. Her legal practice was varied with a focus on family law.

After the death of her father in 1928 she contested his parliamentary seat at the by-election, also as a Unionist, but was defeated by Emanuel Shinwell.

She was the first woman advocate to appear before the House of Lords and before a parliamentary select committee. In 1948, she became the first British woman King's Counsel in Britain: Frances Moran was the first woman to take silk in the British Isles, having become an Irish senior counsel in 1941. She was appointed Sheriff Principal, the first woman to occupy this position, for Dumfries and Galloway in 1960, and from 1966 to her retirement in 1974 Sheriff Principal of Perth and Angus. She was the editor of the Court of Session law reports of the Scots Law Times from 1942 to 1976.

Kidd served as Keeper of the Advocates Library 1956–1969.

Apart from her legal work she maintained an active public and charitable role. She was a founder member of the Stair Society and a vice-president of the Federation of University Women and the Electrical Association for Women. She had then become the vice-president of the Federation of University Women Queen's Nursing Institute. Kidd also championed improvements to women's access to work and promoted equal opportunities. In 1930, she made a speech at the University of Glasgow entitled "Law as a Profession of Women" where she commented on the difficulty of being a female advocate given they were dependent on male solicitors for work, and discussed how old lawyers were "inclined to be distrustful of women". The Scotsman reported: "she did not want them to think that she had not received fair play. She had had an easy time, but she did not think that she had been so successful as she would have been had she been a man."

== Awards ==
She was made a Dame Commander of the Order of the British Empire in the 1975 Birthday Honours. She received an honorary LLD from the University of Dundee in 1982 and the University of Edinburgh in 1984.

== Personal life ==
In 1930, she married Donald Somerled MacDonald, WS. They had a daughter, Anne. Her husband died in 1958. Margaret had a number of interests beyond the law, including politics. She supported Scotland remaining in the United Kingdom, and believed that trade would grow worse if Scotland became independent.

== Death ==
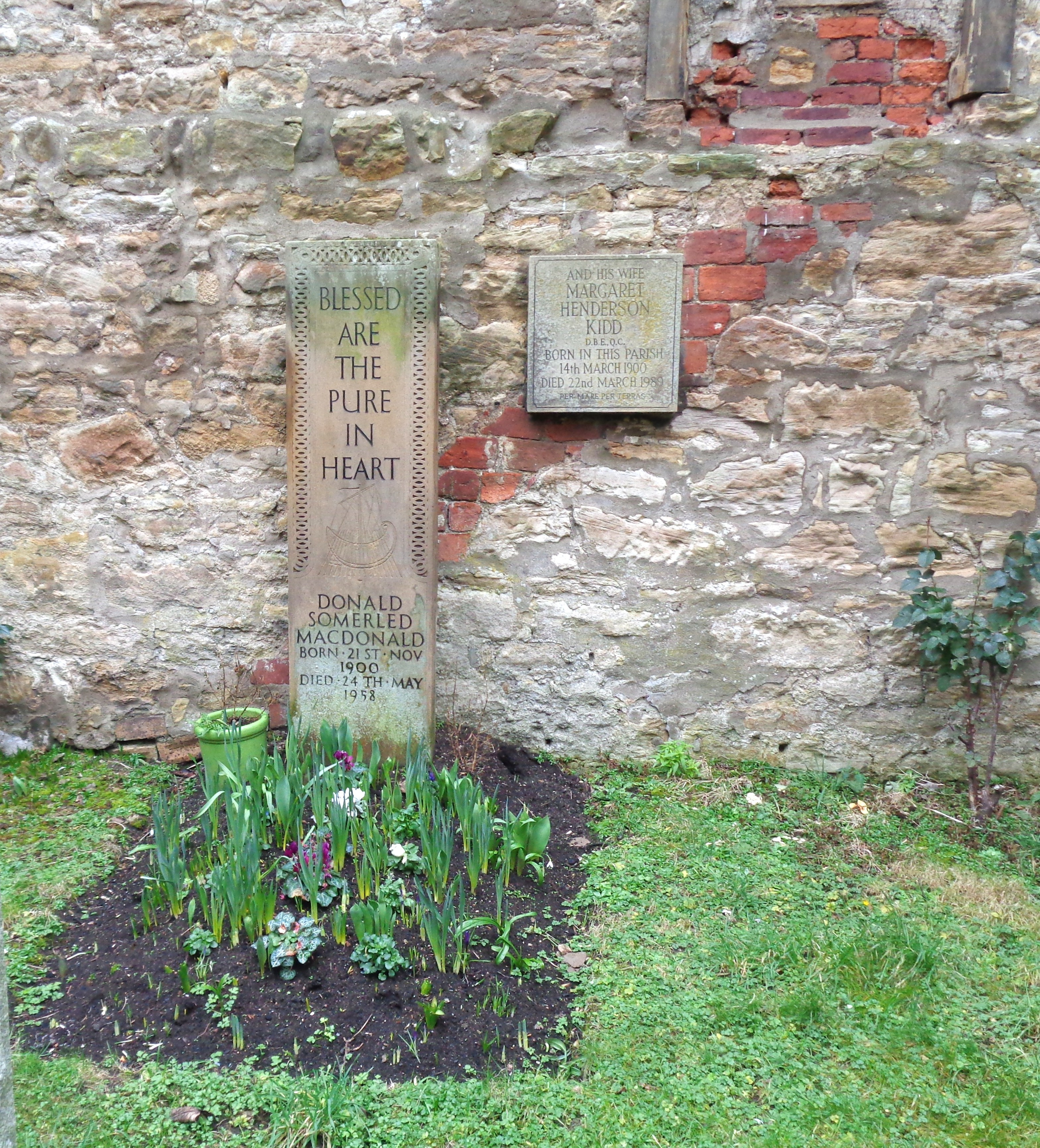
The grave site of Margaret Kidd and her husband at Carriden old church, Bo'ness.

She died on 22 March 1989 in Cambridge, England, aged 89. A funeral service was held at the Canongate Kirk, Edinburgh. A eulogy by Lord Hope of Craighead concluded: "Her success was won by strength of character, courage and integrity and it is a mark of her true qualities that, despite what might seem to be the revolutionary nature of her achievements, she always held the affection and respect of others."

== See also ==
- First women lawyers around the world
