= Gabrielle Hope =

New Zealand painter

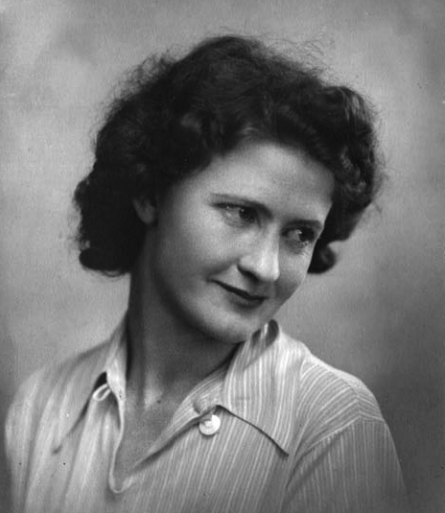
- Gabrielle, aged 21 years
- Born: Gabrielle Valerie Hyacinthe Allan; 4 February 1916; Lower Hutt, New Zealand
- Died: 9 September 1962 (aged 46); Howick, New Zealand
- Known for: Painting

Gabrielle Valerie Hyacinthe Hope (formerly Yeats, née Allan; 4 February 1916 – 9 September 1962) was a New Zealand painter known for her watercolours and drawings. Her work consists of still lives, landscapes, portraits, and works featuring animals. She preferred to sign her works simply as "GABRIELLE."

== Early life ==
Hope was born Gabrielle Valerie Hyacinthe Allan in Lower Hutt on 4 February 1916 to Lois Elaine Stuart-Menteath and Charles Gabriel Allan. Much of her early life was spent at her family's farm near Putāruru. She rode ponies to school, worked with cattle for the agricultural & pastoral shows, and helped with animal care, hay-making and food preservation. This knowledge of animals and farm landscape would later come into play in her work.

After a family move to Rotorua, she attended high school at the Diocesan School for Girls, Auckland. Though often reprimanded for "scribbling" in her books and drawing instead of studying, she completed her studies and graduated in 1932.

She married Christopher Yeats in 1939 and had two children, Bridget and Kit.

== Career ==
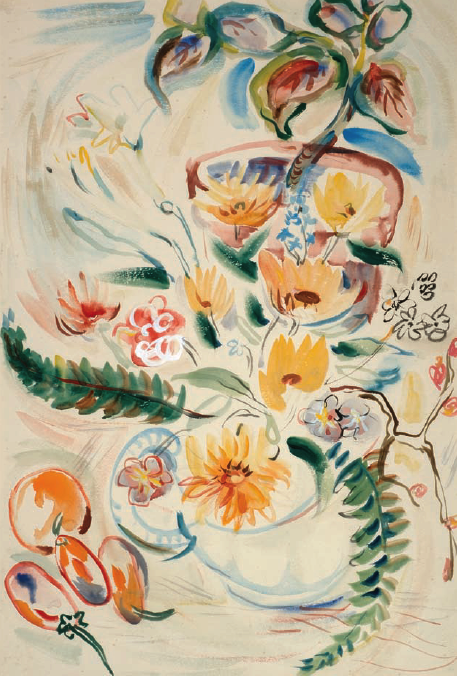
Fruit and Flowers (1951), watercolor on paper.

While living with Yeats and their children in Whitford, Gabrielle began to paint with watercolours more frequently and develop her skills. She painted in the countryside alone or with friends, including Geoff Fairburn and Robert Nettleton Field. For a short time she studied life drawing with tutors including Archibald Fisher at the Elam School of Fine Arts, though the challenge of commute and her family's needs caused her to stop. The family lived together for a short time at Waiheke Island and continued holidaying there for many years. A number of Gabrielle's works feature the beach there, its pigeons and seagulls, its people and its landscapes.

In 1950 after her marriage to Yeats ended, she moved to Parnell in Auckland and began painting more seriously. Gabrielle worked part time at a photography studio retouching and colouring photographs. She also made connections with local artists, getting involved with the local Workers' Educational Association and hosting weekly life drawing sessions for the group at her house. Gabrielle began to have opportunities to show her works in galleries and exhibitions, including with the Auckland Society of Arts and the Waikato Society of Arts.

She married local artist and newspaper proofreader Paul Hope in November 1953. The next year they moved to Forrest Hill with Gabrielle's children. She began to experiment more with her painting at this time, trying new materials such as egg tempera, gouache and Chinese brushes, and expanding her subject matter to include more philosophical and religious themes, including Buddhism, Zen and the tao of painting.

Her second marriage ended in the late 1950s. After a turbulent relationship with Pat Hitchings and multiple moves, Gabrielle died suddenly of a stroke on 9 September 1962, in Howick.

== Work ==
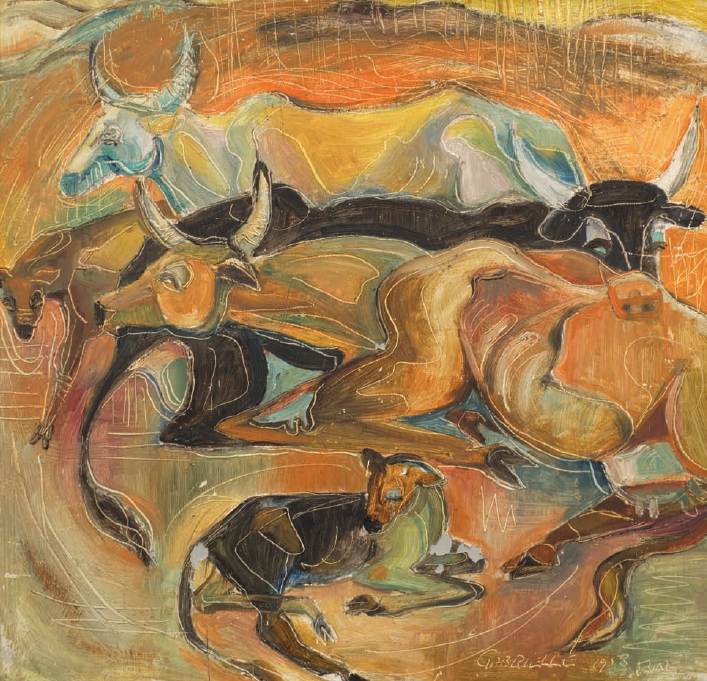
Cattle at Rest (1953)

Gabrielle's primary media were watercolour and gouache, which she enjoyed because of their ability to layer colour with spontaneity and without the time constraints of oil paints. She was influenced early on by the portraiture of Augustus John. Later, Pablo Picasso's influence can be seen in Gabrielle's paintings of bulls and other animals. In her 1953 painting Cattle at Rest, Gabrielle used the sgraffito technique used in Picasso's later ceramics and paintings. In 1953, art critic Tom Bolster described her work in the yearly Auckland Society of Arts exhibition as "sensitively drawn without being mawkish."

Ross Fraser, who met Gabrielle in 1955 and knew her until her death, has said that she had "sympathetic interest in individuals, in the human condition, and in the miraculous and inexhaustible morphology of the animal world."

By 1954, Gabrielle was using techniques from Chinese painting books, and her style became more bold, gestural and avant-garde. After her work was displayed at a solo gallery exhibition at Peter Webb's gallery in 1957, Imric Porsolt described her as having an "engaging lack of discipline, and no pretensions to deliver a message." He said her paintings "delight more by healthy colour than by firm composition, and by directness rather than by elaboration."
