= Lord Hope =

Lord Hope may refer to:

- John Hope, Lord Hope (1794–1858), Lord Justice Clerk of Scotland 1841–58
- David Hope, Baron Hope of Craighead (born 1938), senior judge
- David Hope, Baron Hope of Thornes (born 1940), former Archbishop of York
- A subsidiary title of the Marquess of Linlithgow, created in 1703

== See also ==
- Howling Laud Hope (born 1942), leader of the Official Monster Raving Loony Party
