= James Hope (1807–1854) =

Scottish soldier and politician (1807–1854)

The Honourable James Hope

Member of Parliament (MP) for Linlithgowshire
- In office 1835–1838
- Preceded by: Sir Alexander Hope
- Succeeded by: Charles Hope

Personal details
- Born: 7 June 1807
- Died: 7 January 1854 (aged 46) Featherstone Castle, Haltwhistle, Northumberland, England
- Party: Conservative
- Spouse: Lady Mary Frances Nugent (m. 1837)
- Parents: John Hope, 4th Earl of Hopetoun (father); Louisa Dorothea Wedderburn (mother)
- Relatives: Charles Hope (brother); John Hope (brother); Alexander Hope (uncle); Thomas Wallace (uncle)
- Military career
- Allegiance: United Kingdom
- Branch: British Army
- Rank: Lieutenant-Colonel
- Unit: Coldstream Guards

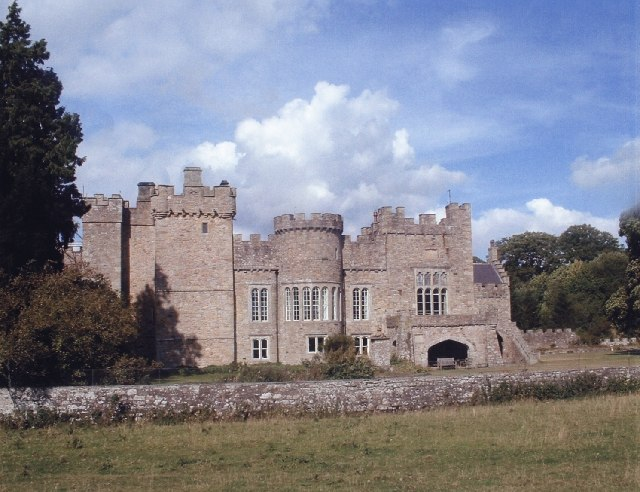
Featherstone Castle in Northumberland, which Hope inherited from his uncle

James Hope (7 June 1807 – 7 January 1854), later known as James Hope-Wallace, was a Scottish soldier, landowner and politician.

== Biography ==
A younger son of General John Hope, 4th Earl of Hopetoun, and his second wife Louisa Dorothea Wedderburn, he served in the Coldstream Guards, where he gained the rank of Lieutenant-Colonel.

He was elected unopposed at the 1835 general election as a Conservative Member of Parliament (MP) for Linlithgowshire, and re-elected against a Liberal Party opponent in 1837. He resigned from the House of Commons in 1838, by the procedural advice of accepting appointment as Steward of the Chiltern Hundreds.

He changed his name to Hope-Wallace on 4 March 1837, in connection with inheriting the estates of his uncle Lord Wallace (1768–1844), including Featherstone Castle in Northumberland.

He served at some point as a Deputy Lieutenant of Linlithgowshire.

He died on 7 January 1854 at Haltwhistle, Northumberland.

== Family ==
On 4 March 1837, he married Lady Mary Frances Nugent (1811–1904), daughter of George Frederick Nugent, 7th Earl of Westmeath, and his second wife Lady Elizabeth Emily Moore. Their son John George Frederick Hope-Wallace (1839–1900) in 1867 married Mary Frances Drinkwater Bethune (1847–1929), eldest child of Admiral Charles Ramsay Bethune, and had seven children.

A great-grandson was the critic Philip Hope-Wallace CBE and his sister was Jacqueline Hope-Wallace CBE, a senior civil servant who was the partner of the author Dame Veronica Wedgwood.

Parliament of the United Kingdom
| Preceded by Sir Alexander Hope | Member of Parliament for Linlithgowshire; 1835 – 1838 | Succeeded by Charles Hope |
