= Jimmy Hope (footballer) =

Scottish footballer

Personal information
- Full name: James Gibson Hope
- Date of birth: 11 September 1919
- Place of birth: Glasgow, Scotland
- Date of death: 20 January 1979 (aged 59)
- Place of death: Hawick, Scotland
- Position: Winger

Youth career
- Ardeer Recreation

Senior career*
Years	Team	Apps	(Gls)
1946–1947	Manchester City	7	(0)
1947–1948	Queen of the South	4	(0)
1948–1949	Arbroath	6	(0)
- Elgin City
Total		17	(0)
- * Club domestic league appearances and goals

James Gibson Hope (11 September 1919 – 20 January 1979) was a Scottish footballer, who played as a winger in the Football League for Manchester City.
