= John Hope (British Army officer, born 1765) =

Lieutenant-General Sir John Hope GCH
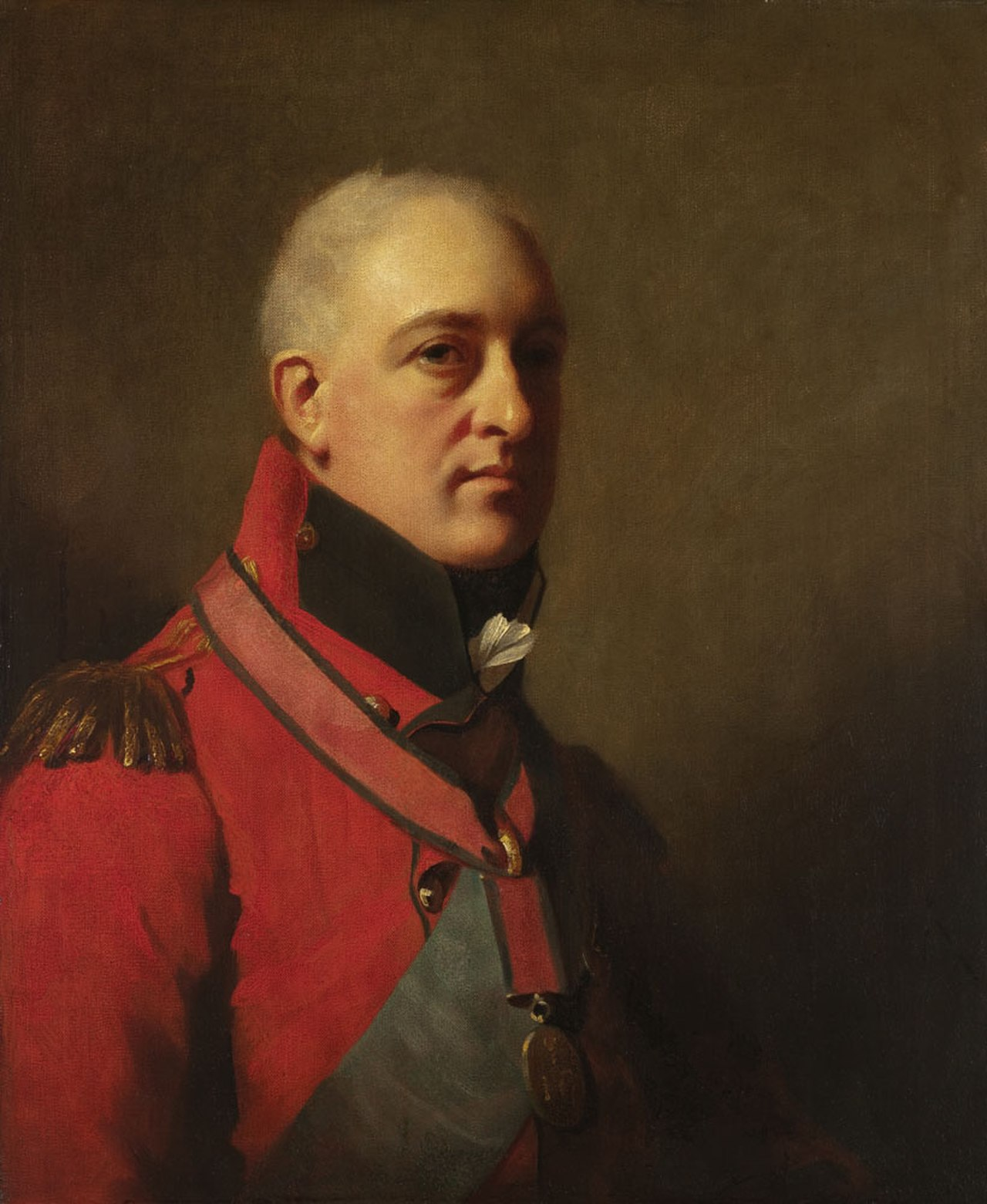
- Born: 15 July 1765
- Died: August 1836 (aged 71)
- Military career
- Allegiance: Kingdom of Great Britain (pre Acts of Union 1800); United Kingdom (post Acts of Union 1800)
- Branch: British Army
- Rank: Lieutenant-General
- Conflicts: Napoleonic Wars; Peninsular War

Lieutenant-General Sir John Hope GCH (15 July 1765 – August 1836) was a Scottish officer of the British Army who was a commander under the Duke of Wellington during the Peninsular War.

== Personal life and family ==
John Hope was born 15 July 1765. His father was the politician and writer of the same name. His mother, Mary, committed suicide in June 1767, leaving young John and his two brothers, Charles and William, to be cared for by their father. Charles Hope became a Member of Parliament and high court judge, while William Johnstone Hope joined the Royal Navy, eventually rising to the rank of Vice Admiral.

Hope married the daughter of a Scottish laird, Margaret Scott of Logie, Forfar, on 20 September 1806. They had three daughters. Scott died in March 1813, while Hope was at home recuperating, following the Battle of Salamanca. Hope married again the following year to Jane Hester Macdougall, with whom he had ten children, although only four survived infancy.

Hope died in August 1836 and in 1856, his widow, Jane, married the Reverend William Knight, the nephew of Jane Austen. Jane Knight died in Brighton in 1880, at the age of ninety, having also outlived her second husband.

== Career ==
Hope joined the Scots Brigade as a cadet in 1778. The Brigade, in the service of the Dutch Republic, was then stationed at Bergen op Zoom and later moved to Maastricht. He had reached the rank of Captain when like other officers he left the Dutch service in 1782 during the Fourth Anglo-Dutch War and was on half-pay until 29 September 1787, when he joined the 60th Foot (Royal American Regiment), but the regiment was reduced and he was briefly on half-pay again before joining the 13th Light Dragoons on 30 June 1788.

In February 1793, shortly after the French Revolutionary War had begun, Hope served as aide-de-camp to Sir William Erskine in the Flanders Campaign. On 25 March 1795, a few days after Erskine's death, Hope was promoted to major in the 28th Light Dragoons, becoming lieutenant-colonel of that regiment on 20 February 1796. Sent to the Cape Colony, the 28th, under Hope's command, helped to rebuff a Dutch attempt in August, to reclaim the colony.

Hope commanded at the Cape until 1799 when he returned to England before taking command of the 37th Foot on 19 April. In March 1800, Hope and the 37th sailed from Gibraltar for the West Indies. Rejoining the 60th as lieutenant-general in June 1804, Hope served as assistant adjudant-general in Scotland. He was deputy adjutant-general under Lord Cathcart at Hanover and then at Copenhagen. In 1812 he was sent to the Peninsula and commanded a brigade of the 5th Division under Sir James Leith, at the Battle of Salamanca. Hope was also at Salamanca, commanding the 7th Division.

=== Salamanca ===
By June 1812, Wellington's army had captured the three forts around, and driven the French from, the city of Salamanca. Marshal Marmont took his army some 30 miles (48 km) upstream of the Douro but Wellington refused to do battle there, forcing the French to advance. Wellington was, in turn, obliged to retreat in order to protect his supply lines.

Marmont sought to intercept the British by force marching his army along a parallel route but after six days trying to outpace the British, the French line had become over-stretched. Wellington, seeing an opportunity, initially sent his 3rd division under Edward Pakenham to attack the French vanguard followed by Hope's brigade and the rest of the 5th to attack the centre.

A subsequent cavalry charge was sufficient to scatter two French divisions. Wellington's troops then began attacking the French Army piecemeal. Eventually the French retreated and escaped over a bridge that Wellington had, erroneously, assumed was guarded by Spanish troops.

=== Later career ===
Hope left the Peninsula on 23 September 1812, having been sent home for medical reasons. Wellington opined in his report that he was sorry to lose Hope, as "... he was very attentive to his duties". Later, Hope commanded in Ireland and then his native Scotland where on 21 April 1819, he was promoted to Lieutenant-general. Hope served as a colonel in the 92nd Highlanders from 29 January 1820 and, later in the year, was made a Knight Grand Cross of the Royal Guelphic Order, although this being a Hanoverian order he was not called Sir John until he was made a Knight Bachelor in 1821. On 6 September 1823, he became colonel of the 72nd Highlanders. Hope died at his Scottish home in August 1836.

== Bibliography ==
- This article incorporates text from a publication now in the public domain: "Hope, John (1765-1836)". Dictionary of National Biography. London: Smith, Elder & Co. 1885–1900.
- Obituary – Lt.-Gen. Sir John Hope, The Gentleman's Magazine, Volumes 160-161, December 1836, pp. 653–654
- Heathcote, T. A. (2010). Wellington's Peninsular War Generals and Their Battles. Barnsley: Pen and Sword Books. ISBN 978-1-84884-061-4.

Military offices
Preceded by Henry Wynyard	Commander-in-Chief, Scotland; 1816–1819	Succeeded by Sir Thomas Bradford
