= George Johnstone Hope =

Royal Navy admiral

Rear-Admiral Sir George Johnstone Hope KCB
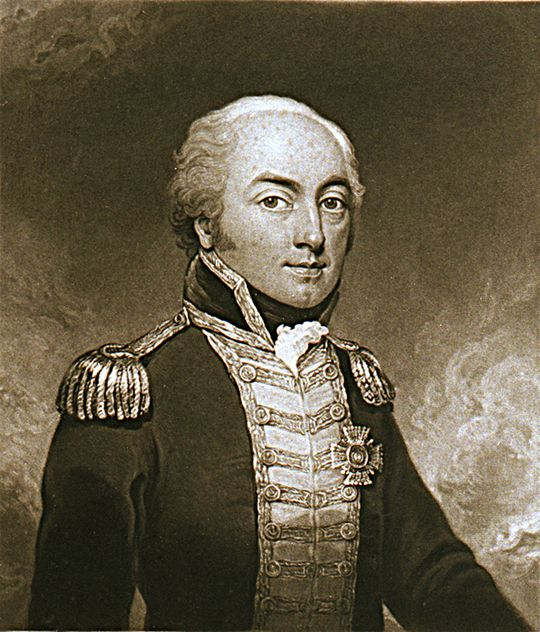
- Rear-Admiral Sir George Johnstone Hope KCB
- Born: 6 July 1767; Scotland
- Died: 2 May 1818 (aged 50); London
- Military career
- Allegiance: United Kingdom
- Branch: Royal Navy
- Service years: 1781-1818
- Rank: Rear-Admiral of the White
- Commands: HMS Defence
- Conflicts: Napoleonic Wars; Battle of Trafalgar; War of 1812
- Awards: KCB; Commander of the Order of the Sword
- Other work: Member of Parliament

Rear-Admiral Sir George Johnstone Hope, KCB, KSO (6 July 1767 – 2 May 1818) was a British naval officer, who served with distinction in the Royal Navy throughout the French Revolutionary and Napoleonic Wars, including service at the Battle of Trafalgar. A close personal friend of Admiral Nelson, he received many honours following the battle, and later served as a Lord of the Admiralty.

== Early life ==
Born the son of The Hon. Charles Hope-Weir, and grandson of Charles Hope, 1st Earl of Hopetoun, Hope joined the navy at 15, in 1782, and spent much of his early career serving on frigates. He was promoted from midshipman to lieutenant on 29 February 1788 and was given command of his own sloop, HMS Racehorse on 22 November 1790.

== War service ==
At the time of Britain's entry into the war, as part of the First Coalition, Hope was serving as commander in the sloop HMS Bulldog in the Mediterranean Sea, and conducted several convoys to the forces of Lord Hood, who was besieging Toulon at the time. Later in the year, on 13 September 1793, he was promoted to the rank of Post Captain, and in August 1794, given command of the large frigate HMS Romulus, in which he saw action against French ships off Genoa in 1795.

Following his appointment to HMS Alcmene, Hope joined Nelson at Aboukir bay, 11 days after the battle of the Nile. On 19 August Nelson left for Naples but left Hood with three 3rd rates and three frigates, including Alcmene, with which to blockade Alexandria, where the remaining French ships; two of the line, eight frigates and four corvettes, were sheltering. Hope obtained Nelson's good graces by capturing the French gunbrig Légère off Egypt, and seizing dispatches intended for Napoleon. The papers had been thrown overboard by the French captain but two of Alcmene's crew jumped in to retrieve them. Hope then sailed to Naples and successfully evacuated the Neapolitan royal family in the face of a Republican uprising, which was eventually quelled by Nelson's personal intervention.

By 1801, Hope was an experienced Mediterranean campaigner, and, in command of the frigate HMS Leda, supported the successful amphibious landings which began the British invasion of Egypt.

== Battle of Trafalgar ==
Following the Peace of Amiens, Hope returned to sea aboard the 74-gun ship of the line HMS Defence. When Spain entered the war in December 1804, Defence became part of a newly formed 'Spanish Squadron' under Sir John Orde. The squadron was involved in the blockade of Cádiz when on 8 April 1805, Villeneuve arrived with 11 ships of the line and 6 frigates. The 6 British ships formed line of battle but the French refused to engage and allowed the squadron to retreat to Lagos Bay. Villeneuve gathered the ships that were ready to sail and put to sea again. Orde believed they were bound for the Channel but in fact Villeneuve was on his way to the West Indies. Orde therefore took his squadron, including Defence, north to rendezvous with the Channel Fleet.

Rear Admiral Sir George Johnstone Hope

Hope and his ship Defence stayed with the Channel fleet until the end of August then joined another squadron under Sir Robert Calder. This squadron was sent to Cadiz, arriving on 15 September, to find Villeneuve's fleet back from the West Indies and under blockade from a small contingent of vessels under the command of Vice-Admiral Cuthbert Collingwood. Nelson arrived on the 29th and moved the bulk of his force out to sea, in an attempt to lure out the combined French and Spanish fleet. When Villeneuve eventually ordered his fleet to sail on 19 October, Defence was one of the ships that passed the signal to Nelson.

On the morning of 21 October 1805, Hope found his ship at the rear of Admiral Collingwood's division at the start of the Battle of Trafalgar. The position of his ship prevented Hope engaging with the enemy until the battle was two and a half hours old, but once within range, the Defence was heavily engaged, fighting with the French ship Berwick (formerly of the Royal Navy), and then the Spanish ship San Ildefenso, whose surrender Hope received after some hours of battle.

Hope sensibly anchored both ships during the ensuing storm, and so his prize was one of only four captured ships to survive the following week of gales. It was Nelson's desire that the fleet anchor after the battle but his order was never passed on and Hope made the decision on his own initiative. During the action and storm, and despite being heavily engaged during the close of the battle; Hope's crew suffered casualties of just seven dead and twenty-nine injured.

After the storm, Collingwood, now in charge, selected Hope and four other captains to sink the remaining prizes to prevent their recapture. Evacuating the crews was "a particularly arduous task in a high sea running" that earned Hope a mention in dispatches.

== Later years ==
Following his action at Trafalgar, Hope continued to serve in the Defence until 1809, when he was appointed Captain of the Fleet. Under Sir James Saumarez, with his flag in HMS Victory, Hope helped to defend and maintain British trade interests in the Baltic Sea. Hope remained Saumarez's chief of staff until 12 August 1811 when he was made Rear-Admiral of the Blue through seniority and good service, and on 21 August 1812, was promoted to Rear Admiral of the White.

In June 1812 Napoleon invaded Russia and Hope was sent back to the Baltic to rescue as much of the Russian fleet as could be saved from the French invasion, and bring it to Britain. The plan was never fully enacted due to the defeat of Napoleon.

Hope was rewarded with a position as one of the Lords of the Admiralty, a post he retained for the next six years. His service ended abruptly, when he died suddenly whilst working late at the Admiralty on the evening of 2 May 1818. He had served as a Member of Parliament for East Grinstead, Sussex, from 1815 and on 2 January that year, had been inducted as a Knight Commander of the Order of the Bath. He also received a sword of honour and gold medal in recognition of his service at Trafalgar. Hope was buried in Westminster Abbey, where a large wall-mounted memorial by Peter Turnerelli remains to his memory, although his tombstone has been removed to make way for later burials.

== Family ==
George Johnstone Hope married his cousin, Lady Jemima Hope, the daughter of James Hope-Johnstone, 3rd Earl of Hopetoun. Lady Hope died in 1808 leaving her husband with two young children. Their son Sir James Hope (1808–81) also became a naval officer and rose to the rank of Admiral of the Fleet. Hope was remarried in 1814 to Georgina, daughter of George Kinnaird, 7th Lord Kinnaird, who bore him a second daughter.

Parliament of the United Kingdom
| Preceded by James Stephen; George Gunning | Member of Parliament for East Grinstead; 1815–1818; With: George Gunning | Succeeded by Lord Strathavon; George Gunning |
