= John Hope (meteorologist) =

American meteorologist, hurricane specialist for The Weather Channel (1919-2002)

- Born: May 14, 1919; Pennsylvania, U.S.
- Died: June 13, 2002 (aged 83); Macon, Georgia, U.S.
- Scientific career
- Fields: Meteorology

John Raymond Hope (May 14, 1919 – June 13, 2002) was an American meteorologist who specialized in hurricane forecasting and was an on-air personality on The Weather Channel.

== Life history ==
Born in Pennsylvania, Hope served as a flight navigator in the United States Army Air Forces during World War II. After returning to civilian life, Hope earned a degree in meteorology from the University of Illinois. In 2002, he died from complications of open heart surgery.

== National Weather Service ==
Hope worked as a forecaster with the National Weather Service in Memphis, Tennessee, for thirteen years. When astronaut John Glenn made his famous spaceflight in 1962, Hope served on the mission's meteorological team. In 1968, Hope began working for the National Hurricane Center in Miami, Florida. While at the center, Hope began receiving recognition for his technical achievements in hurricane forecasting. During this time, he developed a theorem commonly known as the John Hope Rule. It consists of two sub-theorems. One, that if a system is not a bona fide tropical storm before crossing the Windward Islands, or the Lesser Antilles, it will not survive the trek across the Eastern Caribbean Sea. If the wave is still present, formation in the Western Caribbean is possible. The second portion is, that if the structure of a wave or storm is good, never discount it or write it off.

== The Weather Channel ==
After retiring from thirty two years with the National Weather Service, John Hope joined The Weather Channel when it was created in 1982. With his calm on-air demeanor, Hope became quickly recognized as The Weather Channel's in-house hurricane expert. In 1989 when Hurricane Hugo struck South Carolina, Hope spent several hours on the air warning the channel's viewers of the approaching hurricane's danger. Some credit Hope with saving lives during the storm due to his tireless on-air efforts. He would continue to appear on-air for the channel's Tropical Updates until his death, by which time full-time duties had passed to Steve Lyons. Hope was interred at Riverside Cemetery in Macon, Georgia.

== Source of Camille name on hurricane naming list ==
Hope's daughter, Camille, graduated from high school in 1969. Although "Carol" was assigned to the 1969 list of names, there was concern over reusing the retired name, as papers continued to be published about its 1954 incarnation. Dr. Banner Miller was impressed with Camille Hope's high school project, which involved hurricane research, and asked her father to add her name to the list of potential hurricane names that year. They had no way of knowing that the storm named after Hope's daughter — Camille — would become one of the most powerful and destructive hurricanes to ever hit the United States when it slammed into Mississippi as a Category 5 hurricane. Camille Hope is married to former U.S. Representative Jim Marshall of Georgia.
