= Jack Hope =

English–American producer (1900–1962)

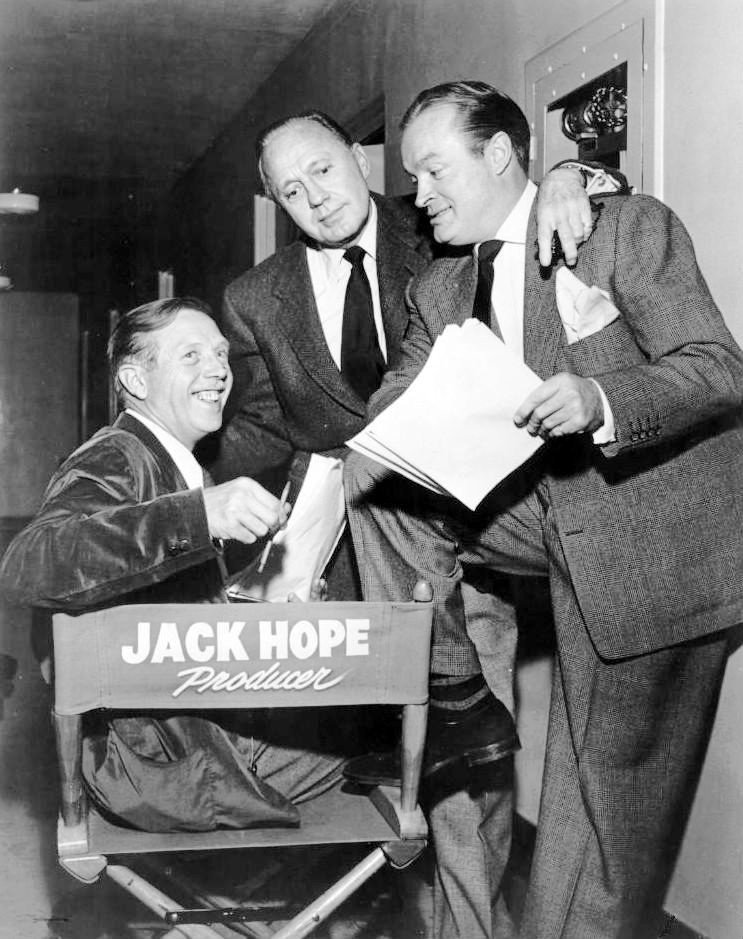
- Jack Hope (left) with Jack Benny (middle) and brother Bob (right) in 1954
- Born: William John Hope; June 20, 1900; Eltham, Kent, England
- Died: August 6, 1962 (aged 62); Los Angeles, California, U.S.
- Occupations: Film and television producer
- Relatives: Bob Hope (brother)

William John Hope (June 20, 1900 – August 6, 1962) was an English–American film and television producer.

== Biography ==
Hope was born in Eltham, Kent (now part of London), England, he was the fourth of seven sons. His English father, William Henry Hope, was a stonemason from Weston-super-Mare, Somerset, and his Welsh mother, Avis Townes, was a light opera singer but later had to find work as a charwoman. He and his family emigrated to Cleveland, Ohio, in 1908. His younger brother was actor-entertainer-comedian Bob Hope.

Hope was a producer for movies and television shows including Alias Jesse James in 1959 and Celebrity Golf in 1960.

Hope died from complications from surgery on August 6, 1962, aged 62.
