= Baron Glendevon =

Title in the Peerage of the United Kingdom

Baron Glendevon, of Midhope in the County of Linlithgow, is a title in the Peerage of the United Kingdom. It was created on 16 July 1964 for the Conservative politician Lord John Hope. He was the younger twin son of Victor Hope, 2nd Marquess of Linlithgow. As of 2017 the title is held by his younger son, the third Baron, who succeeded his elder brother in 2009.

== Barons Glendevon (1964) ==
- John Adrian Louis Hope, 1st Baron Glendevon (1912–1996)
- Julian John Somerset Hope, 2nd Baron Glendevon (1950–2009)
- Jonathan Charles Hope, 3rd Baron Glendevon (b. 1952)

There is no heir to the title.

== Family tree ==
Family tree of the Marquesses of Annandale, Marquess of Linlithgow, Earls of Annandale and Hartfell, Earls of Hopetoun, and subsidiary titles

Viscount of Annand and Lord Murray of Lochmaben, c. 1622; Earl of Annandale and Lord Murray of Tyninghame, 1625
John Murray d. 1640; 1st Earl of Annandale, Viscount of Annand, Lord Murray of Lochmaben, and Lord Murray of Tyninghame
Lord Johnston of Lochwood, 1633; Earl of Hartfell and Lord Johnston of Lochwood, Moffatdale and Evandale, 1643
Thomas Hope; 1573–1646; 1st Baronet of Craighall	James Murray d. 1658; 2nd Earl of Annandale, Viscount of Annand, Lord Murray of Lochmaben, and Lord Murray of Tyninghame, 3rd Viscount Stormont	James Johnstone; 1602–1653; 1st Earl of Hartfell, Lord Johnston of Lochwood, and Lord Johnston of Lochwood, Moffatdale and Evandale
Earldom of Annandale extinct, 1658
Resigned earldom of Hartfell and all subsidiary titles, 1661; Twice regranted as Earl of Annandale and Hartfell, 1661 and 1662; Lord Johnstone, 1662
James Hope; 1641–1661	James Johnstone d. 1672; 2nd Earl of Hartfell, Lord Johnston of Lochwood, and Lord Johnston of Lochwood, Moffatdale and Evandale, 1st Earl of Annandale and Hartfell and Lord Johnstone
Marquess of Annandale, 1701
John Hope d. 1682	William Johnstone d. 1721; 1st Marquess of Annandale, 2nd Earl of Annandale and Hartfell and Lord Johnstone
Earl of Hopetoun, Viscount Aithrie, and Lord Hope, 1703
Charles Hope; 1681–1742; 1st Earl of Hopetoun, Viscount Aithrie, and Lord Hope	Henrietta Johnstone; 1682–1750	James Johnstone c. 1687–1730; 2nd Marquess of Annandale, 3rd Earl of Annandale and Hartfell and Lord Johnstone	George Vanden-Bempde; 1720–1792; 3rd Marquess of Annandale, 4th Earl of Annandale and Hartfell and Lord Johnstone
Marquessate of Annandale and Earl of Annandale and Hartfell extinct, 1792
Charles Hope-Weir; 1710–1791	John Hope; 1704–1781; 2nd Earl of Hopetoun, Viscount Aithrie, and Lord Hope
Baron Hopetoun, 1809; Earl of Annandale and Hartfell claimed but not recognized
John Hope; 1739–1785	James Hope-Johnstone; 1741–1816; 3nd Earl of Hopetoun, Viscount Aithrie, and Lord Hope, 1st Baron Hopetoun, de jure 5th Earl of Annandale and Hartfell and Lord Johnstone
Baron Niddry, 1816
William Johnstone Hope; 1766–1831	Anne Hope-Johnstone; 1768–1818 de jure 6th Countess of Annandale and Hartfell and Lord Johnstone	John Hope; 1765–1823; 4th Earl of Hopetoun, Viscount Aithrie, and Lord Hope, 2nd Baron Hopetoun, 1st Baron Niddry	Alexander Hope; 1769–1837
John James Hope-Johnstone; 1796–1876 de jure 7th Earl of Annandale and Hartfell and Lord Johnstone	John Hope; 1803–1843; 5th Earl of Hopetoun, Viscount Aithrie, and Lord Hope, 3rd Baron Hopetoun, 2nd Baron Niddry	James Hope-Scott; 1812–1873
William James Hope Johnstone; 1819–1850	John Alexander Hope; 1831–1873; 6th Earl of Hopetoun, Viscount Aithrie, and Lord Hope, 4th Baron Hopetoun, 3rd Baron Niddry
Marquess of Linlithgow, 1902	Baron Rankeillour, 1932
John James Hope-Johnstone; 1842–1912 de jure 8th Earl of Annandale and Hartfell and Lord Johnstone	Percy Alexander Hope Johnstone; 1845–1899	John Adrian Louis Hope; 1860–1908; 1st Marquess of Linlithgow, 7th Earl of Hopetoun, Viscount Aithrie, and Lord Hope, 5th Baron Hopetoun, 4th Baron Niddry	James Fitzalan Hope; 1870–1949; 1st Baron Rankeillour
Evelyn Wentworth Hope-Johnstone; 1879–1964 de jure 9th Earl of Annandale and Hartfell and Lord Johnstone	Victor Alexander John Hope; 1887–1952; 2nd Marquess of Linlithgow, 8th Earl of Hopetoun, Viscount Aithrie, and Lord Hope, 6th Baron Hopetoun, 5th Baron Niddry	Arthur Oswald James Hope; 1897–1958; 2nd Baron Rankeillour	Henry John Hope; 1899–1967; 3rd Baron Rankeillour	Richard Frederick Hope; 1901–1964
Baron Glendevon, 1964
Percy Wentworth Hope-Johnstone; 1909–1983 de jure 10th Earl of Annandale and Hartfell and Lord Johnstone	Charles William Frederick Hope; 1912–1987; 3rd Marquess of Linlithgow, 9th Earl of Hopetoun, Viscount Aithrie, and Lord Hope, 7th Baron Hopetoun, 6th Baron Niddry	John Adrian Louis Hope; 1912–1996; 1st Baron Glendevon
Earl of Annandale and Hartfell and Lord Johnstone revived, 1985
Patrick Andrew Wentworth Hope-Johnstone b. 1941; 11th Earl of Annandale and Hartfell and Lord Johnstone	Charles William Frederick Hope b. 1946; 4th Marquess of Linlithgow, 10th Earl of Hopetoun, Viscount Aithrie, and Lord Hope, 8th Baron Hopetoun, 7th Baron Niddry	Julian John Somerset Hope; 1950–2009; 2nd Baron Glendevon	Peter St Thomas More Henry Hope; 1935–2005; 4th Baron Rankeillour	Michael Richard Hope; 1940–2022; 5th Baron Rankeillour
David Patrick Wentworth Hope-Johnstone b. 1971 styled Lord Johnstone; Heir apparent to the Earl of Annandale and Hartfell	Andrew Victor Arthur Charles Hope b. 1969 styled Earl of Hopetoun; Heir apparent to the Marquess of Linlithgow	Jonathan Charles Hope b. 1952; 3rd Baron Glendevon	James Francis Hope b. 1968; 6th Baron Rankeillour

== Arms ==
Coat of arms of Baron Glendevon
Crest A Broken Sphere surmounted by a Rainbow proper issuant from two Bay-leaves slipped Vert on either side of the Sphere. Escutcheon Azure on a Chevron Or between three Bezants as many Bay-leaves paleways Vert. Supporters On either side a Female Figure denoting Hope their Hair dressed Sable and braided Vert garnished Or richly vested Argent garnished of Vert and sustaining bendwise in their exterior hands Light Lifeboat Anchors with long shafts Azure garnished with Chains Or. Motto Spes Mea Non Fracta (My hope is not broken).

== See also ==
- Marquess of Linlithgow
- Baron Rankeillour
- Hope Baronets
