= Baron Rankeillour =

UK Peerage created in 1932 for the politician James Fitzalan Hope

Barony of Rankeillour
- Blazon: Arms:Azure on a Chevron Or between three Bezants a Bay Leaf slipped Vert a Bordure Ermine; Crest: A Broken Globe surmounted by a Rainbow proper
- Creation date: 28 June 1932
- Created by: King George V
- Peerage: Peerage of the United Kingdom
- First holder: James Fitzalan Hope, 1st Baron Rankeillour
- Present holder: James Francis Hope, 6th Baron Rankeillour
- Heir apparent: the Hon. Charlie James Hope
- Motto: AT SPES INFRACTA (But hope is unbroken)

Baron Rankeillour, of Buxted in the County of Sussex, is a title in the Peerage of the United Kingdom. It was created in 1932 for the Conservative politician James Fitzalan Hope. He was the grandson of General Sir Alexander Hope, fourth son of John Hope, 2nd Earl of Hopetoun (from whom the Marquesses of Linlithgow descend; see this title for earlier history of the family). His eldest son, Arthur Hope (from 1949, the second Baron), was also a Conservative politician and held junior ministerial office. From 1940 to 1946 he served as Governor of Madras. He was succeeded by his younger brother, the third Baron, Henry John Hope. After the death of Henry John Hope's only son, the fourth Baron), who was unmarried, in 2005, succession went to his first cousin, the fifth Baron, Michael Richard Hope, who held the title until his death in 2022, and was the eldest son of the Hon. Richard Frederick Hope, who was the youngest son of the first Baron.

The second son of the 2nd Hope baronet of Craighall (who was father of the 8th baronet) served on the Court of Session from 1689 under the judicial title of Lord Rankeillour.

== Barons Rankeillour (1932) ==
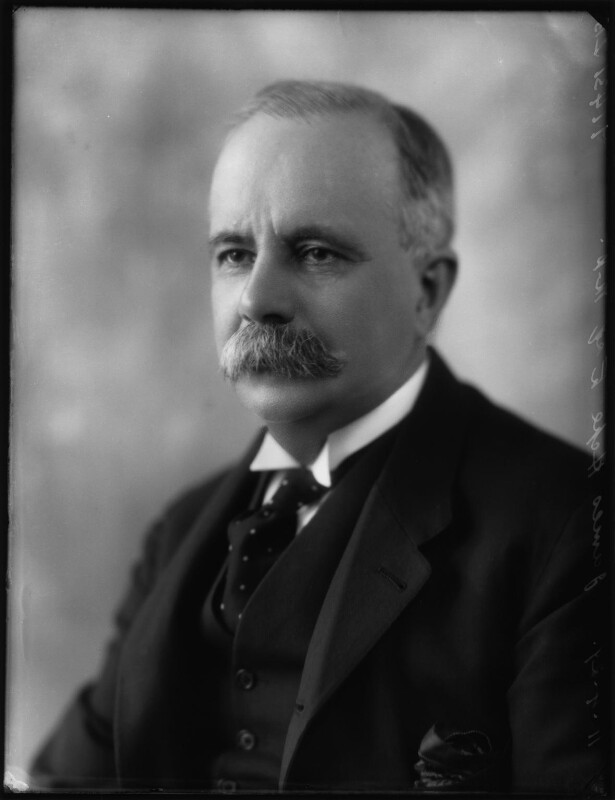
James Hope first Baron

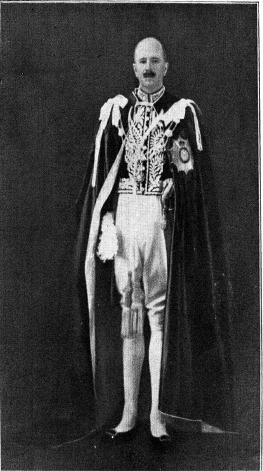
Arthur Hope, second Baron

- James Fitzalan Hope, 1st Baron Rankeillour (1870–1949)
- Arthur Oswald James Hope, 2nd Baron Rankeillour (1897–1958)
- Henry John Hope, 3rd Baron Rankeillour (1899–1967)
- Peter St Thomas More Henry Hope, 4th Baron Rankeillour (1935–2005)
- Michael Richard Hope, 5th Baron Rankeillour (1940–2022)
- James Francis Hope, 6th Baron Rankeillour (b. 1968)

The heir apparent is the present holder's son Hon. Charlie James Hope (b. 2003).

== Family tree ==
Family tree of the Marquesses of Annandale, Marquess of Linlithgow, Earls of Annandale and Hartfell, Earls of Hopetoun, and subsidiary titles

Viscount of Annand and Lord Murray of Lochmaben, c. 1622; Earl of Annandale and Lord Murray of Tyninghame, 1625
John Murray d. 1640; 1st Earl of Annandale, etc.
Lord Johnston of Lochwood, 1633; Earl of Hartfell and Lord Johnston of Lochwood, Moffatdale and Evandale, 1643
Thomas Hope; 1573–1646; 1st Baronet of Craighall	James Murray d. 1658; 2nd Earl of Annandale, etc., 3rd Viscount Stormont	James Johnstone; 1602–1653; 1st Earl of Hartfell, etc.
Earldom of Annandale extinct, 1658
Resigned earldom of Hartfell and all subsidiary titles, 1661; Twice regranted as Earl of Annandale and Hartfell, 1661 and 1662; Lord Johnstone, 1662
James Hope; 1641–1661	James Johnstone d. 1672; 2nd Earl of Hartfell, etc., 1st Earl of Annandale and Hartfell, etc.
Marquess of Annandale, 1701
John Hope d. 1682	William Johnstone d. 1721; 1st Marquess of Annandale, 2nd Earl of Annandale and Hartfell, etc.
Earl of Hopetoun, Viscount Aithrie, and Lord Hope, 1703
Charles Hope; 1681–1742; 1st Earl of Hopetoun, etc.	Henrietta Johnstone; 1682–1750	James Johnstone c. 1687–1730; 2nd Marquess of Annandale, 3rd Earl of Annandale and Hartfell, etc.	George Vanden-Bempde; 1720–1792; 3rd Marquess of Annandale, 4th Earl of Annandale and Hartfell, etc.
Marquessate of Annandale and Earl of Annandale and Hartfell extinct, 1792
Charles Hope-Weir; 1710–1791	John Hope; 1704–1781; 2nd Earl of Hopetoun, etc.
Baron Hopetoun, 1809; Earl of Annandale and Hartfell claimed but not recognized
John Hope; 1739–1785	James Hope-Johnstone; 1741–1816; 3nd Earl of Hopetoun, etc., 1st Baron Hopetoun, de jure 5th Earl of Annandale and Hartfell, etc.
Baron Niddry, 1816
William Johnstone Hope; 1766–1831	Anne Hope-Johnstone; 1768–1818 de jure 6th Countess of Annandale and Hartfell, etc.	John Hope; 1765–1823; 4th Earl of Hopetoun, etc., 2nd Baron Hopetoun, 1st Baron Niddry	Alexander Hope; 1769–1837
John James Hope-Johnstone; 1796–1876 de jure 7th Earl of Annandale and Hartfell, etc.	John Hope; 1803–1843; 5th Earl of Hopetoun, etc., 3rd Baron Hopetoun, 2nd Baron Niddry	James Hope-Scott; 1812–1873
William James Hope Johnstone; 1819–1850	John Alexander Hope; 1831–1873; 6th Earl of Hopetoun, etc., 4th Baron Hopetoun, 3rd Baron Niddry
Marquess of Linlithgow, 1902	Baron Rankeillour, 1932
John James Hope-Johnstone; 1842–1912 de jure 8th Earl of Annandale and Hartfell, etc.	Percy Alexander Hope Johnstone; 1845–1899	John Adrian Louis Hope; 1860–1908; 1st Marquess of Linlithgow, 7th Earl of Hopetoun, etc., 5th Baron Hopetoun, 4th Baron Niddry	James Fitzalan Hope; 1870–1949; 1st Baron Rankeillour
Evelyn Wentworth Hope-Johnstone; 1879–1964 de jure 9th Earl of Annandale and Hartfell, etc.	Victor Alexander John Hope; 1887–1952; 2nd Marquess of Linlithgow, 8th Earl of Hopetoun, etc., 6th Baron Hopetoun, 5th Baron Niddry	Arthur Oswald James Hope; 1897–1958; 2nd Baron Rankeillour	Henry John Hope; 1899–1967; 3rd Baron Rankeillour	Richard Frederick Hope; 1901–1964
Baron Glendevon, 1964
Percy Wentworth Hope-Johnstone; 1909–1983 de jure 10th Earl of Annandale and Hartfell, etc.	Charles William Frederick Hope; 1912–1987; 3rd Marquess of Linlithgow, 9th Earl of Hopetoun, etc., 7th Baron Hopetoun, 6th Baron Niddry	John Adrian Louis Hope; 1912–1996; 1st Baron Glendevon
Earl of Annandale and Hartfell and Lord Johnstone revived, 1985
Patrick Andrew Wentworth Hope-Johnstone b. 1941; 11th Earl of Annandale and Hartfell, etc.	Charles William Frederick Hope b. 1946; 4th Marquess of Linlithgow, 10th Earl of Hopetoun, etc., 8th Baron Hopetoun, 7th Baron Niddry	Julian John Somerset Hope; 1950–2009; 2nd Baron Glendevon	Peter St Thomas More Henry Hope; 1935–2005; 4th Baron Rankeillour	Michael Richard Hope; 1940–2022; 5th Baron Rankeillour
David Patrick Wentworth Hope-Johnstone b. 1971 styled Lord Johnstone; Heir apparent to the Earl of Annandale and Hartfell	Andrew Victor Arthur Charles Hope b. 1969 styled Earl of Hopetoun; Heir apparent to the Marquess of Linlithgow	Jonathan Charles Hope b. 1952; 3rd Baron Glendevon	James Francis Hope b. 1968; 6th Baron Rankeillour

== Line of Succession ==
- James Fitzalan Hope, 1st Baron Rankeillour (1870 - 1949)
  - Arthur Oswald James Hope, 2nd Baron Rankeillour (1897 - 1958)
  - Henry John Hope, 3rd Baron Rankeilliour (1899 - 1967)
    - Peter St Thomas More Hope, 4th Baron Rankeillour (1935 - 2005)
  - Hon. Richard Frederick Hope (1901 - 1964)
    - Michael Richard Hope, 5th Baron Rankeillour (1940 - 2022)
      - James Francis Hope, 6th Baron Rankeillour (1968 -)

== See also ==
- Marquess of Linlithgow
- Baron Glendevon
