= Marquess of Linlithgow =

United Kingdom peerage

Marquessate of Linlithgow
- Arms of Hope: Azure, on a chevron or between three bezants a laurel leaf vert
- Creation date: 23 October 1902
- Created by: King Edward VII
- Peerage: Peerage of the United Kingdom
- First holder: John Hope, 7th Earl of Hopetoun
- Present holder: Alexander Hope, 6th Marquess of Linlithgow
- Heir apparent: Andrew Hope, Earl of Hopetoun
- Remainder to: the 1st Marquess' heirs male of the body lawfully begotten
- Subsidiary titles: Earl of Hopetoun; Viscount Aithrie; Lord Hope; Baron Hopetoun; Baron Niddry
- Seat: Hopetoun House
- Motto: At spes non fracta ("But my hope is not broken")

Marquess of Linlithgow, in the County of Linlithgow or West Lothian, is a title in the Peerage of the United Kingdom. It was created on 23 October 1902 for John Hope, 7th Earl of Hopetoun. The current holder of the title is Adrian Hope.

This branch of the Hope family descends from Sir Charles Hope, grandson of Sir James Hope, sixth son of Sir Thomas Hope, 1st Baronet, of Craighall (see Hope baronets). In 1703 he was created Lord Hope, Viscount Aithrie and Earl of Hopetoun in the Peerage of Scotland, with remainder to the heirs male and female of his body. He later served as Lord Lieutenant of Linlithgowshire and as Governor of the Bank of Scotland. Lord Hopetoun married Lady Henrietta, only surviving daughter of William Johnstone, 1st Marquess of Annandale (died 1721). He was succeeded by his eldest son, the second Earl. In 1763 he succeeded his kinsman as fourth Baronet, of Kirkliston (see Hope baronets for earlier history of this title).

His son from his first marriage, the third Earl, served as Lord Lieutenant of Linlithgowshire from 1794 to 1816 and sat in the House of Lords as a Scottish representative peer from 1784 to 1794. In 1792 Lord Hopetoun succeeded his great-uncle as de jure fifth Earl of Annandale and Hartfell, although he never successfully claimed this title. In 1809 he was created Baron Hopetoun, of Hopetoun in the County of Linlithgow, in the Peerage of the United Kingdom, with remainder to the heirs male of his father. He died without male issue and the claim the earldom passed to his daughter Lady Anne (see below and the Earl of Annandale and Hartfell for later history of this branch of the family). Lord Hopetoun was succeeded (in the barony of Hopetoun according to the special remainder) by his half-brother, the fourth Earl. He was a general in the army, sat as Member of Parliament for Linlithgow and served as Lord Lieutenant of Linlithgowshire. In 1814, two years before he succeeded in the earldom, he was raised to the Peerage of the United Kingdom in his own right as Baron Niddry, of Niddry Castle in the County of Linlithgow.

He was succeeded by his son, the fifth Earl. He was Lord Lieutenant of Linlithgowshire. His son, the sixth Earl, also served as Lord Lieutenant of Linlithgowshire. He was succeeded by his son, the seventh Earl. He was a prominent colonial administrator and Conservative politician and served as Governor of Victoria, as the first Governor-General of Australia and as Secretary of State for Scotland. In 1902 he was created Marquess of Linlithgow, in the County of Linlithgow or West Lothian. His son, the second Marquess, was also a politician and served as Viceroy of India from 1936 to 1943. He was succeeded by his eldest twin son, the third Marquess. He was Lord Lieutenant of West Lothian from 1964 to 1985. As of 2013 the titles are held by his only son, the fourth Marquess, who succeeded in 1985.

The family seat is Hopetoun House, near Queensferry, West Lothian.

== Earls of Hopetoun (1703) ==
Other titles (1st Earl onwards): Viscount Aithrie (Sc 1703), Lord Hope (Sc 1703)
Other titles (3rd Earl onwards): Baron Hopetoun (UK 1809)
Other titles (4th Earl onwards): Baron Niddry (UK 1814)

- Charles Hope, 1st Earl of Hopetoun (1681–1742)
- John Hope, 2nd Earl of Hopetoun, (1704–1781)
- James Hope-Johnstone, 3rd Earl of Hopetoun (1741–1816)
- John Hope, 4th Earl of Hopetoun (1765–1823)
- John Hope, 5th Earl of Hopetoun (1803–1843)
- John Alexander Hope, 6th Earl of Hopetoun (1831–1873)
- John Adrian Louis Hope, 7th Earl of Hopetoun (1860–1908) (created Marquess of Linlithgow in 1902)

== Marquesses of Linlithgow (1902) ==
Other titles (1st Marquess onwards): Viscount Aithrie (Sc 1703), Lord Hope (Sc 1703), Baron Hopetoun (UK 1809), Baron Niddry (UK 1814)

- John Adrian Louis Hope, 1st Marquess of Linlithgow (1860–1908)
- Victor Alexander John Hope, 2nd Marquess of Linlithgow (1887–1952)
- Charles William Frederick Hope, 3rd Marquess of Linlithgow (1912–1987)
- Adrian John Charles Hope, 4th Marquess of Linlithgow (b. 1946)

The heir apparent is the present holder's eldest son, Andrew Christopher Victor Arthur Charles Hope, Earl of Hopetoun (born 1969).

The heir apparent's heir apparent is his elder son, Charles Adrian Bristow William Hope, Viscount Aithrie (born 2001).

== Baron Niddry (1814) ==
- John Hope, 1st Lord Niddry (1765–1823) (succeeded as Earl of Hopetoun in 1816)

== Family tree and line of succession ==
Family tree of the Marquesses of Annandale, Marquess of Linlithgow, Earls of Annandale and Hartfell, Earls of Hopetoun, and subsidiary titles

Viscount of Annand and Lord Murray of Lochmaben, c. 1622; Earl of Annandale and Lord Murray of Tyninghame, 1625
John Murray d. 1640; 1st Earl of Annandale, etc.
Lord Johnston of Lochwood, 1633; Earl of Hartfell and Lord Johnston of Lochwood, Moffatdale and Evandale, 1643
Thomas Hope; 1573–1646; 1st Baronet of Craighall	James Murray d. 1658; 2nd Earl of Annandale, etc., 3rd Viscount Stormont	James Johnstone; 1602–1653; 1st Earl of Hartfell, etc.
Earldom of Annandale extinct, 1658
Resigned earldom of Hartfell and all subsidiary titles, 1661; Twice regranted as Earl of Annandale and Hartfell, 1661 and 1662; Lord Johnstone, 1662
James Hope; 1641–1661	James Johnstone d. 1672; 2nd Earl of Hartfell, etc., 1st Earl of Annandale and Hartfell, etc.
Marquess of Annandale, 1701
John Hope d. 1682	William Johnstone d. 1721; 1st Marquess of Annandale, 2nd Earl of Annandale and Hartfell, etc.
Earl of Hopetoun, Viscount Aithrie, and Lord Hope, 1703
Charles Hope; 1681–1742; 1st Earl of Hopetoun, etc.	Henrietta Johnstone; 1682–1750	James Johnstone c. 1687–1730; 2nd Marquess of Annandale, 3rd Earl of Annandale and Hartfell, etc.	George Vanden-Bempde; 1720–1792; 3rd Marquess of Annandale, 4th Earl of Annandale and Hartfell, etc.
Marquessate of Annandale and Earl of Annandale and Hartfell extinct, 1792
Charles Hope-Weir; 1710–1791	John Hope; 1704–1781; 2nd Earl of Hopetoun, etc.
Baron Hopetoun, 1809; Earl of Annandale and Hartfell claimed but not recognized
John Hope; 1739–1785	James Hope-Johnstone; 1741–1816; 3nd Earl of Hopetoun, etc., 1st Baron Hopetoun, de jure 5th Earl of Annandale and Hartfell, etc.
Baron Niddry, 1816
William Johnstone Hope; 1766–1831	Anne Hope-Johnstone; 1768–1818 de jure 6th Countess of Annandale and Hartfell, etc.	John Hope; 1765–1823; 4th Earl of Hopetoun, etc., 2nd Baron Hopetoun, 1st Baron Niddry	Alexander Hope; 1769–1837
John James Hope-Johnstone; 1796–1876 de jure 7th Earl of Annandale and Hartfell, etc.	John Hope; 1803–1843; 5th Earl of Hopetoun, etc., 3rd Baron Hopetoun, 2nd Baron Niddry	James Hope-Scott; 1812–1873
William James Hope Johnstone; 1819–1850	John Alexander Hope; 1831–1873; 6th Earl of Hopetoun, etc., 4th Baron Hopetoun, 3rd Baron Niddry
Marquess of Linlithgow, 1902	Baron Rankeillour, 1932
John James Hope-Johnstone; 1842–1912 de jure 8th Earl of Annandale and Hartfell, etc.	Percy Alexander Hope Johnstone; 1845–1899	John Adrian Louis Hope; 1860–1908; 1st Marquess of Linlithgow, 7th Earl of Hopetoun, etc., 5th Baron Hopetoun, 4th Baron Niddry	James Fitzalan Hope; 1870–1949; 1st Baron Rankeillour
Evelyn Wentworth Hope-Johnstone; 1879–1964 de jure 9th Earl of Annandale and Hartfell, etc.	Victor Alexander John Hope; 1887–1952; 2nd Marquess of Linlithgow, 8th Earl of Hopetoun, etc., 6th Baron Hopetoun, 5th Baron Niddry	Arthur Oswald James Hope; 1897–1958; 2nd Baron Rankeillour	Henry John Hope; 1899–1967; 3rd Baron Rankeillour	Richard Frederick Hope; 1901–1964
Baron Glendevon, 1964
Percy Wentworth Hope-Johnstone; 1909–1983 de jure 10th Earl of Annandale and Hartfell, etc.	Charles William Frederick Hope; 1912–1987; 3rd Marquess of Linlithgow, 9th Earl of Hopetoun, etc., 7th Baron Hopetoun, 6th Baron Niddry	John Adrian Louis Hope; 1912–1996; 1st Baron Glendevon
Earl of Annandale and Hartfell and Lord Johnstone revived, 1985
Patrick Andrew Wentworth Hope-Johnstone b. 1941; 11th Earl of Annandale and Hartfell, etc.	Charles William Frederick Hope b. 1946; 4th Marquess of Linlithgow, 10th Earl of Hopetoun, etc., 8th Baron Hopetoun, 7th Baron Niddry	Julian John Somerset Hope; 1950–2009; 2nd Baron Glendevon	Peter St Thomas More Henry Hope; 1935–2005; 4th Baron Rankeillour	Michael Richard Hope; 1940–2022; 5th Baron Rankeillour
David Patrick Wentworth Hope-Johnstone b. 1971 styled Lord Johnstone; Heir apparent to the Earl of Annandale and Hartfell	Andrew Victor Arthur Charles Hope b. 1969 styled Earl of Hopetoun; Heir apparent to the Marquess of Linlithgow	Jonathan Charles Hope b. 1952; 3rd Baron Glendevon	James Francis Hope b. 1968; 6th Baron Rankeillour

Line of succession (simplified)
- Victor Hope, 2nd Marquess of Linlithgow (1887–1952)
  - Charles Hope, 3rd Marquess of Linlithgow (1912–1987)
    - Adrian Hope, 4th Marquess of Linlithgow (b. 1946)
      - (1). Andrew Hope, Earl of Hopetoun (b. 1969)
        - (2). Charles Hope, Viscount Aithrie (b. 2001)
        - (3). Hon. Victor Alexander Edward Hope (b. 2001)
      - (4). Lord Alexander John Adrian Hope (b. 1971)
      - (5). Lord Robert Charles Robin Adrian Hope (b. 1984)
  - John Hope, 1st Baron Glendevon (1912–1996)
    - (6, 1). Jonathan Hope, 3rd Baron Glendevon (b. 1952)

There are further male heirs in line to the earldom of Hopetoun and its subsidiary titles, who are descended from the younger sons of the 4th, 2nd and 1st earls.

== Other family members ==
Numerous other members of the Hope of Hopetoun family have also gained distinction. James Hope-Vere (son of William Hope-Vere, eldest son of the Hon. Charles Hope-Weir (1710–1791), second son of the first Earl) represented Ilchester in the House of Commons. Charles Hope (eldest son of John Hope, second son of the Hon. Charles Hope-Weir) was Lord President of the Court of Session under the judicial title of Lord Granton from 1811 to 1836. John Hope, son of Charles Hope, was Lord Justice Clerk of Scotland from 1841 to 1858. His son William Hope was a lieutenant-colonel in the army and recipient of the Victoria Cross. Charles Hope (1798–1854), son of Charles Hope, Lord Granton, was a rear-admiral in the Royal Navy. His son Charles Webley-Hope was also a rear-admiral in the Royal Navy. The latter was the father of 1) Sir George Price Webley Hope, an admiral in the Royal Navy, who was the father of Maurice Webley Hope (1901–1986), a brigadier in the army, and 2) Herbert Willes Webley Hope (1878–1968), an admiral in the Royal Navy, whose son Adrian Price Webley Hope was a major-general in the army.

Charles Hope, son of Charles Hope (1798–1854), was a captain in the Royal Navy. His son Frederick Hope was a major-general in the army. The latter's grandson Sir Peter Hope was a diplomat and served as Ambassador to Mexico from 1968 to 1972. He was also President of the British Association of the Sovereign Military Order of Malta. Sir John Hope (1765–1836) (second son of John Hope, second son of the Hon. Charles Hope-Weir) was a lieutenant-general in the army. His third son, Sir William Hope-Johnstone (1766–1831) was a vice-admiral in the Royal Navy. He married his second cousin Lady Anne Hope-Johnston, de jure 6th Countess of Annandale and Hartfell, daughter of the third Earl. Their eldest son John James Hope Johnstone (1796–1876) twice unsuccessfully claimed the earldom of Annandale and Hartfell. However, his great-great-great-grandson successfully claimed the title in 1985 (see Earl of Annandale and Hartfell).

Sir William Hope-Johnstone and Lady Anna Hope-Johnstone were also the parents of:

1. Sir William James Hope-Johnstone (1798–1878), an admiral in the Royal Navy
2. Commander Charles Jame Hope-Johnstone (1801–1835), who was the father of James Charles Hope-Johnstone (1835–1884), a major-general in the army
3. George James Hope-Johnstone (1802–1842), a captain in the Royal Navy, whose son William George Hope-Johnstone (1830–1870) was also a captain in the Royal Navy

Sir George Johnstone Hope, son of Charles Hope-Weir by his third wife Helen Dunbar, was an admiral in the Royal Navy and fought at the Battle of Trafalgar. He married his first cousin once removed Lady Jemima Hope (d. 1808), daughter of the third Earl of Hopetoun. Their son Sir James Hope-Vere was an admiral of the fleet in the Royal Navy.

Charles Hope (1768–1828), eldest son of the second Earl from his third marriage to Lady Elizabeth Leslie, was a general in the army. The Hon. Sir Alexander Hope (1769–1837), fourth son of the second Earl (and second from his third marriage to Lady Elizabeth Leslie), was a general in the army and represented Linlithgowshire in the House of Commons. He was the father of 1) George William Hope of Luffness (1808–1863), Member of Parliament for Windsor from 1859 to 1863, whose son Sir Edward Stanley Hope (1846–1921) served as a Lunacy Commissioner, and 2) the Hon. James Hope-Scott, a prominent barrister, who was the father of James Hope, 1st Baron Rankeillour (see the Baron Rankeillour for more information on this branch of the family). The Hon. James Hope-Wallace, second son of the fourth Earl, was a lieutenant-colonel in the army and sat as a Member of Parliament. Charles Dunbar Hope-Dunbar, grandson of the Hon. Charles Hope, third son of the fourth Earl, proved his claim to the Dunbar Baronetcy of Baldoon (created in 1664) in 1916 and became the 6th Baronet (see Hope-Dunbar baronets). Lord John Hope, younger twin son of the second Marquess, was a prominent Conservative politician and was created Baron Glendevon in 1964.

== See also ==
- Earl of Linlithgow
- Baron Glendevon
- Baron Rankeillour
- Earl of Annandale and Hartfell
- Hope baronets
- Hope-Dunbar baronets
- dedication Earl's March 1889 written by Australian poet Walter J. Turner whilst Adrian Hope was Governor-General of Australia
