= Earl of Annandale and Hartfell =

Scottish peerage

Earldom of Annandale and Hartfell
- Argent a saltire Sable and on a chief Gules three cushions Or.
- Creation date: 1661
- Created by: Charles II
- Peerage: Peerage of Scotland
- First holder: James Johnstone, 1st
- Present holder: Patrick Hope-Johnstone, 11th Earl of Annandale and Hartfell
- Heir apparent: David Hope-Johnstone, Lord Johnstone
- Subsidiary titles: Lord Johnstone

Earl of Annandale and Hartfell is a title in the Peerage of Scotland, created in 1661 for James Johnstone.

In 1625, the title of Earl of Annandale had been created for John Murray, but it became extinct when his son James died without heirs.

James Johnstone, son of Sir James Johnstone, Warden of the West Marches, was created Lord Johnstone of Lochwood in 1633, and in 1643, was further created Earl of Hartfell. Johnstone's son, also James, resigned the earldom and received a regrant of the title, as Earl of Annandale and Hartfell, in 1661, and a further regrant of the same title, but by crown charter, in 1662 to his heirs male of the body, whom failing, his heirs female of the body. William, the second Earl of Annandale and Hartfell, was created Marquess of Annandale in 1701. At the death of the third marquess, no one could prove a claim to the peerages of either earldoms and therefore they became dormant.

The earldoms remained dormant until Patrick Hope-Johnstone's claim was approved by the House of Lords in 1985. The Committee for Privileges ruled that Charles II's 1662 charter of regrant of lands constituted the creation of a new title. The title therefore descended through the female line in the person of Lady Henrietta Johnstone (who married Charles the First Earl of Hopetoun) to Patrick Hope-Johnstone.

The current earl holds the subsidiary title of Lord Johnstone (1662), in the peerage of Scotland.

The family seat is Raehills House, near Lockerbie, Dumfriesshire.

== Earls of Annandale (1625) ==
with subsidiaries Viscount of Annand and Lord Murray of Lochmaben (both c. 1622) and Lord Murray of Tyninghame (1625)

- John Murray, 1st Earl of Annandale (d. 1640)
- James Murray, 2nd Earl of Annandale (d. 1658) extinct.

== Earls of Hartfell (1643) ==
with subsidiaries Lord Johnston of Lochwood (1633) and Lord Johnston of Lochwood, Moffatdale and Evandale (1643) extinct.

- James Johnstone, 1st Earl of Hartfell (1602–1653)
- James Johnstone, 2nd Earl of Hartfell (d. 1672)

== Earls of Annandale and Hartfell (1661 and 1662) ==
- James Johnstone, 1st Earl of Annandale and Hartfell (d. 1672)
- William Johnstone, 2nd Earl of Annandale and Hartfell (d. 1721) (created Marquess of Annandale 1701)

== Marquesses of Annandale (1701) ==
- William Johnstone, 1st Marquess of Annandale (d. 1721)
- James Johnstone, 2nd Marquess of Annandale (c. 1687–1730)
- George Vanden-Bempde, 3rd Marquess of Annandale (1720–1792) (marquessate and 1661 and 1662 earldoms dormant 1792)

== Earls of Annandale and Hartfell (1662) ==
Subsidiary title: Lord Johnstone (1662)

- James Hope-Johnstone, 3rd Earl of Hopetoun (1741–1816), de jure 5th Earl of Annandale and Hartfell
- Anne Hope-Johnstone (1768–1818) de jure 6th Countess of Annandale and Hartfell
- John James Hope-Johnstone (1796–1876) de jure 7th Earl of Annandale and Hartfell
- John James Hope-Johnstone (1842–1912) de jure 8th Earl of Annandale and Hartfell
- Evelyn Wentworth Hope-Johnstone (1879–1964) de jure 9th Earl of Annandale and Hartfell
- Percy Wentworth Hope-Johnstone (1909–1983) de jure 10th Earl of Annandale and Hartfell
- Patrick Andrew Wentworth Hope-Johnstone, 11th Earl of Annandale and Hartfell (b. 1941) (revived 1985)

The heir apparent is the present holder's son David Patrick Wentworth Hope-Johnstone, Lord Johnstone (b. 1971)
The heir apparent's heir apparent is his son Percy John Wentworth Hope-Johnstone, Master of Johnstone (b. 2002)

== Family tree ==
Family tree of the Marquesses of Annandale, Marquess of Linlithgow, Earls of Annandale and Hartfell, Earls of Hopetoun, and subsidiary titles

Viscount of Annand and Lord Murray of Lochmaben, c. 1622; Earl of Annandale and Lord Murray of Tyninghame, 1625
John Murray d. 1640; 1st Earl of Annandale, etc.
Lord Johnston of Lochwood, 1633; Earl of Hartfell and Lord Johnston of Lochwood, Moffatdale and Evandale, 1643
Thomas Hope; 1573–1646; 1st Baronet of Craighall	James Murray d. 1658; 2nd Earl of Annandale, etc., 3rd Viscount Stormont	James Johnstone; 1602–1653; 1st Earl of Hartfell, etc.
Earldom of Annandale extinct, 1658
Resigned earldom of Hartfell and all subsidiary titles, 1661; Twice regranted as Earl of Annandale and Hartfell, 1661 and 1662; Lord Johnstone, 1662
James Hope; 1641–1661	James Johnstone d. 1672; 2nd Earl of Hartfell, etc., 1st Earl of Annandale and Hartfell, etc.
Marquess of Annandale, 1701
John Hope d. 1682	William Johnstone d. 1721; 1st Marquess of Annandale, 2nd Earl of Annandale and Hartfell, etc.
Earl of Hopetoun, Viscount Aithrie, and Lord Hope, 1703
Charles Hope; 1681–1742; 1st Earl of Hopetoun, etc.	Henrietta Johnstone; 1682–1750	James Johnstone c. 1687–1730; 2nd Marquess of Annandale, 3rd Earl of Annandale and Hartfell, etc.	George Vanden-Bempde; 1720–1792; 3rd Marquess of Annandale, 4th Earl of Annandale and Hartfell, etc.
Marquessate of Annandale and Earl of Annandale and Hartfell extinct, 1792
Charles Hope-Weir; 1710–1791	John Hope; 1704–1781; 2nd Earl of Hopetoun, etc.
Baron Hopetoun, 1809; Earl of Annandale and Hartfell claimed but not recognized
John Hope; 1739–1785	James Hope-Johnstone; 1741–1816; 3nd Earl of Hopetoun, etc., 1st Baron Hopetoun, de jure 5th Earl of Annandale and Hartfell, etc.
Baron Niddry, 1816
William Johnstone Hope; 1766–1831	Anne Hope-Johnstone; 1768–1818 de jure 6th Countess of Annandale and Hartfell, etc.	John Hope; 1765–1823; 4th Earl of Hopetoun, etc., 2nd Baron Hopetoun, 1st Baron Niddry	Alexander Hope; 1769–1837
John James Hope-Johnstone; 1796–1876 de jure 7th Earl of Annandale and Hartfell, etc.	John Hope; 1803–1843; 5th Earl of Hopetoun, etc., 3rd Baron Hopetoun, 2nd Baron Niddry	James Hope-Scott; 1812–1873
William James Hope Johnstone; 1819–1850	John Alexander Hope; 1831–1873; 6th Earl of Hopetoun, etc., 4th Baron Hopetoun, 3rd Baron Niddry
Marquess of Linlithgow, 1902	Baron Rankeillour, 1932
John James Hope-Johnstone; 1842–1912 de jure 8th Earl of Annandale and Hartfell, etc.	Percy Alexander Hope Johnstone; 1845–1899	John Adrian Louis Hope; 1860–1908; 1st Marquess of Linlithgow, 7th Earl of Hopetoun, etc., 5th Baron Hopetoun, 4th Baron Niddry	James Fitzalan Hope; 1870–1949; 1st Baron Rankeillour
Evelyn Wentworth Hope-Johnstone; 1879–1964 de jure 9th Earl of Annandale and Hartfell, etc.	Victor Alexander John Hope; 1887–1952; 2nd Marquess of Linlithgow, 8th Earl of Hopetoun, etc., 6th Baron Hopetoun, 5th Baron Niddry	Arthur Oswald James Hope; 1897–1958; 2nd Baron Rankeillour	Henry John Hope; 1899–1967; 3rd Baron Rankeillour	Richard Frederick Hope; 1901–1964
Baron Glendevon, 1964
Percy Wentworth Hope-Johnstone; 1909–1983 de jure 10th Earl of Annandale and Hartfell, etc.	Charles William Frederick Hope; 1912–1987; 3rd Marquess of Linlithgow, 9th Earl of Hopetoun, etc., 7th Baron Hopetoun, 6th Baron Niddry	John Adrian Louis Hope; 1912–1996; 1st Baron Glendevon
Earl of Annandale and Hartfell and Lord Johnstone revived, 1985
Patrick Andrew Wentworth Hope-Johnstone b. 1941; 11th Earl of Annandale and Hartfell, etc.	Charles William Frederick Hope b. 1946; 4th Marquess of Linlithgow, 10th Earl of Hopetoun, etc., 8th Baron Hopetoun, 7th Baron Niddry	Julian John Somerset Hope; 1950–2009; 2nd Baron Glendevon	Peter St Thomas More Henry Hope; 1935–2005; 4th Baron Rankeillour	Michael Richard Hope; 1940–2022; 5th Baron Rankeillour
David Patrick Wentworth Hope-Johnstone b. 1971 styled Lord Johnstone; Heir apparent to the Earl of Annandale and Hartfell	Andrew Victor Arthur Charles Hope b. 1969 styled Earl of Hopetoun; Heir apparent to the Marquess of Linlithgow	Jonathan Charles Hope b. 1952; 3rd Baron Glendevon	James Francis Hope b. 1968; 6th Baron Rankeillour

== See also ==
- Clan Johnstone
