= Hope-Johnstone =

Hope-Johnstone is a surname. Notable people with the surname include:

- James Hope-Johnstone, 3rd Earl of Hopetoun (1741–1816), Scottish peer
- John Hope-Johnstone (disambiguation), multiple people
- Patrick Hope-Johnstone, 11th Earl of Annandale and Hartfell (born 1941), Scottish peer
- Percy Wentworth Hope-Johnstone (1909–1983), de jure British peer and army soldier
- William Hope-Johnstone (1798–1878), British navy commander

== See also ==
- Hope (surname)
- Johnstone (surname)
