= Clan Johnstone =

Border clan

Clan Johnston(e)
- Mac Iain, MacIain, Mac Eoin (Irish Gaelic)
- Motto: Nunquam Non Paratus ("Never Unprepared").

Profile
- Plant badge: Red Hawthorn.

Chief
- Patrick Hope-Johnstone, 11th Earl of Annandale and Hartfell
- The 11th Earl of Annandale and Hartfell, Lord Johnstone, 26th Chief of the Name and Arms of Johnstone, 11th Hereditary Steward of Annandale and 11th Hereditary Keeper of Lochmaben Palace.
- Seat: Mansion of Raehills, Lockerbie.
- Historic seat: Lochwood Tower
Clan branches
Johnstones of Annandale (chiefs)
Johnstons of Caskieben (senior cadets).
Rival clans
Clan Douglas
Clan Moffat
Clan Maxwell

Clan Johnstone is a Border Reiver Scottish clan.

== History ==
=== Origins of the clan ===
The Clan Johnstone were once one of the most powerful of the Border Reiver Scottish clans. They originally settled in Annandale and for more than six hundred years they held extensive possessions in the west of the Scottish Marches, where they kept watch against the English.

The first of the clan to be recorded was Jon, whose son, Gilbert de Jonistune, is found in records after 1194. A descendant, named Johan de Joneſton, was a knight of the county of Dumfries. He is found on the Ragman Rolls of 1296, swearing fealty to Edward I of England. In 1388 his great-grandson, Sir John Johnston, Laird of Johnston, was appointed Warden of the Western Marches.

The Johnstones are believed to be of Norman and Anglo-Saxon descent. The great grandfather of John Johnston(e) was Siward, Earl of Northumbria who was a Norse man who married Ælfflæd (Bernicia) of Northumbria.

=== 15th century and clan conflicts ===
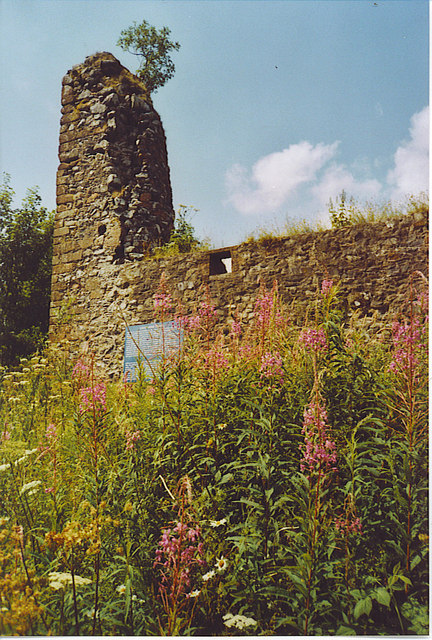
Lochwood Tower (Lochwood Castle) in Annandale, historic seat of the chief of Clan Johnstone.

The Warden's son was Adam Johnstone who was the first Laird of Johnstone. Adam Johnstone fought at the Battle of Sark in 1448. Adam's son fought for James II of Scotland in the desperate struggle against the Clan Douglas and was instrumental in suppressing that rebellion against the Crown. The king rewarded him with the lands of Buittle and Sannoch near Threave Castle that had previously belonged to the Douglases of Galloway.

=== 16th century and clan conflicts ===
The Johnstones had a long feud with the Clan Moffat who were another Scottish border clan. In 1557 the feud climaxed with murder of the Moffat chief, Robert Moffat. The Johnstones then went on to burn the local church with the most important members of the Moffat family inside, slaughtering anyone who tried to escape. The Clan Moffat was almost wiped out and seventy years later all of the Moffat's lands were passed to the Johnstones due to the Moffats having massive debts.

Unlike many of their neighbours who raided each other's lands, the Johnstones only raided England. However they did have a feud with the Clan Maxwell in 1593 when Lord Maxwell was killed along with many of his men at the Battle of Dryfe Sands. Later in 1608, in a meeting to reconcile their differences, Lord Maxwell treacherously killed Johnstone. Maxwell was later captured and executed by hanging.

=== 17th century and Civil War ===
In 1633, Charles I of England created James Johnstone, chief of Clan Johnstone as Lord Johnstone of Lochwood. Ten years later he was created Earl of Hartfell. He joined James Graham, 1st Marquis of Montrose after the Battle of Kilsyth in 1645 but was captured at the Battle of Philiphaugh. His son, James, was imprisoned for some time in Dumbarton Castle, Glasgow Castle, St Andrews Castle and Edinburgh Castle. However Charles II of England later created him Earl of Annandale and Hartfell.

Another branch of the Clan Johnstone were the Johnstones of Caskieben. Sir George Johnstone of Caskieben was created a Baronet of Nova Scotia in 1626. The third baronet fought for William of Orange at the Battle of the Boyne in 1690.

=== 18th century ===
William Johnstone, third Earl of Hartfell and second Earl of Annandale and Hartfell, was raised to the rank of Marquess of Annandale in 1701. William Johnstone held many important state offices including President of the Privy Council and Secretary of State.

James Johnstone, 2nd Marquess of Annandale, died in Naples in 1730. He had enjoyed the family estate and dignities for only nine years. He was succeeded by George, 3rd Marquess of Annandale, who was found in 1747 to be incapable of managing his affairs and a curator was appointed. Upon his death in 1792 the family titles became dormant and the estates fell upon his grand-nephew, James Hope-Johnstone, 3rd Earl of Hopetoun.

== Clan chief ==
- Clan chief: The 11th Earl of Annandale and Hartfell, Lord Johnstone, 26th Chief of the Name and Arms of Johnstone, 11th Hereditary Steward of Annandale and 11th Hereditary Keeper of Lochmaben Palace.

Several unsuccessful attempts were made in the 19th century to revive the Annandale titles and it was not until 1971 that any progress was made, based on a charter of 1662. The Annandale Johnstones were confirmed as chiefs of Clan Johnstone and in 1982 the Lord Lyon King of Arms recognised Major Percy Johnstone of Annandale as baron of the earldom of Annandale and Hartfell and of the lordship of Johnstone, Hereditary Stewart of the Stewartry of Annandale, and Hereditary Keeper of Lochmaben Castle. Then in 1985 a case was presented to the House of Lords in which the Court found in favour of Major Percy Johnstone's son, Patrick, as chief of the name and arms of Johnstone.

== Tartan ==
Tartan Image	Notes
Johnston(e) Tartan	Johnston(e) tartan, as published in 1842, in the dubious Vestiarium Scoticum, Modern thread count: Bk4 B4 Bk4 B48 G60 Bk2 G4 Y6.

== See also ==
- Annandale, Dumfries and Galloway
- Earl of Annandale and Hartfell
- Scottish clan
