= Peter Hope =

Peter Hope may refer to:

- Peter Hope (composer) (born 1930), British composer and arranger
- Sir Peter Hope (diplomat) (1912–1999), British intelligence officer and diplomat
- Peter Hope, 4th Baron Rankeillour (1935–2005), Scottish landowner, farmer, and member of the House of Lords
