= Lord Lieutenant of West Lothian =

Ceremonial officer in West Lothian, Scotland

This is a list of people who have served as Lord Lieutenant of West Lothian. The office was known as the Lord Lieutenant of Linlithgowshire until 1921.

- James Hope-Johnstone, 3rd Earl of Hopetoun 17 March 1794 – 29 May 1816
- John Hope, 4th Earl of Hopetoun 25 June 1816 – 27 August 1823
- vacant
- John Hope, 5th Earl of Hopetoun 23 November 1824 – 8 April 1843
- Archibald Primrose, 4th Earl of Rosebery 20 April 1843 – 1863
- John Alexander Hope, 6th Earl of Hopetoun 1 October 1863 – 2 April 1873
- Archibald Primrose, 5th Earl of Rosebery 5 June 1873 – 21 May 1929
- Victor Hope, 2nd Marquess of Linlithgow 8 October 1929 – 5 January 1952
- Henry Moubray Cadell 28 May 1952 – 1964
- Charles Hope, 3rd Marquess of Linlithgow 14 October 1964 – 1985
- John Douglas, 21st Earl of Morton 27 June 1985 – 2002
- Isobel Gunning Brydie 11 June 2002 – 20 Sep 2017
- Moira Niven 20 Sep 2017–
