= John Hope, 2nd Earl of Hopetoun =

Scottish aristocrat (1704–1781)

The Right Honourable The Earl of Hopetoun
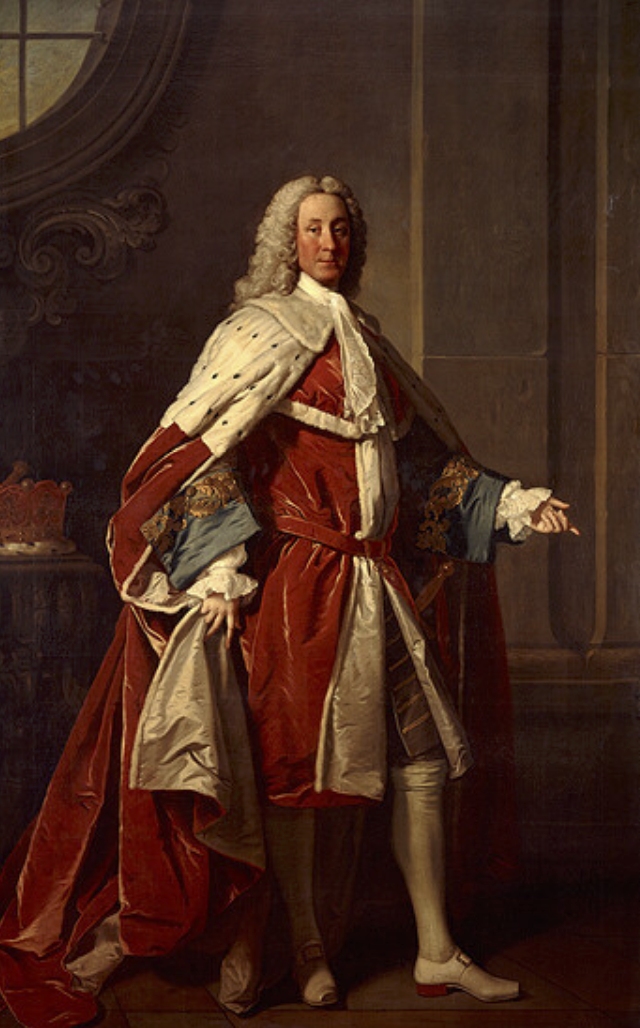
- Portrait of Lord Hopetoun, by Allan Ramsay
- Born: John Hope; 7 September 1704
- Died: 12 February 1781 (aged 76)
- Spouse(s): Lady Anne Ogilvy (m. 1733; died 1759) Jane Oliphant (m. 1762; died 1767) Lady Elizabeth Leslie (m. 1767; died 1781)
- Children: 13
- Parent(s): Charles Hope, 1st Earl of Hopetoun; Lady Henrietta Johnstone
- Relatives: William Johnstone, 1st Marquess of Annandale (grandfather)

John Hope, 2nd Earl of Hopetoun (7 September 1704 – 12 February 1781) was a Scottish aristocrat.

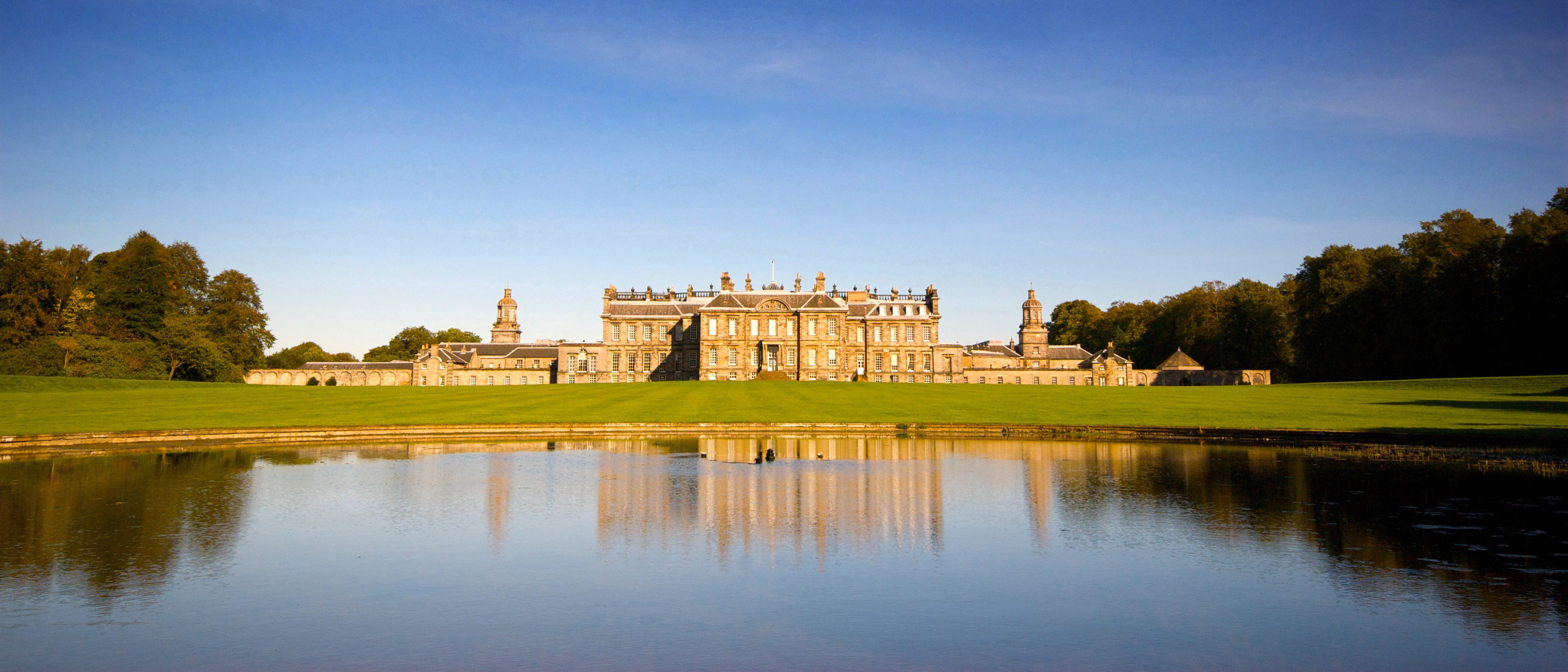
Hopetoun House, seat of Earls of Hopetoun

== Early life ==
Hope was born on 7 September 1704. He was the son of Charles Hope, 1st Earl of Hopetoun and Lady Henrietta Johnstone. Among his siblings were Lady Sophia Hope (wife of James Ogilvy, 5th Earl of Findlater), Lady Henrietta Hope (wife of Francis Napier, 6th Lord Napier), Lady Margaret Hope (wife of John Dundas), Hon. Charles Hope-Weir (who married Catherine Weir and Lady Anne Vane, a daughter of the 1st Earl of Darlington, and Helen Dunbar), Lady Helen Hope (wife of James Watson), Lady Christian Hope (wife of Thomas Graham of Balgowan), and Lady Charlotte Hope (wife of Thomas Erskine, Lord Erskine, eldest son and heir apparent of the 6th Earl of Mar).

His paternal grandparents were the former Lady Margaret Hamilton (a daughter of the 4th Earl of Haddington) and John Hope of Hopetoun, who purchased the barony of Niddry from George Seton, 4th Earl of Winton and the neighbouring barony of Abercorn, with the office of heritable sheriff of the County of Linlithgow. His maternal grandparents were William Johnstone, 1st Marquess of Annandale and the former Sophia Fairholm (a daughter of John Fairholm of Craigiehall).

== Career ==
Upon the death of his father on 26 February 1742, he succeeded to the title of 2nd Earl of Hopetoun.

In 1747 he was appointed Curator bonis (trustee in Lunacy) for his half-uncle, the 4th Earl of Annandale and Hartfell.

== Personal life ==
Lord Hopetoun was married three times throughout his life. His first marriage was on 14 September 1733 to Lady Anne Ogilvy, daughter of James Ogilvy, 5th Earl of Findlater (son of the 4th Earl of Findlater) and Lady Elizabeth Hay. Before her death, they were the parents of:

- Elizabeth Hope (1739–1756)
- James Hope-Johnstone, 3rd Earl of Hopetoun (1741–1817), who married Lady Elizabeth Carnegie, daughter of George Carnegie, 6th Earl of Northesk, in 1766.
- Lady Henrietta Hope (c. 1750–1786).
- Sophia Hope (1759–1813)

He married, secondly, Jane Oliphant (d. 1767) on 30 October 1762. She was a daughter of Robert Oliphant and sister to Robert Oliphant, a Postmaster General for Scotland, and Katherine Oliphant (wife of Colin Drummond). Before her death on 16 March 1767, they were the parents of:

- Lady Anne Hope (1763–1780)
- Jane Hope (d. 1829), who married Henry Dundas, 1st Viscount Melville, then after his death she married secondly to Thomas Wallace, 1st Baron Wallace.
- Gen. John Hope, 4th Earl of Hopetoun (1765–1823), who married his first cousin Elizabeth Hope-Vere, daughter of Hon. Charles Hope-Weir, in 1798. After her death he married Louisa Dorothea Wedderburn, daughter of John Wedderburn of Ballendean, and granddaughter of Sir John Wedderburn, 5th Baronet of Blackness.
- Jean Hope

His third marriage was to Lady Elizabeth "Betty" Leslie, (d. 1788) on 10 June 1767. She was a daughter of Alexander Melville, 5th Earl of Leven and Elizabeth Monypenny and the sister of David Leslie, 6th Earl of Leven. Together, they were the parents of:

- Gen. Hon. Charles Hope (1768–1828), who married Lady Louisa Anne Finch-Hatton.
- Gen. Hon. Sir Alexander Hope (1769–1837), who married Georgiana Brown in 1805.
- Lady Margaret Hope (1772-1831), who married Alexander Maclean, 13th Laird of Ardgour.
- Lady Charlotte Hope (1778–1834), who married her cousin, Charles Hope, Lord Granton.
- Lady Mary Anne Hope (d. 1838), who married Sir Patrick Murray of Ochtertyre, 6th Baronet, brother of Sir George Murray.

Lord Hopetoun died on 12 February 1781 and was succeeded in his titles by his son, James Hope-Johnstone. His third wife died on 10 April 1788.

Peerage of Scotland
Preceded by Charles Hope	Earl of Hopetoun; 1742–1781	Succeeded by James Hope-Johnstone
