= John Hope-Johnstone (1796–1876) =

Scottish Tory politician

The Right Honourable John Hope-Johnstone DL
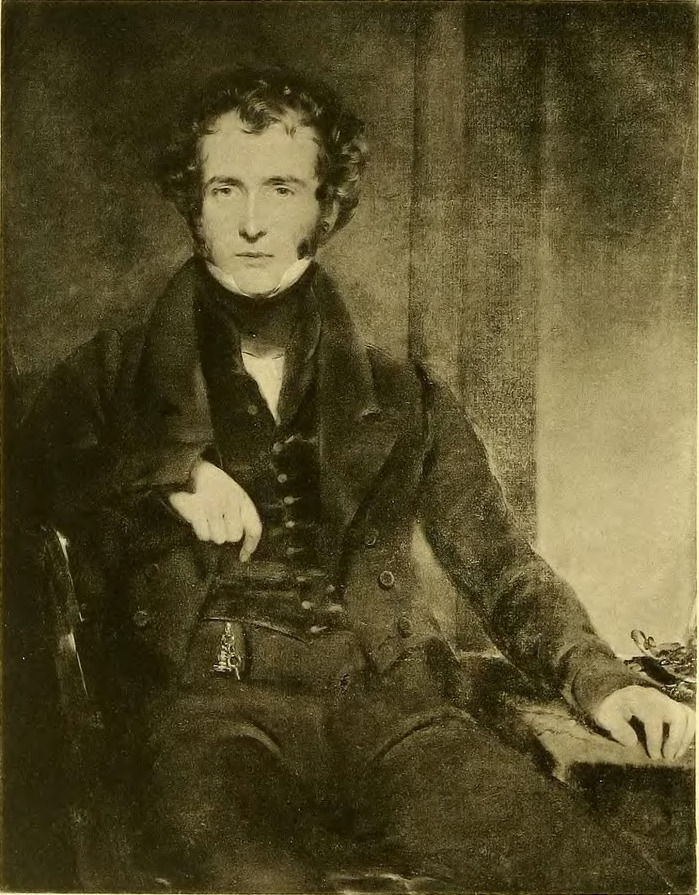

Member of the British Parliament for Dumfriesshire
- In office 1857–1865
- Preceded by: Viscount Drumlanrig
- Succeeded by: George Gustavus Walker
- In office 1830–1847
- Preceded by: William Johnstone Hope
- Succeeded by: Viscount Drumlanrig

Personal details
- Born: John James Johnstone; 29 November 1796
- Died: 11 July 1876 (aged 79)
- Political party: Tory
- Spouse: Alicia Anne Gordon (m. 1816)
- Children: 11
- Parents: William Johnstone Hope (father); Lady Anne Hope Johnstone (mother)
- Occupation: Politician

John James Hope-Johnstone of Annandale DL (29 November 1796 – 11 July 1876) was a Scottish Tory politician.

== Early life ==
Hope-Johnstone was born on 29 November 1796. He was the eldest son of Vice-Admiral Sir William Johnstone Hope GCB, and Lady Anne Hope-Johnstone, the eldest daughter of James Hope-Johnstone, 3rd Earl of Hopetoun.

== Career ==
He was Keeper of Lochmaben Palace. Hope-Johnstone was the Member of Parliament (MP) for Dumfriesshire from 1830 until 1847 and again from 1857 to 1865.

He succeeded his father after the latter's retirement, reportedly at the urging of the newly crowned king William IV. While in Parliament, he supported several reform bills and introduced a petition from Church of Scotland ministers supporting daily Bible classes for Protestant children in Ireland.

He was appointed a Deputy Lieutenant of Dumfriesshire in 1874. He was de jure 7th Earl of Annandale and Hartfell. He on several occasions sought to obtain a peerage, but was ultimately unsuccessful.

== Personal life ==
On 8 July 1816 he married Alicia Anne Gordon, eldest daughter of George Gordon, Esq. He lived at Raehills in Lockerbie (where he considerably extended the house but faced "estate debts"), and Hook House, Dumfriesshire. Together, they had at least eleven children, including:

- William James Hope Johnstone (1819–1850), who married Hon. Octavia Sophia Bosville Macdonald, daughter of Lt.-Gen. Godfrey Macdonald, 3rd Baron Macdonald and Louisa Maria la Coast (an illegitimate daughter of Prince William Henry, Duke of Gloucester and Edinburgh), in 1841.
- George Gordon Hope Johnstone (1820–1866), a Captain who married Adelaide Mary Wentworth Sinclair, daughter of Sir George Sinclair, 2nd Baronet, in 1845.
- Robert Gordon Hope Johnstone (1829–1890), who married Agnes Swanson, daughter of Col. John Swanson, in 1855.
- Charles Hope Johnstone (1830–1855), a Lieutenant in the Royal Navy.
- Alice Hope Johnstone (d. 1890), who married Sir Graham Graham-Montgomery, 3rd Baronet, a son of Sir James Montgomery, 2nd Baronet, in 1845.
- David Baird Hope Johnstone (d. 1886), a Captain in the 92nd Highlanders who married Margaret Elizabeth Grierson, daughter of Lt.-Col. William Grierson, in 1860. After they divorced, he married Eliza Archer, daughter of T. Archer, in 1874.

The cause of his death in 1876 was given as "general decay". As his eldest son William predeceased him, the claim to the earldom of Annandale and Hartfell passed to his grandson, John Hope Johnstone (1842–1912).

Parliament of the United Kingdom
Preceded by William Johnstone Hope	Member of Parliament for Dumfriesshire; 1830 – 1847	Succeeded by Viscount Drumlanrig
Preceded by Viscount Drumlanrig	Member of Parliament for Dumfriesshire; 1857 – 1865	Succeeded by George Gustavus Walker
Peerage of Scotland
Preceded by Anne Hope Johnstone	de jure Earl of Annandale and Hartfell; 1818–1876	Succeeded by John Hope Johnstone
