= Henry Hope, 3rd Baron Rankeillour =

Scottish landowner, soldier and barrister

Henry John Hope, 3rd Baron Rankeillour (20 January 1899 – 2 December 1967) was a Scottish landowner, soldier, barrister, and member of the House of Lords.

== Life ==
The younger son of James Hope, 1st Baron Rankeillour (1870–1949), and a direct descendant of Sir Thomas Hope, 1st Baronet (1573–1646) and Charles Hope, 1st Earl of Hopetoun (1681–1742), Hope was educated at the Royal Military College, Sandhurst, and commissioned into the Scots Guards. He saw active service during the First World War, after which he trained as a barrister, and in 1925 was called to the bar from the Middle Temple.

On 19 December 1933, Hope married Mary Sibyl Ricardo, a daughter of Colonel Wilfred Ricardo DSO of Hook Hall, Surrey. They had a son, Peter St Thomas More Henry Hope (1935–2005), who succeeded him as the fourth baron, and a daughter, Anne Mary Elizabeth (born 1936).

In the war of 1939-45, Hope returned to his regiment and rose to the rank of Colonel. A Roman Catholic, he was appointed as a Knight of Malta.

In 1958, Hope succeeded his elder brother as Baron Rankeillour and inherited an estate based at Achaderry House, Roy Bridge, Inverness-shire. In the Lords, he chose to sit as a Conservative.

Rankeillour died in 1967 and was succeeded by his only son.

== Notes ==
Peerage of the United Kingdom
Preceded by Arthur Hope	Baron Rankeillour; 1958–1967	Succeeded by Peter St Thomas More Henry Hope
