= Peter Hope (diplomat) =

British intelligence officer and diplomat

Sir Peter Hope KCMG TD (29 May 1912 – 12 March 1999) was a British intelligence officer, later a diplomat, ambassador to Mexico.

== Life ==
Born Charles Peter Hope, he went by his middle name of Peter. He was the son of George Leonard Nelson Hope and Honoria Mary Victoria Riddell. Hope was educated at The Oratory School and Imperial College, London. While there he had an affair with Mary Farmar, later the novelist Mary Wesley.

In 1936 Hope married Hazel Mary Turner, the daughter of G. L. Turner, and had three sons.

== Career ==
In 1938 he joined the Territorial Army where he was recruited by the Secret Intelligence Service (SIS) to work in Germany. He joined the Royal Artillery in 1939, but was attached to MI6 and was involved with the formation of the Special Operations Executive. In 1941 he transferred to MI5 and was posted to SHAEF in 1944 to track down British traitors, one of whom was Harold Cole who Hope arrested in 1945. In 1946 Hope transferred to the Foreign Office. He was Minister at Madrid 1959–62, Consul-General at Houston 1963–64, Minister and Alternate UK Representative to the United Nations 1965–68 and Ambassador to Mexico 1968–72. In retirement, he devoted his time to the affairs of the Order of Malta.

Hope was appointed CMG in the New Year Honours of 1957 and knighted KCMG in the Queen's Birthday Honours of 1972. He was a Knight of the Venerable Order of St John, a Knight Grand Cross of the Order of the Aztec Eagle (Mexico), a Grand Officer of the Order of Malta and a member of the Order of Saints George and Constantine (Greece).

== Sources ==
- HOPE, Sir (Charles) Peter, Who Was Who, A & C Black, 1920–2007; online edn, Oxford University Press, December 2012
- Sir Peter Hope obituary, p. 21, The Times (London), 16 March 1999

Diplomatic posts
Preceded by Sir Nicolas Cheetham	Ambassador Extraordinary and Plenipotentiary at Mexico City; 1968–1972	Succeeded by Sir John Galsworthy
