= Peter Hope, 4th Baron Rankeillour =

Scottish landowner, farmer and member of the House of Lords

Peter St Thomas More Henry Hope, 4th Baron Rankeillour (29 May 1935 — 12 April 2005) was a Scottish landowner, farmer, and member of the House of Lords.

The son of Henry Hope, 3rd Baron Rankeillour (1899–1967), and a direct descendant of Sir Thomas Hope, 1st Baronet (1573–1646) and Charles Hope, 1st Earl of Hopetoun (1681–1742), he was educated at Ampleforth College and succeeded his father as Baron Rankeillour in 1967, also inheriting an estate based at Achaderry House, Roy Bridge, Inverness-shire. In the Lords, he chose to sit as a Conservative.

He was an inventor of agricultural and horticultural equipment and stated his recreations as country pursuits and large-scale landscaping. A keen yachtsman, in 1992 he was Rear Commodore of the House of Lords Yacht Club.

Rankeillour died a bachelor and was succeeded by a cousin, Michael Richard Hope (born 1940).

== Notes ==
Peerage of the United Kingdom
Preceded by Henry John Hope	Baron Rankeillour; 1967–2005	Succeeded by Michael Richard Hope
