= Julian Hope, 2nd Baron Glendevon =

British opera producer and aristocrat

Julian John Somerset Hope, 2nd Baron Glendevon (6 March 1950 – 29 September 2009) was a British opera producer and aristocrat. Hope was resident producer at the Welsh National Opera 1973-79 and associate producer at the Glyndebourne Festival Opera 1974–81. He was the grandson of the writer, Somerset Maugham.

== Early life and education ==
Julian Hope was born on 6 March 1950 the elder son of John Hope, 1st Baron Glendevon and his wife Mary Elizabeth Maugham. His mother was the only child of novelist W. Somerset Maugham and Syrie Barnardo Wellcome, herself the daughter of Barnardo's founder, and Hope's great-grandfather, Thomas John Barnardo.

Hope had one younger brother, Jonathan, and two older half-siblings through his mother's first marriage. Hope's godparents included British Prime Minister, Anthony Eden and American horticulturist, Bunny Mellon. Hope's nephew is the pianist, Derek Paravicini.

Hope was raised in Henley-on-Thames, Oxfordshire, and educated at Eton College and Christ Church, Oxford. After studying at Oxford, he trained at Glyndebourne before joining the Welsh National Opera.

== Career ==
Hope was resident producer at the Welsh National Opera from 1973 to 1979 and associate producer at the Glyndebourne Festival Opera from 1974 to 1981.

At Welsh National Opera, he directed Il Trovatore, Manon Lescaut. His productions included a revival of The Rocky Horror Show (1980) and Violet (2009). His work was also seen at the Wexford Festival, Edinburgh Festival, San Francisco Opera, Dallas Opera and Paris.

Hope administered his grandfather's estate and played a key role in bringing Somerset Maugham's works to the screen, contributing to films such as Up at the Villa and The Painted Veil and the TV series Ashenden. He also worked in film and television, supervising the musical scores for Princess Caraboo and Onegin.

== Barony ==
Hope succeeded to his father's title in 1996. He never married and, on his death in 2009, his title passed to his younger brother, Jonathan Hope, the 3rd Baron Glendevon.

== Bibliography ==
- Reports: Cardiff, The Musical Times, vol. 117, no. 1600 (June 1976) (Julian Hope's Welsh National Opera production of Il Trovatore)
- Reports: The Musical Times, vol. 116, no. 1590 (August 1975) (Julian Hope's production of Georg Philipp Telemann's opera Pimpinone at Caerphilly Castle)

Peerage of the United Kingdom
Preceded by John Hope	Baron Glendevon; 1996–2009	Succeeded by Jonathan Hope
