= John Hope, 1st Baron Glendevon =

British aristocrat and Tory politician

The Right Honourable The Lord Glendevon PC
- Portrait by Walter Bird in 1956

Minister of Works
- In office 22 October 1959 – 16 July 1962
- Prime Minister: Harold Macmillan
- Preceded by: Hugh Molson
- Succeeded by: Geoffrey Rippon

Joint Under-Secretary of State for Scotland
- In office 18 January 1957 – 22 October 1959
- Prime Minister: Harold Macmillan

Under-Secretary of State for Commonwealth Relations
- In office 9 November 1956 – 18 January 1957
- Prime Minister: Anthony Eden
- Preceded by: Allan Noble
- Succeeded by: Cuthbert Alport

Joint Parliamentary Under-Secretary of State for Foreign Affairs
- In office 18 October 1954 – 9 November 1956
- Prime Minister: Sir Winston Churchill; Anthony Eden

Member of Parliament for Edinburgh Pentlands Midlothian and Peebles Northern (1945–1950)
- In office 5 July 1945 – 15 October 1964
- Preceded by: Sir David King Murray
- Succeeded by: Norman Russell Wylie

Personal details
- Born: 7 April 1912
- Died: 18 January 1996 (aged 83)
- Party: Scottish Conservative Party
- Other political affiliations: Unionist Party (until 1965)
- Spouse: Elizabeth Paravicini (m. 1948)
- Relations: Charles Hope, 3rd Marquess of Linlithgow (twin brother)
- Children: Julian Hope, 2nd Baron Glendevon; Jonathan Hope, 3rd Baron Glendevon
- Parents: Victor Hope, 2nd Marquess of Linlithgow; Doreen Milner
- Education: Eton
- Alma mater: Christ Church, Oxford
- Occupation: Politician

Military service
- Allegiance: United Kingdom
- Branch/service: British Army
- Rank: Major
- Unit: Scots Guards
- Battles/wars: World War II

John Adrian Louis Hope, 1st Baron Glendevon, PC (7 April 1912 – 18 January 1996), known as Lord John Hope from 1912 to 1964, was a British aristocrat and Tory politician.

== Early life ==
Hope was the younger son of Victor Hope, 2nd Marquess of Linlithgow, and Doreen Maud Milner. His elder twin brother was Charles Hope, 3rd Marquess of Linlithgow. He was educated at Ludgrove, Eton and Christ Church, Oxford and served in the Second World War in Norway and Italy with the Scots Guards, achieving the rank of temporary Major. He was twice mentioned in despatches.

== Political career ==
In 1945 Hope was elected Member of Parliament for Midlothian and Peebles North, a seat he held until 1950, and then represented Edinburgh Pentlands from 1950 to 1964.

Hope served in the Conservative administrations of Winston Churchill, Anthony Eden and Harold Macmillan as Joint Parliamentary Under-Secretary of State for Foreign Affairs from 1954 to 1956, as Parliamentary Under-Secretary of State for Commonwealth Relations from 1956 to 1957 and as Joint Parliamentary Under-Secretary of State for Scotland from 1957 to 1959. In 1959 he was appointed Minister of Works and sworn a Privy Counsellor. Hope remained as head of the Ministry of Works until 1962. In 1964 he was raised to the peerage as Baron Glendevon, of Midhope in the County of Linlithgow.

== Personal life ==
Lord Glendevon married Elizabeth Paravicini (1915–1998), the former wife of Vincent Paravicini and the only child of the author W. Somerset Maugham, in 1948. They had two sons. Lord Glendevon died on 18 January 1996, aged 83, and was succeeded in the barony by his elder son, Julian.

Parliament of the United Kingdom
Preceded by Sir David King Murray	Member of Parliament for Midlothian & Peebles North; 1945–1950	Constituency abolished
New constituency	Member of Parliament for Edinburgh Pentlands; 1950–1964	Succeeded by Norman Wylie
Political offices
Preceded by Anthony Nutting; Douglas Dodds-Parker	Joint Parliamentary Under-Secretary of State for Foreign Affairs; 1954–1956; With: Robin Turton 1954–1955; Douglas Dodds-Parker 1955–1956	Succeeded by Douglas Dodds-Parker; David Ormsby-Gore
Preceded by Allan Noble	Under-Secretary of State for Commonwealth Relations; 1956–1957	Succeeded by Cuthbert Alport
Preceded by James Henderson Stewart; Jack Browne; Niall Macpherson	Joint Under-Secretary of State for Scotland; 1957–1959; With: Jack Browne 1957–1959; Niall Macpherson 1957–1959	Succeeded by Niall Macpherson; Tam Galbraith; Gilmour Leburn
Preceded by Hugh Molson	Minister of Works; 1959–1962	Succeeded by Geoffrey Rippon
Peerage of the United Kingdom
New creation	Baron Glendevon; 1964–1996	Succeeded by Julian Hope
