= Percy Wentworth Hope-Johnstone =

Percy Wentworth Hope-Johnstone (2 January 1909 – 5 April 1983) was a British Army officer, de jure 10th Earl of Annandale and Hartfell.

== Life ==
Hope-Johnstone was the son of Evelyn Wentworth Hope-Johnstone (9 March 1879 – 26 October 1964) and Eileen Briscoe (died 18 April 1909). He was educated at Sherborne School and the Royal Military College, Sandhurst, from where he was commissioned into the 16th/5th Lancers of the British Army, in which he became a Lieutenant. He later served with the 155th (Lanarkshire Yeomanry) Field Regiment, the Royal Artillery, in which he was promoted to the rank of Major. During the Malayan campaign of the Second World War, Hope-Johnstone was captured in the Far East and held as a prisoner of war of the Japanese.

On the death of his father, he succeeded him as Chief of Clan Johnstone, Hereditary Steward of Annandale, and Hereditary Keeper of Lochmaben Palace. He also succeeded his father as Lord Johnstone and to the dormant peerage of Earl of Annandale and Hartfell, but never claimed it.

== Motor racing ==
Using the nom de course W. P. Lockwood, Hope-Johnstone had a brief motor racing career, taking part in the 1931 RAC Tourist Trophy in Northern Ireland and the Le Mans 24 Hours in an Arrol-Aster, but the 2.3 litre car was unreliable and slow; Lockwood crashed into a chemist's shop in the former race, and in the latter, with team-mate Jack Bartlett at the wheel, the Arrol-Aster broke down on the Mulsanne Straight at 8am, all water in the radiator having boiled away.

== Personal life ==
On 7 July 1932, Hope-Johnstone married Phyllis Athena MacDonell. They had no children and divorced in 1939. On 26 July 1940 he married Margaret Jane Hunter-Arundell (8 November 1910 – 5 May 1998). They had two children:

- Patrick Andrew Wentworth, 11th Earl of Annandale and Hartfell (born 19 April 1941)
- Lady Eileen Elizabeth (born 3 October 1948)
