= John Hope, 4th Earl of Hopetoun =

British Army officer and politician

General The Right Honourable The Earl of Hopetoun GCB PC (Ire) FRSE
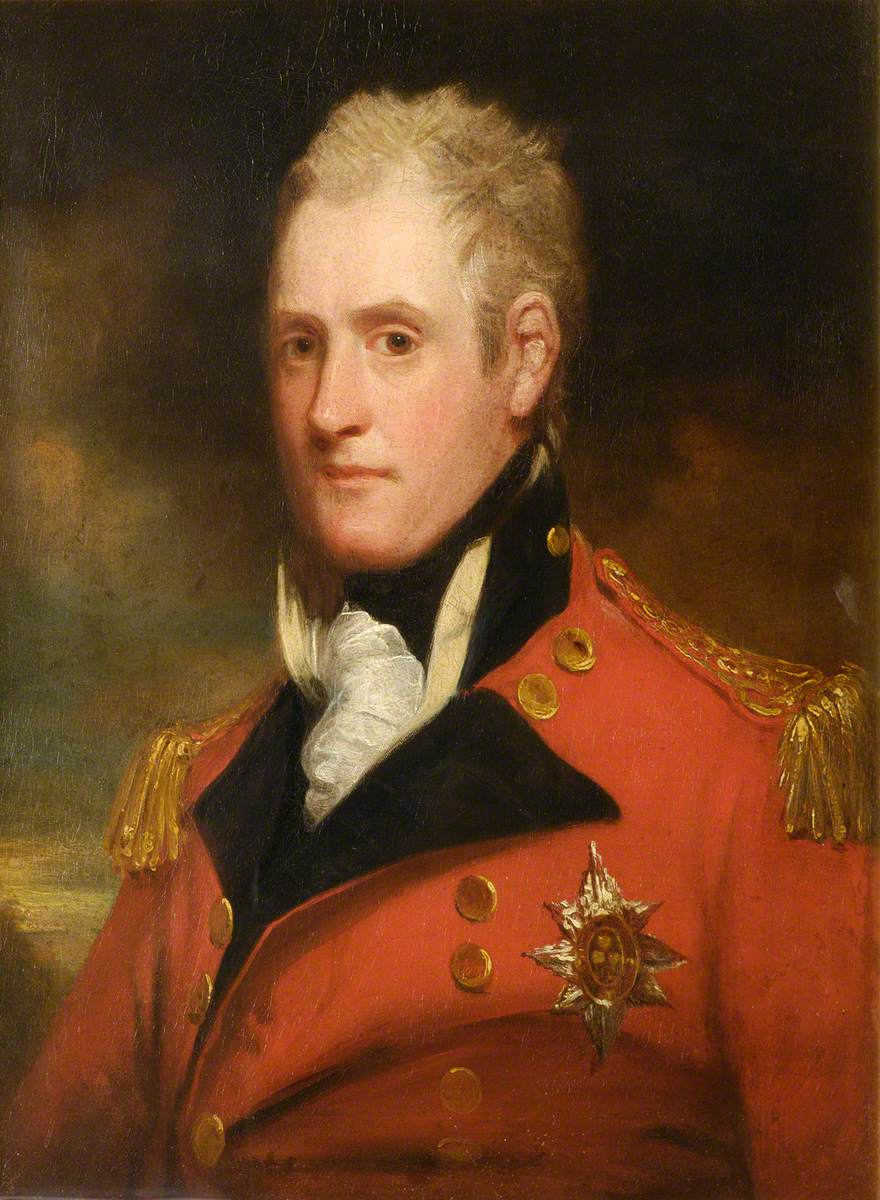
- Portrait by John Hoppner
- Born: 17 August 1765; Abercorn, West Lothian
- Died: 27 August 1823 (aged 58); Paris, France
- Burial place: Abercorn, West Lothian
- Military career
- Allegiance: Great Britain; United Kingdom
- Branch: British Army
- Rank: General
- Commands: Ireland
- Conflicts: French Revolutionary Wars; Napoleonic Wars; Peninsular War; Battle of Corunna; Walcheren Campaign; Battle of Nivelle; Battle of the Nive
- Awards: Knight of the Order of the Bath; Captain-General of the Royal Company of Archers

General John Hope, 4th Earl of Hopetoun, GCB, PC (Ire), FRSE (17 August 1765 – 27 August 1823), known as The Honourable John Hope from 1781 to 1814 and as Lord Niddry from 1814 to 1816, was a British Army officer and politician.

== Military career ==
Hopetoun was the only son of John Hope, 2nd Earl of Hopetoun, by his second wife Jane or Jean Oliphant. His mother died when he was only one year old. He was commissioned into the 10th Light Dragoons in 1784. He sat as Member of Parliament for Linlithgowshire from 1790 to 1800.

He took part in the capture of the French West Indies and Spanish West Indies in 1796 and 1797. In 1799 he was sent to Den Helder as Deputy Adjutant-General and was present at the Battle of Bergen and the Battle of Castricum. In 1801 he was sent to Cairo and then to Alexandria to take the surrender of the French garrisons there. He became Lieutenant-Governor of Portsmouth and General Officer Commanding South-West District in June 1805.

He commanded a division during the advance into Spain and commanded the British left at the Battle of Corunna in 1809, succeeding to overall command when Sir John Moore was killed. Later that year he commanded the reserve army during the Walcheren Campaign. He was appointed Commander-in-Chief, Ireland and was admitted to the Irish Privy Council in 1812. He then commanded the 1st Division under The Duke of Wellington at the Battle of Nivelle and at the Battle of the Nive in 1813. He was captured fighting the French sortie at the Battle of Bayonne in 1814.

He served as Lord-Lieutenant of Linlithgowshire from 1816 to 1823. On 17 May 1814, two years before he succeeded in the earldom, he was raised to the peerage in his own right as Baron Niddry, of Niddry Castle in the County of Linlithgow. In 1816 he succeeded his elder half-brother as fourth Earl of Hopetoun.

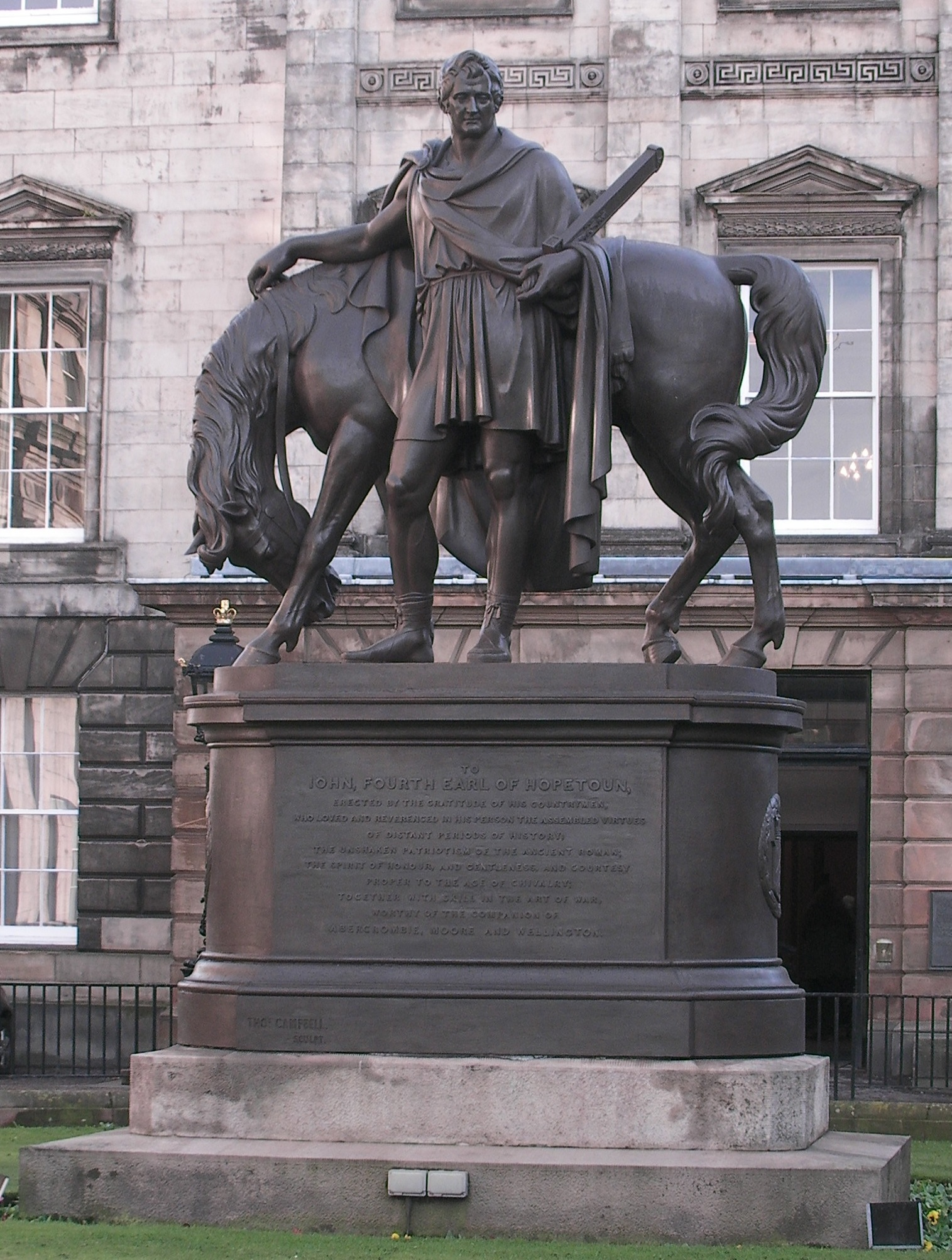
Statue of Hope in Edinburgh

He died in Paris, France on 27 August 1823.

== Family ==
In 1798 Lord Hopetoun married firstly Elizabeth Hope Vere (or Weir) of Craigiehall, daughter of Charles Hope-Weir. They had no children. After her death in 1801, he married secondly, in 1803, Louisa Dorothea Wedderburn, daughter of John Wedderburn of Ballendean, and granddaughter of Sir John Wedderburn, 5th Baronet of Blackness. By his second wife Hopetoun had ten sons; he was succeeded in his title by his eldest son, John. His seventh son was Louis Hope.

== Monuments ==
Following Lord Hopetoun's death, the Hopetoun Monument was erected on Byres Hill, East Lothian, in 1824. This was followed in 1826 by a similar monument on Mount Hill in Fife. In 1824 the city of Edinburgh commissioned a bronze statue of Lord Hopetoun, by Thomas Campbell, and originally designed as a centrepiece for Charlotte Square in 1829, but which was eventually placed in St Andrew Square in 1834, in front of Dundas House where he had acted as vice governor of the bank. The text on the latter is by Sir Walter Scott. In the wake of the George Floyd protests, a plaque was installed by its owners in June 2020 on the statue which reflected Lord Hopetoun's role in suppressing Fédon's rebellion, an uprising against British rule on the island of Grenada.

== Notes ==
Parliament of Great Britain
Preceded by Sir William Cunynghame, Bt	Member of Parliament for Linlithgowshire; 1790–1800	Succeeded by Sir Alexander Hope
Military offices
Preceded by Hildebrand Oakes	GOC South-West District; June 1805 – December 1805	Succeeded by Sir George Prevost
Preceded by Sir Robert Brownrigg	Colonel of the 6th Battalion, 60th Regiment of Foot; 1805–1806	Succeeded by Napier Christie Burton
Preceded by Marquess of Huntly	Colonel of the 92nd (Highland) Regiment of Foot; 1806–1820	Succeeded by Sir John Hope
Preceded by The Earl of Harrington	Commander-in-Chief, Ireland; 1812–1813	Succeeded by Sir George Hewett, Bt
Preceded by Marquess of Huntly	Colonel of the 42nd (Royal Highland) Regiment of Foot; 1820–1823	Succeeded by Sir George Murray
Honorary titles
Preceded by The 3rd Earl of Hopetoun	Lord-Lieutenant of Linlithgowshire; 1816–1823	Vacant Title next held by The 5th Earl of Hopetoun
Peerage of Scotland
Preceded by James Hope-Johnstone	Earl of Hopetoun; 1816–1823	Succeeded by John Hope
Peerage of the United Kingdom
New creation	Baron Niddry; 1814–1823	Succeeded by John Hope
