= John Hope-Johnstone (1842–1912) =

Scottish Conservative Party politician

John James Hope-Johnstone, 8th Earl of Annandale and Hartfell (5 October 1842 – 26 December 1912) was a Scottish Conservative Party politician.

At the 1874 general election Johnstone was elected as the Member of Parliament (MP) for Dumfriesshire. He did not stand again at the 1880 general election.

He was de jure 8th Earl of Annandale and Hartfell.

Parliament of the United Kingdom
Preceded by George Gustavus Walker	Member of Parliament for Dumfriesshire; 1874 – 1880	Succeeded by Sir Robert Jardine
Peerage of Scotland
Preceded by John Hope-Johnstone	de jure Earl of Annandale and Hartfell; 1876–1912	Succeeded by Evelyn Hope-Johnstone
