= William Johnstone Hope =

British Royal Navy admiral and politician

Vice-Admiral Sir William Johnstone Hope GCB
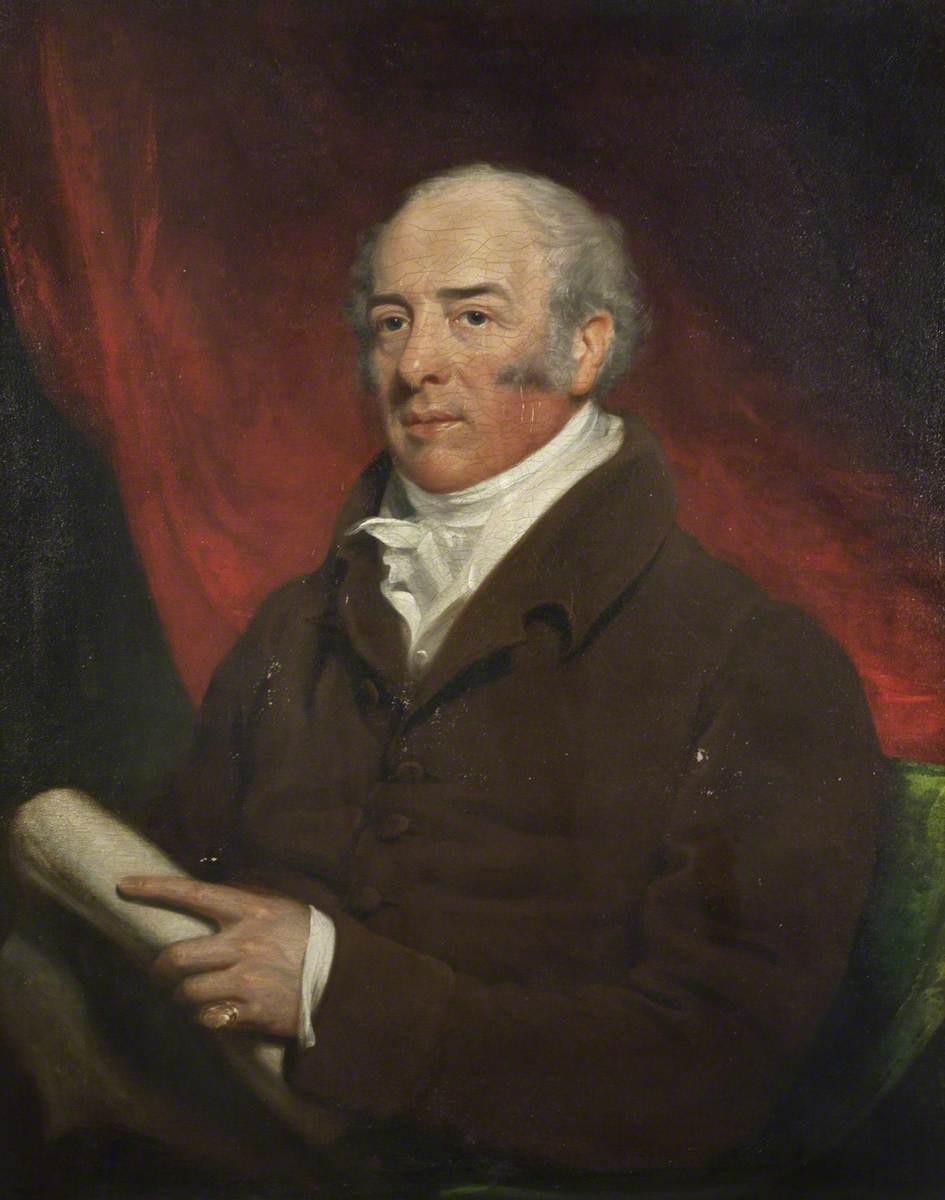
- Hope in 1824, by James Ramsay
- Born: 16 August 1766; Finchley, Middlesex
- Died: 2 May 1831 (aged 64); Bath, Somerset
- Military career
- Allegiance: United Kingdom
- Branch: Royal Navy
- Service years: 1777 to 1830
- Rank: Vice-Admiral
- Conflicts: American Revolutionary War; French Revolutionary Wars; Glorious First of June; Invasion of the Batavian Republic; Napoleonic Wars
- Awards: Commander of the Order of St John; Knight Grand Cross of the Order of the Bath
- Other work: Lord of the Admiralty; MP for Dumfries Burghs, 1800–1802; MP for Dumfriesshire, 1804–1830

Vice-Admiral Sir William Johnstone Hope, GCB (16 August 1766 – 2 May 1831) was a prominent and controversial British Royal Navy officer and politician in late eighteenth and early nineteenth century Britain, whose career experienced fleet actions, disputes with royalty, party politics and entry to both Russian and British orders of chivalry. A popular officer, Hope served with Nelson, Duncan and Lord Keith through several campaigns, making connections which enabled him to secure a lengthy political career after his retirement from the Royal Navy in 1804 due to ill-health. After 26 years in Parliament, Hope was largely inactive and instead served as a Lord of the Admiralty and commissioner of Greenwich Naval Hospital. Hope died in 1832 after 55 years of naval and political service and was buried in the family plot in Scotland.

== Early life ==
William Johnstone Hope was born the third son of John Hope and his wife Mary Breton. The Hopes were descendants of the first Earl of Hopetoun and maintained strong political links with the family; his brothers were also prominent figures, Charles Hope later became Lord Granton and Sir John Hope served as a brigadier under Wellington in the Peninsular War.

Hope was educated at Edinburgh High School between 1774 and 1776 and the following year, aged 12, he entered the Royal Navy as a midshipman in HMS Weazel, a sloop commanded by his uncle Captain Charles Hope. As his uncle's protégé, William traveled with his relative through various commands, serving during the American Revolutionary War off the Home, Lisbon and Newfoundland Stations. In 1782 he was promoted to lieutenant and left his uncle, taking a position on the frigate HMS Daedalus in Newfoundland. At the conclusion of the war, Hope returned home on Daedalus and remained on her until 1785 when his uncle returned him to his own ship, now the guardship HMS Sampson at Plymouth.

In 1786, Hope's career suffered a blow when he was stationed aboard the frigate HMS Pegasus, commanded by Prince William Henry. Hope and Prince William fell out badly and in less than a year Hope had been transferred to the frigate HMS Boreas, at that time commanded by Captain Horatio Nelson, with whom Hope had good relations. Two years later, Hope was transferred to HMS Adamant at the request of Sir Richard Hughes. When Hughes reached flag rank in 1790 whilst stationed in Newfoundland, he promoted Hope to commander and gave him command of Adamant.

=== French Revolutionary War ===
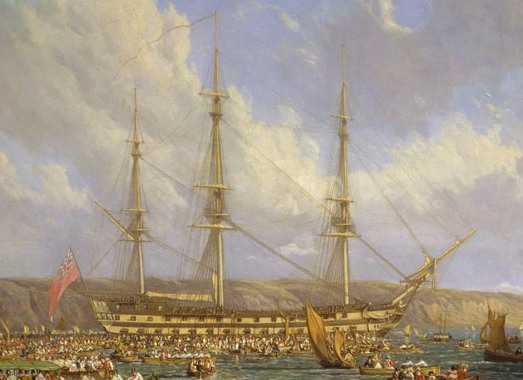
HMS Bellerophon, a ship commanded by William Johnstone Hope

Hope continued in command of small ships for several years, pausing in 1792 to marry his distant cousin, Lady Anne Hope Johnstone. The couple had two daughters and four sons before Anne's death in 1818. In 1794, Hope was in command of HMS Incendiary, a fireship of the Channel Fleet attached to Lord Howe's force sent to engage the French. In March, Hope was given his step to post captain, taking command of the ship of the line HMS Bellerophon, the flagship of Admiral Thomas Pasley.

Hope was still in command of the Bellerophon three months later when he was heavily engaged in the van of Howe's fleet at the Glorious First of June, when an equally sized French fleet was defeated 200 miles out in the Atlantic Ocean. At the start of 1795, Hope joined HMS Tremendous, but within two months was requested on board HMS Venerable by Admiral Duncan. However, while visiting aboard a Russian ship in 1796, Hope suffered a serious accidental head injury that left him an invalid for two years, consequently missing Duncan's victory at the Battle of Camperdown.

Returning from his long convalescence, Hope was again requested by Duncan and commanded his flagship HMS Kent for the next three years. In 1799, the Kent was Duncan's flagship in supporting the Anglo-Russian invasion of the Batavian Republic, with Hope being present at the surrender of the Dutch fleet in Texel to the Royal Navy. Sent to Britain with the dispatches proclaiming the surrender, Hope was lauded by both the British and Russian courts, King George III presenting him with £500 and Tsar Paul I making him a Commander of the Order of St John.

In 1801 in the Mediterranean, under the command of Admiral Lord Keith, Kent carried Sir Ralph Abercromby and his headquarters for the invasion of Egypt, a successful campaign which forced the surrender of the French occupying force. Hope was not present for the conclusion of the action, returning to Britain with Admiral Duncan after Sir Richard Bickerton raised his flag on Kent. He was awarded the Order of the Crescent by Emperor Selim III for this service. In 1800, Hope began his second career, gaining the seat of Dumfries Burghs in the House of Commons through family influence. During his time as MP, Hope rarely visited his constituency and equally rarely appeared in parliament. He lost the constituency to his brother in 1802, but in 1804 was elected to the seat of Dumfriesshire, again through family connections. He retained this post until his retirement from public life in 1830.

== Retirement ==
In 1804, at the end of the Peace of Amiens, Hope briefly took command of HMS Atlas, but it soon became clear that his health was failing and he could no longer maintain an active naval career. Retiring from the navy on half-pay, Hope was an invalid from 1804 until 1807, when a return to health permitted him to take a post as a Lord of the Admiralty. Hope changed positions several times in this role, but he held onto the position for twenty years as a political favourite, a status maintained by being almost totally politically inactive. In 1812, Hope was advanced to rear-admiral and in January 1815 he was appointed Knight Commander of the Order of the Bath (KCB) on the reorganisation of the order, and was invested later in the year.

From 1813, Hope served as commander-in-chief at Leith until 1818 and in 1819 he was again promoted, this time to vice-admiral. In March 1820 he was recalled to the Admiralty as First Naval Lord in the Liverpool ministry. He remained there for seven years without participating in any of the important decisions and innovations of the period. He remarried in 1821 to Maria, née Eden, widow of Frederik Willem van Reede, 6th Earl of Athlone, and daughter of Sir John Eden, 4th Baronet, and in 1825 was advanced to Knight Grand Cross of the Order of the Bath (GCB). In 1827, in the chaotic aftermath of the collapse of Lord Liverpool's government, Hope was retired in favour of Sir George Cockburn and given the favourable role of treasurer and later commissioner of the Royal Naval Hospital in Greenwich. Despite his conflicts with Prince William 45 years earlier, when King William IV ascended the throne in 1830, he made Hope a privy councillor, before Hope entered retirement later in the year. Hope died in May 1831, a few months after giving up his seat in Parliament. Although he died in Bath, his remains were returned to the family crypt at Johnstone Church, Johnstone, Dumfriesshire.

== Sources ==
- "Hope, Sir William Johnstone". Oxford Dictionary of National Biography, J. K. Laughton.
- Rodger, N.A.M. (1979). The Admiralty. Offices of State. Lavenham: T. Dalton Ltd. ISBN 0900963948.
- The services of the late Right Hon. Sir William Johnstone Hope, G.C.B. 1831.

Military offices
Preceded by Sir Graham Moore	First Naval Lord; 1820–1827	Succeeded by The Duke of Clarence and St Andrews (Lord High Admiral)
Parliament of Great Britain
Preceded by Alexander Hope	Member of Parliament for Dumfries Burghs; 1800–1801	Succeeded by Parliament of the United Kingdom
Parliament of the United Kingdom
Preceded by Parliament of Great Britain	Member of Parliament for Dumfries Burghs; 1801–1802	Succeeded by Lord Granton
Preceded by Sir Robert Laurie	Member of Parliament for Dumfriesshire; 1804–1830	Succeeded by John Hope-Johnstone
