= William Johnstone, 1st Marquess of Annandale =

Scottish nobleman

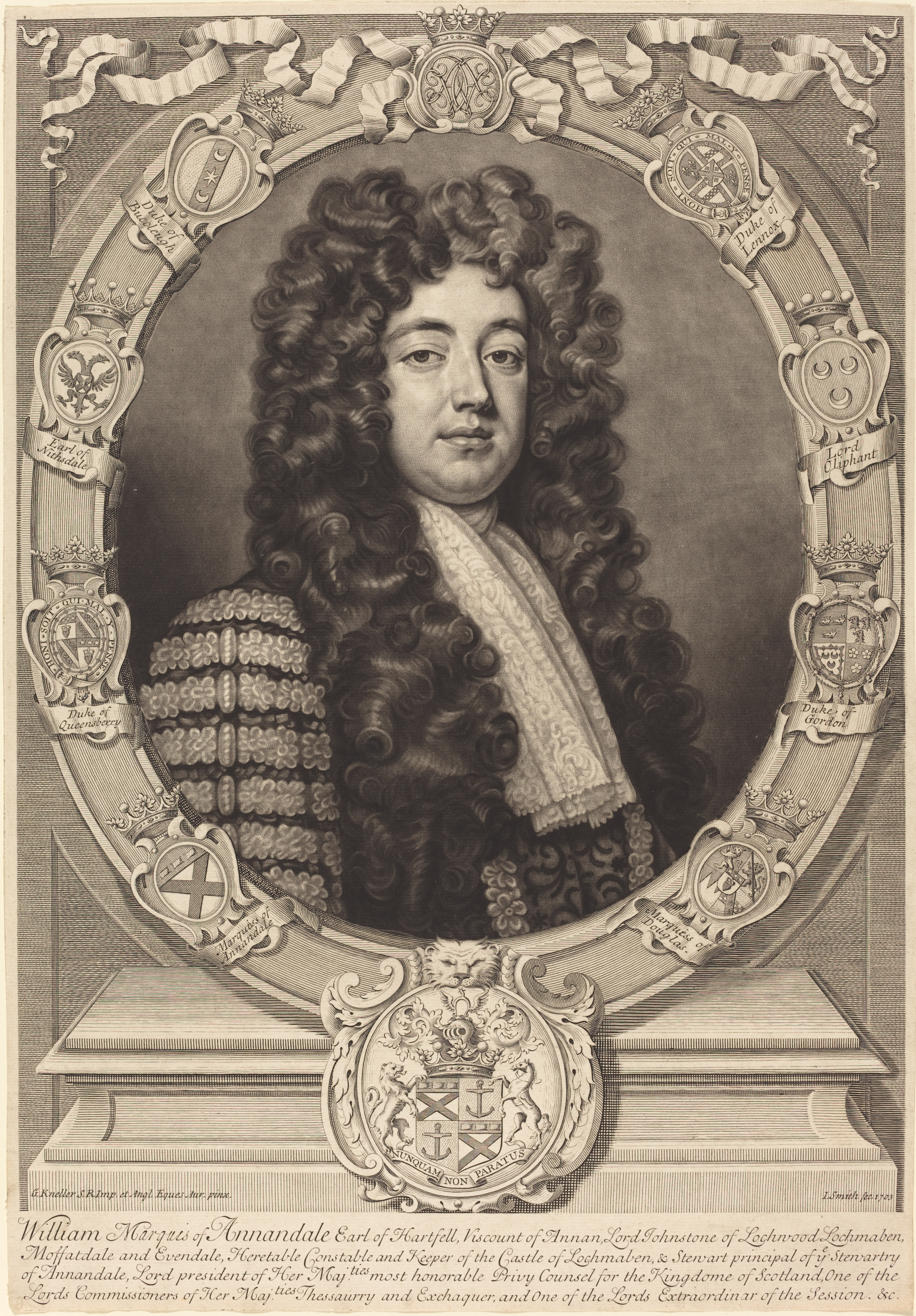
The 1st Marquess of Annandale.

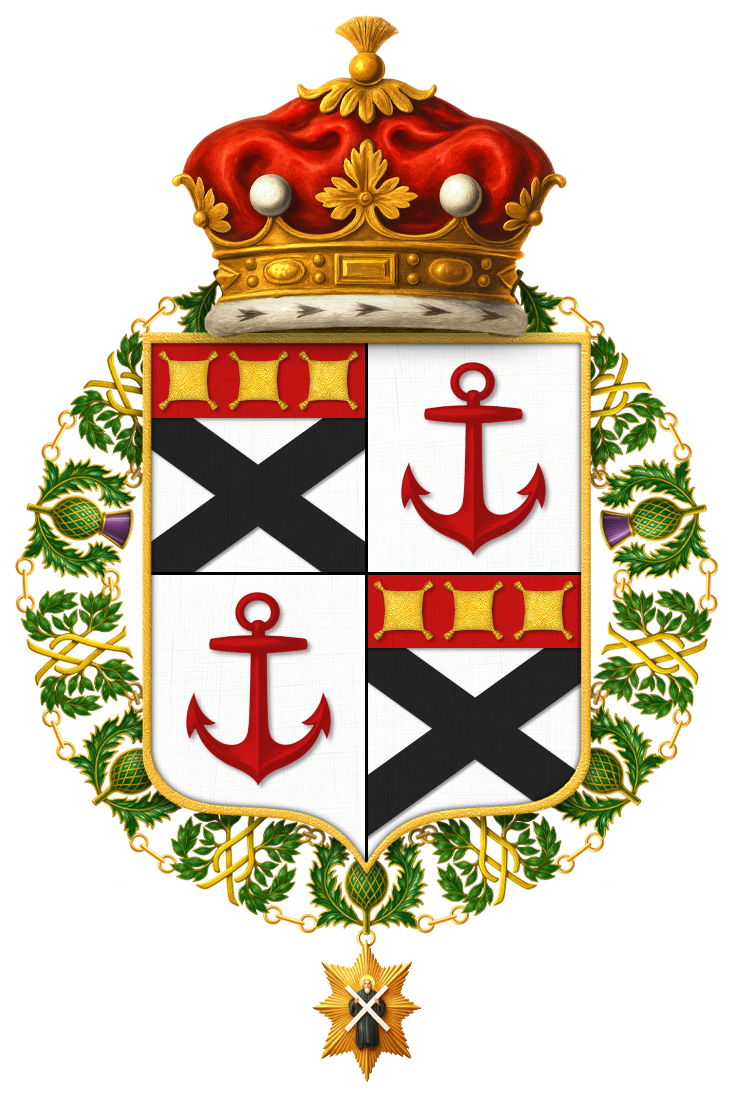
Shield of Arms of William Johnstone, 1st Marquess of Annandale, KT

William Johnstone, 2nd Earl of Annandale and Hartfell, 1st Marquess of Annandale KT (17 February 1664 – 14 January 1721) was a Scottish nobleman. He was the son of James Johnstone, 1st Earl of Hartfell and Henrietta Douglas. He succeeded to the Earldom of Annandale and Hartfell on the death of his father in 1672.

He was a friend of Monmouth and nominally supported Revolution, but joined "The Club" of Jacobite malcontents and was imprisoned in connection with the Montgomery plot. He was restored to favour on making a confession and was created an Extraordinary Lord of Session in 1693, and a Lord of the Treasury. He received a pension for services in connection with the Glencoe inquiry.

He was created Marquess of Annandale in 1701, Lord High Commissioner to the General Assembly of the Church of Scotland in 1701 and 1711, Keeper of the Privy Seal of Scotland in 1702, and president of the Privy Council of Scotland from 1692 to 1695, 1702–4 and 1705–6. He was appointed a Knight of the Thistle in 1704, joint Secretary of State from March–September 1705.

He opposed the Union, but later served as a Scottish representative peer from 1709 to 1713. He was Keeper of the Great Seal of Scotland from 1714 to 1716.

William was married twice: first on 1 January 1682 to Sophia Fairholme, daughter of John Fairholme of Craigiehall, and second on 20 November 1718 to Charlotte Van Lore Bempde, daughter of John Vanden Bempde of Hackness.

== Children of first marriage ==
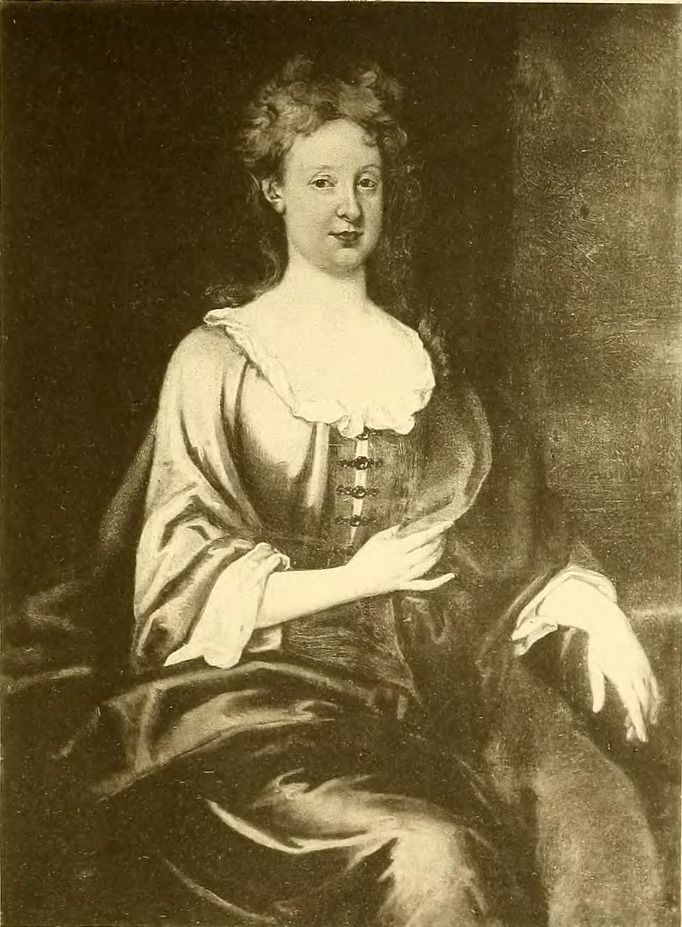
Sophia Fairholm, first Marchioness of Annandale

by Sophia Fairholme

1. Lady Henrietta Johnstone (11 November 1682 – 25 November 1750) married on 31 August 1699 to Charles Hope, 1st Earl of Hopetoun
2. Mary Johnstone (15 June 1686 – died an infant)
3. James Johnstone, 2nd Marquess of Annandale (1687– 21 February 1730) died unmarried
4. John Johnstone born in 1688 and died young
5. William Johnstone (1696 – 24 December 1721)

== Children of second marriage ==
by Charlotte Van Lore Bempde

1. George Johnstone, 3rd Marquess of Annandale (29 May 1720 – 29 April 1792) died unmarried
2. John Johnstone (8 June 1721 – October 1742) married Mary Beddoe of Ludlow

Political offices
Preceded by James Ogilvy	Keeper of the Great Seal of Scotland; 1714–1716	Succeeded by James Graham
Peerage of Scotland
New creation	Marquess of Annandale; 1701–1721	Succeeded by James Johnstone
Preceded by James Johnstone	Earl of Annandale and Hartfell; 1672–1721	Succeeded by James Johnstone
