= Alexander Hope (British Army officer) =

British Army general (1769–1837)

General Sir Alexander Hope GCB
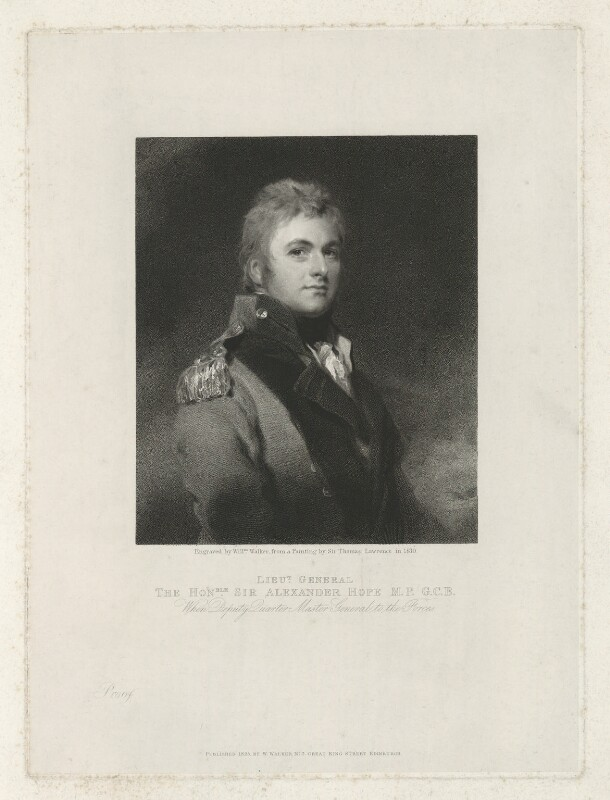
- Sir Alexander Hope, National Portrait Gallery, London
- Born: 2 December 1769
- Died: 19 May 1837 (aged 67)
- Military career
- Allegiance: United Kingdom
- Branch: British Army
- Rank: General
- Commands: 14th Regiment of Foot; Royal Military College, Great Marlow, later at Sandhurst
- Conflicts: French Revolutionary Wars
- Awards: Knight Grand Cross of the Order of the Bath

General Sir Alexander Hope GCB (2 December 1769 – 19 May 1837) was a British Army officer and the last Governor of the Royal Military College while it was at Great Marlow and the first Governor after its move to Sandhurst.

== Military career ==
Born the son of John Hope, 2nd Earl of Hopetoun, Alexander Hope was commissioned as an ensign in the 63rd Regiment of Foot in 1786.

He commanded the 14th Regiment of Foot at the skirmish at Geldermalsen, the Netherlands, in 1795 during the Flanders Campaign and was severely wounded, losing an arm and being left permanently lame. He was appointed Lieutenant-Governor of Tynemouth and Cliff Fort in 1797, Lieutenant-Governor of Edinburgh Castle in 1798 and Deputy Assistant Adjutant General to the Forces in Holland in 1799. He went on to serve as Deputy Quartermaster General to the Forces. He became Governor of the Royal Military College in 1812 and, although he stood down as Governor of the College in 1819, he became Governor of the College again in 1824 before he went on to be Lieutenant-Governor of the Royal Hospital Chelsea in 1826.

He was promoted full General in 1830. He was made Colonel of the 74th Foot in 1809, the 47th Foot in 1813 and the 14th Foot from 1835 to his death.

He was also Member of Parliament for Dumfries Burgh from 1796 to 1800 and for Linlithgowshire from 1800 to 1834.

== Family ==
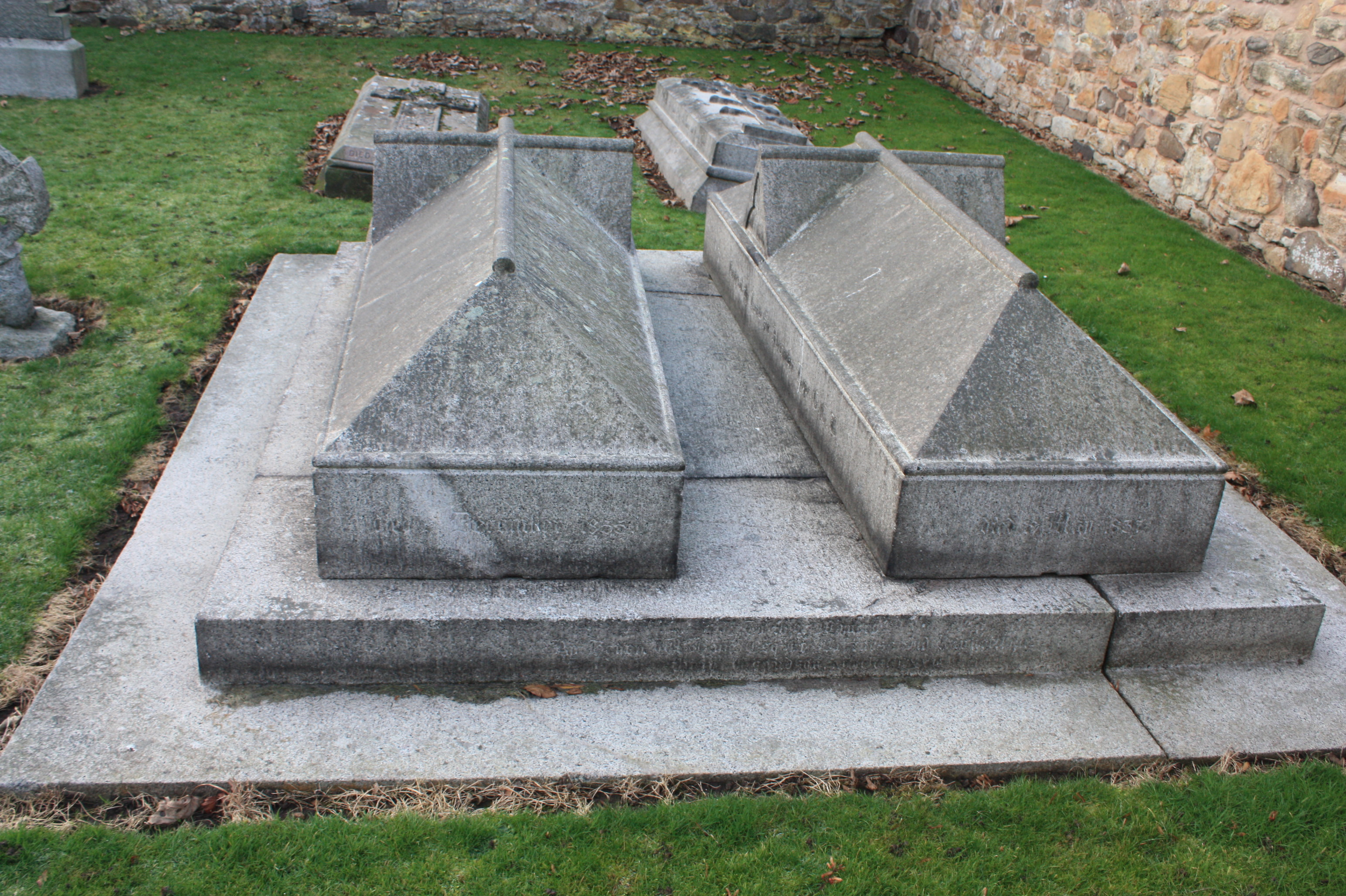
The paired grave of Georgina and Sir Alexander Hope GCB, Aberlady Churchyard

In 1805 Hope married Georgiana Brown, daughter of George Brown and Dorothea Dundas. Together they had four sons, including:

1. George William Hope m. Hon. Caroline Montagu, granddaughter of 3rd Duke of Buccleuch, had issue.
2. James Robert Hope-Scott m. firstly to Charlotte Lockhart, daughter of John Lockhart and Sophia Scott, daughter of Sir Walter Scott. They had one daughter Mary Hope-Scott. James m. secondly to Lady Victoria, daughter of 14th Duke of Norfolk, they had James Hope, 1st Baron Rankeillour and two daughters.

Upon his death, Alexander was buried with Georgina in Aberlady churchyard.

== Legacy ==
The Memorials to Governors in the Chapel of the present-day Royal Military Academy, Sandhurst, includes: ″In Memory of Gen. the Honble. Sir Alexander Hope, G.C.B., Colonel 14th Foot. Born 9th Dec, 1769; died 17 May 1837. Commanded the 14th Regiment at Gueldermalsen, 1795; wounded. D.A.A.G. to the Forces in Holland, 1799. Twice Special Envoy to the King of Sweden. Governor R.M. College, Great Marlow, 1811–12. Governor of this College, 1812–19, and again, 1824–26. Lieut.-Governor Chelsea Hospital, 1826–37.″

Parliament of Great Britain
Preceded by Patrick Miller	Member of Parliament for Dumfries Burghs; 1796–1800	Succeeded by William Johnstone Hope
Preceded by John Hope	Member of Parliament for Linlithgowshire; 1800–1801	Succeeded by Parliament of the United Kingdom
Parliament of the United Kingdom
Preceded by Parliament of Great Britain	Member of Parliament for Linlithgowshire; 1801–1835	Succeeded by James Hope
Military offices
Preceded by Earl Harcourt	Governor of the Royal Military College Sandhurst; 1811–1819	Succeeded by Sir George Murray
Preceded by Sir George Murray	Governor of the Royal Military College Sandhurst; 1824–1826	Succeeded by Sir Edward Paget
Preceded by Sir Charles Colville	Colonel of the 14th (Buckinghamshire) Regiment of Foot; 1835–1837	Succeeded by Sir James Watson
Preceded by Richard Fitzpatrick	Colonel of the 47th (Lancashire) Regiment of Foot; 1813–1835	Succeeded by Sir William Anson, 1st Baronet
Preceded by Sir John Stuart, Count of Maida	Colonel of the 74th Regiment of Foot; 1809–1813	Succeeded by James Montgomerie
