= Patrick Hope-Johnstone, 11th Earl of Annandale and Hartfell =

Scottish nobleman

Patrick Andrew Wentworth Hope-Johnstone, 11th Earl of Annandale and Hartfell (born 19 April 1941), is a Scottish peer. He succeeded his father as chief of Clan Johnstone in 1983, and his claim to an earldom was recognized three years later. He was a member of the House of Lords from 1986 to 1999.

A member of Lloyd's of London from 1976 until 2004, he has also served as a member of Dumfriesshire County Council and the Dumfries and Galloway Council and as Vice-Lord Lieutenant of Dumfries.

== Family ==
Hope-Johnstone is the son of Major Percy Wentworth Hope-Johnstone (died 1983) and his second wife Margaret Hunter-Arundell. He was educated at Stowe School and the Royal Agricultural College, Cirencester.

In 1969, he married Susan, the daughter of Walter John Macdonald Ross, by whom he has one son and one daughter:

- David Patrick Wentworth Hope-Johnstone, Lord Johnstone (born 1971), married 2001 (div. 2020), Penelope Jane Macmillan and has issue, a son Percy (b.2002) and daughters Anna (born 2003) and Rose (born 2009). David also has issue, a son Kit (born 2019) with partner Sarah Sherlock.
- Lady Julia Claire Hope-Johnstone (born 1974), married Andrew Lindsay Curtis Barnard and has issue three children.

In 1983, Patrick succeeded his father as chief of the Clan Johnstone, hereditary steward of Annandale and hereditary keeper of Lochmaben Castle. Hope-Johnstone continued to prosecute the family claim to the earldom of Annandale and Hartfell, his father being the heir of the eldest daughter of the second earl. Previous claims, based on letters patent of 1661, had been rejected as their remainder only encompassed heirs male general; however, Hope-Johnstone was able to produce a royal charter of 1662 which extended the remainder. This was recognized by the Committee for Privileges as a creation of an earldom in its own right, and he was summoned to the House of Lords in 1986 as Earl of Annandale and Hartfell. The peerage granted under the Letters Patent of 1661 remains vacant as at 2023.

== Career ==
Hope-Johnstone served on various committees of Dumfriesshire County Council from 1970 to 1975. From 1974 to 1986, he was a member of the Dumfries and Galloway Council. From 1984 to 1986, he served on the Scottish Valuation Advisory Council to the Secretary of State for Scotland. In 1987, he was appointed a deputy lieutenant of Dumfries, and in 1992 became Vice-Lord Lieutenant of Dumfries.

From 1976 until 2004, he was an underwriting member of Lloyd's of London. From 1985 to 1988, he was a director of Bowrings Members Agency, and of then of its successor Murray Lawrence until 1992.

Hope-Johnstone sat on the Solway River Purification Board from 1970 to 1986. From 1981 to 1984, he was chairman of the Royal Scottish Forestry Society, and he was appointed to the Annan Fishery Board in 1983. From 1984 to 1988, he chaired the Royal Jubilee Trust and The Prince's Trust for Dumfries and Galloway.

Peerage of Scotland
Preceded by Percy Wentworth Hope-Johnstone	Earl of Annandale and Hartfell; 1983–present	Incumbent; Heir apparent: David Hope-Johnstone, Lord Johnstone
