= George Vanden-Bempde, 3rd Marquess of Annandale =

The Most Honourable The Marquess of Annandale
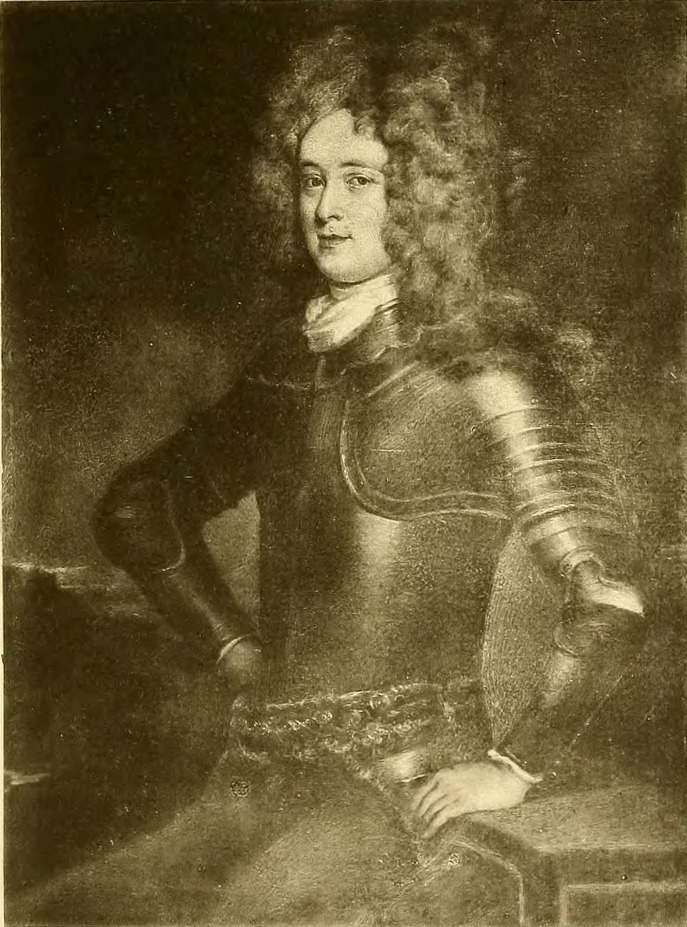
- Born: 29 May 1720
- Died: 29 April 1792
- Parents: William Johnstone, 1st Marquess of Annandale (father); Charlotte van Lore van den Bempdé (mother)

George Vanden Bempde (earlier Johnstone) (29 May 1720 – 29 April 1792), 3rd Marquess of Annandale, succeeded James Johnstone, 2nd Marquess of Annandale on his death in 1730 (but in practice from 1733), and enjoyed that title from then to his own death, whereupon the title became extinct.

Marquis of Annandale's Name Act 1744
- Act of Parliament
- Parliament of Great Britain
- Long title: An Act to enable George Vanden Bempde Marquis of Annandale to use the Surname and Arms of Vanden Bempde, pursuant to the Will of John Vanden Bempde Esquire, deceased.
- Citation: 18 Geo. 2. c. 4 Pr.
- Territorial extent: Great Britain

Dates
- Royal assent: 19 March 1745
- Commencement: 27 November 1744 (Note: Start of session.)

Status: Current legislation

His change of surname from Johnstone to Vanden Bempde was a condition of receiving an inheritance from John Vanden Bempde, and was confirmed by a private act of Parliament, Marquis of Annandale's Name Act 1744 (18 Geo. 2. c. 4 Pr.). The philosopher David Hume wrote in his autobiography that he spent a year (1745-46) living with and supporting the "young nobleman", "for the state of his mind and health required it".

== See also ==
- Earl of Annandale and Hartfell
- Sir Richard Vanden-Bempde-Johnstone, 1st Baronet
- Johnstone Baronets of Westerhall

== Notes ==
Peerage of Scotland
Preceded by James Johnstone	Marquess of Annandale; 1730–1792	Extinct
Preceded by James Johnstone	Earl of Annandale and Hartfell; 1730–1792	Dormant de jure James Hope-Johnstone
