= James Johnstone, 1st Earl of Hartfell =

Scottish peer

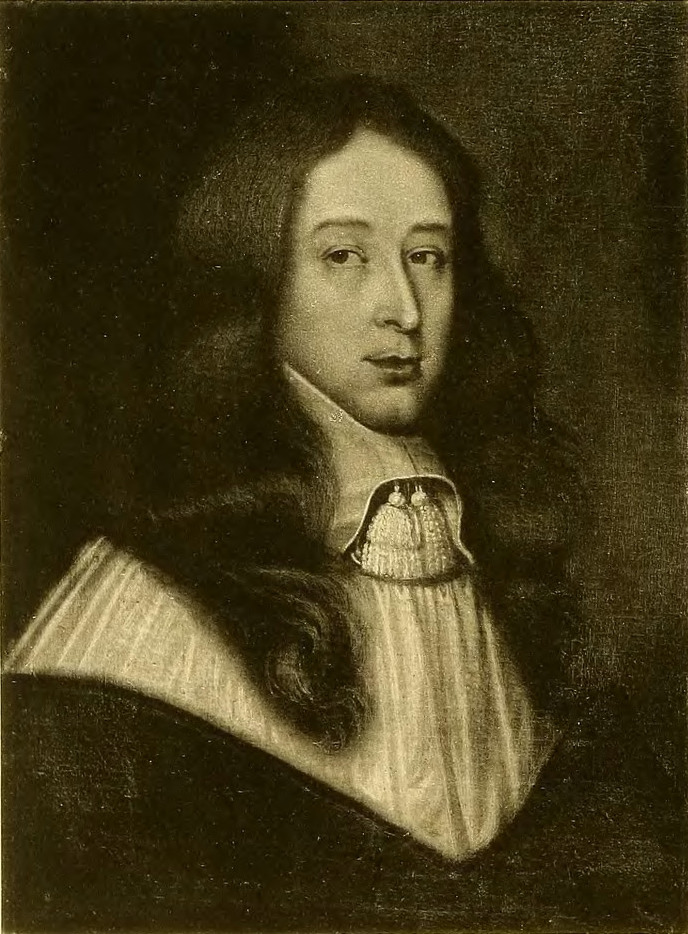
- Born: 1602
- Died: April 1653 (aged 50–51)
- Spouse(s): Lady Margaret Douglas

James Johnstone, 1st Earl of Hartfell (1602 – April 1653) was a Scottish peer and royalist.

== Background ==
He was the only son of Sir James Johnstone, the Warden of the West Marches and his wife Sarah, sister of William Maxwell, 5th Lord Herries of Terregles. After the murder of his father by John Maxwell, 9th Lord Maxwell in 1608, Johnstone, aged six, succeeded to the barony of Newby. In 1623, King James I of England was able to determine the feud between the two families.

== Career ==
At King Charles's I of England coronation on 20 June 1633, Johnstone was elevated to the Peerage of Scotland as Lord Johnstone of Lochwood. From 1637, he represented the Covenanter in the court and in the next year, he took part in the General Assembly in Glasgow. Johnstone raised a regiment in the Second Bishops' War in 1640, however was not involved in the fightings. On 8 March 1643, he was further honoured with the titles Lord Johnston of Lochwood, Moffatdale and Evandale and Earl of Hartfell. Johnstone supported the king in the English Civil War and was imprisoned at Edinburgh Castle by the Committee of Estates in 1644. Having been released in March of the following year, he fought in the Battle of Kilsyth and was captured in November, following the Battle of Philiphaugh. Although sentenced to death at St Andrews, Johnstone later received a pardon. In 1648, when the Engagers signed a treaty with the king, he was preventively arrested.

== Family ==
On 29 November 1622, he married firstly Lady Margaret Douglas, eldest daughter of William Douglas, 1st Earl of Queensberry. After her death in 1640, Johnstone remarried, Elizabeth, daughter of Sir Samuel Johnston, 1st Baronet on 6 March 1643. She died only few years later and on 25 February 1647 he married finally Lady Margaret Hamilton, third daughter of Thomas Hamilton, 1st Earl of Haddington in Holyrood Abbey in Edinburgh. Johnstone had six children by his first wife, four daughters and two sons. He died at London in 1653 and was succeeded in his titles by his older son William Johnstone, 1st Marquess of Annandale.

Peerage of Scotland
New creation	Earl of Hartfell; 1643–1653	Succeeded by James Johnstone
New creation	Lord Johnstone of Lochwood; 1633–1653	Succeeded by James Johnstone
