= James Hope-Johnstone, 3rd Earl of Hopetoun =

Scottish peer, politician, and military officer

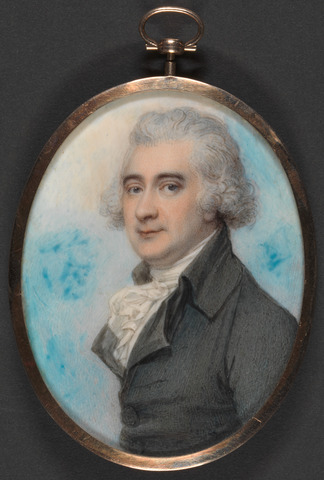
A watercolor of Lord Hopetoun by Richard Cosway

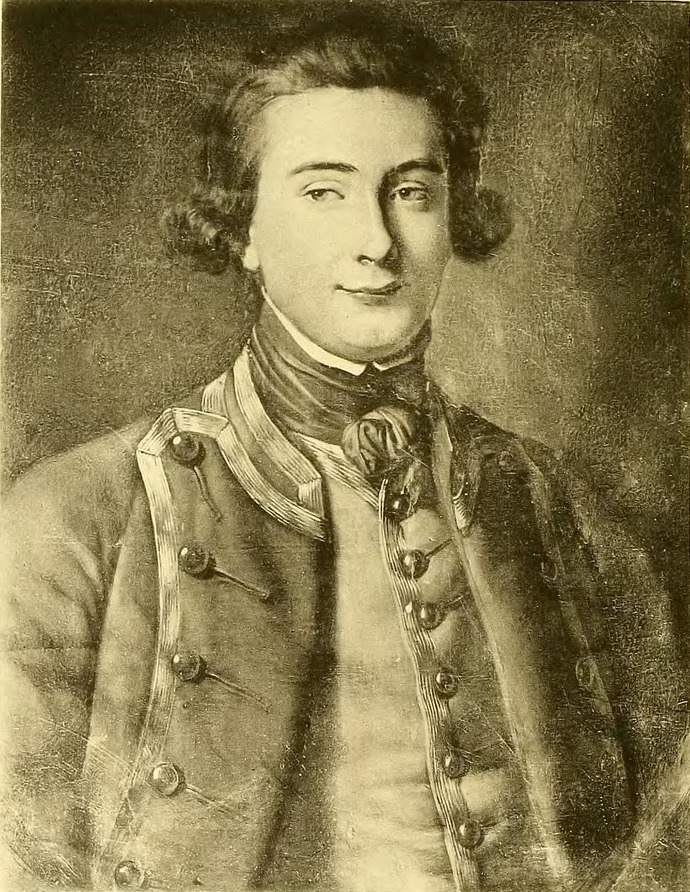
James Hope-Johnstone, 3rd Earl of Hopetoun

James Hope-Johnstone, 3rd Earl of Hopetoun FRSE (23 August 1741 – 29 May 1816) was a Scottish peer, politician and military officer.

== Life ==
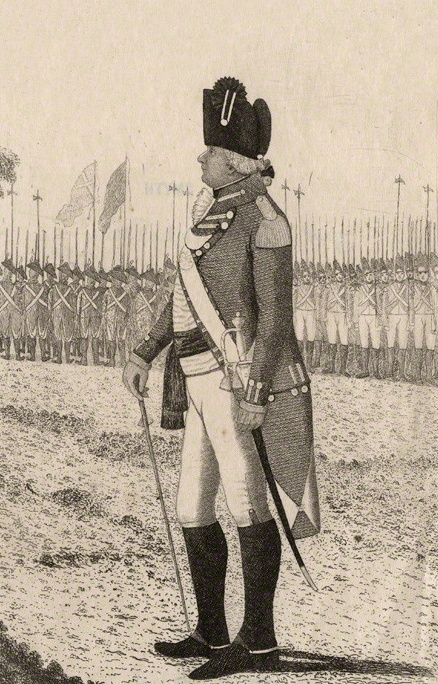
The Earl of Hopetoun in military outfit.

Hopetoun was the son of John Hope, 2nd Earl of Hopetoun, and his first wife, Lady Anne Ogilvy, daughter of James Ogilvy, 5th Earl of Findlater. His many siblings and half-siblings included his sister Lady Henrietta Hope.

Being set on a military career he spent from 1758 until 1764 as an Ensign (junior officer) in the British Army.

He succeeded to the earldom of Hopetoun on the death of his father in 1781. He was Lord-Lieutenant of Linlithgowshire from 1794 to 1816 and sat in the House of Lords as a Scottish representative peer from 1784 to 1790 and from 1794 to 1796.

In 1786 he was elected a Fellow of the Royal Society of Scotland. His proposers were John Walker, James Hutton, and Henry Cullen.

In 1809 he was created Baron Hopetoun, of Hopetoun in the County of Linlithgow, in the Peerage of the United Kingdom, with remainder to the heirs male of his father. In 1792 Hopetoun succeeded de jure as fifth Earl of Annandale and Hartfell on the death of his great-uncle, although he never successfully claimed the title. He also inherited the Johnstone family estates and assumed this surname in addition to that of Hope.

He died in Hopetoun House on 29 May 1816.

== Family ==
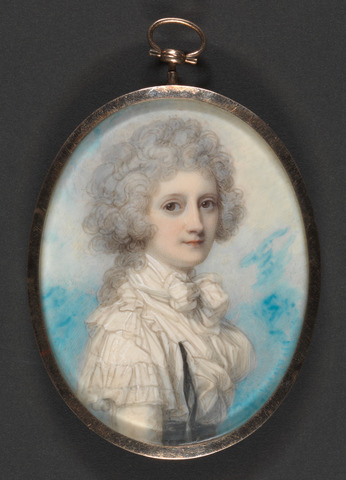
Elizabeth, Countess of Hopetoun

Lord Hopetoun married Lady Elizabeth Carnegie (d. 1793), daughter of George Carnegie, 6th Earl of Northesk, in 1766. They had five daughters. Lord Hopetoun survived Elizabeth by over twenty years and died in May 1816, aged 74. He was succeeded in the earldom of Hopetoun by his half-brother, John Hope. The claim to the earldom of Annandale and Hartfell passed to his eldest daughter Lady Anne, who married William Johnstone Hope.

- His daughter Lady Elizabeth (b. 16 Oct 1768, d. 17 Sept 1801) married Rev John Kemp of Edinburgh 29 Aug 1799[Rev Kemp's 1st wife had been Lady Mary Anne Carnegie [1764-d.10 Aug 1798] a sister of Lady Elizabeth Carnegie
- His daughter Georgiana Hope-Johnstone (d. 1797) married Andrew Cochrane, youngest son of Thomas Cochrane, 8th Earl of Dundonald, in 1793; Cochrane added "Johnstone" to his name to become Andrew Cochrane-Johnstone. He had a checkered career in the military and Parliament that ended with his involvement in the Great Stock Exchange Fraud of 1814.

Hope-Johnstone's brothers-in-law included Charles Hope, Lord Granton, Henry Dundas, Viscount Melville, and Sir Patrick Murray of Ochtertyre.

Honorary titles
New title Office created	Lord-Lieutenant of Linlithgowshire; 1794–1816	Succeeded by The Earl of Hopetoun
Peerage of Scotland
Preceded by John Hope	Earl of Hopetoun; 1781–1816	Succeeded by John Hope
Peerage of the United Kingdom
New title	Baron Hopetoun; 1809–1816	Succeeded by John Hope
