= Charles Hope, 1st Earl of Hopetoun =

Scottish politician and noble (1681–1742)

The Right Honourable The Earl of Hopetoun KT PC

Shire Commissioner for Linlithgow
- In office 1702–1703 Serving with Patrick Murray
- Preceded by: Patrick Murray; Thomas Shairp
- Succeeded by: Thomas Shairp; John Montgomerie

Personal details
- Born: Charles Hope; 1681
- Died: 26 February 1742 (aged 60–61)
- Spouse: Lady Henrietta Johnstone (after 1699)
- Relations: James Hope of Hopetoun (grandfather)
- Parent: John Hope

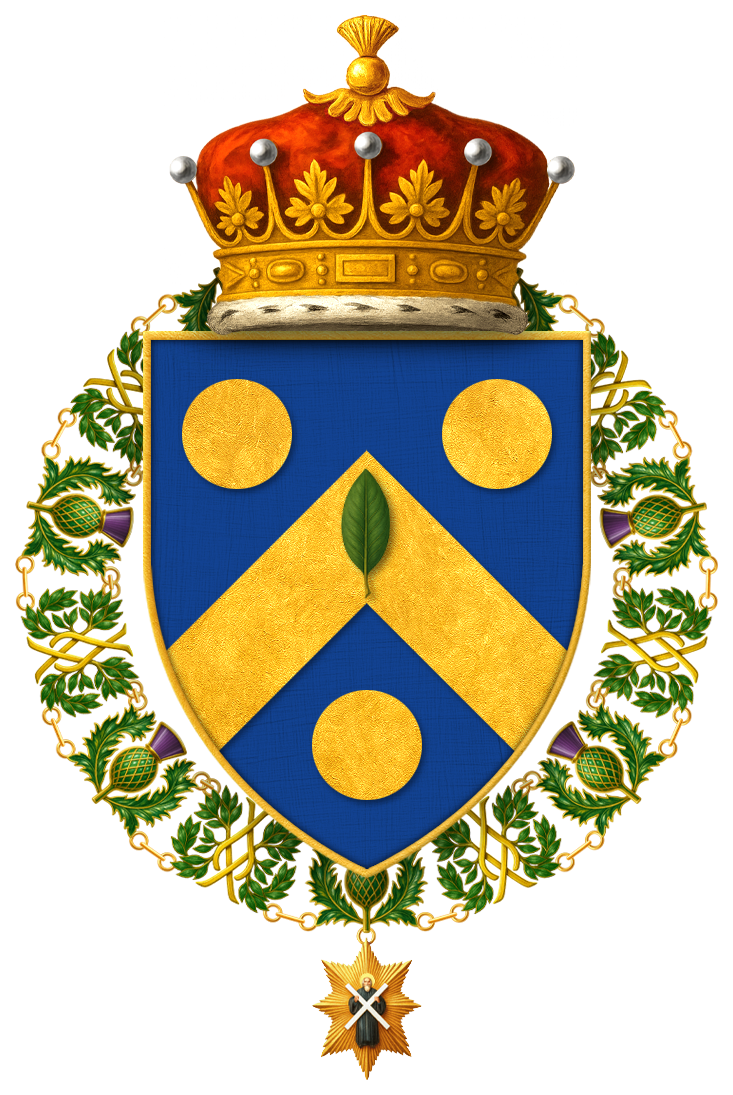
Shield of Arms of Charles Hope, 1st Earl of Hopetoun, KT, encircled with the collar of the Order of the Thistle

Charles Hope, 1st Earl of Hopetoun, KT, PC (1681 – 26 February 1742) was a Scottish nobleman.

== Early life ==
He was the son of John Hope of Hopetoun and his wife Lady Margaret, daughter of the 4th Earl of Haddington. His father, John Hope, purchased the barony of Niddry Castle from George Seton, 4th Earl of Winton around 1680. He also bought the neighbouring barony of Abercorn, with the office of heritable sheriff of the County of Linlithgow, from Sir Walter Seton.

His paternal grandfather was Sir James Hope of Hopetoun and paternal great-grandfather was Sir Thomas Hope, 1st Baronet of Craighall, Fife.

=== Peerage ===
In 1681, John Hope was shire commissioner for Linlithgow in the Parliament of Scotland. The following year, his father drowned with the sinking of HMS Gloucester in 1682. Traveling with the Duke of York, family tradition has that his father had secured a seat in a rescue boats but gave it up to the Duke of York. The tradition continues that in recognition of this act, Charles was created Earl of Hopetoun in the Peerage of Scotland by Queen Anne on 15 April 1703, shortly after reaching his majority.

The family estates and businesses, including lead mining, were managed on his behalf by his mother, Lady Margaret Hope of Hopetoun. She revived plan to build a church for their miners at Leadhills, and commenced the building of Hopetoun House.

== Career ==
Charles Hope supported the union with England. He later served as a Scottish representative peer at Westminster, from 1722 until his death. Lord Hopetoun acted as Lord High Commissioner to the General Assembly of the Church of Scotland in 1723, and was Governor of the Bank of Scotland from 1740 until his death. He was created a Knight of the Thistle in 1738.

Around 1738/9 he bought the entire estate of Ormiston from John Cockburn of Ormiston who had ironically bankrupted himself due to the cost of agricultural improvements and building the "model village" of Ormiston in 1736.

== Personal life ==
In 1699, Charles Hope married Lady Henrietta Johnstone, daughter of William Johnstone, 1st Marquess of Annandale and the former Sophia Fairholm (a daughter of John Fairholm of Craigiehall). Their children include:

- Lady Sophia Hope (1702–1761), who married, as his second wife, James Ogilvy, 5th Earl of Findlater, in 1723.
- John Hope, 2nd Earl of Hopetoun (1704–1781), who married Lady Anne Ogilvy, second daughter of James Ogilvy, 5th Earl of Findlater.
- Lady Henrietta Hope (1706–1745), who married, as his first wife, Francis Napier, 6th Lord Napier of Merchistoun, after 1729.
- Lady Margaret Hope (1708–1778), who married John Dundas of Duddingston in 1745.
- Charles Hope-Weir (1710–1791), who married Catherine Weir, daughter and heiress of Sir William Weir of Blackwood, Bt. After her death in 1743, he married Lady Anne Vane, a daughter of Henry Vane, 1st Earl of Darlington; he married thirdly to Helen Dunbar, a daughter of George Dunbar of Leuchold.
- Lady Helen Hope (1711–1778), who married James Watson of Saughton, in 1737.
- Lady Christian Hope (1714–1799), who married Thomas Graham of Balgowan in 1743.
- Lady Charlotte Hope (1720–1788), who married the Thomas Erskine, Lord Erskine, only child and heir apparent of John Erskine, 6th Earl of Mar and Lady Margaret Hay (daughter of Thomas Hay, 7th Earl of Kinnoull), in 1741.

Lord Hopetoun died on 26 February 1742 and was succeeded in the earldom by his eldest son, John.

Parliament of Scotland
| Preceded by Patrick Murray; Thomas Shairp | Shire Commissioner for Linlithgow; 1702–1703; With: Patrick Murray | Succeeded by Thomas Shairp; John Montgomerie |
Peerage of Scotland
| New creation | Earl of Hopetoun; 1703–1742 | Succeeded by John Hope |
