= William Hay, 10th Marquess of Tweeddale =

Scottish landowner, peer and politician (1826–1911)

The Right Honourable The Marquess of Tweeddale KT DL
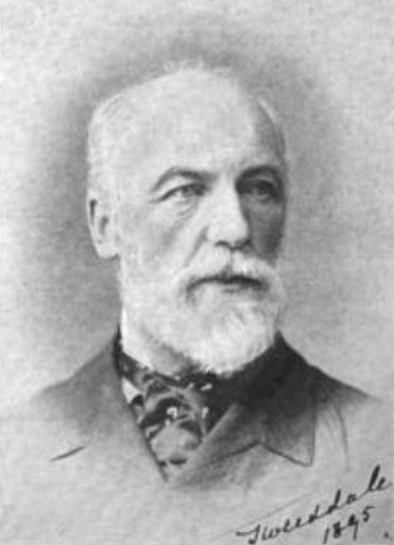
- In The Sketch, 27 November 1895

Member of Parliament for Haddington Burghs
- In office 1878–1879
- Preceded by: Sir Henry Ferguson Davie
- Succeeded by: Sir David Wedderburn, 3rd Baronet

Member of Parliament for Taunton
- In office 1865–1868
- Preceded by: Arthur Mills
- Succeeded by: Edward William Cox

Personal details
- Born: 29 January 1826 Yester House, Gifford, East Lothian
- Died: 25 November 1911 (aged 85) London, England
- Party: Liberal
- Spouse: Candida Louisa Bartolucci (after 1878)
- Education: Imperial Service College

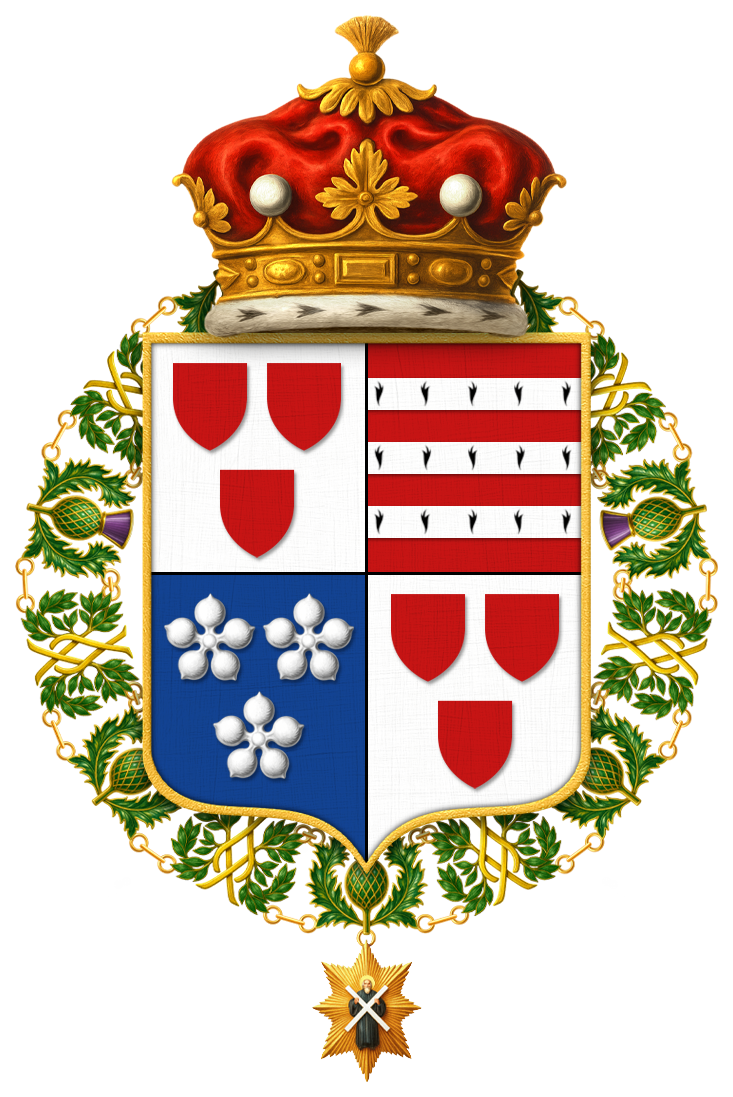
Shield of Arms of William Montagu Hay, 10th Marquess of Tweeddale, KT, DL

William Montagu Hay, 10th Marquess of Tweeddale, KT, DL (29 January 1826 – 25 November 1911), known before 1878 as Lord William Hay or Lord William Montagu Hay, was a Scottish landowner, peer and politician. He was born at Yester House, near Gifford, East Lothian, and served in British India as a member of the Bengal Civil Service and later as a Liberal Member of Parliament.

In 1878 he succeeded his brother as Marquess of Tweeddale and as owner of some 40,000 acres in Scotland. He went on to become Lord High Commissioner to the General Assembly of the Church of Scotland and was appointed a Knight of the Thistle.

== Early life ==
Hay was born at Yester House on 29 January 1826. He was the third son (of six sons and eight daughters) born to Lady Susan Montagu and George Hay, 8th Marquess of Tweeddale (1787–1876). Among his many prominent siblings were Lady Susan Hay (wife of James Broun-Ramsay, 1st Marquess of Dalhousie), Lady Hannah Hay (wife of Simon Watson Taylor), Lady Elizabeth Hay (wife of Arthur Wellesley, 2nd Duke of Wellington), George Hay, Earl of Gifford, Lord Arthur, later Earl of Gifford and later 9th Marquess of Tweeddale, Lord John Hay, Lady Jane Hay (wife of Sir Richard Taylor), and Lady Emily Hay (wife of Sir Robert Peel, 3rd Baronet).

His paternal grandfather was George Hay, 7th Marquess of Tweeddale and Lady Hannah Charlotte Maitland (a daughter of James Maitland, 7th Earl of Lauderdale). His maternal grandparents were William Montagu, 5th Duke of Manchester and Lady Susan Gordon (third daughter of Alexander Gordon, 4th Duke of Gordon).

As the third son of a Marquess who was not expected to inherit the title, Hay was educated at the Imperial Service College and prepared for a career in the Civil Service.

== Career ==
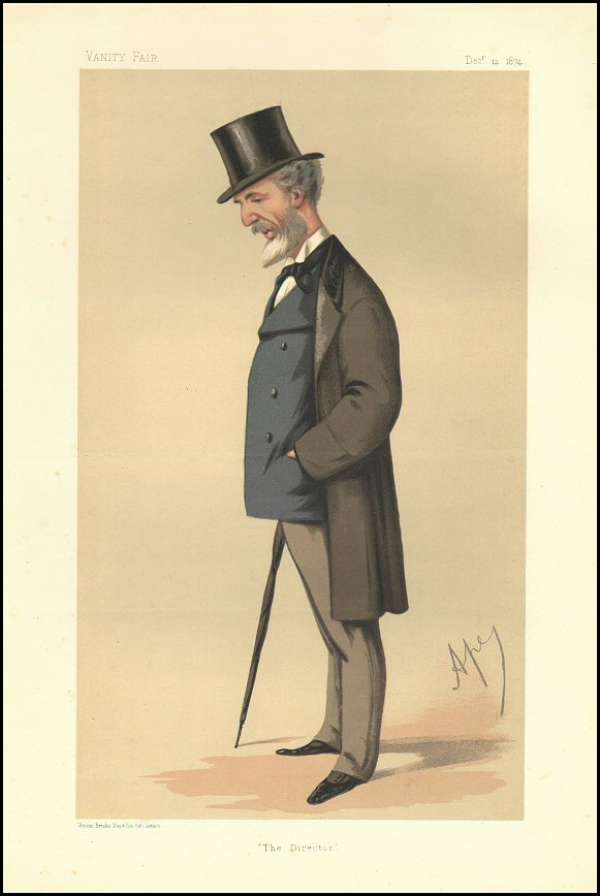
"The Director", caricature of Hay by "Ape" published in Vanity Fair in December 1874

From 1845 to 1862, he served in the Bengal Civil Service, including some years as Deputy Commissioner of Simla and then as Superintendent of the Hill States of Northern India, during which time he leased The Retreat in Mashobra.

Following his permanent return from India Hay was Liberal Member of Parliament for Taunton from 1865 to 1868, and was elected again for Haddington Burghs in 1878. He also became Chairman of the North British Railway Company.

After succeeding his brother Arthur as Marquess of Tweeddale on 29 December 1878, he became the owner of estates totalling some 40,000 acres in Scotland. In 1881 he was created Baron Tweeddale of Yester in the peerage of the United Kingdom, giving him a seat in the House of Lords.

As well as being Hereditary Chamberlain of Dunfermline, he was Lord High Commissioner to the General Assembly of the Church of Scotland from 1889 to 1892 and, again, from 1896 to 1897.

=== Honours ===
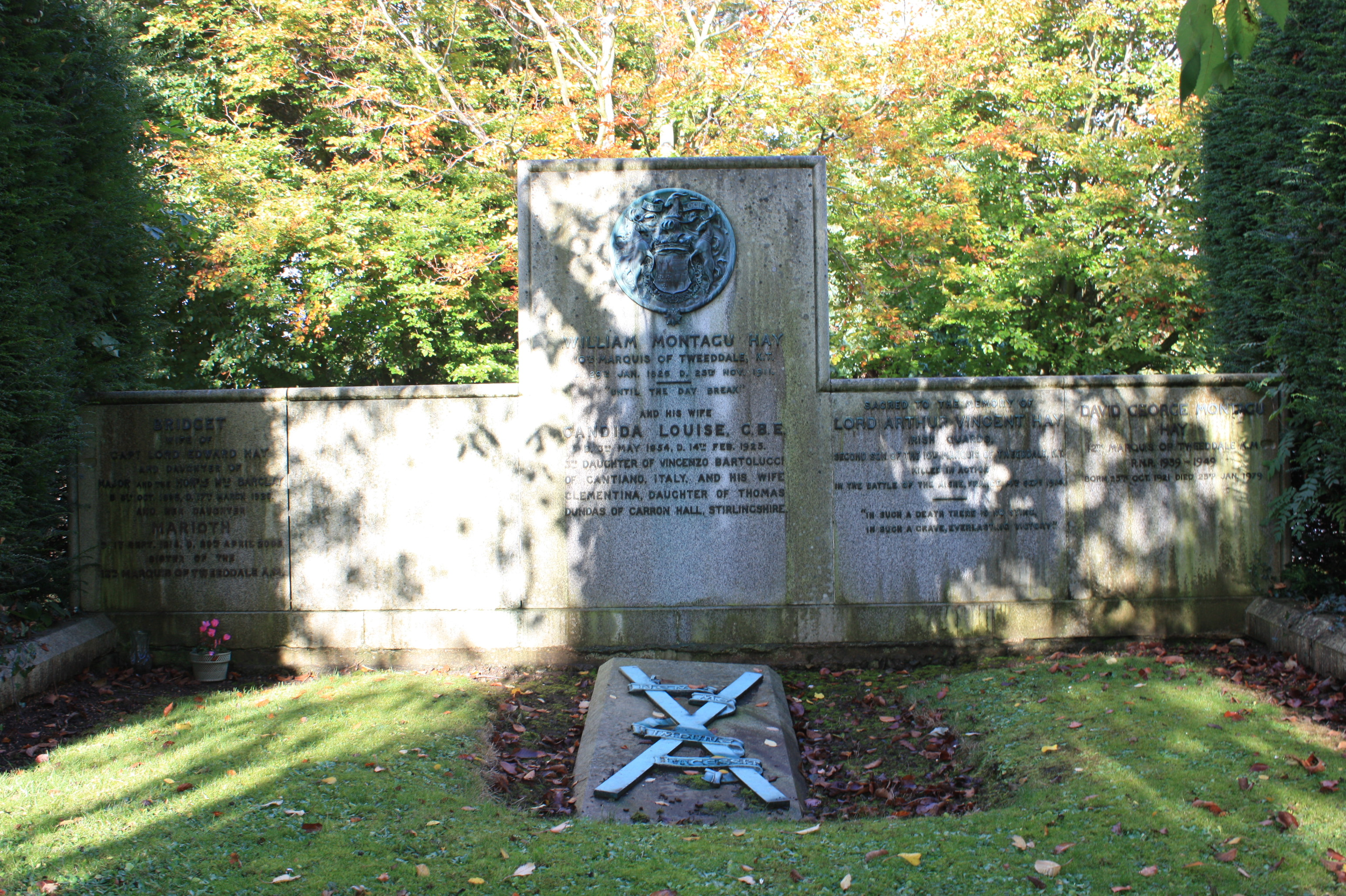
The grave of William Montagu Hay, Yester Parish Church, Gifford, East Lothian

On 26 October 1898 Tweeddale was appointed a Knight of the Thistle and was invested at Windsor Castle on 8 December. He was also a Deputy Lieutenant for the counties of Haddingtonshire (now called East Lothian and Berwickshire) and a Brigadier-General of the Royal Company of Archers, a ceremonial unit that serves as the Sovereign's Bodyguard in Scotland.

== Personal life ==
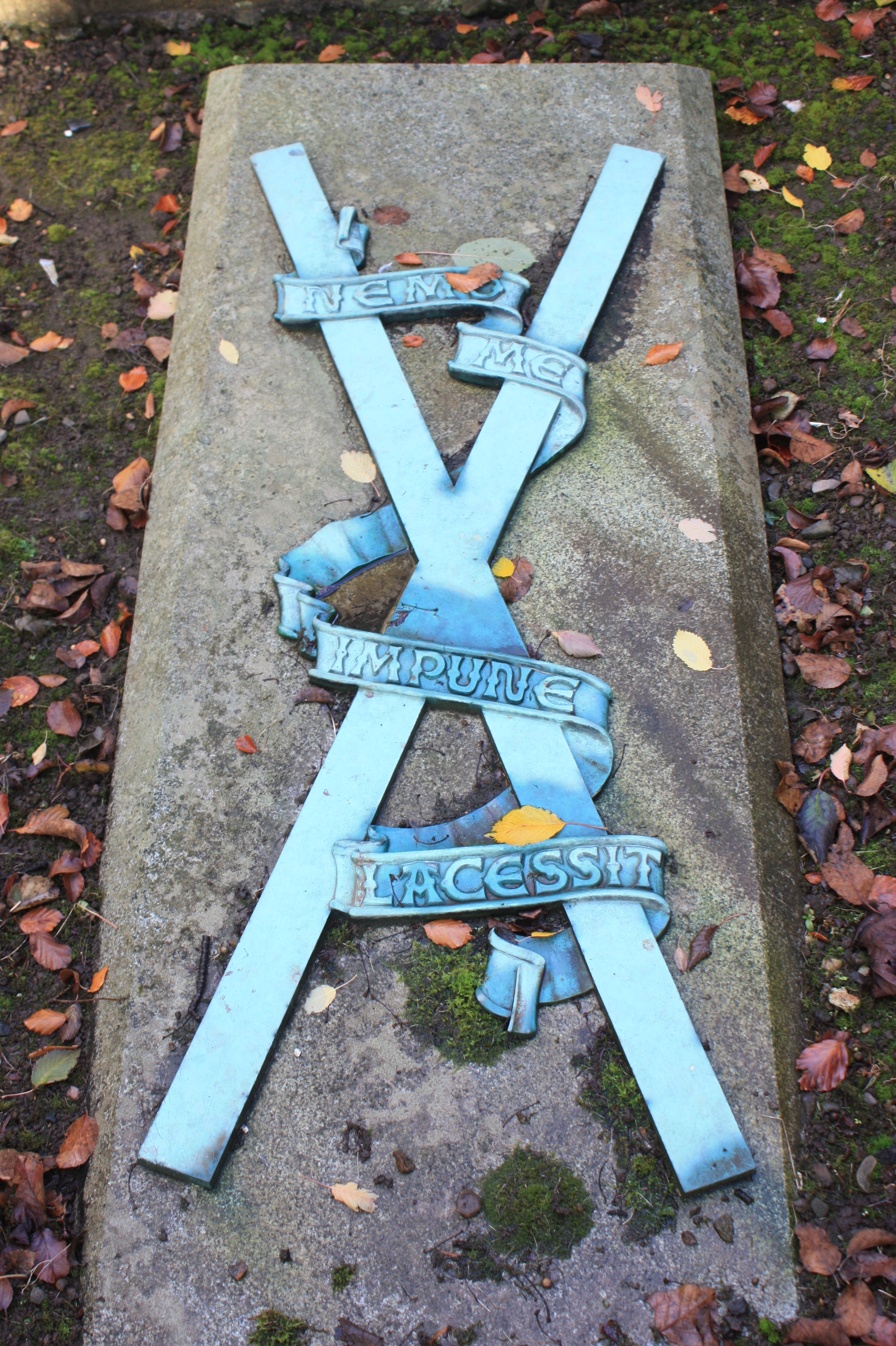
The grave of the 10th Marquess of Tweeddale, Yester Parish Church

On 18 May 1878, Lord Tweeddale was married to Candida Louise Bartolucci (1854–1925) at St Augustine's Church, London. Candida was a daughter of Signor Vincenzo Bartolucci of Cantiano, Italy. Candida's sister, Evelyn Bartolucci, was the second wife of Adm. Sir Astley Cooper Key. Together, William and Candida were the parents of:

- Lady Susan Elizabeth Clementine Hay (1879–1964), who married Walter Waring, MP, son of Charles Waring, MP, in 1901.
- Lady Candida Louisa Hay (1882–1882), who died at birth.
- William Hay, 11th Marquess of Tweeddale (1884–1967), who married Marguerite Christine Ralli, daughter of Alexander Ralli and step daughter of Lewis Einstein, in 1912.
- Lord Arthur Vincent Hay (1886–1914), who was killed in action in the First World War during the First Battle of the Aisne. The inscription on his gravestone in France reads: "IN SUCH A DEATH THERE IS NO STING IN SUCH A GRAVE EVERLASTING VICTORY. (MOTHER)". He married Menda Ralli, only daughter of Ambrose Ralli, in 1911. After his death, she married Col. Robert Edward Kennard Leatham.
- Lt. Col. Lord Edward Douglas Hay (1888–1944), who married Violet Florence Catherine "Bridget" Barclay, only daughter of Maj. Cameron Barclay, in 1917. Lord Edward Douglas Hay died in the Second World War in the V1 bomb attack on Guards Chapel, Wellington Barracks.

Lord William Montagu Hay died on 25 November 1911 at his house in London, 6 Hill Street, and was succeeded by his eldest son, the Earl of Gifford (born 1884). He is buried at Yester Parish Church in Gifford, East Lothian, close to his family home at Yester House.

=== Descendants ===
As his eldest son died without male issue, David George Montagu Hay, the son of his youngest son Lord Edward Douglas Hay, became the 12th Marquess of Tweeddale in 1967.

Parliament of the United Kingdom
Preceded by Sir Henry Ferguson Davie	Member of Parliament for Haddington; 1878–1879	Succeeded by Sir David Wedderburn, Bt
Preceded by Arthur Mills	Member of Parliament for Taunton; 1865–1868	Succeeded by Edward William Cox
Peerage of Scotland
Preceded by Arthur Hay	Marquess of Tweeddale; 1878–1911	Succeeded by William Hay
Peerage of the United Kingdom
New creation	Baron Tweeddale of Yester; 1881–1911	Succeeded by William Hay
