= Emily, Lady Peel =

British peeress

- Born: 1836; East Lothian, Scotland
- Died: 23 April 1924 (aged 88); Florence, Italy
- Spouse: Robert Peel (m. 1856; died 1895)
- Children: 5
- Father: George Hay
- Relatives: Susan Hay (sister); Elizabeth Hay (sister); Arthur Hay (brother); William Hay (brother); John Hay (brother); George Hay (brother)

Lady Emily Hay, Lady Peel (1836 – 23 April 1924), was the daughter of George Hay, 8th Marquess of Tweeddale, and of Lady Susan Montagu (18 September 1797 – 5 March 1870). One of ten siblings, she was born in Yester, East Lothian, Scotland, and baptised there on 28 February 1837.

== Biography ==
On 13 January 1856, she married Sir Robert Peel, 3rd Baronet, the eldest son of prime minister Sir Robert Peel, 2nd Baronet.

Their twin daughters Gwendolin Cecilia and Agnes Helen (1860–1964) were born in 1860, followed by Victoria Alexandrina Julia (1865–1935), Robert (1867–1925) and Evelyn Emily (1869–1960).

On 9 May 1895, aged 73, her husband was found dead, from hæmorrhage on the brain, in his bedroom at 12 Stratton Street, London. He was buried at Drayton-Bassett parish church on 16 May. Their only son Robert succeeded in the baronetcy.

Lady Peel was interested in dog racing and bred several award-winning borzoi. French Rosarian François Lacharme named a rose cultivar after her.

Lady Peel died aged 88 on 4 April 1924 in Florence, Tuscany, Italy.
