= George Hay, Earl of Gifford =

British politician

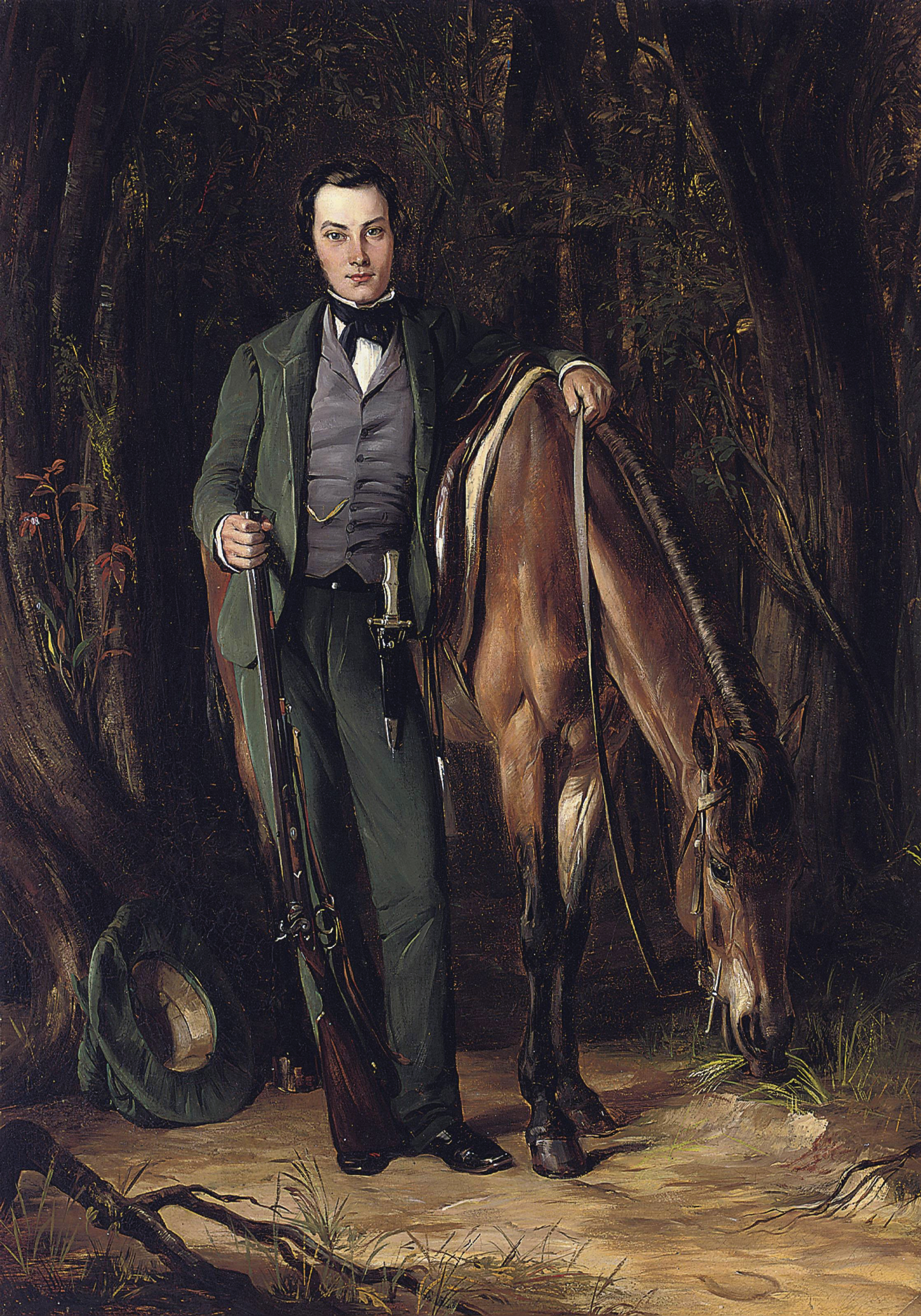
- George, Earl of Gifford (1822–1862)

Member of Parliament for Totnes
- In office 1855-1862

Personal details
- Born: 26 April 1822 Gifford, East Lothian, Scotland
- Died: 22 December 1862 (aged 40) Highgate, London, England
- Party: Liberal Party
- Spouse: Helen Blackwood (m. 1862)
- Parent: George Hay (father)
- Relatives: Susan Hay (sister); Elizabeth Hay (sister); Arthur Hay (brother); William Hay (brother); John Hay (brother); Emily Hay (sister)
- Education: Trinity College, Cambridge; Trinity Hall, Cambridge
- Military career
- Rank: Captain
- Unit: East Lothian Yeomanry Cavalry

George Hay, Earl of Gifford (26 April 1822 – 22 December 1862) was a British Liberal Party politician.

== Biography ==
Lord Gifford was born at Yester House, the eldest son of the 8th Marquess of Tweeddale. He was educated at Trinity College and Trinity Hall, Cambridge, where he was president of the University Pitt Club. In 1850, he was a Captain in the East Lothian Yeomanry Cavalry and became Private Secretary to the Secretary of State for War (The Duke of Newcastle) in 1854. A year later, he entered Parliament as MP for Totnes (a seat he held until his death).

In 1861, Lord Gifford was involved in an accident whilst rescuing a workman about to be crushed by a tree the latter was cutting down in the grounds of Yester Castle. Because of the accident, the Dowager Baroness Dufferin and Claneboye (a close friend of his who previously refused his proposals) agreed to marry Lord Gifford and they did so at Dufferin Lodge, Highgate on 13 October 1862.

After sixteen months of suffering as a result of the accident, Lord Gifford died on 22 December 1862 at Dufferin Lodge. He was buried at St James the Great, Friern Barnet. As he and his wife did not have any children, his brother, Lord Arthur Hay became the heir to their father's titles and estate.

== Sources ==
- Burke's Peerage & Gentry
- Electric Scotland - The Hays of Tweeddale
- Worldroots

Parliament of the United Kingdom
Preceded by Lord Seymour; Thomas Mills	Member of Parliament for Totnes; 1855–1862; With: Thomas Mills	Succeeded by John Pender; Alfred Seymour
