= Henry Loftus =

Henry Loftus may refer to:

- Henry Loftus and Harry Donaldson, two men who made headlines for their unsuccessful attempt to rob the Southern Pacific Railroad's Apache Limited in 1937
- Henry Loftus, 1st Earl of Ely (1709–1783), Irish peer and politician
- Lord Henry Loftus (1822–1880), Irish cricketer
- Henry Loftus (1725–1792), Anglo-Irish politician
