= James Hope-Vere =

Scottish landowner and politician

The Right Honourable James Joseph Hope-Vere FRSE

Member of Parliament for Ilchester
- In office 1830–1831 Serving with Michael Bruce
- Preceded by: Hon. Lionel Tollemache; Hon. Felix Tollemache
- Succeeded by: Hon. Edward Petre; Stephen Lushington

Personal details
- Born: James Joseph Hope-Vere; 3 June 1785
- Died: 19 May 1843 (aged 57) Mayfair, London
- Party: Whig
- Spouse: Lady Elizabeth Hay (m. 1813; died 1843)
- Relations: Charles Hope-Weir (grandfather)
- Children: 8, including Jane
- Parent(s): William Hope-Vere; Sophia Corrie
- Education: St John's College, Cambridge

James Joseph Hope-Vere of Craigiehall FRSE (3 June 1785 – 19 May 1843) was a 19th-century Scottish landowner and politician. As a politician he was deemed a moderate Whig.

== Early life ==
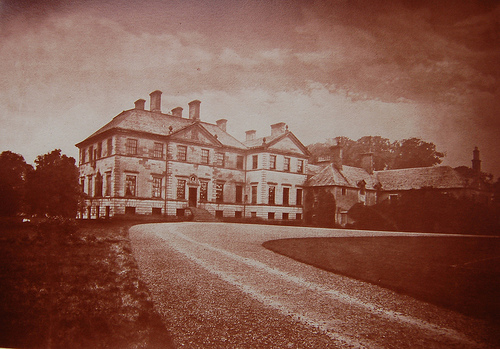
Craigiehall

He was born on 3 June 1785 the first surviving son of William Hope-Vere and his wife, Sophia Corrie of Dumfries. His paternal grandfather was Charles Hope-Weir MP (1710–1791). He was cousin to Charles Hope, Lord Granton.

He studied law at St John's College, Cambridge from 1801 and entered Lincoln's Inn to train as a barrister. He was called to the bar in 1820 but never practised. At Cambridge he and George Pryme became lifelong friends.

== Career ==
In 1811, on the death of his father, he inherited the Craigiehall estate near Linlithgow and the Blackhall estate near Lanark, totalling 8000 acres in all. He employed the Edinburgh architect Thomas Brown to extend the house but did not execute his plans. In 1828 new plans were drawn by William Burn for a north wing and this time were carried out.

From 1823 he corresponded with the historian John Philip Wood.

In 1829 he was elected a Fellow of the Royal Society of Edinburgh. His proposer was Thomas Allan. However, he does not appear to have made any active contributions to the society.

In November 1830 he became MP for Ilchester at a by-election but held the seat for less than a year. Ilchester is typically remote from his own home and reflects a long-standing disconnection between members of Parliament and the constituents whom they represent. In the 1831 election he stood unopposed for the seat at Newport (Isle of Wight) but (partly due to his physical absence, was wrongly recorded in the returns as John James Hope. There is no record of him ever going to either Ilchester or Newport, but that was not a requirement of the day. He stood unsuccessfully against his cousin Sir Alexander Hope for his home seat of Linlithgowshire in 1832.

== Personal life ==
In 1813 he married Lady Elizabeth Hay, daughter of George Hay, 7th Marquess of Tweeddale. Her sister, Lady Julia Hay, married the radical John Cam Hobhouse. Together, James and Elizabeth had six daughters and two sons.

- Harriet Hope-Vere (1819–1883), who married Sir Edward Gooch, 6th Baronet, in 1839.
- Jane Hope-Vere (1821–1890), who married John Loftus, 3rd Marquess of Ely, in 1844.
- William Edward Hope-Vere (1824–1872), who inherited his various Scottish estates; he married Lady Mary Emily Boyle, daughter of Charles Boyle, Viscount Dungarvan (eldest son and heir apparent of the 8th Earl of Cork).
- Charles Hope-Vere (1828–1900), who inherited £8,000, a considerable sum at that time; he married Julia Craigie-Halkett, daughter of Maj.-Gen. John Craigie-Halkett.

He died at his house on Park Lane in Mayfair in London on 19 May 1843.
