= John Loftus, 2nd Marquess of Ely =

Anglo-Irish politician

The Most Honourable The Marquess of Ely KP
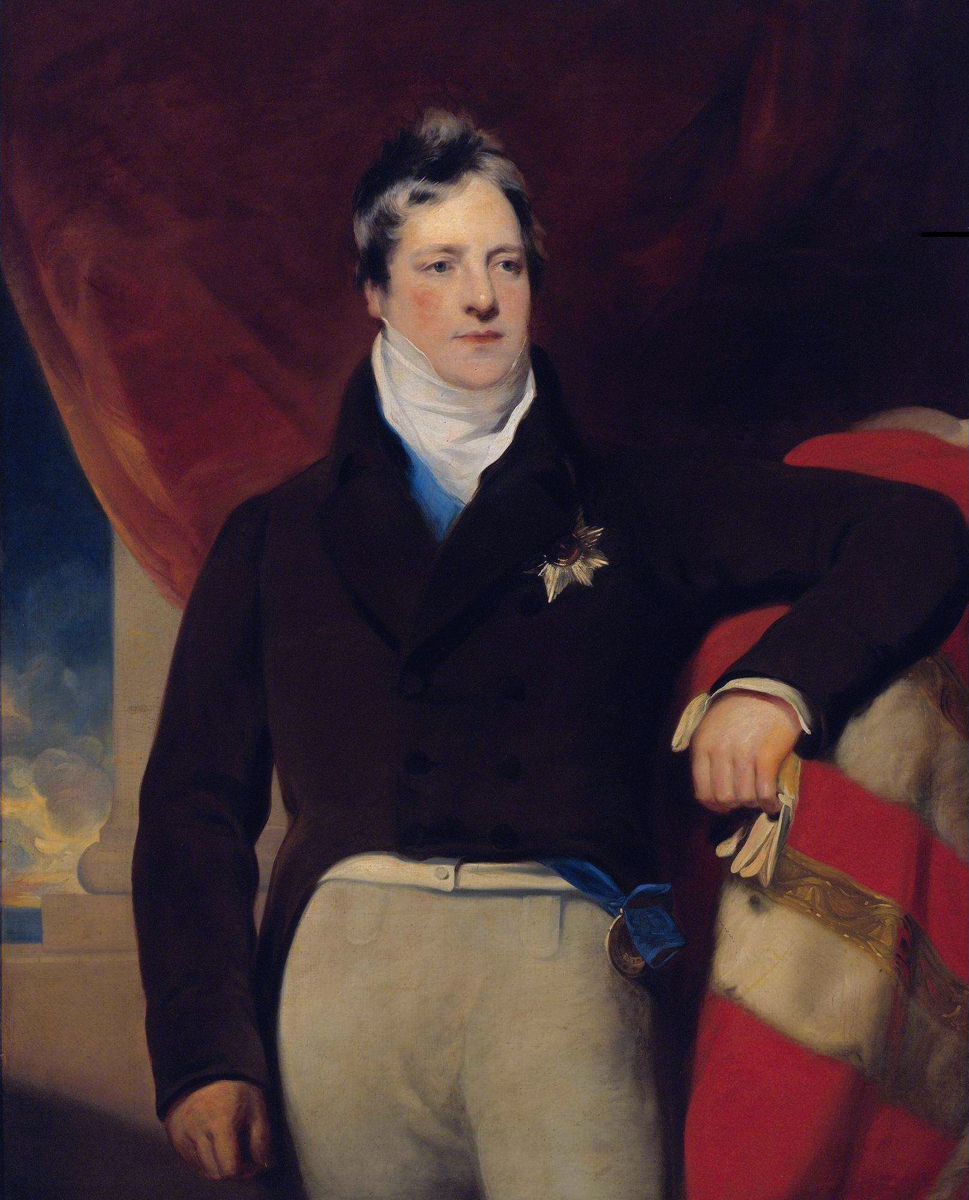
- Portrait by Sir Thomas Lawrence
- Other titles: Viscount Loftus, Knight of the Order of St Patrick
- Born: 15 February 1770
- Died: 26 September 1845 (aged 75)
- Offices: Member of Parliament for County Wexford (1790-1801); Lord of the Treasury for Ireland; Governor of County Wexford; Custos Rotulorum of County Wexford
- Noble family: Loftus; Beatrix Lucia Catherine Tollemache (grandchild)
- Issue: 11 including John Loftus, 3rd Marquess of Ely; Lord Augustus Loftus; Lord Henry Loftus
- Parents: Charles Loftus, 1st Marquess of Ely

John Loftus, 2nd Marquess of Ely KP (né Tottenham; 15 February 1770 – 26 September 1845), styled The Honourable John Loftus from 1785 to 1794 and Viscount Loftus from 1794 to 1806, was an Anglo-Irish politician who held Irish and British peerages.

== Early life ==
He was the son of Charles Loftus, 1st Marquess of Ely and Jane Myhill.

== Career ==
Loftus sat in the Irish House of Commons for County Wexford from 1790 until the Act of Union in 1801. He then represented County Wexford in the Parliament of the United Kingdom until 1806, when he succeeded his father as 2nd Marquess of Ely and 2nd Baron Loftus. He was Governor of County Wexford from 1805 and Custos Rotulorum of County Wexford from 1824.

On 3 November 1807, he was appointed a Knight of the Order of St Patrick. From 1800 to 1806, he was a Lord of the Treasury for Ireland.

== Marriage and issue ==
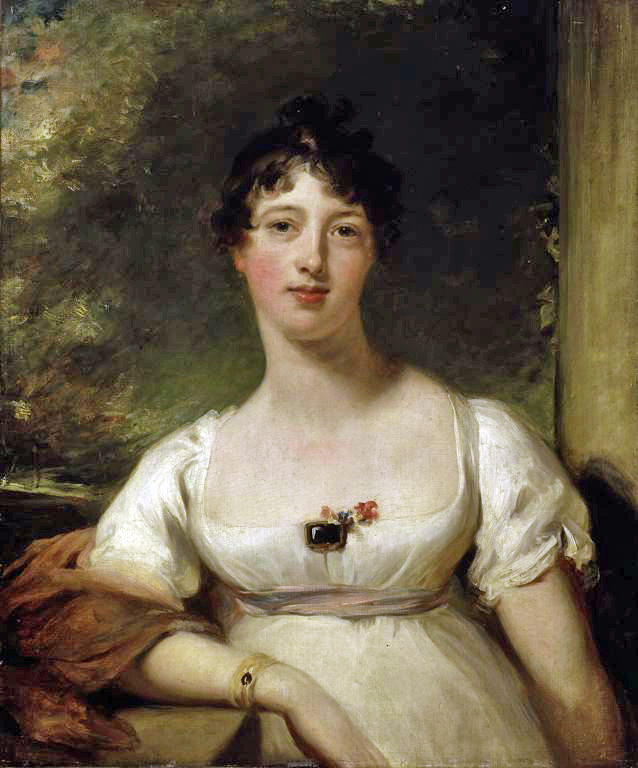
Anna Maria Dashwood by Sir Thomas Lawrence, c. 1805

Loftus married Anna Maria Dashwood, the daughter of Sir Henry Watkin Dashwood, 3rd Baronet, on 22 May 1810 at St George's Hanover Square. They had 11 children, of whom five sons and three daughters survived to adulthood.

- Lady Charlotte Elizabeth (22 April 1811 – 4 September 1878), married William Tatton Egerton, 1st Baron Egerton
- Henry Robert, Viscount Loftus (15 March 1813 – 15 April 1813), died at four weeks
- John Henry, 3rd Marquess of Ely (19 January 1814 – 15 July 1857), married in 1844 Jane Hope-Vere
- Lord George William (11 May 1815 – 19 January 1877), married Martha Fuller
- Rev. Lord Adam (13 May 1816 – 25 December 1866), Rector of Magheraculmoney, married Margaret Fannin, father of 5th and 6th Marquesses of Ely
- Lady Anna Maria Helen (5 March 1819 – 27 December 1896), died unmarried
- Lord Augustus William Frederick Spencer Loftus (1817–1904)
- Lord Henry Yorke Astley Loftus (1822–1880), married Louisa Emma, Dowager Countess of Seafield (née Maunsell), widow of 6th Earl of Seafield
- Lady Caroline Louisa (23 March 1824 – 26 March 1825), died young
- Lady Elizabeth Caroline (8 July 1826 – 3 October 1836), died young
- Lady Catherine Henrietta Mary (29 April 1828 – 22 February 1908), married cousin Capt. Arthur John Loftus, Keeper of the Jewel House at the Tower of London

Parliament of Ireland
Preceded by Vesey Colclough; George Ogle	Member of Parliament for County Wexford; 1790 – 1801; With: George Ogle 1790–1797; Abel Ram 1798–1801	Succeeded by Parliament of the United Kingdom
Parliament of the United Kingdom
Preceded by Parliament of Ireland	Member of Parliament for County Wexford; 1801 – 1806; Served alongside: Abel Ram	Succeeded by Caesar Colclough; John Colclough
Peerage of Ireland
Preceded by Charles Loftus	Marquess of Ely; 1806–1845	Succeeded by John Loftus
Peerage of the United Kingdom
Preceded by Charles Loftus	Baron Loftus; 1806–1845	Succeeded by John Loftus
