= George Hay, 8th Marquess of Tweeddale =

British soldier

Field Marshal The Most Honourable The Marquess of Tweeddale KT GCB
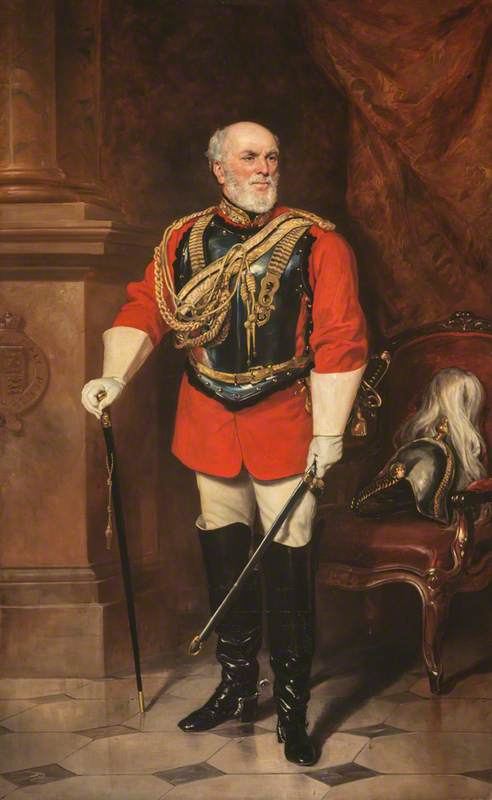
- The 8th Marquess of Tweeddale
- Born: 1 February 1787; Bonnington, Scotland
- Died: 10 October 1876 (aged 89); Yester, Scotland
- Burial place: Yester, Scotland
- Military career
- Allegiance: United Kingdom
- Branch: British Army
- Service years: 1804–1848
- Rank: Field Marshal
- Commands: Madras Army
- Conflicts: Napoleonic Wars; Peninsular War; Battle of Bussaco (WIA); Battle of Vitoria (WIA); War of 1812

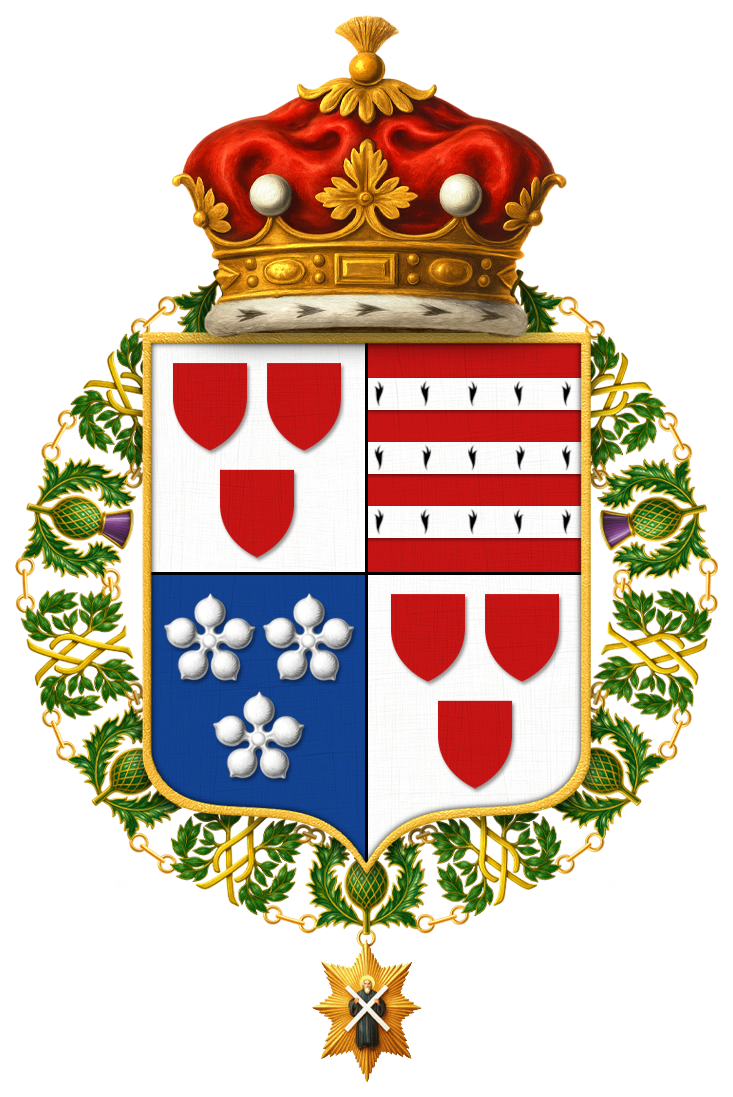
Shield of Arms of George Hay, 8th Marquess of Tweeddale, KT, GCB

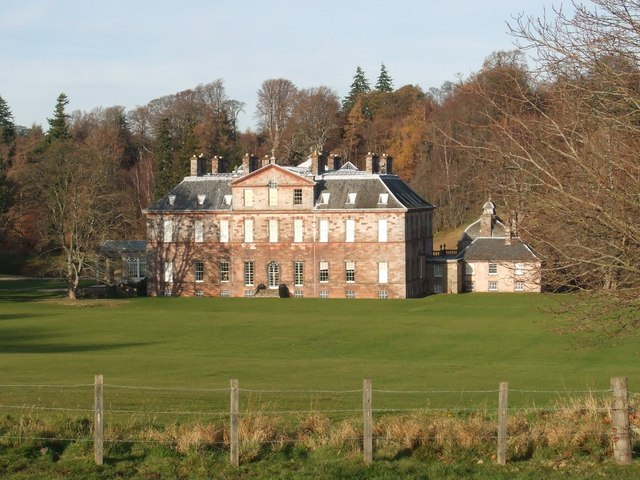
Yester House

Field Marshal George Hay, 8th Marquess of Tweeddale, KT, GCB (1 February 1787 – 10 October 1876), Hereditary Chamberlain of Dunfermline, was a British soldier and administrator. He served as a staff officer in the Peninsular War under Arthur Wellesley and was with Wellesley at the Second Battle of Porto when they crossed the Douro river and routed Marshal Soult's French troops in Porto. Hay also saw action at the Battle of Bussaco and at the Battle of Vitoria. He later served in the War of 1812 and commanded the 100th Regiment of Foot at the Battle of Chippawa when he was taken prisoner of war. He went on to become governor of Madras and, at the same time, Commander-in-Chief of the Madras Army, in which role he restored the discipline of the army, which had been allowed to fall into a relaxed state.

== Life and military career ==
Born at Yester House the eldest son of George Hay, 7th Marquess of Tweeddale and Lady Hannah Charlotte Maitland (a daughter of James Maitland, 7th Earl of Lauderdale), Hay was educated at the Royal High School in Edinburgh and commissioned as an ensign in the 52nd Light Infantry in June 1804. After succeeding to his father's title as Marquess of Tweeddale in August 1804, he was promoted to lieutenant on 12 October 1804 and, having received his first training under Sir John Moore at Shorncliffe, he served as an aide-de-camp in Sicily in 1806. He transferred to the Grenadier Guards with the rank of lieutenant in the regiment and captain in the Army on 12 May 1807.

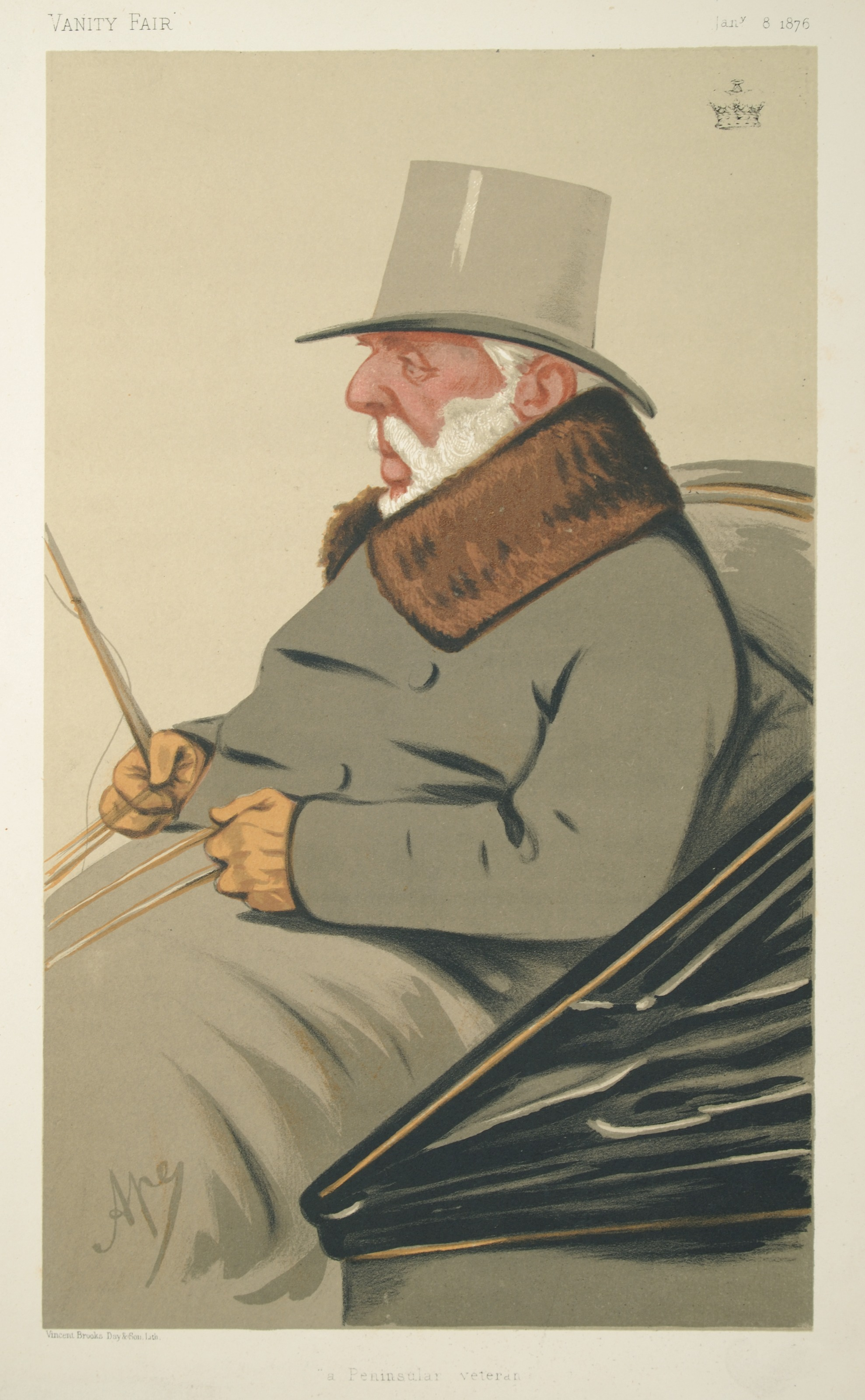
Caricature of George Hay, 8th Marquess of Tweeddale driving a coach

Hay served as a staff officer in the Peninsular War under Arthur Wellesley. Hay was with Wellesley at the Second Battle of Porto in May 1809 when they crossed the Douro river in a daylight coup de main and routed Marshal Soult's French troops in Porto. He was deputy assistant quartermaster general and was wounded at the Battle of Bussaco in September 1810 and, having been promoted to major in the 41st Regiment of Foot, he was assistant quartermaster general at the Battle of Vitoria in June 1813. He was immediately promoted to lieutenant colonel.

Hay also served in the War of 1812 between Britain and America, and commanded the 100th Regiment of Foot at the Battle of Chippawa in July 1814. As the redcoats of the 1/1st (Royal Scots) Foot and 100th Regiments moved forward, their own artillery had to stop firing in order to avoid hitting them. Meanwhile, the American gunners switched from firing roundshot to firing canister, with lethal consequences for the British infantry. Once the opposing lines had closed to less than 100 yards apart, General Winfield Scott of the United States Army advanced his wings, forming his brigade into a "U" shape which allowed his flanking units to catch the British advancing troops in a heavy crossfire. Hay made an attempt to fight to the death but was taken prisoner of war by the Americans. He was appointed Companion of the Order of the Bath in 1815. After the War he returned to Scotland and improved his family estate at Yester. From 1818 to 1820 he served as Pro-Grand Master of the Grand Lodge of Scotland. He was elected a representative peer for Scotland in July 1818, appointed Knight of the Thistle in 1820 and became Lord Lieutenant of East Lothian in February 1823. He was also promoted to colonel on 27 May 1825 and to major-general on 10 May 1837. Meanwhile, on his estate, he developed an improved method of making tiles for draining which was patented in October 1839.

In 1842 Hay returned to public service when he was appointed governor of Madras and also, by special arrangement of the Duke of Wellington, Commander-in-Chief of the Madras Army. In that role he restored the discipline of the army, which had been allowed to fall into a relaxed state. Promoted to lieutenant general on 9 November 1846, he retired from active service and returned to his estate in Scotland again in 1848. He was promoted to full general on 20 June 1854 and invited to join a Royal Commission established in July 1858 to inquire into the organization of the army then serving under the East India Company. He was advanced to Knight Commander of the Order of the Bath on 9 November 1862 and to Knight Grand Cross of the Order of the Bath on 13 March 1867 before being further promoted to field marshal on 29 May 1875.

Hay also served as colonel of the 30th Regiment of Foot, then of the 42nd Regiment of Foot and finally of the 2nd Regiment of Life Guards. A strong man, he once drove the mail coach from London to Haddington without a halt or a rest. He died, following injuries sustained during a fire at his home, at Yester House on 10 October 1876 and was buried in the family burial vault at the Church of St. Cuthbert at Yester in Scotland.

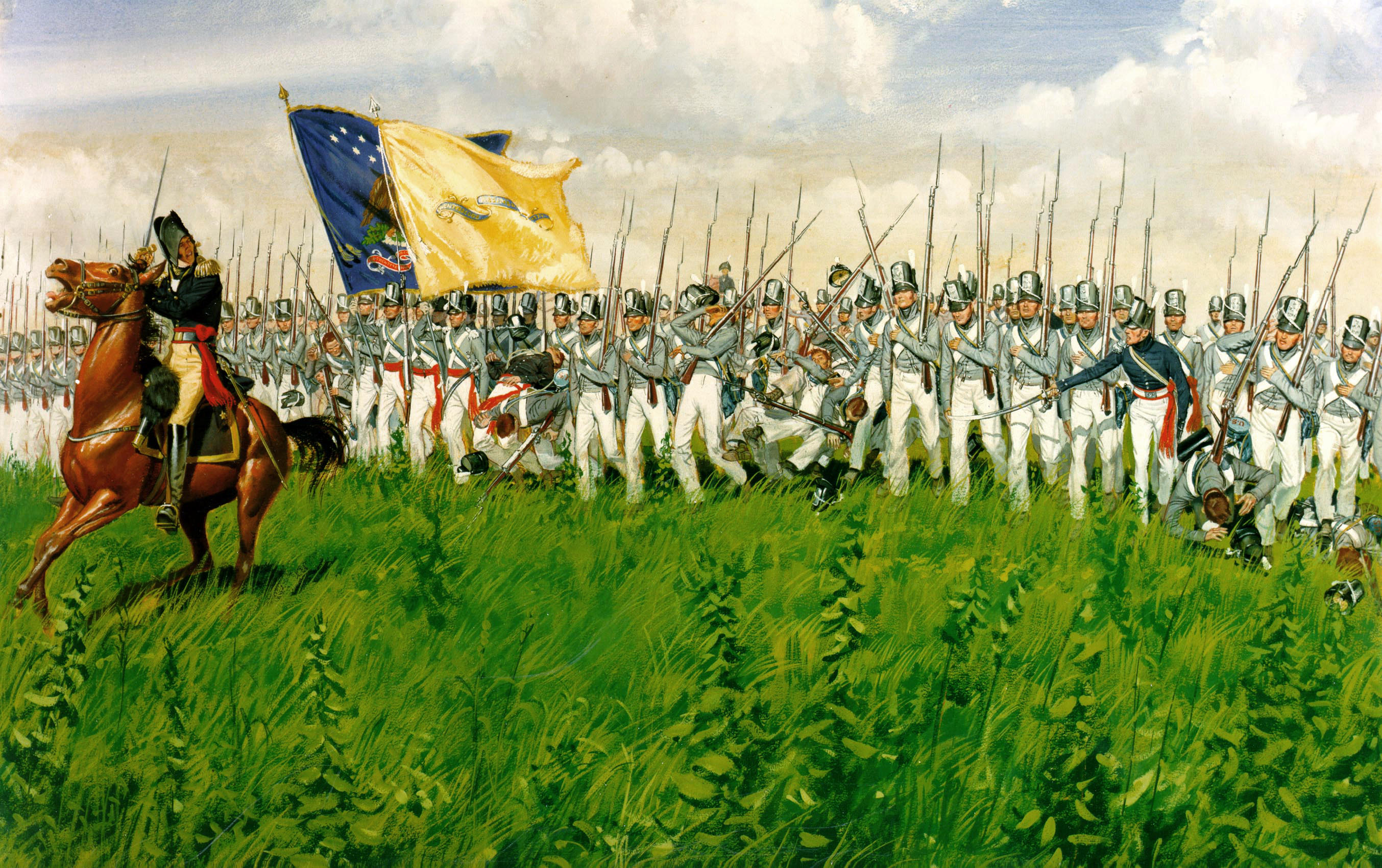
The Battle of Chippawa, at which Hay was taken prisoner of war, during the War of 1812

== Family ==
In 1816 he married Lady Susan Montagu, a daughter of the 5th Duke of Manchester: they had six sons and eight daughters:

- Lady Susan Georgiana Hay (13 March 1817 – 6 May 1853), married the 1st Marquess of Dalhousie and had issue
- Lady Hannah Charlotte Hay (12 Apr 1818 – 10 November 1887), married Simon Watson Taylor and had issue
- Lady Louisa Jane (29 Jul 1819 – 9 September 1882), married Robert Ramsay and had issue
- Lady Elizabeth (27 September 1820 – 13 August 1904), married the 2nd Duke of Wellington
- George, Earl of Gifford (22 April 1822 – 22 December 1862)
- Lady Millicent (1823–1826), died young
- Lord Arthur, later Earl of Gifford and later 9th Marquess of Tweeddale (9 November 1824 – 29 December 1878)
- Lord William Montagu, later 10th Marquess of Tweeddale (27 January 1826 – 25 November 1911)
- Lord John (23 August 1827 – 4 May 1916)
- Lady Jane (1830 – 13 December 1920), married Sir Richard Taylor and had issue
- Lady Julia (1831–1915)
- Lord Charles Edward (1833–1912)
- Lord Frederick (1835–1912)
- Lady Emily (1836 – 4 April 1924), married Sir Robert Peel, 3rd Baronet and had issue

== Sources ==
- Elting, John R (1995). Amateurs to Arms: A military history of the war of 1812. New York: Da Capo Press. ISBN 0-306-80653-3.
- Heathcote, Tony (1999). The British Field Marshals, 1736–1997: A Biographical Dictionary. Barnsley: Leo Cooper. ISBN 0-85052-696-5.

Masonic offices
Preceded by Sir John Marjoribanks, Bt	Pro-Grand Master of the Grand Lodge of Scotland; 1818–1820	Succeeded by The Duke of Hamilton (as Grand Master)
Political offices
Preceded by The Lord Elphinstone	Governor of Madras; 1842–1848	Succeeded by Henry Pottinger
Military offices
Preceded by Sir Samuel Whittingham	C-in-C, Madras Army (while serving as Governor); 1842–1848	Succeeded by Sir George Berkeley
Preceded by Sir Thomas Bradford	Colonel of the 30th Regiment of Foot; 1846–1862	Succeeded by Thomas Wright
Preceded by Sir James Douglas	Colonel of the 42nd Regiment of Foot; 1862–1863	Succeeded by Sir Duncan Cameron
Preceded by The Earl Beauchamp	Colonel of the 2nd Life Guards; 1863–1876	Succeeded by The Viscount Templetown
Honorary titles
Preceded by The 8th Earl of Haddington	Lord Lieutenant of East Lothian; 1823–1876	Succeeded by The 11th Earl of Haddington
Peerage of Scotland
Preceded by George Hay	Marquess of Tweeddale; 1804–1876	Succeeded by Arthur Hay
