= Lord Henry Loftus =

Irish cricketer

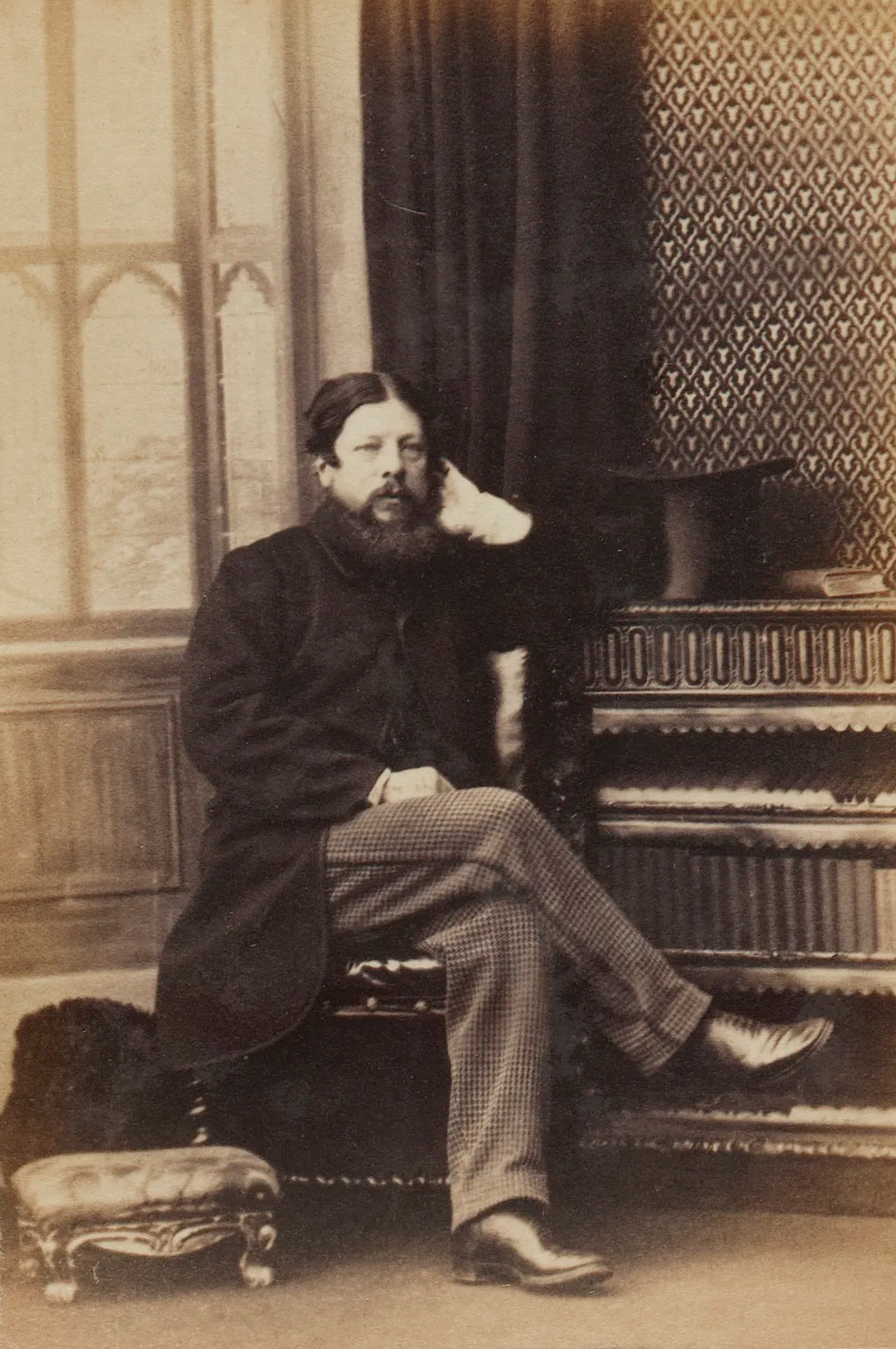
- Portrait by Camille Silvy, 1860

Personal information
- Full name: Henry Yorke Astley Loftus
- Born: 9 April 1822; Kilbride, Ireland
- Died: 28 February 1880 (aged 57); Shepherd's Bush, Middlesex, England
- Batting: Unknown
- Relatives: Charles Loftus, 1st Marquess of Ely (grandfather); John Loftus, 2nd Marquess of Ely (father); John Loftus, 3rd Marquess of Ely (brother); Jane Hope-Vere (sister in law); Lord Augustus Loftus (brother); Beatrix Lucia Catherine Tollemache (niece)

Domestic team information
- Years: Team
- 1841–1842: Oxford University
- 1841–1842: Marylebone Cricket Club

Career statistics
Competition	First-class
Matches	5
Runs scored	21
Batting average	3.50
100s/50s	–/–
Top score	18
Catches/stumpings	4/–
- Source: Cricinfo, 20 February 2020

Lord Henry Yorke Astley Loftus (9 April 1822 – 28 February 1880) was an Irish first-class cricketer.

The son of the politician John Loftus, 2nd Marquess of Ely and Anna Maria Dashwood, he was born at Kilbride in Ireland. He was educated in England at Harrow School, matriculating at Oriel College, Oxford in 1840, and graduating B.A. in 1843. While studying at Oxford, he played first-class cricket for Oxford University, making his debut against Cambridge University in The University Match of 1841, with Loftus making a further appearance in 1841 for Oxford against the Marylebone Cricket Club (MCC). Loftus also played for the MCC against Cambridge Town Club at Lord's in that same season, before making to further first-class appearances in 1842, playing once each for Oxford and the MCC. He scored just 21 runs in his five first-class matches, with a high score of 18. Loftus later served in the Wexford Militia, being commissioned as a captain in December 1854. He was declared bankrupt in 1866 and 1873. Loftus died in England at Shepherd's Bush in February 1880, without issue.
