= Custos Rotulorum of County Wexford =

Former civic role in Ireland

The Custos Rotulorum of County Wexford was the highest civil officer in County Wexford.

== Incumbents ==
- ?–?1783 Henry Loftus, 1st Earl of Ely (died 1783)
- 1807–?1824 Sir Frederick Flood, 1st Baronet (died 1824)
- 1824-?1845 John Loftus, 2nd Marquess of Ely (died 1845)
- 1845–1858 James Stopford, 4th Earl of Courtown

For later custodes rotulorum, see Lord Lieutenant of Wexford
