= Lord Augustus Loftus =

British diplomat and colonial administrator (1817–1904)

The Right Honourable Lord Augustus Loftus GCB
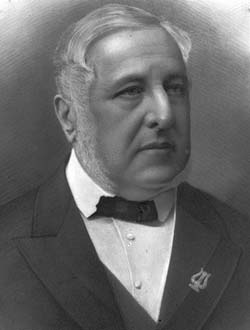
- Lord Augustus Loftus by unknown photographer

15th Governor of New South Wales
- In office 4 August 1879 – 9 November 1885
- Monarch: Victoria
- Preceded by: Hercules Robinson
- Succeeded by: The Lord Carrington

Personal details
- Born: Lord Augustus William Frederick Spencer Loftus; 4 October 1817 Bristol, England
- Died: 7 March 1904 (aged 86) Surrey, England
- Spouse: Emma Maria Greville (m. 1845)
- Relations: John Loftus, 3rd Marquess of Ely (brother); Lord Henry Loftus (brother); Beatrix Lucia Catherine Tollemache (niece)
- Children: 5

Lord Augustus William Frederick Spencer Loftus (4 October 1817 – 7 March 1904) was a British diplomat and colonial administrator. He was Ambassador to Prussia from 1865 to 1868, to the North German Confederation from 1868 to 1871 and to the Russian Empire from 1871 to 1879 and Governor of New South Wales from 1879 to 1885.

== Background ==
Loftus was born in Bristol, England, the fourth son of John Loftus, 2nd Marquess of Ely, by Anna Maria Dashwood, daughter of Sir Henry Dashwood, 3rd Baronet. He was privately educated.

== Career ==
Loftus was appointed by Lord Palmerston to the diplomatic service in 1837 as attaché at Berlin. He was attaché at Stuttgart in 1844. He was secretary to Sir Stratford Canning in 1848, and after serving as secretary of legation at Stuttgart (1852), and Berlin (1853), was envoy at Vienna (1858), Berlin (1860) and Munich (1862).

He was subsequently Ambassador at Berlin from 1865 to 1868, to the North German Confederation from 1868 to 1871 and to Saint Petersburg from 1871 to 1879.

He then served as Governor of New South Wales from 1879 to 1885. He was appointed a Knight Grand Cross of the Order of the Bath in 1866 and sworn of the Privy Council in 1868.

== Marriage and issue ==
Loftus married a distant cousin, Emma Maria Greville, daughter of Vice-Admiral Henry Francis Greville, in 1845. They had three sons and two surviving daughters. One of their sons would have succeeded George Loftus, 7th Marquess of Ely (1903–1969) as the 8th Marquess of Ely, but all three predeceased their cousin.

- Unnamed daughter (17 August 1846), stillborn at Baden-Baden
- Evelyn Ann Frances Loftus (4 December 1847 – 28 September 1861), died at Baden-Baden aged 13
- Henry John Loftus (8 November 1849 – 4 October 1924), married Sarah Josephine Leech, daughter of William Leech of Philadelphia
- Capt. Augustus Petham Brooke Loftus (6 July 1851 – 15 July 1932), married in 1885 Ethel Adelaïde Labertouche, daughter of Peter Paul Labertouche; had one son:
  - Guy Alvo Greville Loftus (26 August 1899 – 7 August 1965), heir presumptive to the Marquessate of Ely from 1935 until his death
- Emma Anne Caroline Bloomfield Loftus (15 February 1855 – 21 August 1937); married first in 1873 Hon. Frederick Arthur Wellesley, son of Henry Wellesley, 1st Earl Cowley (divorced 1882); married second in 1903 Lebrecht von Köller
- Montagu Egerton Loftus (22 January 1860 – 27 November 1934), married Margaret Julia Agnes Fairfax Astell (died 1900), daughter of John Harvey Astell; and secondly in 1904 Colina Marion Hale Monro

Lady Augustus died in January 1902. Loftus survived her by two years and died in Surrey, England, in March 1904, aged 86.

The town of Emmaville, New South Wales, was named after Emma in 1882.

Diplomatic posts
Preceded by Sir George Hamilton Seymour	British Ambassador to Austria; 1858–1860	Succeeded by The Lord Bloomfield
Preceded by The Lord Bloomfield	British Minister to Prussia; 1860–1862	Succeeded by Andrew Buchanan
Preceded by John Milbanke	British Minister to Bavaria; 1862–1866	Succeeded by Sir Henry Howard
Preceded by The Lord Napier	British Ambassador to Prussia (to the North German Confederation 1868–71); 1866–1871	Succeeded by The Lord Ampthill (as Ambassador to the German Empire)
Preceded by George Vane	British Ambassador to Russia; 1871–1879	Succeeded by The Lord Dufferin and Claneboye
Government offices
Preceded by Hercules Robinson	Governor of New South Wales; 1879–1885	Succeeded by The Lord Carrington
