= Wood's despatch =

1854 British letter on English use in India

Wood's Despatch
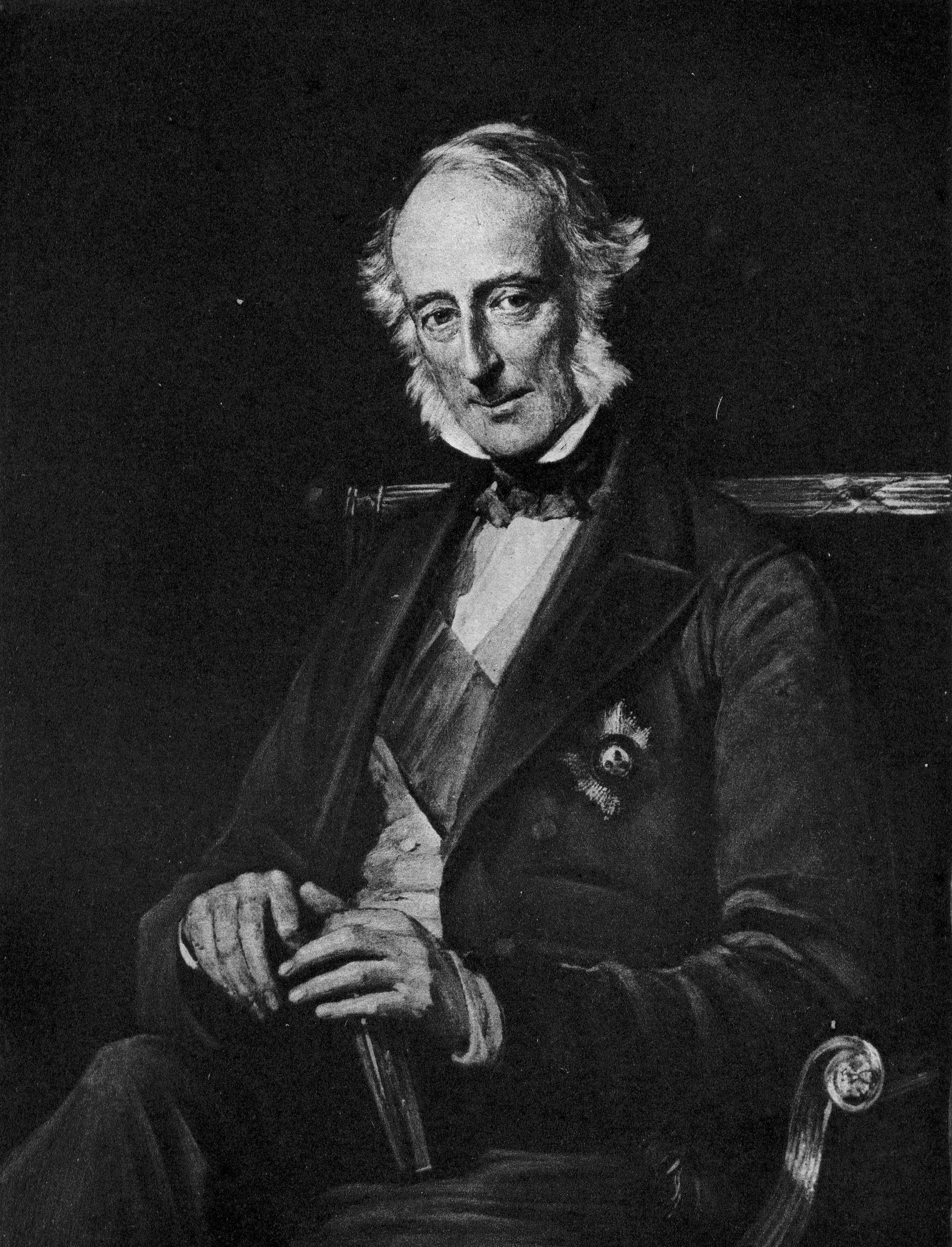
- Sir Charles Wood, G.C.B., 1st Viscount Halifax (1800-1885)
- Created: 19 July 1854
- Commissioned by: President of the Board of Control of India
- Author: Sir Charles Wood
- Media type: Communiqué
- Subject: Education
- Purpose: To hasten the development of education in British India

Full text
- The Despatch of 1854, on General Education in India at Wikisource

Wood's despatch is the informal fundamental name for a formal despatch that was sent by Sir Charles Wood, the President of the Board of Control of the British East India Company to Lord Dalhousie, the Governor-General of India. Wood's communique suggested a major shift to popularising the use of English within India. As for the language of instruction, Wood recommended that primary schools adopt vernacular languages, for secondary schools to adopt both English and vernacular languages and for colleges to adopt English.

The letter played an important role in spreading English-language learning and female education in British India. One of the most favourable steps taken was to create an English-speaking class among the Indian people to be used as a workforce in the company's administration. Vocational and women's education also became more heavily emphasised.

This period of time in the British Raj was part of a final phase in which the British government administration brought social reforms to India. The governing policies later tended to become more reactionary, notably in the wake of major social and political unrest surrounding the Indian Rebellion of 1857.

== Background ==
The East India Company (EIC) largely ignored development of education in India until the mid-19th century. Some of its members thought that they should transform India into a civilised society and convert the Indian mindset by making rapid changes. Others thought that it was best to educate Indians and recruit them in Indian Civil Services (ICS). By learning English, Indians would adopt British rule. Those were some of the reasons that the EIC wanted Indians to learn English. Lord Macaulay said, "We (Britishers) should try to create a class of people, who would work as translators between the people who we are ruling and us, even though they may look like Indians by color; but their likes and dislikes, morals and thinking will be like an Englishman".

== Recommendations ==
Wood's recommendations were the following:

1. English-language education would enhance the moral character of Indians and thus supply the East India Company with civil servants who could be trusted.
2. A separate education department should be set up in every province to run the schools properly and for the advancement of education system.
3. Universities on the model of the University of London be established in large cities such as Bombay, Calcutta and Madras.
4. At least one government school should be opened in every district.
5. Affiliated private schools should be given grants in aid.
6. Indian natives should be given training in their mother tongue as well.
7. Provision should be made for a systematic method of education from the primary to the university levels.
8. The government should support education for women.
9. The medium of instruction at the primary level should be the vernacular but at the higher levels should be English.
10. The training of teachers at all levels should be promoted and stressed and for this purpose, training schools of teachers should be established.
11. The government schools and colleges ought to be renovated.
12. Secular education is to be promoted.

== Measures taken ==
After Wood's despatch, several measures were taken by the East India Company:

1. New institutions were set up like the University of Calcutta, the University of Bombay and the University of Madras in 1857, as well as the University of the Punjab in 1882 and the University of Allahabad in 1887. It is stated that universities are based on the University of London. These universities wouldn't offer any teaching programs; they would instead serve as examining and degree-granting institutions.
2. In all provinces, education departments were set up.
3. English-language education was promoted within academics and the bureaucracies of companies and public services.

== Consequences ==
Merits:

According to the recommendations of Sir Charles Wood-

1. three universities were established in Kolkata, Bombay and Madras in 1857. # Later on two more universities were founded in Lahore and Allahabad.
2. The education department or Directorate of Public Instruction was established in 1855.
3. The number of primary schools all over India increased from 3916 in 1881-82 to 5124 in 1900-02.
4. The Indian Education Service was formed in 1896 to conduct the 4 administrative activities in the field of d education.
5. The Hunter Commission (1882- of 83), the Raleigh Commission (1902-04) and the Sadler Commission (1917-19) were set up with the purpose of expanding education.

Demerits :

1. Since the western education schemes were mainly confined to the cities the villages were deprived of its benefits. #As the western education was mainly imparted through the medium of English the common people of India did not show much interest in it.

== Sources ==
- Bayly, Christopher Alan (1987), Indian Society and the Making of the British Empire, The New Cambridge History of India, vol. II.1, Cambridge University Press, ISBN 978-0-521-38650-0.
