= Jane Loftus, Marchioness of Ely =

English lady of the bedchamber and close friend of Queen Victoria

The Most Honourable The Marchioness of Ely
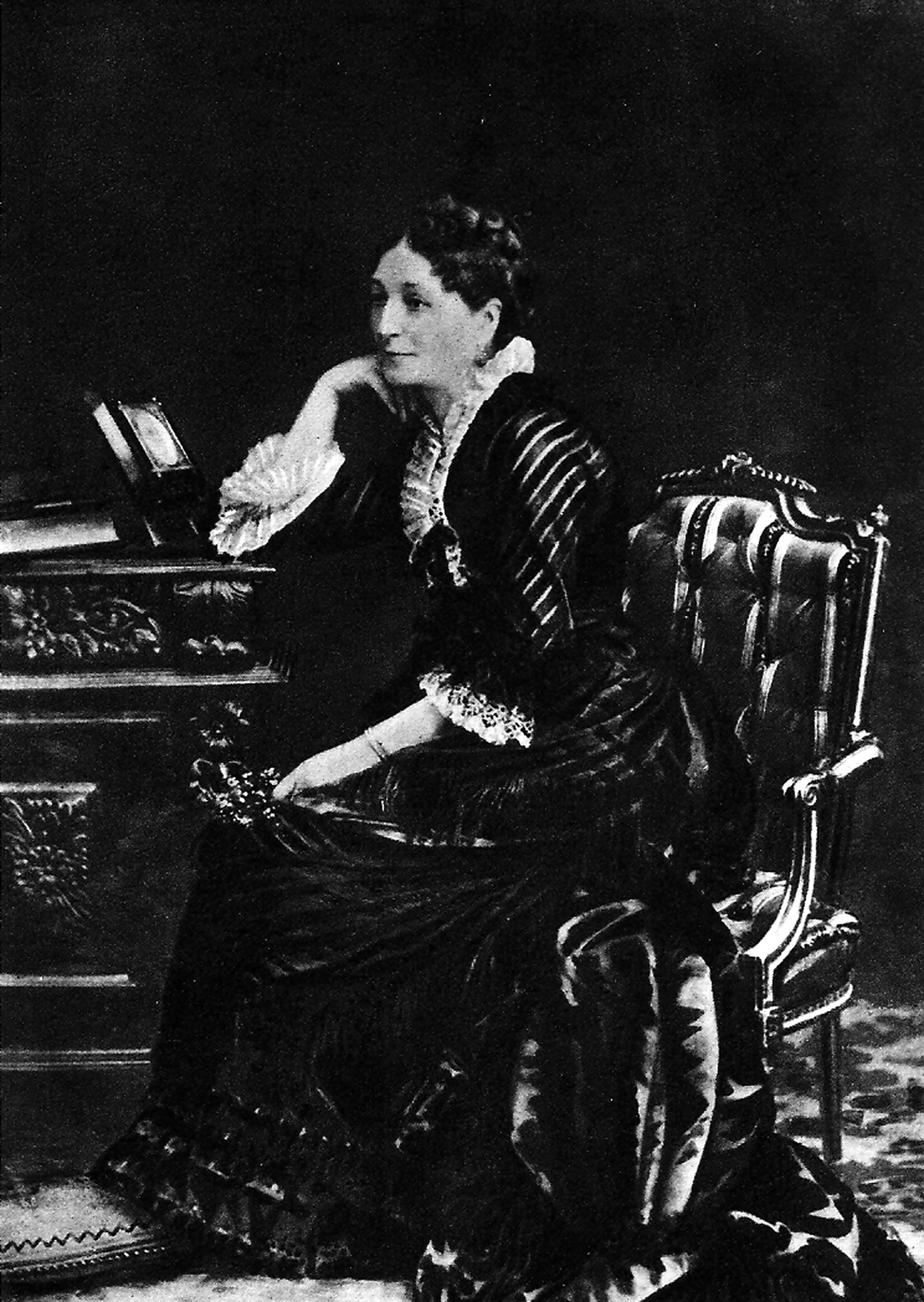
- Jane, Lady Ely

Personal details
- Born: Jane Hope-Vere; 3 December 1821
- Died: 11 July 1890 (aged 68) 22 Wilton Place, Knightsbridge, London, England
- Resting place: Kensal Green Cemetery, London, England
- Spouse: John Loftus, 3rd Marquess of Ely (m. 1844)
- Relations: George Hay, 7th Marquess of Tweeddale (grandfather); Elizabeth Wellesley, Duchess of Wellington (cousin)
- Parents: James Hope-Vere; Lady Elizabeth Hay

Jane Loftus, Marchioness of Ely (née Hope-Vere; 3 December 1821 – 11 June 1890) was an English lady of the bedchamber and a close friend of Queen Victoria. Her parents were James Hope-Vere and Lady Elizabeth Hay, and through her mother she was a cousin of Arthur Wellesley, the first Duke of Wellington. After her marriage to John Loftus, the third Marquess of Ely, she developed friendships with Queen Sophie of the Netherlands and the Empress Eugénie. Jane arrived at court as a Lady of the Bedchamber in 1851, and despite her own nervousness and lack of discretion, she became a close companion of Queen Victoria until her resignation in 1889. Her service was marred by her constant illnesses and fear of the Queen, but she proved a loyal and devoted servant, deferring to her royal mistress in all matters. Jane died on 11 June 1890 and is buried at Kensal Green cemetery in London.

== Early life ==
Jane was the daughter of James Hope-Vere, Member of Parliament for Ilchester, and Lady Elizabeth Hay, daughter of George Hay, 7th Marquess of Tweeddale. Her father was a descendant of the Marquess of Linlithgow.

Through her cousin Elizabeth Wellesley, Duchess of Wellington, she became a friend of Arthur Wellesley, the first Duke of Wellington.

On 29 October 1844, Jane married John Loftus, the third Marquess of Ely, and the couple spent much of their time on Ely's Irish estates, such as Loftus Hall in County Wexford, but they also visited the continent frequently. Jane developed friends in high society, including Queen Sophie of the Netherlands and the Empress Eugénie. Jane represented Queen Victoria at the birth of Empress Eugénie's son, Napoléon, Prince Imperial.

== Attendance on Queen Victoria ==
Jane was appointed as a lady of the Queen's bedchamber on 15 July 1851. Although hard-working, loyal and devoted, she lacked the knowledge and discretion required for the role. In 1855, Mary Bulteel, later the wife of the Queen's private secretary Sir Henry Ponsonby, disapproved of Jane's conduct, and commented that “Lady E[ly]. is more utterly the reverse from what she ought to be on this occasion than anybody can possibly conceive. I mean, I see she is preparing to be foolishly cringing to all the little miseries of etiquette...I quite long for somebody as the Queen's first lady with more natural dignity”.

Despite her shortcomings, the Queen came to rely heavily on “Dearest Jane”, as she was referred to. The Queen required the utmost effort and devotion from her servants, and Jane followed this code of conduct with total deference to her royal mistress. However, her health suffered as a result, and it remained a constant burden throughout her waiting. In a letter from Henry Ponsonby to Sir Thomas Biddulph, another courtier, he reported that Jane “was principally taken up with her own health”.

Jane was also concerned about her own health, and in 1876, she confided to Ponsonby that “she cannot go on as it is, that it is killing her”, and he advised her to write to the Queen threatening to resign if her position was not made easier. The Queen relented, but continued to impose restrictions on Jane's contact with the outside world. Jane's son, who became the 4th Marquess on the death of his father in 1857, was anxious to visit, but the Queen would not allow him to. Instead, he requested an interview with Ponsonby about his mother's arduous duties; Ponsonby accepted, but Jane said “oh no, perhaps the Queen would not like it”. Ponsonby referred to this fear of the Queen as absurd, knowing that the Queen would not be angry with him for paying a visit to Jane's son.

Although her service was marred by her nervousness and taxed her health, Jane Ely quickly became one of the Queen's most trusted attendants. The Queen referred to Jane as “almost one of ourselves”, which indicates the difference that Victoria liked to maintain between herself and non-royals. Jane became the most prominent of ladies that were recognised “agents” of the Queen, the others being Harriet Phipps and Horatia Stopford. The role was exploited, especially in the royal household, where they found in Jane a useful advocate to the Queen when requesting approval for a course of action. The use of Jane as an unofficial secretary was widely acknowledged in society, and references to her are found in many letters from the aristocracy. When the Earl of Beaconsfield fell out with the Queen after he refused to meet Lord Chelmsford, he wrote despairingly to Jane, with the probable intention that she would show it to the Queen, that “I love the Queen — perhaps the only person in this world left to me that I do love; and therefore you can understand how much it worries and disquiets me, when there is a cloud between us.”

== Personal life ==
Jane's relationship with the Queen was close, but it became strained for a short period when rumours circulated that Jane was to remarry. Lord Torrington mentioned the possibility of her remarriage to Robert St Clair-Erskine, Lord Loughborough, but shortly afterwards, Jane personally denied that there was any truth in it. Other suitors included Count Cavour, the Piedmontese leader.

Following the marriage of Princess Louise, Duchess of Argyll in 1871, Jane was asked to live with the Queen on a more permanent basis. She continued to serve until April 1889, when, following the death of her only son, she wrote to the Queen tendering her resignation, reporting that “this last blow has quite crushed” her. Following her resignation, she was granted the honorary title of Extra Lady of the Bedchamber.

On 11 June 1890 she died at her home at 22 Wilton Place, Knightsbridge in London, and was interred next to her husband at Kensal Green Cemetery. The Queen was informed by a telegram from Jane's daughter, and she confided to her journal that she was “much upset. God knows what an awful loss she is to me. She was absolutely devoted to me and we were so intimate”.

== Sources ==
- Desant, Arthur Irwin, John Thadeus Delane, Editor of "The Times": His Life and Correspondence Vol. 2 (C. Scribner's Sons, 1908)
- Kennedy, A. L., ed., My dear duchess: social and political letters to the duchess of Manchester, 1858–1869 (John Murray, 1956)
- Longford, Elizabeth, Victoria R. I. (Weidenfeld & Nicolson, 1971)
- Pearson, Hesketh, Dizzy: The Life & Personality of Benjamin Disraeli, Earl of Beaconsfield (Harper, 1951)
- Ponsonby, Arthur, Henry Ponsonby, Queen Victoria's Private Secretary, His Life from His Letters (Periodicals Service Co., 1942)
