= John Loftus, 3rd Marquess of Ely =

British nobleman (1814 – 1857)

The Honourable John Loftus, 3rd Marquess of Ely

Baron Loftus

Personal details
- Born: 19 January 1814 Mayfair, London, England
- Died: 15 July 1857 (aged 43)
- Party: Conservative
- Spouse: Jane Hope-Vere (m. 1844)
- Relations: Lord Augustus Loftus (brother); Lord Henry Loftus (brother); Beatrix Lucia Catherine Tollemache (niece)
- Parent: John Loftus, 2nd Marquess of Ely
- Education: Christ Church, Oxford

John Henry Loftus, 3rd Marquess of Ely (19 January 1814 – 15 July 1857) was a British politician.

Born in Hill Street in Mayfair, Loftus studied at Christ Church, Oxford. As Viscount Loftus, he stood unsuccessfully as a Conservative Party candidate in Gloucester, at the 1841 UK general election. In 1844, he married Jane Hope-Vere.

Loftus won the 1845 Woodstock by-election, held on 1 May that year, but succeeded as the Marquess of Ely in September. Through his subsidiary title, Baron Loftus, he took a seat in the House of Lords.

Parliament of the United Kingdom
Preceded by John Spencer-Churchill	Member of Parliament for Woodstock; 1845	Succeeded by Alfred Spencer-Churchill
Peerage of Ireland
Preceded by John Loftus	Marquess of Ely; 1845–1857	Succeeded by John Loftus
Peerage of the United Kingdom
Preceded by John Loftus	Baron Loftus; 1845–1857	Succeeded by John Loftus
