= Susan Broun-Ramsay, Marchioness of Dalhousie =

The Most Honourable The Marchioness of Dalhousie
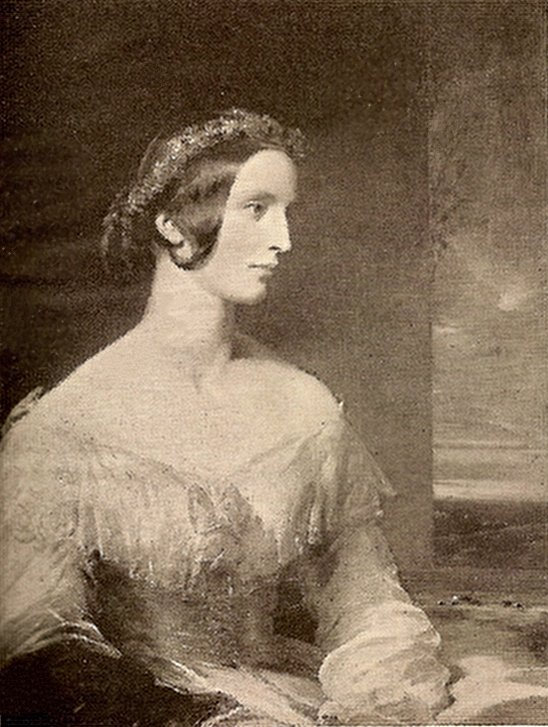
- Born: 13 March 1817
- Died: 6 May 1853 (aged 36); At sea
- Occupations: Courtier, Lady of the Bedchamber to Queen Victoria
- Spouse: James Broun-Ramsay, 1st Marquess of Dalhousie (m. 1836)
- Children: Lady Susan Broun; Lady Edith Fergusson
- Parents: George Hay, 8th Marquess of Tweeddale; Lady Susan Montagu

Susan Broun-Ramsay, Marchioness of Dalhousie (13 March 1817 – 6 May 1853), formerly Lady Susan Georgiana Hay, was the wife of James Broun-Ramsay, 1st Marquess of Dalhousie.

She was the daughter of George Hay, 8th Marquess of Tweeddale, and his wife, the former Lady Susan Montagu.

On 21 January 1836 she married James Broun-Ramsay, who became Earl of Dalhousie in 1838, making her a countess. They had two children:

- Lady Susan Georgiana Ramsay (9 January 1837 – 22 January 1898); married twice: first, to Robert Bourke, 1st Baron Connemara, from whom she was divorced in 1890, and second, to Surgn.-Lt.-Col. William Hamilton Briggs, who took the surname Broun. There were no children from either marriage.
- Lady Edith Christian Ramsay (6 October 1839 – 28 October 1871); married Sir James Fergusson, 6th Baronet, and had children.

For a period in 1842, the then-countess was a Lady of the Bedchamber to Queen Victoria, a position also held by her sister Elizabeth, whose husband was the heir to the Duke of Wellington. However, Susan was obliged to resign because of health problems.

In 1848 the earl was made Governor-General of India and Governor of Bengal, and in the following year he was elevated to the rank of marquess. He was accompanied by his wife, but her health deteriorated and in 1852 she moved to Ceylon in the hope that the climate would help. In 1853, she began the sea journey back to Britain but was taken ill and died before reaching home.

In the absence of a male heir, the marquessate lapsed after the death of James Broun-Ramsay in 1860 and the earldom passed to a nephew.
