= George Hay, 7th Marquess of Tweeddale =

Bombay Marine officer (1753–1804)

The Most Honourable The Marquess of Tweeddale DL
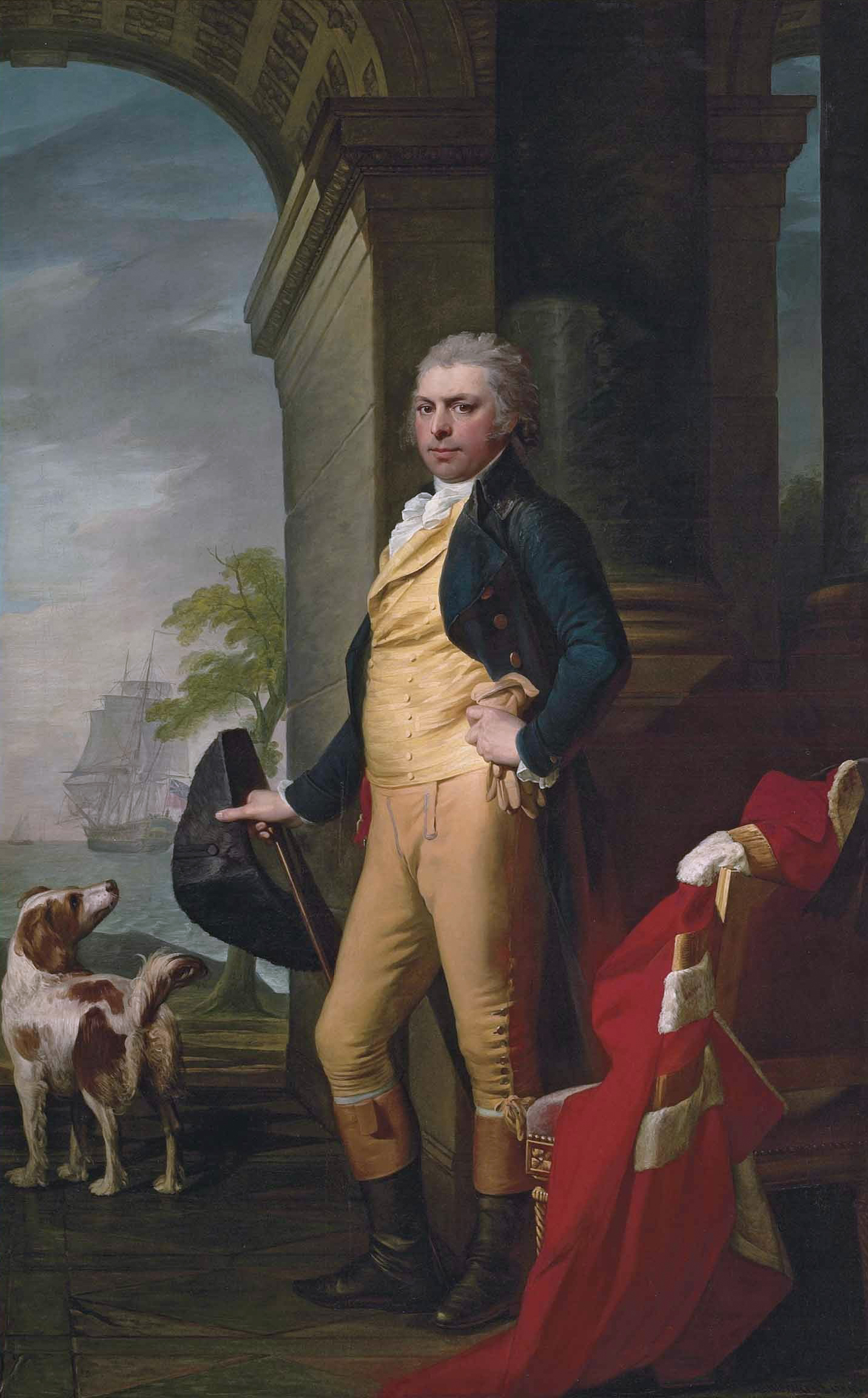
- Portrait by Jean-Laurent Mosnier, 1794

Lord Lieutenant of Haddingtonshire
- In office 1794–1804
- Preceded by: Office established
- Succeeded by: The Earl of Haddington

Personal details
- Born: 1753 East Lothian, Scotland
- Died: 8 August 1804 (aged 50–51) Verdun, France
- Spouse: Lady Hannah Maitland (m. 1785; died 1804)
- Children: 11

Military service
- Allegiance: East India Company
- Branch/service: Bombay Marine

George Hay, 7th Marquess of Tweeddale, DL (1753 – 9 August 1804) was a Bombay Marine officer who served as the Lord Lieutenant of Haddingtonshire from 1794 to 1804.

== Early life ==
Hay was born at Newhall in East Lothian, Scotland. He was the son of John Hay (d. 1765) and Dorothy (née Hayhurst) Hay (d. 1808). His siblings included William Hay (who married Lady Catherine Hay, a daughter of the 4th Marquess of Tweeddale), Edward Hay-Mackenzie of Newhall (who married Hon. Maria Murray-Mackenzie, a daughter of the 6th Lord Elibank), Dorothea Hay (who married James Hay), and Margaret Hay (who married Allan Macdougall of Gallanach).

His maternal grandfather was John Hayhurst, a labourer who lived at Quernmore, Lancaster. His paternal grandparents were Brig.-Gen. Lord William Hay, of Newham and Margaret Hay (daughter of John Hay of Linplum and granddaughter of Sir James Hay, 1st Baronet). He was a great-grandson of John Hay, 2nd Marquess of Tweeddale and the former Lady Mary Maitland (a daughter of John Maitland, 1st Duke of Lauderdale).

== Career ==
Hay served as an officer in the East India Company's Bombay Marine.

In 1787 he inherited the titles of his first cousin once-removed, the 6th Marquess. He then became a Burgess of Edinburgh a year later, Lord Lieutenant of Haddingtonshire in 1794, and a Scottish representative peer in 1796.

== Personal life ==
On 18 April 1785, he married Lady Hannah Maitland, a daughter of James Maitland, 7th Earl of Lauderdale and the former Mary Turner Lombe (daughter and co-heiress of Sir Thomas Lombe, Alderman and Sheriff of London). Together, George and Hannah were the parents of eleven children, including:

- George Hay, 8th Marquess of Tweeddale (1787–1876), the Governor of Madras who married Lady Susan Montagu, a daughter of William Montagu, 5th Duke of Manchester, in 1816.
- Lord James Hay (1788–1862), a General in the British Army who married Elizabeth Forbes, daughter and heiress of James Forbes of Seaton, in 1813.
- Lady Dorothea Frances Hay (c. 1789–1875), who married John Henry Ley, Clerk of the House of Commons, in 1809.
- Lady Hannah Charlotte Hay (c. 1792–1876), who married John Tharp, son of Joseph Tharp of Chippenham Park and Lady Susan Murray (daughter of John Murray, 4th Earl of Dunmore) in 1815.
- Lord John Hay (1793–1851), an MP and Rear-Admiral in the Royal Navy who married Mary Anne Cameron, eldest daughter of Donald Cameron of Lochiel, 22nd Chief of Clan Cameron, in 1846.
- Lady Elizabeth Hay (c. 1794–1868), who married James Joseph Hope-Vere of Craigiehall, son of William Hope-Vere (a grandson of Charles Hope, 1st Earl of Hopetoun), in 1813.
- Lady Julia Tomlinson Hay (1797–1835), who married John Hobhouse, 1st Baron Broughton, son of Sir Benjamin Hobhouse, 1st Baronet, in 1828.
- Lord Edward George Hay (1799–1862), a Colonel in the Army who died unmarried.
- Lord Thomas Hay (1800–1890), a Reverend who married Harriet Kinloch, daughter of Sir Alexander Kinloch, 8th Baronet of Gilmerton, in 1833.

As a result of the marquess's declining health, he and his wife went to travel on the Continent in 1802, starting in France. It was there that they were arrested by French police a year later with other British subjects when war was renewed between the two countries in May 1803. They were then imprisoned in the fortress at Verdun and the marchioness died there on 8 May 1804, as did the marquess during the following August on 9 August 1804.

Honorary titles
New office	Lord Lieutenant of East Lothian; 1794–1804	Succeeded by The Earl of Haddington
Peerage of Scotland
Preceded by George Hay	Marquess of Tweeddale; 1787–1804	Succeeded by George Hay
