= Arthur Hay, 9th Marquess of Tweeddale =

Scottish soldier and ornithologist

The Most Honourable The Marquess of Tweeddale FRS FRSE FZS
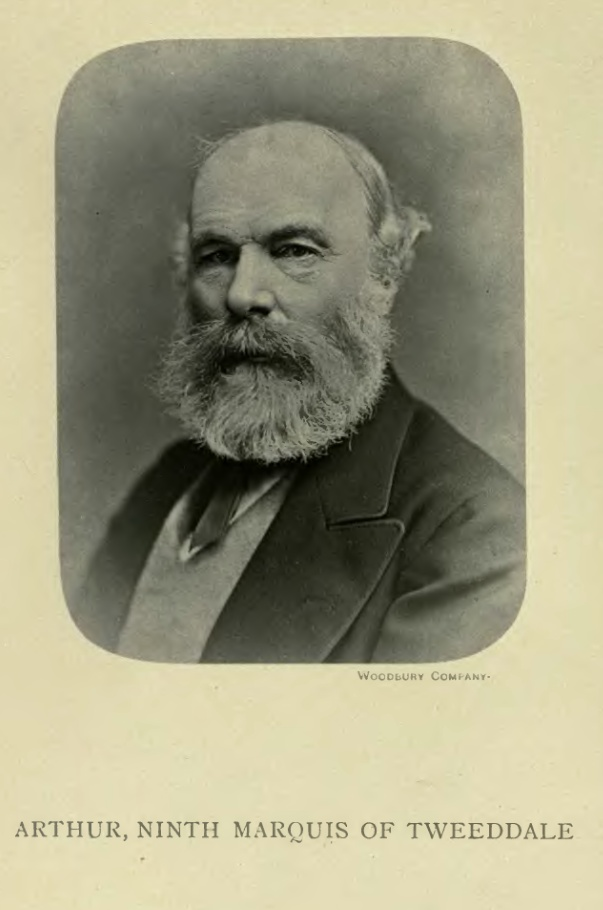
- Born: Arthur Hay; 9 November 1824; Yester House, Gifford, East Lothian, Scotland
- Died: 29 December 1878 (aged 54); Chislehurst, London, England
- Other names: Lord Arthur Hay, Viscount Walden
- Education: University of Leipzig, University of Geneva
- Spouses: Helene Kilmansegge (m. 1857; died 1871) Julia Stewart-Mackenzie (m. 1873)
- Parent(s): George Hay, 8th Marquess of Tweeddale; Lady Susan Montagu
- Scientific career
- Fields: Ornithologist, soldier
- Workplaces: Zoological Society of London (President 1868–1878)

Colonel Arthur Hay, 9th Marquess of Tweeddale, FRS FRSE FZS (9 November 1824 – 29 December 1878), known before 1862 as Lord Arthur Hay and between 1862 and 1876 as Viscount Walden, was a Scottish soldier and ornithologist.

== Life ==
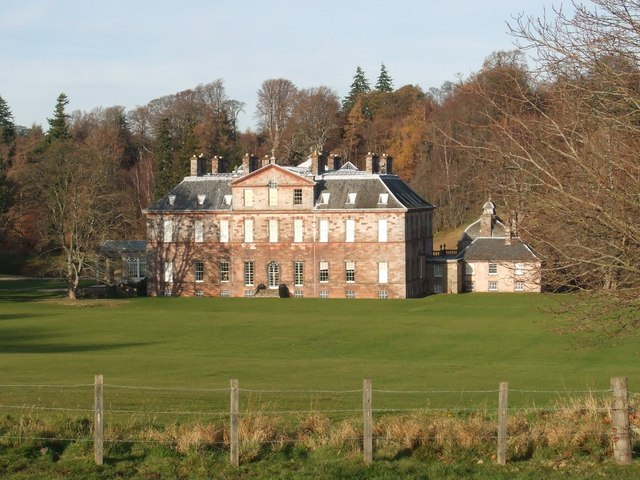
Yester House, birthplace of Lord Tweeddale

Lord Arthur Hay was born at Yester House near Gifford, East Lothian, the son of General Sir George Hay, 8th Marquess of Tweeddale and his wife, Lady Susan Montague. He was sent to university in both Leipzig and Geneva.

Training in the military he received a commission in the British Army in 1841. He rose to be a Colonel in the Grenadier Guards. He served as a soldier in India and the Crimea. He succeeded his father in the Marquessate in 1876.

Hay purchased a lieutenancy in the Grenadier Guards in 1841. He purchased a captaincy in 1846 and was promoted lieutenant-colonel without purchase in 1854 and colonel in 1860. In 1866 he transferred to the 17th Lancers.

He was president of the Zoological Society of London from 16 January 1868. He had a private collection of birds, insects, reptiles and mammals and employed Carl Bock to travel to Maritime Southeast Asia and collect specimens. Tweeddale described about 40 species collected by Bock for the first time and was elected a Fellow of the Royal Society in 1871. The holotype specimen of the Critically Endangered and enigmatic Malabar Civet was obtained by him and gave it to Asiatic Society of Bengal in 1845.

His ornithological works were published privately in 1881 by his nephew, Captain Robert George Wardlaw-Ramsay, with a memoir by Dr W. H. Russell, and the attribution Walden is used in taxonomic listings.

Lord Tweeddale died at Walden Cottage in Chislehurst, London on 28 December 1878. As he had no issue, he was succeeded as Marquess of Tweeddale by his brother, William.

== Family ==
He married twice: firstly in 1857 to Helene Kilmansegge (d.1871) and secondly in 1873 to Julia Mackenzie of Seaforth, daughter of Lt.-Colonel Keith William Stewart-Mackenzie (9 May 1818 – June 1881) (Note: Julia's father, Keith Mackenzie was a lieutenant in the 90th Regiment; subsequently major and CO, Ross-shire Highland Rifle Volunteers (1st Volunteer Bn. Seaforth Highlanders). Source: Grierson, James Moncrieff, Maj.-Gen. (1909). Records of the Scottish volunteer force, 1859-1908. Edinburgh, London: W. Blackwood and sons. p. 278. (with colour plates)) and of Hannah Charlotte Hope Vere. After Hay's death she married secondly Sir John Rose, 1st Baronet; and thirdly after his death William Evans-Gordon, MP. (All without issue).

Peerage of Scotland
Preceded by George Hay	Marquess of Tweeddale; 1876–1878	Succeeded by William Hay
