= Elizabeth Wellesley, Duchess of Wellington =

Mistress of the Robes to Queen Victoria

Her Grace The Duchess of Wellington VA
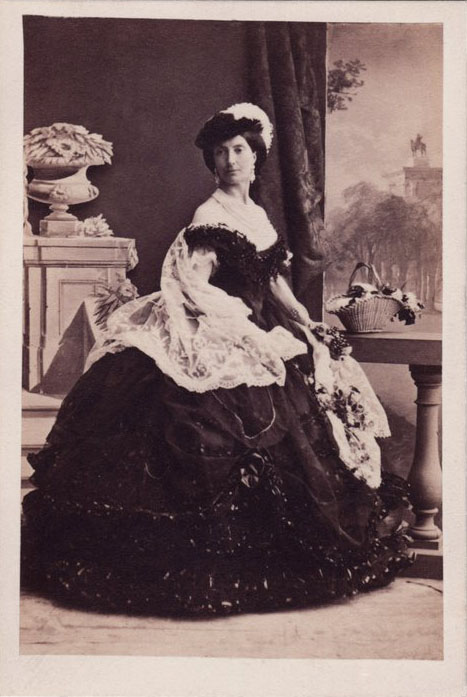

Personal details
- Born: Lady Elizabeth Hay; 27 September 1820
- Died: 13 August 1904 (aged 83) Burhill Park, Walton-on-Thames, Surrey, England
- Spouse: Arthur Wellesley, 2nd Duke of Wellington (m. 1839; died 1884)
- Parent(s): George Hay, 8th Marquess of Tweeddale; Lady Susan Montagu
- Occupation: Mistress of the Robes to Queen Victoria

Elizabeth Wellesley, Duchess of Wellington, VA (née Hay; 27 September 1820 – 13 August 1904), was a daughter of the 8th Marquess of Tweeddale. Her husband, Lord Douro, succeeded his father as duke of Wellington in 1852. She served as Mistress of the Robes to Queen Victoria from 1861 to 1868, and again from 1874 to 1880.

== Early life and family ==
Lady Elizabeth Hay was born a daughter of George Hay, 8th Marquess of Tweeddale. One of her brothers was the ornithologist Viscount Walden, and another the Admiral of the Fleet Lord John Hay.

== Marriage ==
On 18 April 1839, she was married to Lord Douro, eldest son of the famous general and former Tory Prime Minister the 1st Duke of Wellington. Lord Douro succeeded his father as second duke of Wellington in 1852. In 1863 she also became countess of Mornington when her husband inherited the earldom of Mornington on the death of his cousin William Pole-Tylney-Long-Wellesley, 5th Earl of Mornington.

The Duchess of Wellington was appointed Mistress of the Robes to Queen Victoria in 1861 by the Liberal Prime Minister Lord Palmerston, and continued in that role until 1868, serving through the governments of Lord Russell, Lord Derby and Benjamin Disraeli. She was again Mistress of the Robes in Disraeli's second government, 1874 to 1880.

Her husband died on 13 August 1884, and the Dowager Duchess survived him for exactly twenty years to the day, dying at Burhill Park, Walton-on-Thames on 13 August 1904. They had no children, and the marriage, which had been arranged by their respective families, was not a happy one; the historian Norman Gash writes, however, that her father-in-law "found much domestic pleasure" in Elizabeth's company.

The Duchess of Wellington was a Third Class recipient of the Royal Order of Victoria and Albert during Queen Victoria's reign.

Court offices
Preceded by The Duchess of Sutherland	Mistress of the Robes to Queen Victoria; 1861–1868	Succeeded by The Duchess of Argyll
Preceded by The Duchess of Sutherland	Mistress of the Robes to Queen Victoria; 1874–1880	Succeeded by The Duchess of Bedford
