= Inventory of Henry VIII =

16th-century list of possessions of the Crown

The Inventory of Henry VIII compiled in 1547 is a list of the possessions of the crown, now in the British Library as Harley MS 1419.

The inventory was made following a commission of 14 September 1547 during the first year of the reign of Edward VI. The surviving manuscripts list the possessions of Henry VIII item by item, by their location in houses. The armaments of ships and forts are also recorded. Altogether there are 17,810 items listed, and some of these entries contain multiple objects. Despite this abundance, only a very small number of objects survive and can be identified. The monetary values of the objects were not recorded, though the weights of many gold and silver items were given.

== Manuscripts ==
The three original manuscripts of the Inventory are; Society of Antiquaries MS 129A & B, and a duplicate copy at British Library Additional MS 46348; and British Library Harley MS 1419A & B. BL Add. MS 46348 was used in the Tower of London after the inventory was compiled to track changes in the royal collections and contains later annotations.

These manuscripts were edited and published in full for the first time in 1998. The published transcription allotted each item an index number to facilitate further study. The team of editors provided a thematic index of generic headings in alphabetical order. Within the index many heading provide short glossaries. This indexing solution to the large number of royal possessions has itself a helpful introduction running to three and half pages.

Another manuscript lists the ships of Henry VIII's navy; the three Anthony Rolls are kept by Magdalene College, Cambridge, and the British Library, and were published in 2000. Partial details of the royal library and other separate inventories of the King's books were also published in 2000.

Other lists of Henry's jewels survive, including an inventory made by William Compton in 1519. The inventories of James V of Scotland and Mary, Queen of Scots, including costume and jewellery were published in 1815, 1844, 1863 and 2004, from manuscripts in the National Archives of Scotland and British Library.

== The Whitehall Palace inventory of 1542 ==
Over 4000 objects at Whitehall Palace in the keeping of Sir Anthony Denny were recorded in 1542. This inventory survives in manuscript the National Archives at Kew, PRO E315/160 and PRO E101/472/2, and at the British Library, BL Lansdowne Rolls 14 & 15. The Whitehall inventory was published in 2004.

Another inventory of 1542 lists wardrobe stuff including tapestries and cushions at Windsor Castle in the keeping of William Tildesley, with later notes up to 1562.

== Portraits ==
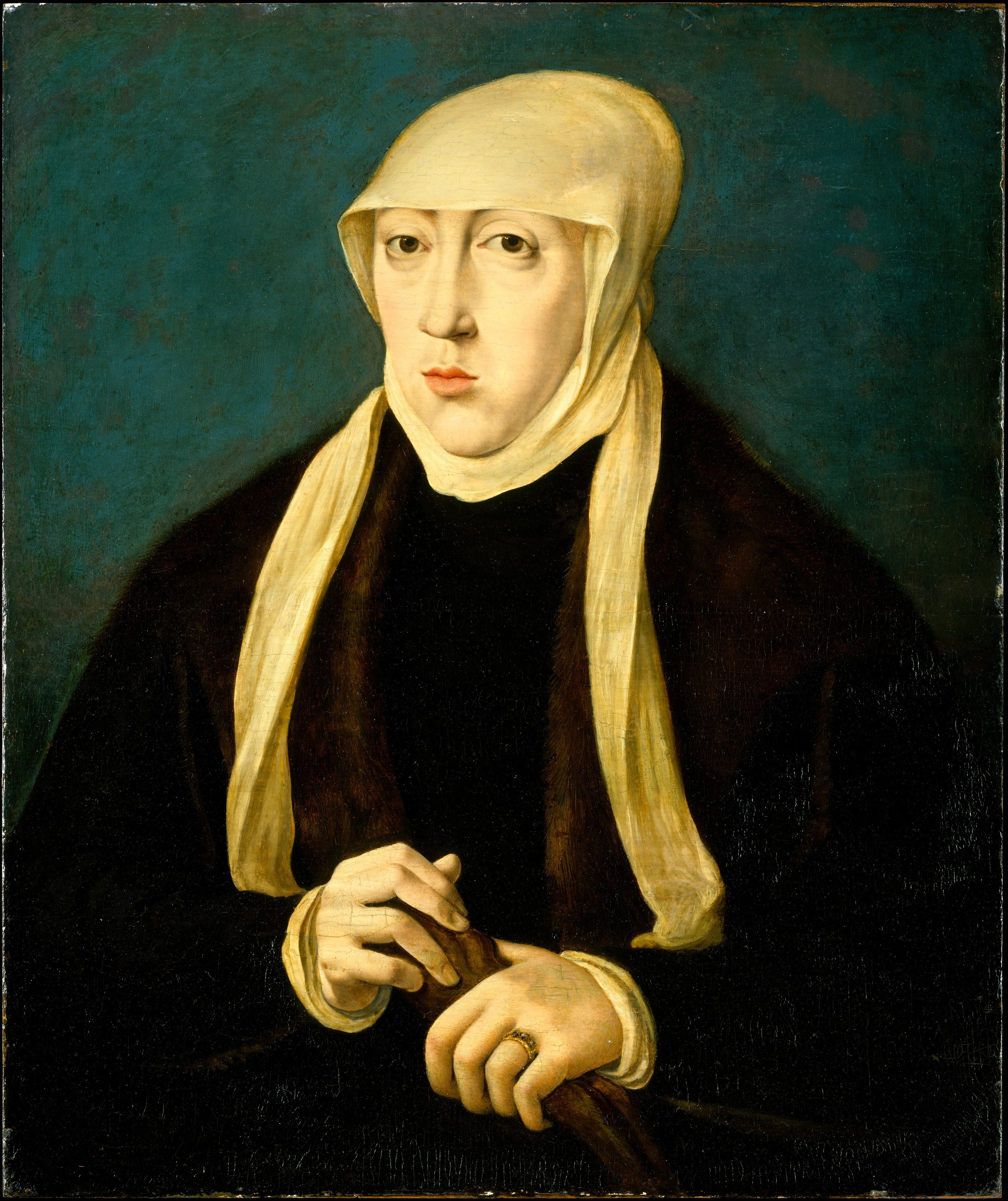
Mary of Hungary (governor of the Netherlands), Jan Cornelisz Vermeyen

Henry VIII had a collection of portraits including a portrait of King Arthur and one of Mary of Hungary, described as "a table of the Quene of Hungrie nowe Regent of Flaunders her hedde tiered in white".

Henry VIII owned a "picture of Jacobe kinge of Scottes with an hawke on his fist". Another listing has the legend "Jacobus quartus Rex scotorum". The picture may have been the model for the portrait of James IV of Scotland painted by Daniël Mijtens. A lost picture of a "woman having a monkey on her hand" framed with a yellow and white silk curtain may have been the inspiration for the portrait of Margaret Tudor with a common marmoset painted by Mijtens.

A portrait of Arthur, Prince of Wales showed him wearing a "red cap with a brooch upon it, and a collar of red and white roses". A portrait of Lady Margaret Beaufort, Countess of Richmond, had a curtain of yellow and white sarcenet paned together.

== Henry's collection ==
The inventory intended to list all of the late king's jewels, plate, stuff, ordinance, and munition. Commissioners were appointed to view the royal mansion houses, stables, and stores of munition. The sections below sketch aspects of this collection.

=== Gold, silver, and jewels ===
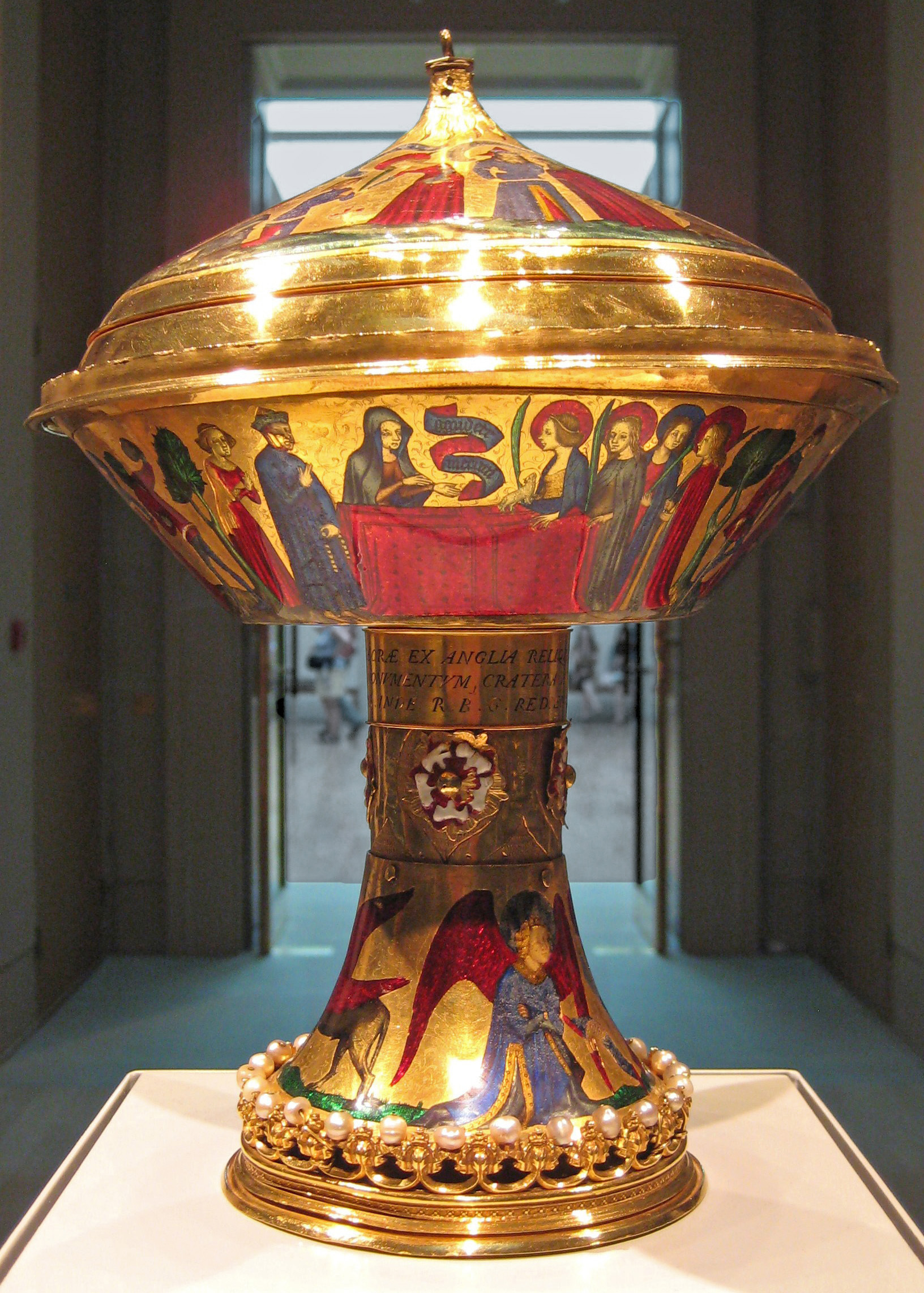
The Royal Gold Cup, 23.6 cm high, 17.8 cm across at its widest point; weight 1.935 kg of solid gold, enamels and jewels, showing Saint Agnes appearing to her friends in a vision.

The inventory has 3690 entries for precious metals and stones. These include a coffer of Catherine Parr's jewels which remained at the Tower of London, amongst its contents were gold headdresses set with pearls and diamonds (habillements); girdles with gold links set with diamonds, rubies and pearls; and two jewels fashioned with the initials "HK", for Henry and Katherine.

One recent acquisition was the Three Brothers, a pendant of balas rubies, diamonds and pearls bought from Anton Fugger:

"A jewell bought by the kinges Majestie of Anthony fulker and his company of Antewarpe in May 1551 and delivered to t'handes of the Earl of willteshere lorde treasurer of England by the kinges Majestie the VIIth day of June 1551.
A fayer flower of golde having sett in the same three table ballaces sett withowte foyle, and between everey ballace a perle, and in the myddes betwene the three ballaces a large pointed Diamounte and a perle pendaunt at one of the ballaces."

Edward VI was obliged to buy this jewel, which he described in his diary, for 100,000 crowns because the English crown owed £60,000 to the Fugger's bank.

The enamelled Royal Gold Cup which survives in the British Museum was listed as "a Cuppe of gold with Imagerie, the knopp a crowne Imperiall and aboute the bordre of the cover and the foote a Crowne garnished with lxii garnishing perles weying lxxix oz", and can be identified by its original number of pearls. The "knopp, a crowne Imperiall" and "the bordre of the cover" of the cup with its pearls were lost at some point between the 17th and 19th centuries. Notes in the inventory record diplomatic gifts given and some incidents; in the summer of 1552, Edward VI lost a large pearl pendant from a gold chain while riding between Titchfield and Southampton. The pearl was found and returned in May 1553. Some jewels were given to the goldsmith Everard Everdyes to be remodelled, and Everdyes made a crown for Edward VI for his coronation.

=== Palaces and houses ===
Apart from collections of jewels and the stores of the Royal Wardrobe, items were listed in the houses where they were kept. Henry had 55 different palaces. As well as Henry's major palaces, the contents of his children's homes and wardrobes were listed. These include;

- Manor of Beddington, Surrey, in the charge of Sir Michael Stanhope.
- Durham Place, London, former home of Prince Edward.
- The More, Hertfordshire, Wardrobe in the charge of Richard Hobbes.
- Manor of Nonsuche, Surrey, Wardrobe in the charge of Sir Thomas Cawarden.
- Nottingham Castle, Wardrobe in the charge of Thomas Clyeff.
- Manor of Otelands, in the charge of Sir Anthony Brown, Master of the King's Horses and Keeper of Oatlands.
- New Hall or the Manor of Beaulieu, Essex, in the charge of the Marquis of Northampton, usual home of Lady Mary.
- Manor of Richmond, Surrey, Wardrobe in the charge of William Griffithe.
- Sudeley Castle, Gloucestershire, effects of Catherine Parr.
- Woodstock Palace, Oxfordshire.
- Hampton Court, London.

The elaborate furnishing textiles and beds of these houses are listed in detail. Beyond this general magnificence, the inventory hints at Henry VIII's own interests and activities; at the Palace of Westminster there was a little study called the New Library, with equipment for writing, drawing, painting and surveying. Two shelves held patterns for castles and engines of war, and there was a portfolio for plans, noted as 'a case for a platte covered with leather.'

=== Tapestry and textiles ===
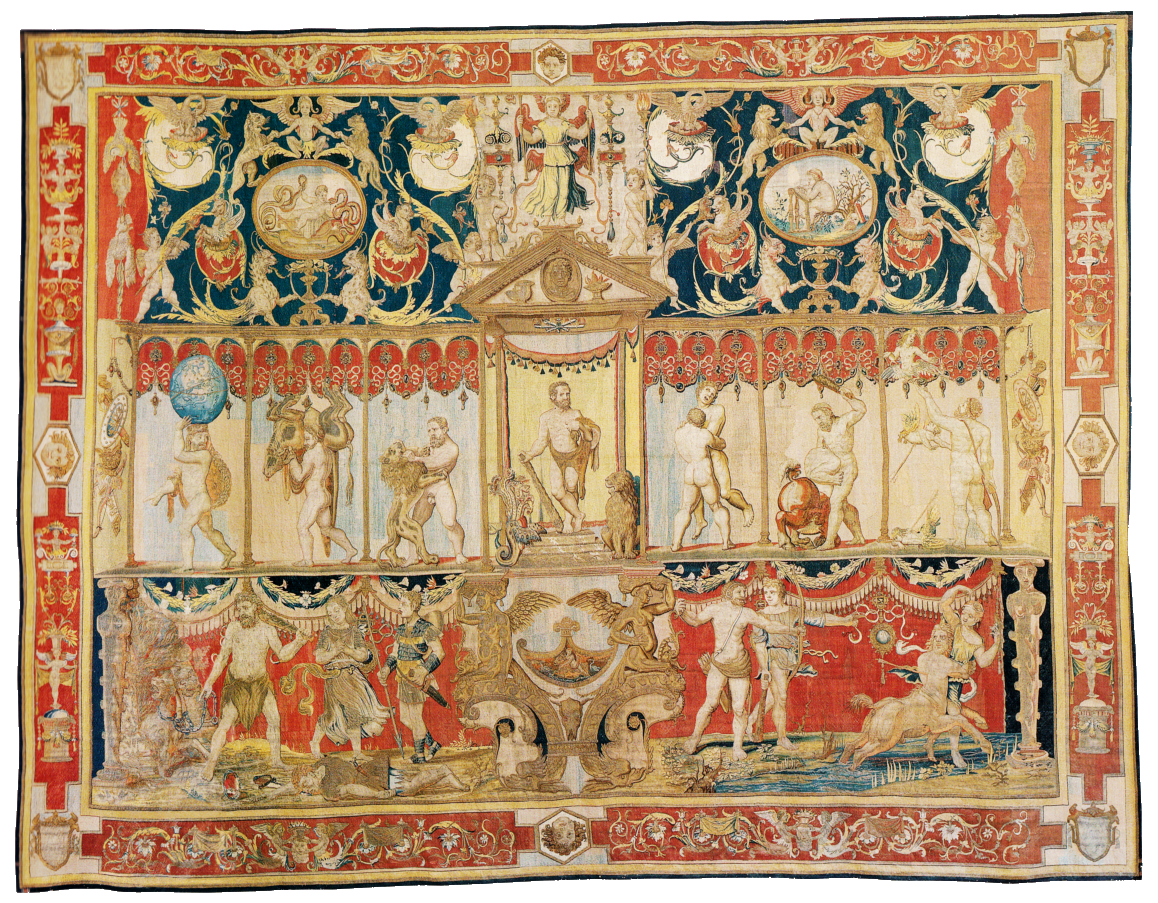
The Triumph of Hercules, part of a series of Antiques woven for Henry VIII

In 1906 the historian and tapestry-maker W. G. Thomson commented on the 1547 inventory that the king, "had a perfect mania for acquiring tapestries by any means that presented itself." Thomson was first to print the full list of tapestries but omitted the dimensions. These were given in English yards, or French and Flemish ells. In total, Thomas P. Campbell estimates the inventory list at approximately 2,450 tapestry wall hangings, and 300 other tapestry furnishings. An entry for one of the newer suites listed in the Wardrobe at Westminster reads;

"Item vii peces of fine newe Tapsterie of the Historye of Vulcanus Mars and venus lined withe Canvas whereof one pece conteyneth in Lengthe v yerdes iii quarters di The ii^{de} pece conteyneth in lengthe vii yerdes quarter di The iii^{de} pece conteyneth in lengthe vi yerdes di the iiii^{th} in lengthe v yerdes iii quarters The v^{th} in lengthe vii yerdes quarter The vi^{th} in length vi yerdes di and the vii^{th} in length vii yerdes quarter everye of the saide peces conteyning in depthe iiii yerdes quarter di."

Amongst the many other furnishing textiles of embroidered silk and brocade in the Wardrobe at Hampton Court there was a crimson bed and a pair of crimson satin cushions embroidered with the arms of James V of Scotland. These items may have been seized at Edinburgh in 1544.

Amongst verdure tapestry with "broad blooms" there was a set with birds and apples and another group featuring roses, pomegranates, or pots at the corners. The pomegranate an emblem of Catherine of Aragon. Mary I gave some of these tapestries to George Brediman, a groom of the chamber.

A zibellino, a sable fur accessorized with a gold head and muzzle set with emeralds, turquoises and rubies, with a ruby tongue and four gold feet set with turquoises, had belonged to one of his queens, and was given to Lady Jane Grey. Some of the sable fur bought from Christopher Haller for Henry's wardrobe was sold to Katheryne Adlington. The inventory includes notes of bills and invoices paid by Anthony Cope, the chamberlain of Catherine Parr, to her goldsmiths, embroiderers, mercers, saddler, and her silkwoman Mistress Shakerley.

=== Furniture and furnishings ===
Henry VIII became infirm in old age and was carried between the rooms of his palaces in chairs called "trauewes" or "trammes". The chairs had a step or "half pace" at the front for two stools. Two were upholstered with tanny velvet. Another "trauewe" was finished in russet velvet, and the fourth in purple velvet. The backs of the chairs were embroidered with a rose with Venice gold thread. The use of the chairs was described in 1546, "two chairs called trammes for the king's majesty to sit in, to be carried to and fro in his galleries & chambers".

=== Revels ===
The properties of the Master of Revels, Thomas Cawarden run to 237 items. As well as costumes for court Masques for men and women, and bards (decorative trappings for horses), Cawarden was also keeper of the royal tents. The theatrical props included;

- Two coverings of cloth-of-gold tissue and purple velvet embroidered with a man-at-arms of silver riding upon a Mount and a lady standing in clouds casting darts at him with harts and 'sisars' of gold. (no. 8607)
- 12 long narrow masquing garments for men of cloth-of-gold and tissued gold and silver guarded about the skirts with green tinsel (silk woven with metal ribbon) and guarded all over with green satin bend-wise (diagonally) under four bodies colours and undersleeves of cloth-of-silver, the long sleeves hanging by of cloth-of-silver and cloth of tissue paned bar-wise (horizontal stripes) having great leaves of green satin about, the 'Scise' of the sleeves 12 'scaplers' of crimson satin cut and edged with yellow sarsenet with leaves about the colour of green satin. 12 hats to the same of the said cloth-of-gold tissued fringed with Cologne silver and garnished with leaves of green satin. (no. 8619)
- 8 Italian gowns for women with ruff sleeves, 4 of flat cloth-of-gold striped with silver, 'cheverned' with crimson satin, upon the labels or pendants of yellow sarsenet hanging of great tassels at the skirts, the nether bases or skirts of purple velvet upon silver th'under sleeves of crimson tinsel (silk woven with metal ribbon) cut upon white sarsenet, th'other 4 of flat cloth-of-silver striped with gold with ruff sleeves, nether sleeves, labels and 'chevernes' as the other first 4, the nether skirts of cloth-of-gold tissue blue, 8 coiffs of Venice gold with their perukes of hair hanging to them and long labels of coloured lawn. (no. 8659)
- 8 costumes for female dancers portraying imagined African people called "Mores". made of silver, cloth of gold, and "tilsent" with "head pieces or coiffes to the same of like stuff having perukes of here (hair) everie of them". The wigs were made by an Italian artist Niccolo da Modena.

Cawarden's store of tents included lodgings and dining-houses for the King, with furnishings of rich painted and embroidered hangings. Tents from the royal store were issued to the Earl of Warwick for his military campaign to Scotland in the Summer of 1547, including a pavilion and hale (hall tent) of the "King's highness' lesser Lodging," to be used for the commander's field headquarters. (nos.8765-8839) Cawarden had extra expense drying these tents, which came back "from Skotland wetted in the shippe."

=== Musical instruments ===
Most of the listed musical instruments were kept at Westminster Palace by Philip van Wilder. The decoration distinguished some of the larger pieces. Some were painted in the 'antique manner', decoration in renaissance character incorporating Italianate grotesques. Henry played several instruments, while at Lille in September 1513 with Margaret of Austria before the siege of Tournai, he performed on the lute, harp, lyre, flute, and horn. The inventory included;

- Bagpipes; one of purple velvet with ivory pipes; 4 bagpipes with ivory pipes, all at Westminster.
- Clavichords, 2; one covered in gilt leather, another silvered, Westminster.
- Crumhorns; a case of 7; another case of 4; at Westminster; 7 ivory 'crok horns' in a case in the Long Gallery at Hampton Court.
- Cornetts; one from the effects of James Rufford.
- Dulcenses, unidentified woodwind, 5 short instruments called 'dulcenses' covered with black leather; 8 covered with black leather some with silver tips.
- 5 Flutes of ivory tipped with gold enamelled black; 5 cases of four flutes, one missing; a case of 15 flutes; a case of 7 flutes; a flute and 2 fifes of black ebony tipped with silver in a red leather bag; 3 glass flutes and one of wood painted like glass; 3 wood flutes; 3 more flutes in a red leather bag; all at Westminster.
- Gitteron pipes, 14 wood gitteron pipes called cornets; 2 ivory gitteron pipes, silver tipped and gilt, called cornets.
- A Harpsichord
- An Instrument that goes with a wheel without playing upon, wood varnished yellow and decorated with 6 silver plates pounced with 'antique work' with gilt copper edges.
- One Regal and virginals; a double virginal and double Regal; a single Regal and single virginal.
- Lutes; 23 with cases; a gitteron (gittern) and a lute in a leather covered case, at Westminster; 1 Venice lute.
- Organs, 3 inventory entries, one the Chapel of St James's Palace.
- Pilgrim staves, called Flutes, a case of 10, only six complete, a case for 7 shawms with 5 pilgrim staves in it, all at Westminster.
- Pipes, 4 inventory entries, a case of pipes at Westminster.
- Portative organs; a pair of portatives covered with crimson satin and embroidered with gold and silver passement on an oak table in a chamber in the Long Gallery at Hampton Court at the garden end, another 'instrument' with similar decoration in the chamber between the Bed Chamber and Privy Chamber, (these two rooms were small oratories).
- Recorders; 9 wood recorders; a velvet-covered case of 4 walnut recorders; a case of 6 ivory recorders; a great bass recorder; two red-wood (in imitation of walnut) bass recorders one tipped with silver; a velvet case with 8 ivory recorders; 8 box-wood recorders; 7 wood recorders; 4 ivory recorders; all at Westminster.
- Regals;
  - double regals, 6; two covered in purple velvet embroidered with the king's arms; another with the King and Jane Seymour's arms; one with the arms & garter; one painted with 'antique work' and the King and Jane Seymour's arms, all at Westminster; another at Windsor Castle, painted 'antique' with a rose painted and gilt.
  - pairs of Regals, 4 entries; a pair of Regals in crimson velvet case in the Long Gallery at Hampton Court, a pair in the Queen's Gallery at Hampton Court.
  - 9 Pairs of Single Regals, at Westminster; two pairs with the royal arms and garter painted on the bellows; one pair painted with black 'antique work'; another painted with black arabesque.
  - a fair instrument being Regals and virginals in the King's withdrawing chamber at Greenwich Palace..
- Shawms; 1 wood; one box-wood; 8 other shawms in 3 leather cases, at Westminster.
- Taberde, its case and a pipe at Westminster.
- Viols; 19 great and small; 4 gitterons with their cases called Spanish viols; a red chest with 6 viols with the King's arms, all at Westminster,
- Virginals; a new pair of double virginals covered with black leather with small printed and gilt roses, the lid lined in green and garnished with red silk ribbon lozenge-wise; another new pair yellow varnished with red arabesque work, lid with purple lining and painted and gilt with the King's arms; a little pair covered with red leather; 2 fair pairs of new long virginals made harp fashion of cypress wood with ivory keys with the King's arms crowned with his grace's beasts and the garter gilt, with a case in walnut with white wood inlay of 'antique' pattern; a [blank in MS] virginal on a timber foot in a cabinet covered with crimson satin in the Privy Gallery at Westminster; a pair in the King's gallery at Greenwich Palace; two old pairs at the More; an old and very broken pair at Beaulieu alias New Hall.
  - At Hampton Court; a pair fashioned like harp, and 7 pairs in cases of printers (i.e. printed) leather in the Long Gallery; a pair in the 'next' or second bedchamber.

=== Ships ===
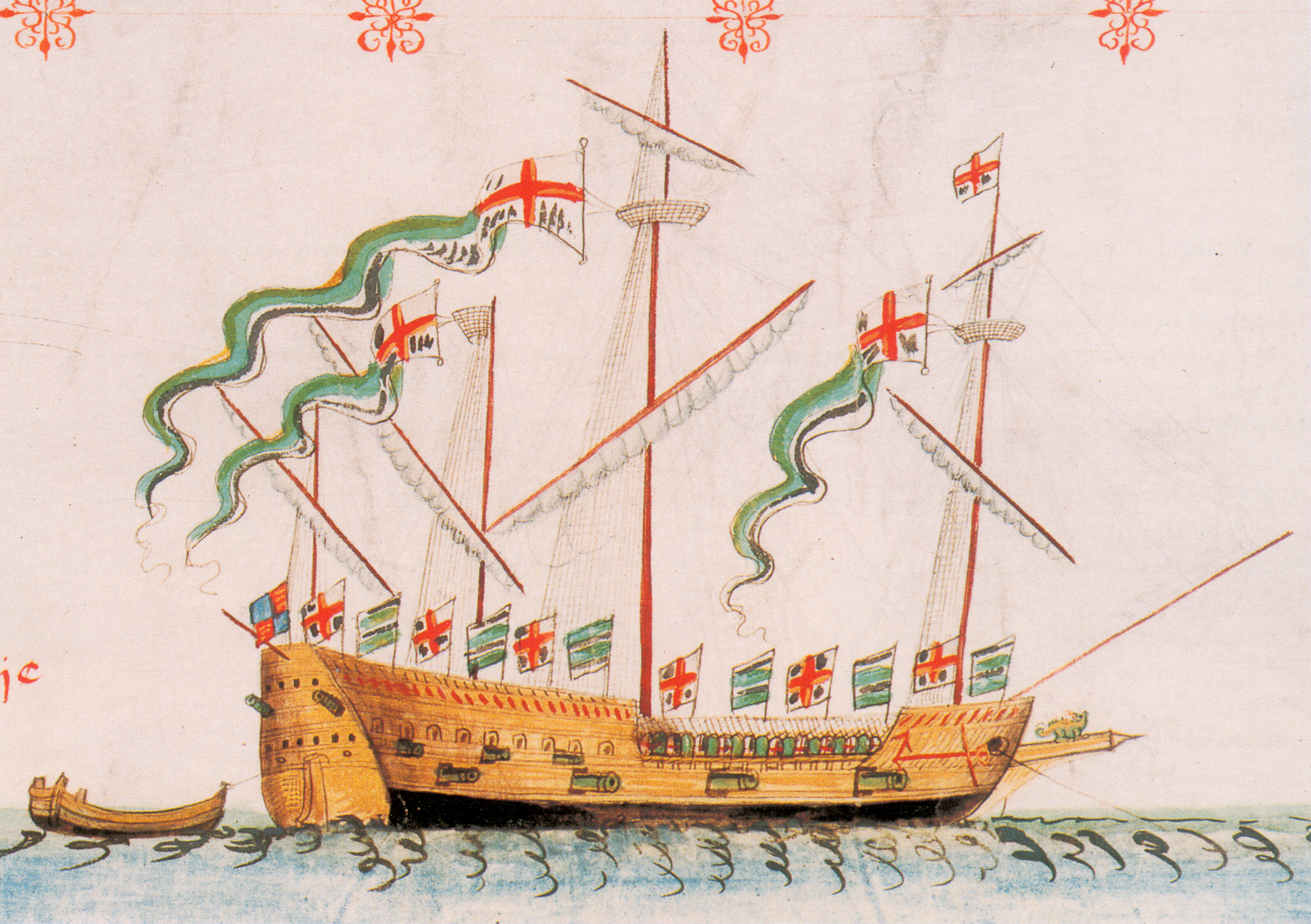
The galley Salamander, in the Anthony Roll

The ship lists includes those at sea and those docked. There are separate entries for munitions and crew. The munitions list records cannon, hand-arms, powder and shot. Crews are numbered as mariners and gunners. Two ships had been captured at Leith in 1544 from the Royal Scots Navy. The listed ships include:

- The Antlopp, item reference numbers for 1547 inventory; crew, 7180; arms, 7555–7577.
- The Henry Grace a dewe, nos. 7164, 7127–7251.
- The marie willowby, nos. 7176, 8140–8151.
- The Petir, nos. 7165, 7252–7273.
- The Sallomander, nos. 7178, 7625–7644.

=== Forts and armouries ===
The guns of English coastal fortifications and forts in France are noted. At major establishments the armaments are noted by bulwark and blockhouse. The list was compiled from December 1547 to March 1548 during the war of the Rough Wooing so a number of outposts in the Scottish Borders are recorded; as were some of the Scottish guns captured at the battle of Pinkie. The inventory details body armour supplied from the Hampton Court armoury for the Scottish expedition. There was also iron shot for captured Scottish guns stored at Calais.

Shot, powder, gunnery tools, and other equipment was recorded. Some cannon were old, dangerous, broken, or un-mounted, and the lists noted broken firing chambers for breech-loaders. Some of these broken cannon had burst when firing salutes. The Ordnance house at Calais had accumulated quantities of iron shot of redundant calibre. Equipment at the Tower of London included some exotic pieces and large numbers of decorated ceremonial hand-arms. Most garrisons held Moorish pikes, bills and bows. Armouries and fortified places with royal cannon listed included;

==== London armouries ====
- Bridewell Palace; quantity of horsemen's and foot armour in the charge of Thomas Wolner, the King's armourer.
- Deptford Dockyard; quantity of Almain rivets (light German) armour in disrepair in the charge of Thomas Wolner.

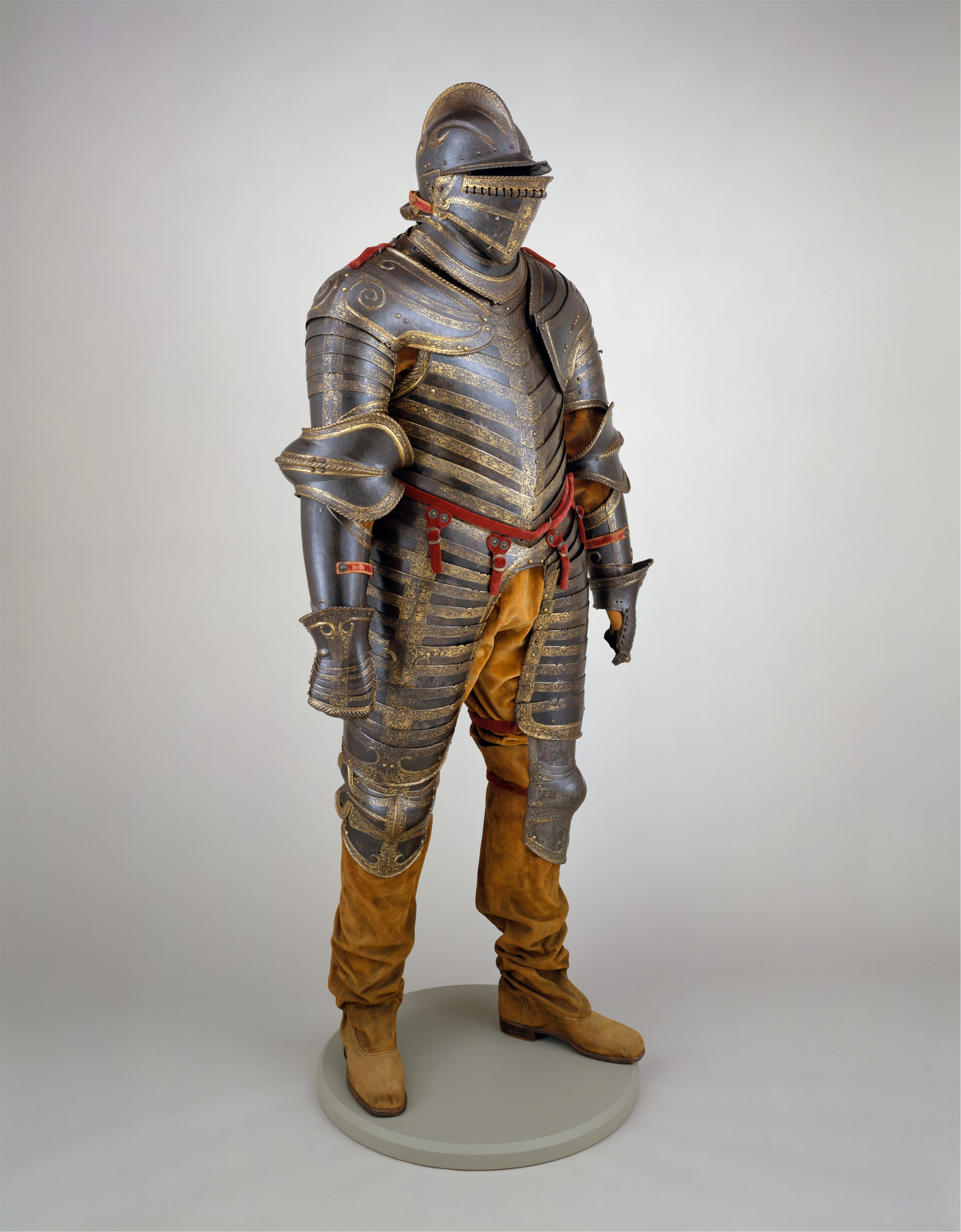
An Italian armour of Henry VIII, now in the Metropolitan Museum of Art

- Greenwich Armoury, in the charge of Erasmus Kyrkenar, armourer; 115 items; includes; 100 Italian pieces (handguns) furnished and delivered to my Lord Protectors grace at his going to Scotland.
- Greenwich Tiltyard, in the charge of Sir Thomas Paston;
  - The Long House; an armour for the King (Henry VIII), all graven and parcel gilt which was to be taken on the King's voyage to Boulogne; etc.
  - First House; on the second (wooden) horse an armour given to Sir Harry Knyvet over the sea, and a steel saddle with blue velvet that served Captain Julian at the battle of Campe in France; on the third (wooden) horse an armour given to the King by the Emperor Maximilian; etc.
  - Second House; 3 elaborate horse armours.
  - Third House, equipment for Edward VI's practice; a horse of wood with a bridle of cloth-of-tissue and russet velvet with two collars with 16 bells silver and gilt; 2 saddles of crimson velvet embroidered with goldsmith's spangles silver and gilt; a saddle of blue velvet embroidered with spangles of goldsmith's work, all white; a saddle of purple velvet embroidered with goldsmith's work silver and gilt; a saddle of black velvet fringed with Venice gold; one heavy 'Arymygne' sword for the King.
  - Little Houses, tilting armour; smaller house; 2 tonlets (armour skirts) and a basinet; 2 cuirasses and basinets; a cuirass and no basinet; 3 manifers (bridle-hand tilting glove); 3 pairs of vambraces with 2 polder muttons (right elbow tilting armour); 2 pass guards (left elbow armour) and a collar; etc. Larger house; a parcel gilt tonlet with a basinet complete except a gauntlet; 1 hosting (field) armour lacking a gauntlet; 2 cuirasses for fighting on foot with basinets and breeches; etc.
- Hampton Court; delivered out of the store by John Lyndsay; 200 pairs of Almain rivets (front and back plates); 200 pairs of Almain rivets to the Earl of Warwick by the Lord's warrant at Sheen 20 July 1547, (for use in Scotland); 550 pairs of Almain rivets delivered for use in the 3 shires of Wales, 9 July 1547; 300 more pairs for use in Wales delivered to George Penriddock servant to Sir George Herbert for use in Wales, 9 July 1547; remaining at Hampton Court in John Lyndsey's hands, 27 pairs, breast and back. 20 pairs of vambraces; 24 pairs of gauntlets; 58 maces; 328 old steel saddles; 494 new steel saddles received since Henry's death from William Damsell, King's Agent in Flanders; other armour and old horse and rider's armour. Delivered by John Lyndsey out of the store since the death of Henry VIII; 50 complete armour for demi-lances, "to my Lord Protectors grace against his voiage into Scotlande," with 100 maces and 40 steel saddles; 231 lances to be sold for the King by Sir Richard Gresham.
- Westminster Palace, in the charge of Sir Thomas Darcy and Hans Hunter, armourer; includes 8 wooden target shields painted with diverse histories, trimmed with velvet with five crimson satin girdles.
  - Westminster, in the charge of Alan Bawdesonne; fine handguns including; 380 Italian pieces gilt without chambers with flasks and touch boxes, 16 flasks missing; 2 Italian pieces parcel gilt and varnished covered with velvet; a chamber piece in a stock of wood lined in the cheek with velvet; one long chamber piece with a fire-lock set in walnut; etc.
  - Westminster, in the charge of Hans Hunter, armourer; a complete harness (armour) with a long 'bast' engraved all-over and parcel gilt with roses and pomegranates which belonged to Henry VII of England; etc.
  - Westminster, in the charge of John Lyndsay, armourer; 564 Almain rivets with 560 back plates and 526 pairs of splints (greaves) with 454 matching sallets; 524 collars and gorgets.
- Windsor Castle, John Lyndsay; 384 Almain rivets with 382 back plates and 380 pairs of splints; 357 sallets and sculls; 377 gorgets; 369 steel codpieces.

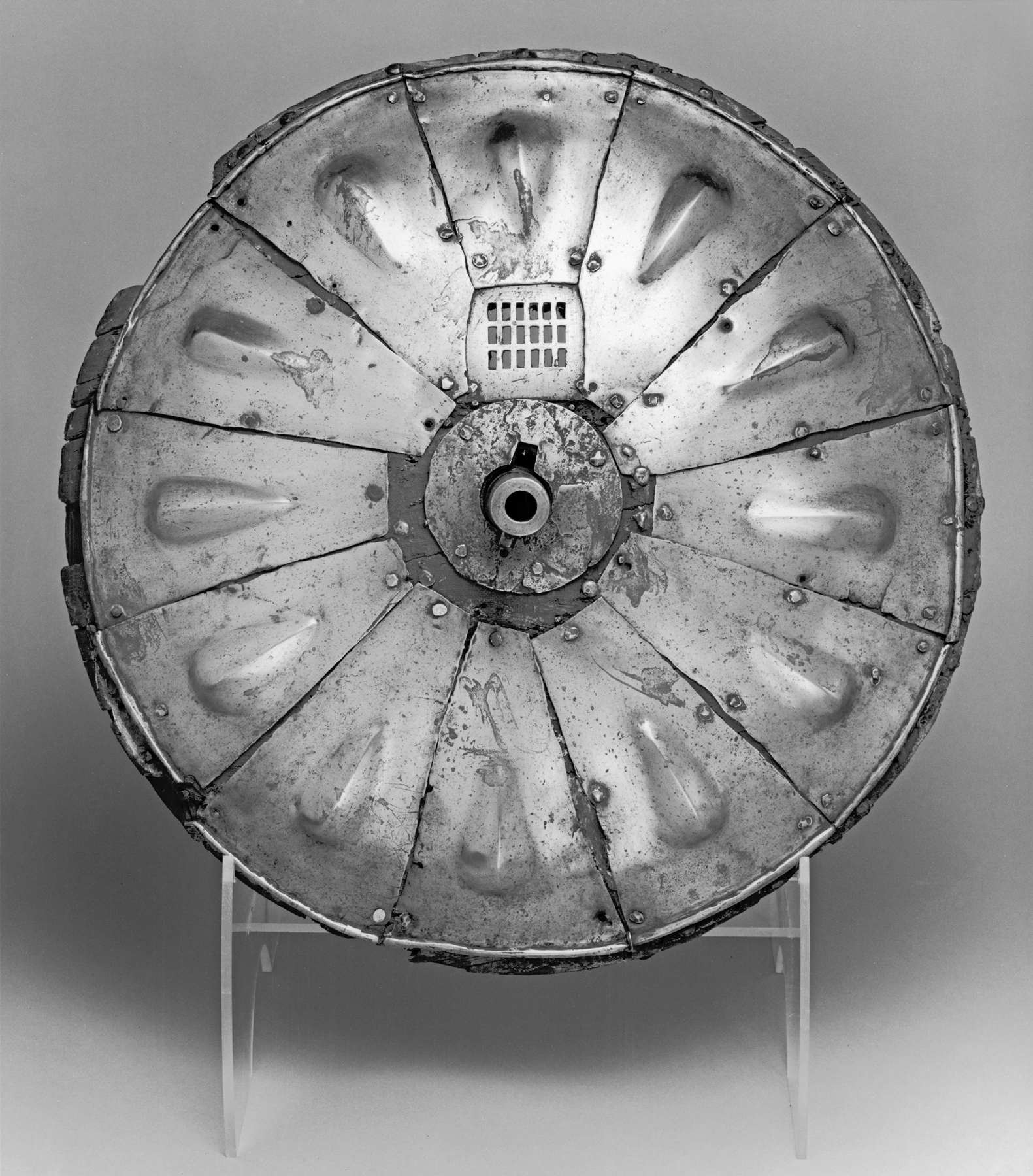
One of Henry's shield and gun combinations, now in the Walters Art Museum

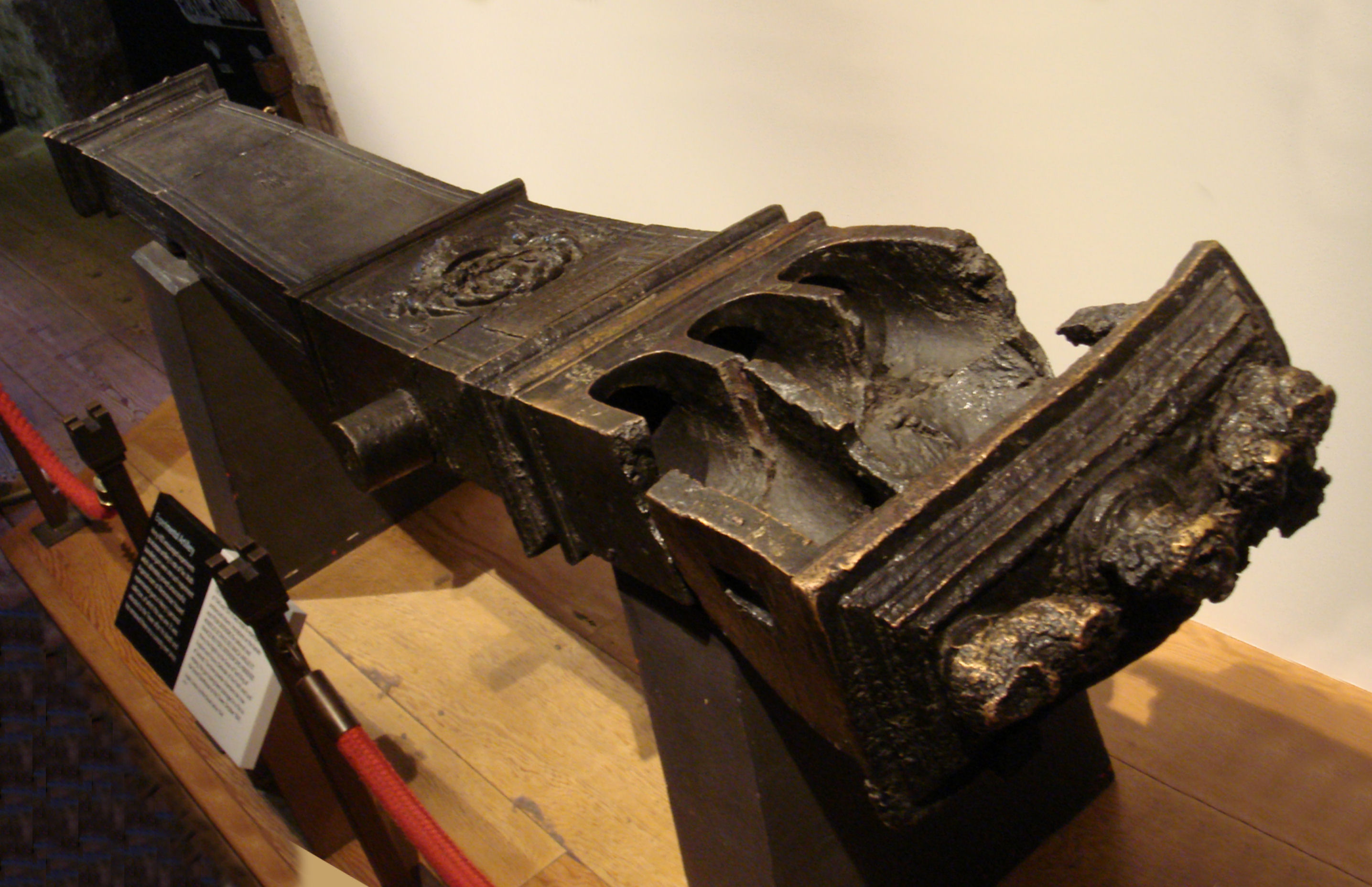
Henry VIII's three shot breech-loader, Royal Armouries

- Tower of London, in the charge of Sir Philip Hoby, Master of the Ordnance, 20 February 1548.
  - Guns
    - Brass guns; 4 cannons; 2 Venetian cannons; 2 cannons-perrier; 4 demi-cannons; 6 culverins; 6 sakers; 10 minions; 1 falcon; 1 broad falcon firing three shot; 5 culverins.
    - French brass guns; 2 demi-cannon; 1 culverin; 1 saker; 2 falcons.
    - Scottish brass guns; 1 demi-culverin; 2 culverins; 3 sakers; 1 falcon; 9 falconets; 1 robinet.
    - Iron guns; 3 bombards; 30 port pieces; 5 slings; 10 demi-slings; 15 quarter slings; 2 fowlers; 8 double bases; 20 demi-bases; 13 top pieces great and small; 204 wagon bases; 41 hail shot pieces, 6500 complete handguns.
    - Bows and arrows; 360 bows; 80 gross of bowstrings; 13050 livery arrows.
  - Munitions; 6700 black bills; 306 halberds; 480 javelins; 100 holy water sprinklers; 20100 moorish pikes; 120 demi-lanes; 600 Northern staves; 60 top darts; 1500 shovels; 1000 pickaxes; 180 felling axes; 90 hedging bills; 120 scythes; 24 hooks.
  - Munitions conveyed to the Tower from Westminster Palace, 7 July 1547.
    - First house; 129 demi-hacks or handguns, 214 flasks and touch boxes; 3 brass hagbuts a croke; 1 iron hagbut a croke; 2 hacks; 118 great holy water sprinklers; 7 holy water sprinklers with guns in them; 1 holy water sprinkler with 3 guns; 392 little holy water sprinklers; 27 poleaxes with guns in the ends; 2 poleaxes without guns; 292 boar spears with ash staves trimmed with crimson velvet, fringed with red silk; 162 boar spears knotted and leathered; 97 boar spears with ash staves trimmed with leather; 2 boar spears graven and gilt; 126 white halberds with plain staves; 95 white halberds garnished with crimson velvet; 14 Almain bills; 209 javelins trimmed with white, green, black silk and fustian of apes; 35 target shields with guns; 7 plain target shields; 1 target with 20 little guns; 1 target with 4 guns; a long target 1 gun; 59 moorish pikes garnished with velvet and parcel gilt heads; 12 old targets; 117 poleaxes parted with crimson velvet; 7 broken iron demi-hacks; 3 broken little brass guns; 213 javelins with staves partly trimmed with crimson velvet.
    - Second house; 192 partisan heads without staves party gilt; 87 Moorish pike heads party gilt without staves; 16 dart heads party gilt; 66 grain stave heads party gilt; 52 halberd heads party gilt without staves; 110 javelin heads party gilt without staves; 23 rawcon heads (Italian bill heads) party gilt without staves; 8 Moorish pike heads without staves with damask work gilt; 3 short javelin heads without staves with damask work gilt; 2 hand axe heads without staves; 422 javelins with staves party gilt garnished with velvet; 293 javelins with staves ungilt garnished with crimson velvet; 272 javelins staved with short heads party gilt; 91 partisans party gilt garnished with velvet; 45 plain targets (targes) painted and gilt; 2 targets painted, gilt, and lined with black velvet; 2 targets, one black, one white; 24 Moorish pikes garnished with velvet and parcel gilt; 661 partisans staved and garnished with velvet pacel gilt; 60 targets painted and gilt fringed with silk; 24 short javelin heads party gilt without staves.
    - Third house; 71 demi-hacks and handguns; 275 short guns for horsemen with leather cases furnished with horns and purses; 5 guns with three hales each (triple barreled breech-loaders); an iron gun with 4 halles (quadruple barreled breech-loader); a gun with 2 halles (double barreled breech-loader); 188 three-grained staves trimmed with crimson velvet; 47 raucons (Italian bills); 2 little brass guns on carriages with shod wheels, being patterns for cannon; a little brass gun on a carriage, being a pattern for demi-cannon; 2 little brass guns on carriages, pattern for culverins; a little brass mortar stocked and garnished with iron; a little brass mortar gun mounted on a red stock.
    - Gallery; 104 moorish pikes garnished with velvet and parcel gilt heads.
    - Fifth house; 60 targets painted and gilt of sundry sorts; 100 short plain pollaxes; 3 two-hand pollaxes; 1 hand pollaxe with a gun and its case; 4 gilt pollaxes with crimson velvet covered staves fringed with gold silk; 2 gilt halberds with purple velvet covered staves fringed with gold and silk; 27 gilt halberds garnished with crimson velvet; 25 three-grained staves partly gilt garnished with crimson velvet; 66 'raucons' with staves garnished with velvet and fringed.
    - Sixth house; 133 plain targets without guns fringed with silk; 13 plain targets without silk; a steel target with a great boss fringed with silk & gold; 2 steel bucklers; 2 steel targets lined with velvet; 2 steel targets with guns; a buff leather target; a buff gilt leather target; 652 Moorish pikes garnished with leather and parcel gilt heads.
  - Received from the charge of Sir Anthony Denny; 6 forest bills, 2 with black staves, 4 white; 2 partisans. (staff-weapon for ceremonial use), party gilt with the King's arms graven on them, garnished with green passementerie, fringed with green and white silk; 3 partisans party gilt garnished with blue velvet and fringed with blue silk; 37 partisans party gilt garnished with green velvet and fringed with green and white silk; more partisans, pikes and targets; 7 crossbows of sundry making with 4 pairs of windlasses being broken; a rack to bend a crossbow; a crossbow for stone shot; a quiver for prick arrows for crossbows.

==== England ====
- Cornwall;
  - Pendennis Castle, under John Killegrewe; 1 brass demi-culverin on old wheels; 1 brass culverin on wheels; 4 port-pieces on truckles; 1 iron sling well stocked & mounted on wheels; 4 iron slings (dangerous); 2 iron demi-slings (dangerous); 10 iron double bases well mounted, 12 hagbuts a croke, 40 old yew bows; 30 bills; 26 Moorish pikes.
  - St Mawes Castle; 1 demi-cannon; 1 demi-culverin; 4 mounted port-pieces; 5 slings; 1 demi-sling; 7 mounted bases; 12 hagbuts; 30 bows; 15 Moorish pikes; 18 bills; 2 crowbars; 4 pick and sledgehammers.
- Dorset;
  - Brounkesey Fortresse; 1 brass culverin on shod wheels, 9 ft length, 5.25 inch shot; 1 iron saker on shod wheels, 9 ft length, 4.25 inch shot, another broken; 1 demi-culverin on carriage shod, 8 ft length, 4 inch shot; 1 iron saker unshod, 7 ft length, 3.25 inch shot.
  - Portland Castle and Island; 1 brass demi-cannon; 1 brass culverin newly mounted on unshod wheels; 2 brass demi-culverins newly mounted on unshod wheels; 4 iron port pieces 2 newly mounted with axles and truckles; 1 iron portruguese sling newly stocked on unshod wheels; 2 iron slings on unshod wheels; 1 sling lacking chamber on wheels; 3 chambered slings newly mounted on axles and truckles; 23 bows; 24 fighting bills; 14 Moorish pikes; an engine for mounting ordinance.
  - Sandsfoot Fortress, under Captain Robert Coines; 4 culverins; 4 iron slings; 5 bases; 12 iron hagbuts; 50 yew bows; 300 bills; 30 Moorish pikes.
- Essex;
  - East Tilbury, under John Lawrence; 1 iron demi-culverin on unshod wheels; 1 'curtall' saker on shod wheels; 1 iron saker on unshod wheels; 1 iron bombard; 1 brass falcon with shod wheels; 1 falconet on unshod wheels; 3 iron double bases; 7 iron single bases; 1 sling on unshod wheels; 1 demi-sling unmounted; 4 iron slings on carriages; 4 iron fowlers on carriages; 3 iron fowlers on high wheels; 2 serpentines; 4 hagbuts; 30 handguns, 1 broken; 49 bows; 32 moorish pikes; 40 black bills.
  - West Tilbury Bulwark; 1 brass demi-cannon; 1 brass falconet; 1 iron bombard; 3 iron sakers; 1 iron double sling with 2 broken chambers; 2 iron fowlers; 6 iron bases, 1 broken; 8 single bases; 6 hagbuts; 30 demi-hacks; a chest of bows, 16 more bows; 40 bills; 30 moorish pikes.
- Hampshire;
  - Calshot Castle, under Walter Russell, gent; 24 cannon; 6 iron hagbuts; 60 bows, 170 bills, 100 pikes, these decayed.
  - Hurst Castle, under Captain Thomas Barton, 24 cannon; 12 hagbuts of crock; 24 bows; 14 Moorish pikes; 27 bills.
  - Portsmouth, under Captain Edward Vaughan. Vaughan made a list of cannon at Portsmouth on 16 February 1547.
    - Between the baskets at the Tower; 1 brass culverin, a 'furlocke' piece; 1 brass bastard culverin made by Parson Levettes (William Levett gunfounder in the Weald).
    - The Platform.
    - Green bulwark.
    - Baskets along the wall behind the brewhouse; 3 iron port pieces.
    - East bulwark.
      - The baskets at the gate; 1 iron port piece; 1 iron falcon.
      - Mount at the gate within the door.
      - Brays beneath the mount; 2 port pieces with 3 chambers each; 2 port pieces with 4 chambers.
      - At the gate; an iron flanker with one chamber; a broken brass saker called a 'minion.'
    - Guy's bulwark; 3 iron flankers; 1 iron half-sling; 1 brass falcon; 1 brass saker; iron lead and stone shot.
      - Baskets at Guy's bulwark; 3 iron port pieces with five chambers.
    - Upon the walls to the Dock Ward; 1 iron falcon; 2 cast iron sakers.
    - Mount at the Bridge
    - Store house on the Green, called the chapel.
    - Base court within God's House walls, (Domus Dei church, Royal Garrison Church)
      - Block carriages in Base court.
    - Powder house within.
    - Munitions in the church at God's House; 120 iron saker shot 3 inch; 210 iron saker shot 3.25 inch; 160 iron falcon shot 2 inch; 290 brass minion shot 3 inch shot; 90 old iron saker shot 2.75 inch; etc.
      - Chancel of God's House church.
      - Vestry there; powder and 2 latten (pewter) ladles for culverins.
      - Munitions for fire work in the church.
    - Armoury; 526 pairs of Almain rivets with splints and sallets (light German armour, breast and back plates, arm pieces and helmets).
    - Loft over the Armoury; 175 hagbuts; 140 broken hugbuts and demi-hacks; 180 Moorish pikes; etc.
    - Hasillworth Castle; 1 cast-iron demi-culverin of Parson Levette's making; 1 cast-iron saker the same maker; shot & powder.
    - Portsmouth Bridge; 2 iron serpentines; 2 iron falcons; shot & powder.
    - Portsmouth Tower, under John Ridley, gent; 2 brass sakers; 1 brass falcon; 3 iron fowlers one broken; 60 three-inch iron saker shot; 300 two-inch falcon shot; 40 ready hewn stone shot; powder, bows, bills etc.
    - South Castle at Portsmouth, John Chadderton; 1 brass cannon called a 'Bullen piece'; 1 brass demi-cannon of old make; 1 brass culverin; 1 brass minion; 1 French brass saker; 1 brass falconet; 1 brass culverin; 1 iron demi-culverin made by Peter Bonde (Pierre Baude); 2 iron sakers made by Parson Levetts; 1 iron falcon made by Parson Levetts; 2 iron slings; 2 iron port pieces; 1 irom mortar made by Paron Levetts; 1 worthless iron fowler; 1 worthless iron serpentine; shot, bows bills etc.
    - Lymden's Bulwark by the West Haven, under Captain John Lymden.
- Isle of Wight;
  - Yarmouth Castle, under Captain Richard Ewdall; 12 cannon, 19 hagbuts, 140 bows, 223 bills.
  - Sharpenode blockhouse, under Nicholas Cheke; 1 brass culverin; 1 brass saker; 21 demi-culverins.
  - Carisbrook Castle, under Richard Worsley, gent; 5 cannon; 140 hagbuts; 21 chests of bows; 500 Moorish pikes; 184 javelins; 750 bills.
  - Sandhambay Castle, under Captain Peter Smythe; 11 cannon; a chest of bows; 150 pikes; 120 bills.
  - West Cowe Castle, under Captain Robert Raymond; 19 cannon; 19 chests of bows; 22 pikes; 20 bills.
- Kent;
  - Deal Castle; 1 brass cannon; 3 brass demi-cannons; 1 brass culverin; 2 brass sakers; 1 brass falcon;10 iron bases; 7 port-pieces; 5 slings; 19 hagbuts a croke; 8 demi-hacks; 87 bows; 242 bills; 160 pikes; transferred to the Mary Hamborough at Dover, a port-piece, 1 sling and a barrel of powder.
  - Dover Castle, John Monynges; 2 brass demi-culverins one unstocked; 1 brass demi-culverin; 6 sakers with old stocks; 15 hagbuts; 320 bows; 100 moorish pikes; 200 bills; 100 shovels and spades; a 'drie fatt' of 'Almain rivet', (a storage barrel with German light armour); 307 chainmail coats; 50 jacks (armoured coats).
    - The Black Bulwark in the cliff, under Robert Nethersole; iron slings; 4 hagbuts; 2 bows; 6 black bills.
    - The Bulwark under the Castle; 1 brass demi-culverin; 2 brass sakers; 1 brass falcon; 1 iron port piece; 3 iron hagbuts a croke.
    - Archcliff beside Dover Pier, (Moody's bulwark), Captain Edmund Mondye (Moody); 1 demi-culverin; 2 brass sakers; 1 brass falcon; 1 iron falcon; 3 single serpentines; 12 iron bases; 4 hagbuts; 20 moorish pikes; 50 black bills; archery accessories but no bows listed.
    - Black Bulwark at Dover Pier, Captain Edmund Mondye; 1 iron basilisk; 1 brass culverin; 1 brass demi-culverin; 6 iron port pieces; 3 iron slings; 7 iron bases; 5 demi-slings.
  - Gravesend Bulwark; 1 iron bombard; 2 demi-culverins on carriages; 3 iron sakers on carriages; 1 falcon of iron; 1 brass robinet; 6 double bases; 7 single bases; 4 iron hagbuts; 20 handguns; 12 iron 'flankers', 3 broken; 1 quarter sling with two blowing (backfiring) chambers; 1 port piece with 2 boken chambers; 25 bows; 18 black bills; 24 moorish pikes.
    - Milton Bulwark, Captain William Burston; 1 iron bombard; 2 iron demi-culverins on carriages; 2 iron sakers; 2 iron falcons one broken; 1 brass falcon; 6 iron fowlers, 5 chambers blown; 5 quarter slings; 5 double bases; 6 single bases; 6 iron hagbuts; 11 hailshot pieces; 16 handguns; 20 yew bows; 24 black bills; 16 moorish picks.
    - Higham Bulwark, Captain John Yardley; 1 demi-cannon on trindles; 2 iron sakers on wheels; 1 iron saker on trindles; 1 brass falcon on wheels; 1 iron jerfalcon on wheels; 1 iron bombard on trindles, with 2 unfit chambers; 1 iron quarter sling with broken stock; 1 iron quarter sling all parts broken; 4 iron double bases; 5 iron sling bases, without any iron shot; 4 iron hagbuts; 20 handguns with their boxes and 4 bullet moulds each; 12 iron hail shot murderers; 20 yew bows; 20 black bills, hefts mostly rotten; 18 moorish pikes
  - Harwich, 3 blockhouses;
    - Tower Blockhouse; 6 bases; 1 brass saker; 10 hacks; 8 hagbuts; 4 three-quarter slings; 1 fowler; 4 hedging bills; 1 sling; 4 port pieces; 26 bows; 16 bills; 18 Moorish pikes.
    - Middle Blockhouse; 1 culverin mounted on a carriage; 1 saker on a little carriage; 2 whole slings, both stocks broken; 3 quarter slings; 1 demi-sling; 1 fowler; 8 hagbuts, 1 broken; 32 livery bows; 18 Moorish pikes; 18 bills.
    - Harwich Hill Blockhouse; 1 brass demi-culverin; 2 brass sakers; 2 whole slings; 24 bows; 16 pikes; 17 bills; 4 hagbuts a croke; 2 whole hacks; 1 Portuguese base.
  - Queenborough Castle and Sheerness Blockhouse, Isle of Sheppey; 3 demi-cannons; 2 whole (full length) culverins; 2 port pieces; 3 fowlers, one unstocked; 2 whole slings; 2 half slings; 4 quarter slings; 49 Italian pieces (handguns), with flasks and 46 touch boxes; 72 moorish pikes; 57 bows; 52 bills; 4 sledgehammers; 7 pick-hammers.
  - Sandgate Castle, Folkestone, Captain Thomas Keis; 1 brass culverin unstocked; 1 rent (burst) falcon; 2 sakers, one broken one unstocked; 6 port pieces, one broken and the others unstocked without wooling; 6 serpentines, 2 unstocked; 1 double base; 8 hagbuts; 8 half hacks; 40 bows; 99 bills; 75 pikes.
  - Sandown Castle; 2 sakers; 1 falconet; 1 demi-culverin; 1 sling; 2 half slings; 7 serpentines; 2 port-pieces; 7 hagbuts; 6 half hacks; 100 pikes; a case of bows; 100 bills; 3 broken port pieces; 1 broken cannon with no stock.
  - Walmer Castle, Captain William Blechenden; 1 brass cannon; 1 demi-culverin; 1 brass falconet; 1 brass saker; 5 port pieces; 6 iron-slings; 8 serpentines; 8 hagbuts; 6 half hacks; 65 Moorish pikes; 66 black bills; 54 bows, 6 broken; 4 port pieces broken at the salute for the coming of the French admiral; 1 brass saker. Memo., the earth bulwarks in the downs are defaced.
- Nottingham Castle, Sir John Byrton; 1 brass falconet with a rotten carriage; 1 brass falconet with a good carriage; 8 iron bases with carriages but worthless forestocks; 12 chambers for bases; 350 old bows needing repair; 190 bills.
- Northumbria;
  - Bamborough; Warkworth; Dunstanborough; blank left in manuscript.
  - Alnwick Castle, under Robert Bowes; 5 brass falcons; 2 iron hagbuts a croke; 20 unserviceable hagbuts; 100 bills; 160 Moorish pikes; 60 sallets; 100 breast and backplates.
  - Berwick upon Tweed; fortified border town, on 28 December 1547, the fortifications were rebuilt over the next decade. Towers have gun positions on their 'heads,' and in lower chambers 'beneath.'
    - Storehouse or Ordnance house on the Green
      - Upper Chamber in the storehouse
      - Chambers in loft
      - Garret above the loft
    - Stable loft by the ordnance house
    - Forge at the Green; five damaged iron guns.
    - Storehouses at the Ness
    - Chamber over the carpenter's shop at the Ness
    - Storehouse under the leaden haulle
    - Gunpowder house in the leaden haulle
    - Cannon and small-arms in position on the walls of Berwick upon Tweed
      - Mylne hoole (Mill Hill); a brass falcon, a very old iron demi-sling.
      - Tower of St Margaret; 5 iron hagbuts.
      - Wall to the west of St Mary's Gate; a brass saker.
      - Brodstare Tower, beneath; 2 iron serpentines; 8 hagbuts.
      - At the 'dampned' (condemned) tower; a brass saker.
      - Walls at Wallas Tower; 3 brass sakers, an iron demi-sling.
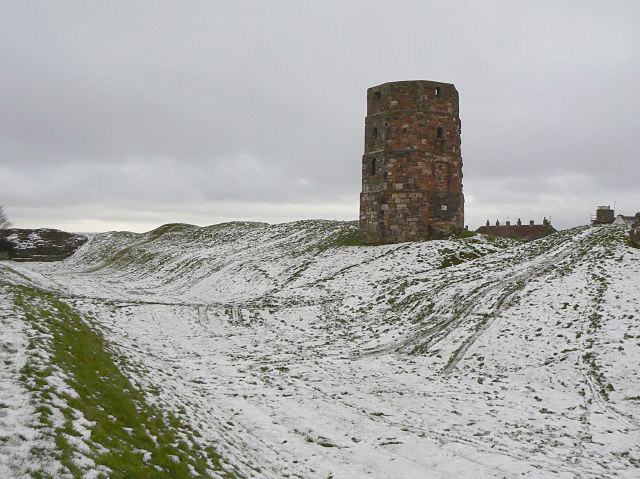
        Bell Tower at Berwick-upon-Tweed (rebuilt in 1577), and line of medieval wall
      - Bell Tower; a brass cannon, a brass culverin, 2 brass falcons. Beneath; a brass falconet, 5 iron port-pieces, 6 double-bases, 8 iron hagbuts.
      - Between the Bell Tower and Murtherer Tower; a brass falconet with 20 lead shot.
      - Murtherer Tower head; an organ pipe of brass. Beneath; 2 iron serpentines, 7 iron hagbuts.
      - Red Tower head; a brass falcon with 12 lead shot. Beneath; an iron serpentine, 6 iron hagbuts
      - Tower at the Cowgate; an iron serpentine, 7 hagbuts.
      - Tower head at St Nicholas's Ward; a brass sacre. Beneath; 2 iron serpentines.
      - Tower to south of the Cowgate; 2 iron serpentines; 7 hagbuts.
      - Tower head south of the postern; a brass falcon with 10 lead shot. Beneath; an iron serpentine.
      - Tower beneath over the Black Spout; an iron serpentine, 4 hagbuts.
      - Wind Mill Tower, beneath; an iron serpentine with 20 shot, 6 hagbuts.
      - St Nicholas's Tower head; a brass culverin, a brass falcon. Beneath; an iron serpentine, 20 hagbuts.
      - Black Watch Tower in the Water Ward, beneath; an iron serpentine, 30 hagbuts.
      - Tower in the Watch Tower; a brass falcon with 10 lead shot. Under; 2 iron serpentines, 6 hagbuts.
      - Walls south of the Watch House; a brass saker with 12 lead shot.
      - Plomer's Tower head; an iron single-base with 10 lead shot. Beneath; an iron serpentine, 5 hagbuts.
      - Bulwark on the sands; a brass falcon. Beneath; 2 iron serpentines, 12 hagbuts.
      - New Tower on the sands, head; a brass robinet with 10 lead shot.
      - At the Ness by the Millhouse; a brass saker.
      - At the shore on the sands; 2 iron culverins of cast unmounted; 3 iron port-pieces, 3 iron fowlers mounted on truckles.
      - Mason Dieu; an iron port piece.
      - Tower on the bridge at Berwick upon Tweed; 10 iron hagbuts with 30 lead shot and a bag of gunpowder.
    - Berwick Castle; 1 double cannon; 1 culverin; 2 sakers; 3 falcons; 3 falconets; 2 robinets; 2 bombards; 1 broken iron fowler, 2 quarter slings; 2 double bases; 3 single bases; 26 hagbuts; 30 bills; 40 unserviceable bows; 72 Moorish pikes.
  - Holy Island, Ralph Cleisbye; a wheel mounted demi-culverin; 2 brass sakers; a fixed demi-culverin.
  - Newcastle upon Tyne; 1 brass saker; 6 brass falcons; 1 falconets; 200 stocked and unstocked hagbuts for repair; 4 Portuguese bases; 40 small bases; 400 pikes; 2000 black bills; 250 demi-lances; 100 Northern staves; 80 pickaxes; 50 miners tools; 40 hedging bills; 20 privy wagons; 50 new carts; 6 old carts.
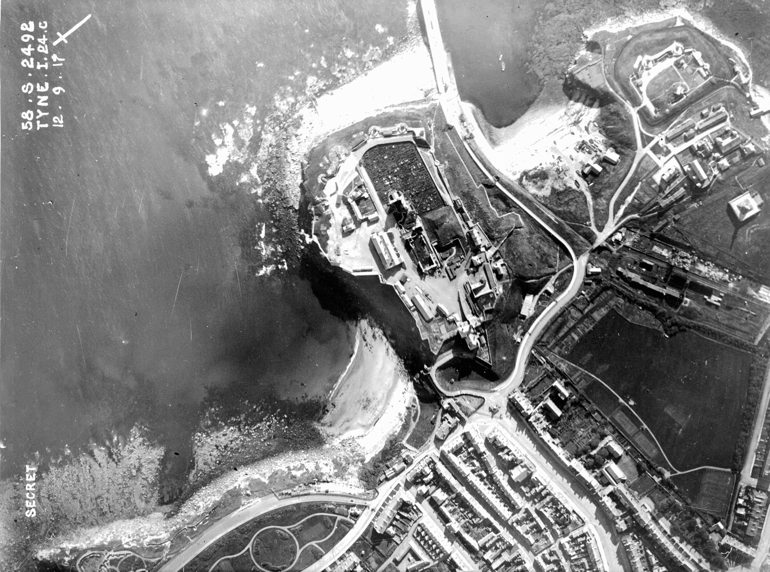
    Tynemouth Castle, aerial view in 1917, (Tyne & Wear Archives & Museums)
  - Tynemouth Castle, Sir Thomas Hilton; 2 brass double cannon; 1 cannon of 7 inch bore; 3 brass culverins on shod carriage; 2 brass saker on shod carriage; 4 brass falcons; 2 iron half slings on truckles; an engine for mounting ordnance with a block; 10 pots for wild fire; 72 yew bows; 170 moorish pikes; and 2 iron shovels for a lime kiln.
  - Wark Castle; Captain George Lawson; 1 brass culverin; 2 brass sakers; 6 iron falcon; 1 double base; 2 mounted bases; 1 single base; 1 sling; 1 port piece; 21 decayed hagbuts of croke; 24 bows; 22 bills; and remaining field cannon: 2 demi-cannon; 2 demi-culverin, with 40 shot each.
- Suffolk
  - Langar Point, Felixstowe; 2 bombards; 2 slings; 2 demi-slings; 1 great fowler; 1 small fowler; 2 bases; 8 hagbuts; 4 hacks; 3 quarter slings; 40 bows; 20 bills; 20 moorish pikes
  - Langar Road; 1 demi-culverin; 3 slings; 2 demi-slings; 2 quarter slings; 1 fowler; 2 Portuguese bases; 4 hagbuts a croke; 8 small hagbuts a croke; 1 broken sling; 1 broken port piece; 1 small broken hagbut; 40 bows.
  - Lowestoft; 2 iron slings; 2 iron demi-slings; 2 port pieces; 6 double serpentines; memo., the stocks and 2 chambers of the slings of the port pieces are decayed and broken.
- Sussex
  - Camber Castle, Philip Chowte, gentleman; 2 demi-cannon; 3 culverins; 1 demi-culverin; 1 saker; 1 falcon; 6 great mounted iron port pieces; 6 iron slings; 6 double bases; 300 yew bows; 460 bills; 180 pikes.
- Carlisle town and storehouse, Westmorland; 3 falcons; 1 pot gunn; 2 small port pieces; 5 fowlers; 21 bases; 1 hagbut on trindles; 14 hagbuts a croke; 41 hagbuts or handguns of which 26 need restocked and the rest repaired; 200 bows; 50 bills or halberds; 140 picks, mattocks and masons axes; 65 hammers; 9 crowbars; 70 serviceable spades; 1 old broken brass falcon; 2 broken hagbuts; 1 broken single base; 16 broken hagbuts or handguns; with items listed in the three places in the West March of Scotland.
  - Carlisle Citadel, Edward Aglionby, Esq; 2 mounted brass sakers which cannot be carried; 4 mounted brass falcons which cannot be carried; 2 iron fowlers on truckles; 2 pot guns on truckles, one not able; 2 single serpentines; 3 iron double bases; 8 single bases; 20 half hacks; 99 bills; 50 moorish pikes; 92 worthless yew bows.
  - Carlisle Castle, Sir John Lowther; 2 mounted sakers which cannot be carried; 4 falcons, 3 cannot be carried; 2 demi-bombards lacking truckles; 5 double bases; 3 single bases; 3 Portuguese bases; 93 worthless yew bows; 98 bills; 50 moorish pikes; 100 pots of wild fire; 39 half hacks; 2 mounted falconets which cannot be carried.
- Yorkshire;
  - Bridlington; 'nullus' (no return), no guns.
  - Flamborough Head; 1 brass falcon; 1 brass fowler; 1 demi-sling; 1 quarter-sling; 4 black bills.
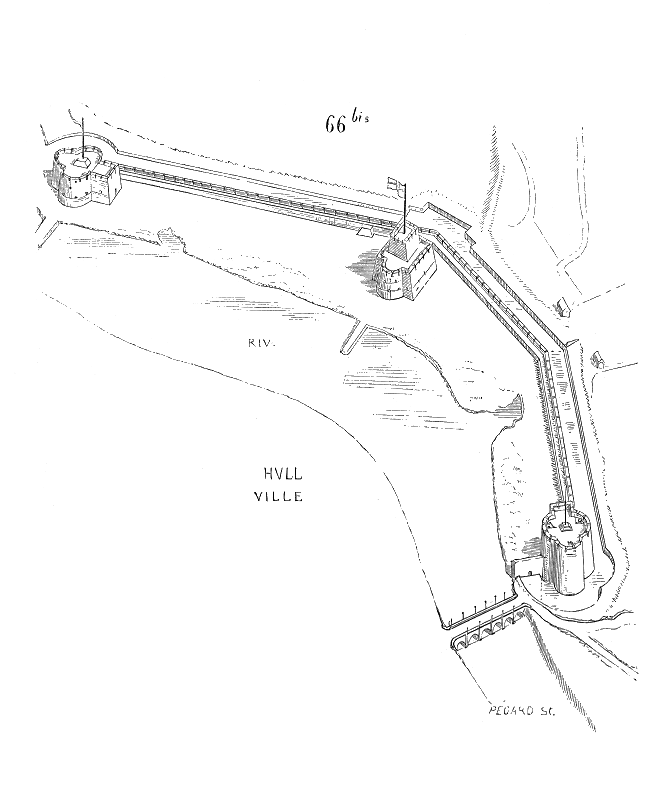
    Plan of Henry's fortifications at Kingston-upon-Hull
  - Kingston-upon-Hull;
    - Kingston Castle; 1 brass demi-culverin; 1 brass falcon; 1 brass falconet; 2 iron slings; 2 fowlers; 5 double bases; 2 single bases; 700 bows; 700 black bills; 20 Almain rivets with splints (arm protection) and sallets; 3 engines for mounting ordnance.
    - North blockhouse; 1 brass cannon; 1 brass falcon; 1 falconet; 2 iron port pieces; 2 fowlers; 4 double bases; 3 single bases; 9 bows; 20 bills.
    - South blockhouse; 1 basilisco; 1 demi-culverin; 1 cannon perrier; 1 falconet; 3 port pieces; 1 iron fowler; 3 double bases; 3 single bases; 3 bows; Memo., remains a brass falcon at Flamborough Head.
  - Pontefract Castle; 5 iron serpentines; 1 small brass falcon; 4 iron guns; 124 Almain rivets with 'tassets', (light German armour); 69 Almain rivets without tassets; 80 standards of mail; more armour, mail and weaponry; 13 bundles of archer's stakes; 90 field pails shod with iron.
  - Scarborough Castle; 1 broken brass saker; 1 port piece; 4 single bases; 3 bills; 3 bows.

==== France, Pale of Calais ====
- Calais, under Richard Blount, Master of the Ordnance in Calais.
  - Beauchamp quarter and Beauchamp bulwark, under John Fleming, quartermaster.
  - Devylin (or Dublin) quarter
    - New Bulwark in the Braies, George Falconer, quartermaster, (designed by Henry VIII in person in 1532)
    - Vault beneath the New Bulwark, 25 iron fowlers; 2 brass fowlers.
    - outside the New Bulwark; 2 brass cannon; 1 brass culverin; 3 brass sakers; 1 robinet; 1 iron fowler; 1 brass fowler; 29 iron hagbuts.
  - Prince's Inn quarter and Bulwark, under John London, quartermaster; 1 brass falcon; 3 iron fowlers; 14 iron hagbuts; 2 lanterns.
  - Bulleyn Well quarter, under William Ashton, quartermaster;
    - Bulleyn Brayes; 2 iron fowlers
    - The tower over Boulogne Gate (Bollengate).
  - Castle Hill quarter, under Piers Edge
  - Lanterngate quarter, under Thomas Hall.
  - West Brayes, under Bernard Burrow.
  - The Ordnance House; 220 great stone shot for bombards, whole and broken; 350 iron shot for cannon shot; 4000 great shot of diverse sorts, serving no piece.
    - Long Court; 3200 stone shot for port pieces.
    - Little court; 300 iron shot cannon shot; 200 iron demi-cannon shot.
    - Court within the gate; 70 iron serpentine cannon shot; 80 iron shot for Scottish cannon; 1200 iron culverin shot, many of nought; 440 iron shot for Nuremberg demi-culverin; lead, iron, 180 demi-cannon shot of the lowest sort, ends of Spanish, English and Flanders iron.
    - Great green yard; 1 great iron bombard; 2000 iron demi-cannon shot serving no piece; 1500 iron demi-culverin shot serving no piece; 400 iron saker shot serving no piece; a broken culverin, 7 great iron chambers serving no piece, etc.
    - Under the High Tower stair; 1100 demi-culverin shot.
    - Long gun House
    - Great gun House; 6 great iron port pieces; 6 black boottes; 2 great pillows of lead; 180 horse harness (armour) of English making, more tack etc.; 26 ton of elm timber for gun stocks; 20 pair of spare traces with collars of English make.
    - Shot house;
      - Casting vault; pair of tongs; pair of shears to cut shot.
      - Shot house Forge;
    - Wildfire House; 30 empty trunks; 30 Wild fire trunks; 100 wild fire hoops; 10 great wild fire casting pots of both sorts; 6 small wild fire casting pots; 7 balls with short staves; 2550 empty wild fire pots of both sorts; 40 wild fire pikes.
    - House above the stairhead
    - Cresset Loft
    - Coller Loft
    - Little Chamber next the Coller Loft
    - Spear Loft
    - Arrow Loft
    - Armoury; 6 helmets; 22 cuirasses without rests; 14 sallets with bavers; 100 sallets with visors and bavors; a sallet with 2 bullions of silver; 2 steel bonnets; 12 pairs of gauntlets; 32 pairs of leg harness; 36 pairs of splints (arm protection); 19 pairs of brigandines; etc.
    - Handgun Chamber
    - Malle chamber
    - Longbow chamber; 1500 long bows of all sorts.
    - Crossbow Chamber; 98 crossbows called 'rods'; 12 crossbows called 'lathes'; 120 windlasses for them; 14 benders for small crossbows; archery accessories, sal ammoniac, asafoetida, quick silver, green copperas, rosalgere, camphor, etc.
    - Saltpetre House; 63 barrels of powdered sulphur mostly of no value; 4 hogsheads of rock sulphur; 120 firkins of powdered sulphur, faulty; a barrel of powdered sulphur; 7 pipes of rock saltpetre; 40 barrels of old coal powder; 40 lbs of oakum or tow, rotten; 14 cartouches (cartridges) with powder for demi-culverins; 60 empty cartouche bags; 20 funnels to load chambers; etc.
    - Iron House; 180 iron hagbuts with tails; 39 brass hagbuts; 60 stocked Bohemian hagbuts; 17 small bases; 1200 great spikes or long nails; more nails, chains, tools, and iron and lead weights up to 150 lb with scales, etc.
    - Great Vault; 1 firkin of train oil; 3 hogsheads of vinegar; 1 firkin of olive oil; etc.
    - Great storehouse by the Ordnance House; 3 brass mortar guns with rotten stocks; 1 brass mortar for grinding powder.
      - Powder House at the Great Storehouse; 8 long trays for drying powder; 8 small trays.
    - Moorish pike House; 1600 Moorish pikes; 60 chests with locks for bows and arrows.
    - Long house beneath the Pike House
    - The other House there
    - Mill House; horse-mill to grind powder; 2 brass bottoms with elm mortars; 2 hand mills for corn.
    - Foundry; 3 port pieces; 7 unstocked iron mortar guns; 2 single serpentines; 2 whole iron pieces mounted on wheels; 4 iron fowlers; 2 broken brass robinets; 1 iron demi-sling; 1 broken great bombard.
      - Work House; 6 pairs of cannon wheels; 3 pairs of shod culverin wheels; etc.
      - Forge
      - Iron House; 7000 horseshoes; 48000 horse nails; etc.
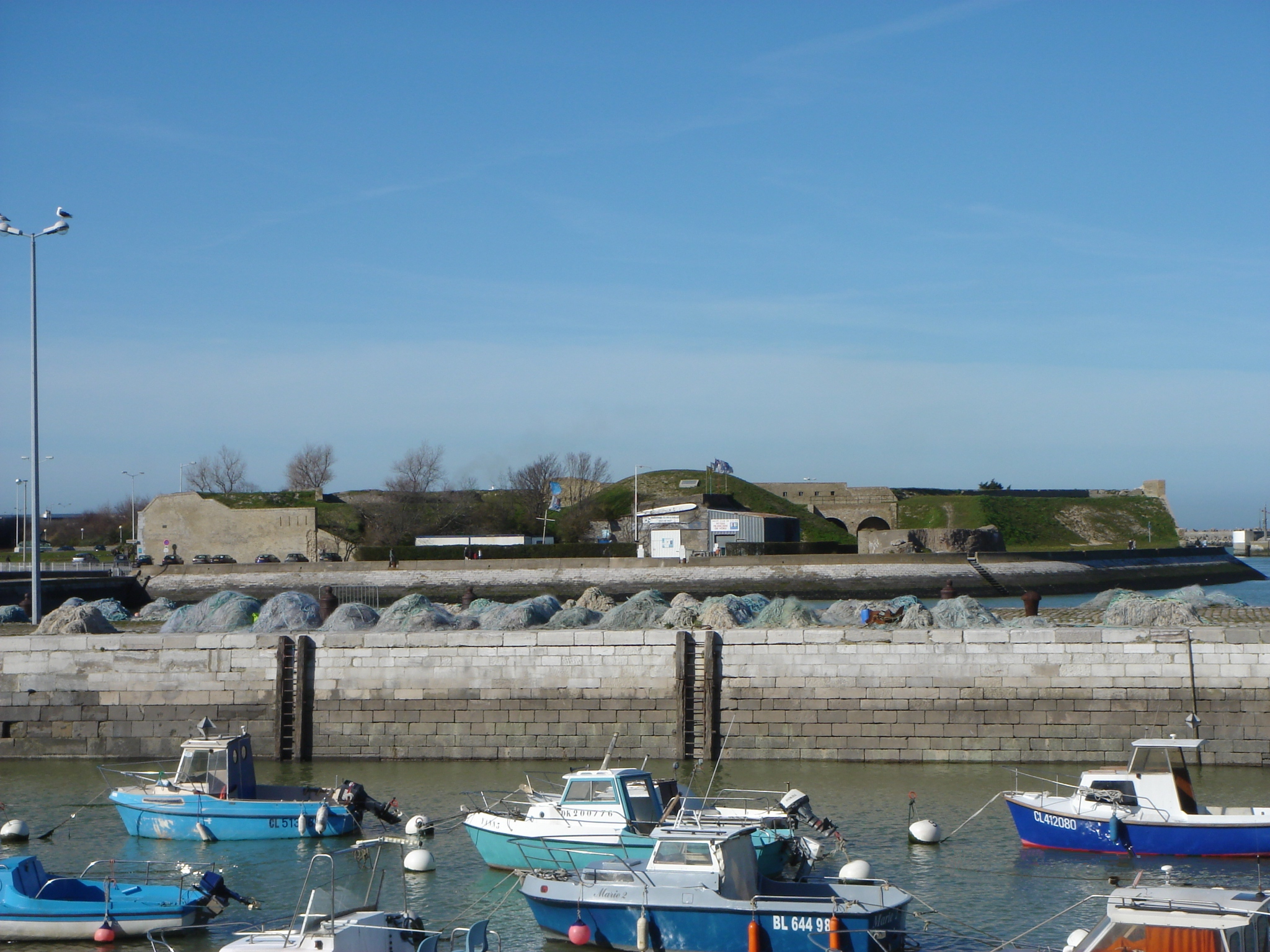
        Fort Risban at Calais, Henry's Ruysbank Castle
  - Ruysbank Castle, (Fort Risban), Sir George Somerset; 2 brass culverins on wheels; 2 demi-culverins complete; 3 brass sakers complete; 1 brass falconet complete; 1 iron culverin; 1 iron falcon; 10 iron fowlers; 4 iron quarter slings; 6 iron bases; 12 iron Bohemian hagbuts; 16 iron hagbuts with tails; 1 brass hagbut; 28 demi-hacks, many with broken accessories; 7 handguns of which two have been unready; 20 bows; 50 moorish pikes; 40 bills.
  - Calais Castle, under Sir Edward Braye.
    - Bullingham bulwark, Calais marshes.
    - Bootes bulwark, Calais marshes
    - Harway (Harraway's) bulwark, in the Calais marshes
- Boulogne, recently besieged; totals: 4 cannons; 5 demi-cannons; 10 culverins; 14 demi:-culverins; 18 sakers; 21 falcons, falconets, and chamber falcons; 25 great brass mortars; 19 small brass mortars; 9 iron mortars; 3 iron bombards; 3 iron cannon-perrier; 16 port-pieces; 24 fowlers; 7 slings; 12 double bases; 54 shrimp bases; 114 privy bases; 2 robinets; 73 brass hagbuts. Memo., most of the wheels and stocks are rotten and decayed.
  - High Boulogne
    - East part; a cannon; 2 culverins; 2 demi-culverins; 2 sakers; 1 falconet; 7 small brass mortars; 5 brass hagbuts; 1 port piece; 2 privy bases; 1 bombard; 2 cannon-perrier.
    - West part; 2 cannons; 1 demi-cannon; 2 sakers; 1 falcon; 3 great brass mortars; 4 small mortars; 6 brass hagbuts; 13 privy bases; 4 double bases; 4 shrimp bases; 1 great iron mortar; 1 cannon-perrier.
    - South part; a cannon; 1 demi-cannon; 1 culverin; 2 demi-culverins; 2 sakers; 2 great brass mortars; 6 brass hagbuts; 4 double bases; 2 shrimp bases; 6 privy bases; 1 bombard.
    - North part; a culverin; 2 demi-culverins; 1 chambered falcon; 3 great brass mortars; 6 brass hagbuts; 1 fowler; 3 shrimp bases; 1 privy base.
    - Boulogne Castle; a demi-cannon; 2 culverins; 3 demi-culverins; 4 sakers; 2 chambered falcons; 1 falconet; 2 small brass mortars; 2 robinets; 25 brass hagbuts; 2 port pieces; 2 fowlers; 2 demi-slings; 5 shrimp bases.
    - Platform on Our Lady Church; a saker; 1 falcon.
    - Palace; 14 great brass mortars.
    - High Boulogne store house; 80 handguns; 900 longbows; 3500 Moorish pikes; 400 demi-lances; 450 Northern staves; 1200 black bills; 300 Northern stave heads; 2000 horseshoes; 200 reap-hooks alias sickles; 205 hedging bills; 200 Almain rivets (light German armours); 4 double bases; 4 new Bohemian hacks; etc.
  - Base Boulogne
  - The Old Man of Boulogne, (originally a Roman lighthouse); a demi-cannon; 3 brass culverins; 3 brass demi-culverins; 3 brass sakers; 6 brass falcons; 6 brass chamber falcons; 3 great brass mortars; 1 iron bombard; 2 iron slings; 5 iron port pieces; 2 fowlers; 5 iron port pieces; 2 fowlers; 48 iron privy bases; 12 shrimp bases; 30 handguns; 68 longbows; 388 Moorish pikes; 59 black bills; 4 great balls of wildfire; 50 small balls of firework; 3 pikes for firework; 6 trunks of firework; 100 Almain rivets (light German armours).
  - Boulogne Barghe, or Boulemberg, (Mount Lambert); 1 demi-cannon; 2 demi-culverins; 1 brass saker; 4 brass whole falcons; 18 brass hagbuts; 5 brass mortars; 1 iron cannon-perrier; 6 iron port pieces; 8 iron fowlers; 2 iron slings; 18 iron privy bases; 16 shrimp bases; 3 Bohemian hacks; 80 furnished handguns; 30 longbows; 100 Almain rivets; a smith's forge, complete; shot etc.
- Guînes Town
  - Guînes Castle
- Newhaven, Ambleteuse, a five bastioned star fort with an outpost at Blackness. Stourton was its commander.
  - Bourcher's mount; a small port piece with 2 chambers; 1 iron fowler with 2 chambers.
    - The mount; a demi-culverin of brass, wheels rotten; 1 brass saker; 1 brass falcon; 1 brass falconet; 1 iron saker; 1 iron sling mounted on wheels; 1 fowler; 4 single bases.
    - Flankers by the gate
  - Water mount
    - Flanker towards the gate
  - Stourton's Mount
    - Flanker towards Berkeley's mount; a port piece; 1 fowler.
    - Flanker towards Bell mount; 3 fowlers with 6 chambers.
  - Bell mount or Town Mount.
    - Flanker towards Water Mount; 3 fowlers with 2 chambers.
    - Flanker towards Berkeley's Mount; 2 iron fowlers with 4 chambers.
  - Berkeley's Mount; a brass demi-cannon; 1 brass culverin; 1 brass saker; 1 brass falconet; 1 iron saker; 3 single bases with 7 chambers.
    - Flanker towards Bell Mount; a small port with 2 chambers; 2 fowlers with 2 chambers.
    - Mount and Flanker towards Stourton's Mount; 3 fowlers with 2 chambers each.
    - Flanker towards Bourcher's Mount; 4 fowlers with 7 chambers.
  - Market place; a brass demi-cannon.
  - Newhaven Ordnance House
- Blackness bulwark, Cap Gris Nez near Ambleteuse; 1 demi-culverin sling; 6 iron sakers; 2 brass minions; 3 iron falconets; 7 port pieces; 9 fowlers; 12 double bases; 4 single bases; 2 hagbuts; 19 hagbuts a croke; 80 complete arquebuses; 4 chests of bows; 300 pikes; 9 horseman's staves.
- Newneham Bridge, (Fort Nieulay); 1 brass demi-culverin; 1 whole culverin of brass; 4 brass sakers; 1 brass falconet; 1 brass organ pipe; 1 whole iron sling; 5 iron demi-slings, 2 at Calais for restocking; 6 iron fowlers; 4 iron double bases; 6 demi-cart bases of iron; 20 croke bases; 30 iron tailed hagbuts; 5 Bohemian hagbut on stocks; 6 trunks of wild fire; 6 pikes of wild fire; 20 handguns all furnished; 40 bows; 40 Moorish pikes; 100 black bills.
- Hammes Castle; 1 brass demi-culverin; 1 brass saker; 4 brass falcons, 1 broken; 3 brass falconets; 2 brass fowlers, not good; 12 iron fowlers; 1 iron demi-sling; 2 iron port pieces; 4 Portuguese bases; 11 stocked Bohemian hagbuts; 18 iron hagbuts with tails, 4 broken; 23 demi-hacks of little worth; 2 broken brass robinets; 25 wild fire pikes; 6 wild fire trunks; 28 wild fire garlands; 20 wild fire balls; 22 wild fire faggots; 30 wild fire casting pots; 100 empty pots for unslaked lime or wild fire; 25 good bows; 30 worthless bows; 1 steel crossbow weighing 9-lb; 21 chasing staves; 2 Northern gads; 30 spades; 10 mattocks; 25 Moorish pikes; 60 black bills; 150 field stakes; etc.

==== Scotland ====
- West March, in Dumfrieshire;
  - Laird of Johnstone's house at Lochwood Tower; 3 double bases, one broken; 1 iron sling. Items from Carlisle armoury; 3 single bases, 1 broken; 1 iron double sling; 9 hagbuts or handguns.
  - Castlemilk; 2 half hacks; 8 handguns. Items from the Carlisle armoury; 2 half hacks; 8 hagbuts or handguns.
  - Cockpool (near Comlongon), 5 hagbuts upon crock; 8 handguns; 1 half hack. Items from the Carlisle armoury; 5 hagbuts a croke; 8 handguns; 1 half hack.
- Broughty Castle, Fife delivered 12 January 1548; 100 hand-guns with flasks, touch-boxes, bullet-moulds and matches. Powder and shot were delivered for the navy in the Firth of Forth at the same time, with 100 yew bows and 30 hagbuts.
- Eyemouth, Berwickshire, Scotland; Captain Thomas Gower; 1 brass saker; 1 brass falcon; 4 iron fowlers; 16 yew bows; 30 Moorish pikes; 20 black bills. New munitions supplied in January 1548 included 2 iron demi-culverins, 2 iron fowlers, and 20 sheaves of arrows.
- Hume Castle, Berwickshire; 2 demi-culverins; 1 bastard-saker; 2 falconets; 2 fowlers; 8 single bases; 6 hagbuts a croke; 40 hagbuts; a chest of bows; 19 pikes; 20 bills; 2 crow-bars; 46 shovels; 4 pick-axes.
- Roxburgh, Roxburghshire, Scotland; 2 iron demi-culverins; 3 iron sakers; 1 iron falcon; 3 port pieces; 1 fowler; 6 bases; 6 small bases; 24 bows.
- Inchcolm Island; Firth of Forth, one culverin; one demi-culverin; 3 iron sakers; a brass saker; 2 iron falcons; 3 brass falcons; 4 fowlers; 2 port pieces; 14 bases; 90 arquebuses, 2 chests of bows; 3 chests of arrows whereof many spent; 50 pikes; and 40 bills.
