= John Bate (tailor) =

John Bate was a specialist textile worker who made farthingales for Elizabeth I.

== Career ==
Elizabeth's tailor Walter Fyshe made some of Queen Elizabeth's farthingales. A farthingale is a support designed to increase the volume of a skirt. He used hoops made of "bent", a rope made from a kind of grass or reed, covered with buckram. John Bate was first mentioned as a maker of farthingales for Queen Elizabeth in 1567. A royal wardrobe warrant describes him as a "verthingale maker". He also made the foreparts of skirts which were visible. He repaired or augmented older garments, and supplied a hamper suitable for carrying two farthingales.

== Robert Sibthorpe and Robert Hughes ==
Bate was recorded making farthingales for Elizabeth in 1570, and subsequently the work was given to Robert Sibthorpe. Sibthorpe's work, like Bate's, included remodelling old garments. In 1571 he was paid for "unrippinge and newe making of a Vertingale" and then for "two several tymes translatinge" the same farthingale.

Robert Hughes may have worked with Sibthorpe, and in 1593 when he was made a free man of the Drapers' Company was described as the "Queens Vardingsall maker". After the Union of the Crowns in 1603, Hughes made farthingales for Anne of Denmark, queen consort of James VI and I.
