= Walter Fyshe =

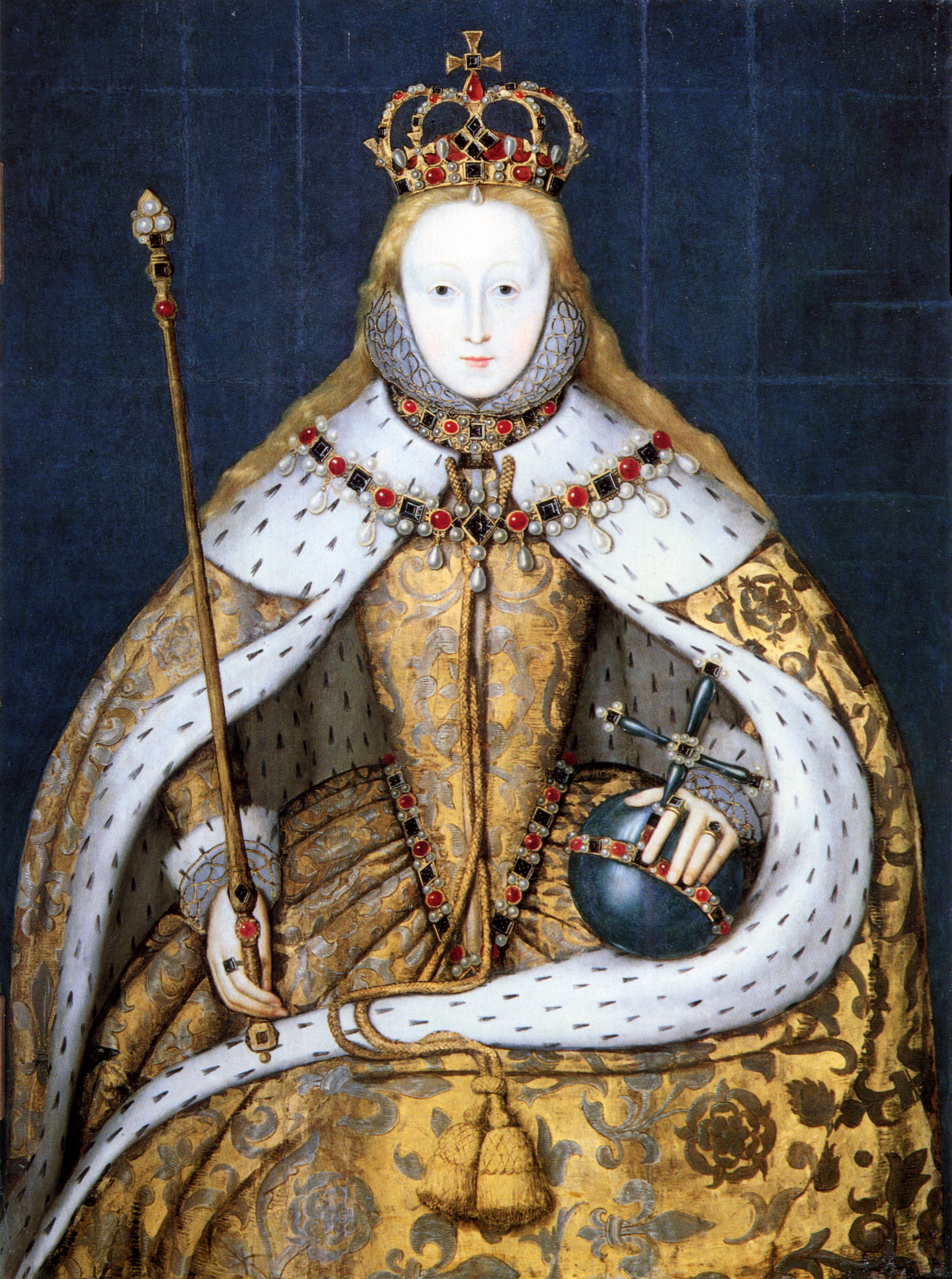
Elizabeth I in coronation robes

Walter Fyshe (died 1585) was a London tailor who worked for Elizabeth I until 1582. He also made some of her farthingales. Fyshe made the queen's ceremonial clothes and coronation robes, altering robes made for the coronation of Mary I of England. His name is sometimes spelled "Fish".

== Career ==
Walter Fyshe married Elizabeth Worthington (died 1610) in November 1547. He is sometimes said to have worked for Mary I of England and for Princess Elizabeth before her accession in 1558, but the evidence is unclear. He appears in the account books of Bess of Hardwick in 1549.

Fyshe was a member of the Merchant Taylor's Company. Fyshe was sometimes asked to adjudicate disputed tailor's bills. He inspected the accounts of a tailor called Molde who had made clothes for Anne, the wife of Henry Mewtas (a son of Peter Meutas), in 1566. The case note mentions that Fyshe lived in Budge Row.

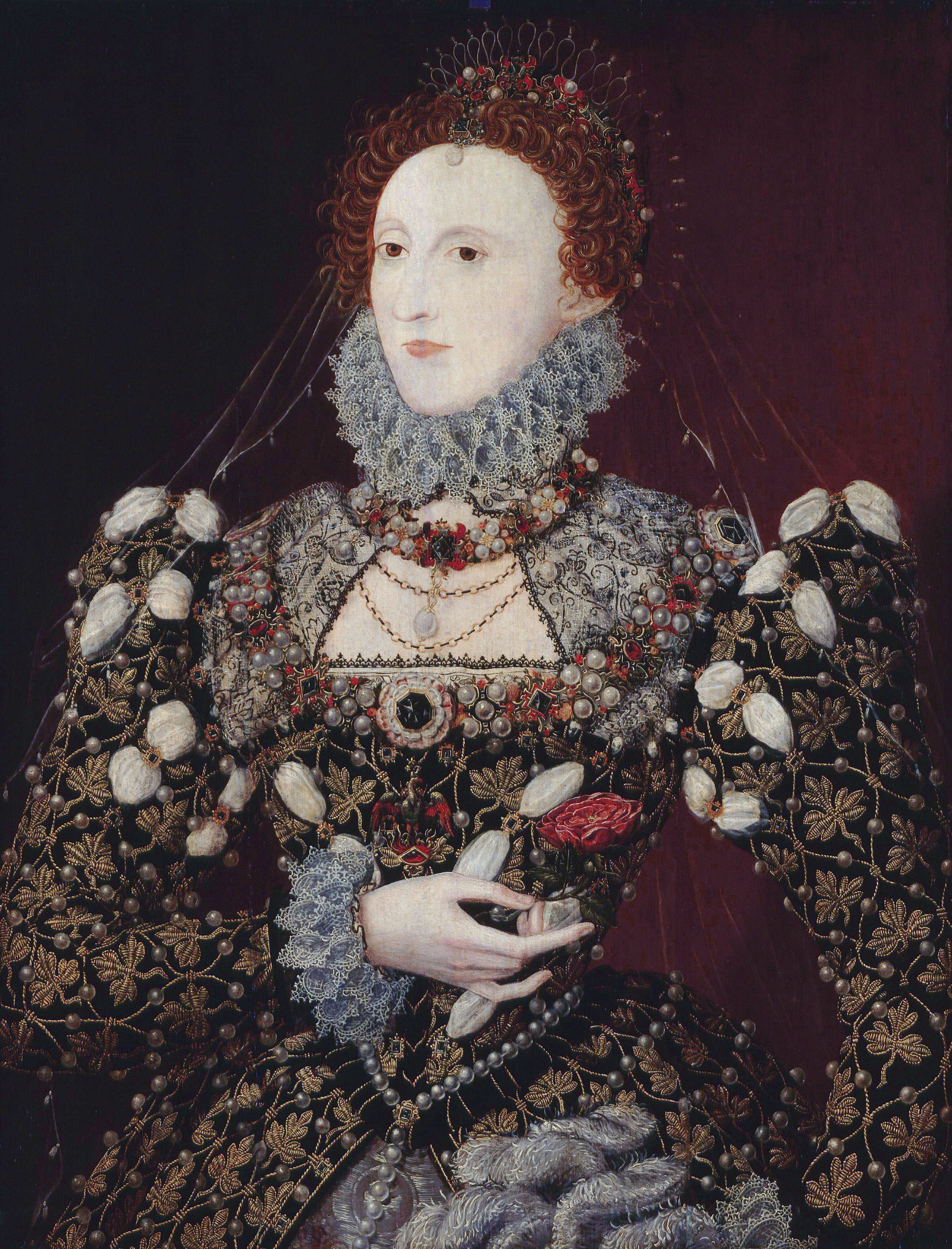
Elizabeth I by Nicholas Hilliard, the tailoring of the gown shows French influence

In 1565, Fyshe made gowns for six maids of honour to wear at the wedding of Anne Russell to the Earl of Warwick. The gowns of yellow satin guarded with green velvet dressed with silver lace were made for Mary Howard, Anne Windsor, Katherine Brydges, Katherine Knyvett, Mary Radcliffe, and Dorothy Broke. A black velvet gown made in 1578 for Frances Vaughan (a maid of honour, daughter of John Vaughan and a relation of Blanche Parry) was decorated with broad and narrow "lases of Venice silver", these laces were decorative strips or braids woven from metallic thread. The laces and other "garnishments" were supplied by the Queen's silkwoman.

Some garments made for Elizabeth involved the use of patterns called "toiles" which were sent to France for completion. Some clothes were partly made in France and finished by Fyshe. Elizabeth was interested in the fashions of other European courts, and in 1567 the ambassador Henry Norris was asked to recruit a tailor in Paris who could make apparel in the Italian and French manner. Although Norris's wife Margery Williams, who Elizabeth nicknamed "Crow", agreed to help find a craftsman, no candidates were found. The costume historian Janet Arnold suggests that the gown worn by Elizabeth in the 'Phoenix' portrait painted by Nicholas Hilliard may represent a pattern sent from France, possibly by Lady Norris, made up by Fyshe.

After 1567, Elizabeth's farthingales were made a specialist, John Bate. Fyshe made a cloak and safeguard riding overskirt for Bess of Hardwick to give to the queen, for New Year's Day 1577. In February 1569, George Brediman, keeper of the wardrobe at Westminster, supplied Fyshe by warrant with "murray" coloured satin for a "straight bodied gown" and "patterns of gardings" for the Queen, and "purple cloth of silver with works" for a French kirtle and crimson cloth of gold tissue with gold and silver for a train for a French kirtle.

In 1574 Fyshe was made a yeoman of the Revels. Work for the Revels included costumes for musicians and actors dressed as Amazons for a masque at Richmond Palace in January 1579. Amazons and knights arrived at the Palace, danced with the audience, and fought. Fyshe bought coal to air the stored Revels costumes. He frequently signed the Revels accounts as "Walter Fysshe", and was responsible for buying fabrics for costumes, accessories, and stage properties.

Elizabethan courtiers agonised about giving the correct New Year's Day gifts to the queen to win favour. In 1575, Lady Sussex advised Elizabeth Wingfield, the wife of the gentleman usher Anthony Wingfield, that an embroidered cloak of peach or blue watchet colour and a safeguard skirt would be a good choice, especially if "Waltare Fyeses to have the dowynge of it". The clothes were made and Elizabeth Wingfield wrote to Bess of Hardwick to tell her that Elizabeth I liked the "strange trimming of the garments".

Fyshe retired in 1582 and died in 1585. There are many records of his work at the English court. His will mentions a gift of a gold mourning ring to an embroiderer Davy Smith. Fyshe married Elizabeth Worthington in 1547. She outlived him. Their son, Cornelius Fyshe was admitted to Gray's Inn in August 1592.

== Clothes for courtiers ==
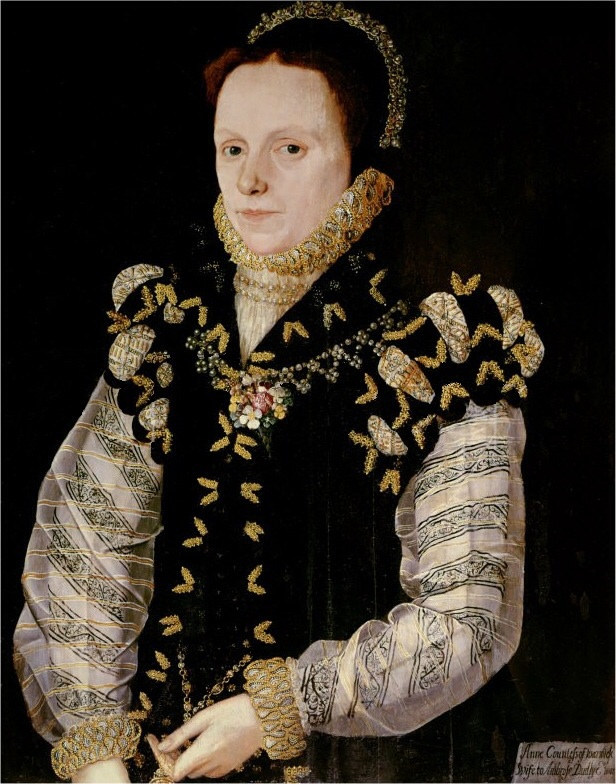
Walter Fyshe made clothes for maids of honour at the wedding of Anne Russell, Countess of Warwick

Walter Fyshe and his workshop made clothes for Elizabeth's maidens of honour, ladies of the privy chamber and bedchamber, and chamberers. He made gowns of yellow satin with green velvet edging and silver lace for six maids of honour to attend the wedding of Anne Russell, daughter of the Earl of Bedford, to Ambrose, Earl of Warwick, on 11 November 1565. The maids were "Mistress Mary Howarde, Anne Windesoure, Katherine Bridges, Katherin Knevit, Mary Ratlyf and Dorothy Broke".

Eleven gowns of crimson velvet, blue taffeta, and murrey satin, trimmed with sky blue "watchet" and white lace, were gifts from Elizabeth in 1572 to "Lady Susan Bowser, Mary Ratclyff, Eleaner Bridges, Elizabeth Garrett, Katheryn Howarde, Ysabell Holcrofte, Fraunces Howarde, Elizabeth Knolles, Anne Weste, Elizabeth Stafforde, and Mary Shelton".

Some women received clothes when they married. In 1567, Dorothy Bradbelt, a gentlewoman of the chamber, was given a Flanders gown of black velvet with satin made by Fyshe when she married John Habington, a clerk of the royal kitchen.

== Fyshe and the Royal Wardrobes ==
George Brediman had responsibility for the Wardrobe of Robes. Several royal warrants directed to Brediman survive, referring both to the wardrobe at Whitehall or at Westminster. At this time, the same store was meant. Brediman issued textiles for revels, to Katherine Astley for the queen's use, and to Walter Fyshe.
