= George Brediman =

Courtier in Tudor England

George Brediman or Bredyman or Brideman (died 1580) was an English courtier serving Mary I of England and Elizabeth I. Brediman was a groom of the privy chamber, keeper of the privy purse, and keeper of the Palace of Westminster. His wife, Edith Brediman, was a chamberer at court. In 1556, he married Edith Brocas or Brokwesse (died 1590), one of Mary's chamberers.

== Courtier of Mary I ==
Mary made Brediman Keeper of the Royal Park of Freemantle near Hannington and Kingsclere with an allowance to feed the wild animals in winter. She gave him various rewards, including, in 1557, the manor of Podington, a part of the Honour of Ampthill, and a lease of Brook Hall at Tolleshunt Knights. Brediman was granted the custody and ward of Edmund Brockelsby (died 1565), heir of the manor of Glentworth in July 1557, and was granted the custom duties from the markets and fairs of three Welsh border townships, Builth, Presteigne, and Elvell.

=== Brediman and the royal tapestry ===
Mary also allowed Brediman to use some verdure tapestry of the "broad bloom" with birds and apples and another suite of verdure featuring roses and pomegranates in the corners. The pomegranate was an emblem of Catherine of Aragon. Some rose and pomegranate borders may have been produced by Cornelius van der Strete or made by makers in centres including Enghien. Tapestry, with corner pomegranates, roses, apples, and "pots", was listed in 1547 in the inventory of Henry VIII at Oatlands Palace.

Several pieces of a suite of tapestry of the "broad bloom" featuring apples and pomegranates were held by the wardrobe of Lady Elizabeth in 1547, and at least one related piece of tapestry with corner pomegranates is thought to survive.

== During Elizabeth I ==
Mary I made him Keeper of Westminster Palace, and York Place, with the houses occupied by the armourer Hans Hunter and the goldsmith Everard Everdyes, the gardens and orchards, and a tennis court. This included responsibility for the Wardrobe of Robes (as a successor to Arthur Stourton). He continued as Keeper for Elizabeth I. Several royal warrants directed to Brediman survive, referring both to the wardrobe at Whitehall or at Westminster. At this time, the same store was meant.

In October 1559, Brediman sent £3000 to Ralph Sadler at Berwick-upon-Tweed. Sadler was to use the money to reward any Scottish people who might further peace with England. Brediman issued textiles for the queen's use, and to the queen's tailor Walter Fyshe. Brediman issued copes and vestments from the wardrobe to Kat Ashley, chief gentlewoman of the bedchamber to Elizabeth I in December 1560. By the same warrant, fabrics were requested for "masking garments" to be sent to Thomas Benger, Master of the Revels.

In February 1569, Brediman supplied cloth by warrant to Elizabeth's tailor Walter Fyshe and sable furs to her furrier Adam Bland. A 1578 warrant for fabrics for masque costume from Brediman's store at Westminster signed by Edward Buggyn and the tailor Walter Fyshe includes "russet gold tinsel, crimson cloth of gold with work, purple silver tinsel "mayled", crimsom gold "bodkin" raised, cloth of silver striped with black silk, orange coloured velvet". Brediman supplied cloth for the costumes used in The Masque of Amazons performed at Richmond Palace on 11 January 1579.

George Brediman died in 1580. Thomas Knyvet became Keeper of Westminster Palace and the Wardrobe of Robes.

He was survived by his wife Edith, who lived at Tingrith, and a son Edmund. George Brediman was buried at St Martin-in-the-Fields, where his son Edmund had been baptised in 1561, and the previous keeper of Westminster Palace, Arthur Stourton, was buried in 1557. Edith Brediman was buried at St Edmund's Chapel in Westminster Abbey.
