= Everard Everdyes =

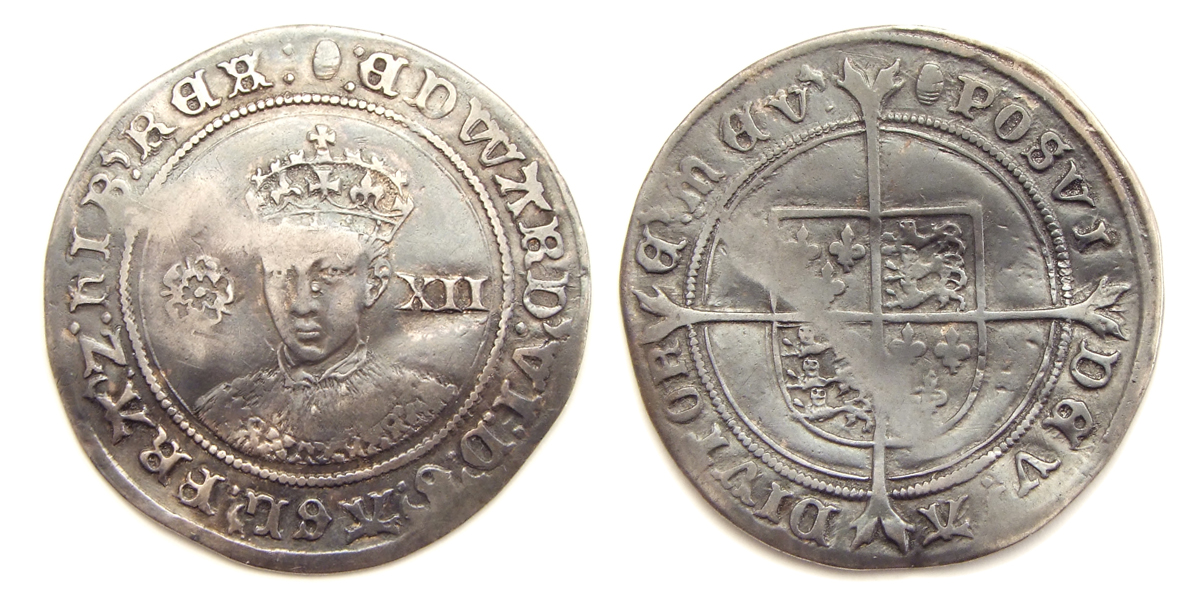
English shilling coin with a portrait of Edward VI

Everard or Everart Everdyes was a London-based goldsmith and precious stone cutter or lapidary who worked for Henry VIII, Edward VI, and Mary I of England. In 1546, with a merchant partner Peter Vanderwalle, he received a licence to import a variety of luxury goods. Like Vanderwalle, he may have learnt his trade and craft in Antwerp, and was allowed to settle in London with his family in 1546.

== The house at Westminster ==
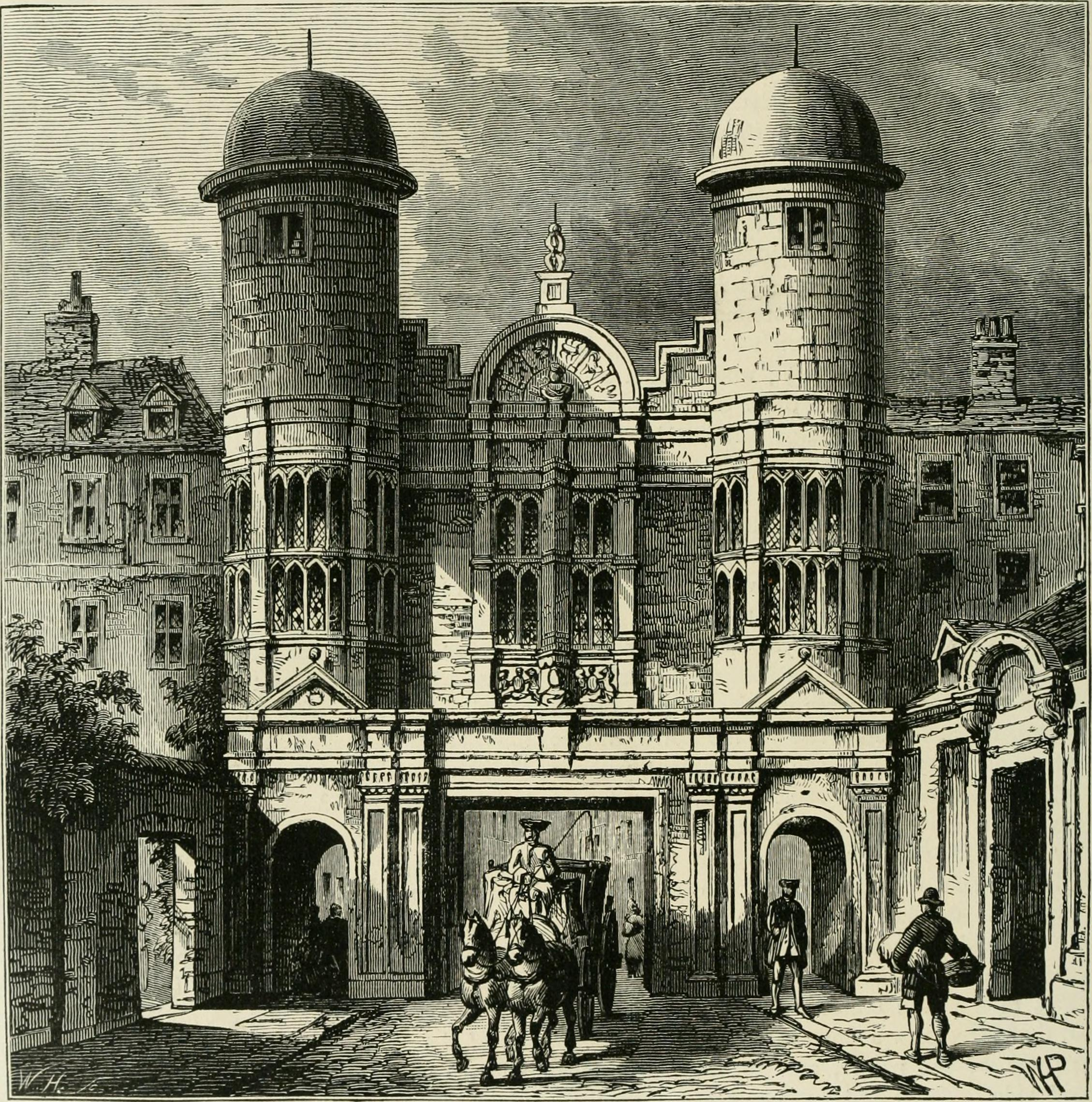
Everdyes's workshop was near the King Street Gate of Whitehall Palace, (demolished 1723)

In 1549, as a foreigner working in London, he was recorded as "Everyd Everdyse" or "Everdesse" with four servants in the Returns of Aliens for the parish of St Margaret's, Westminster. In 1550, at King's Street, Westminster, his employees were Stase Villmettes, Peter Dordyer, Peter Vanheste, and the apprentice Augustyne or Hanstren. Everdyes had a workshop and house at Westminster Palace. These premises, and the workshop of the armourer, Hans Hunter, were mentioned when Mary I made George Brediman Keeper of the Palace.

A property deed of 1604, made for Thomas Knyvet, names him as "Everard Everard", a former occupier of a house near the King Street Gate of Whitehall Palace, later the site of Hampden House and present day Downing Street.

== Works ==
Everdyes made cups for Henry VIII which included imported blue porcelain and ostrich eggs. Some of this work was unfinished at the death of Henry VIII and Everdyes returned the materials. He had re-cut a large sapphire.

Everdyes made one of three crowns for the coronation of Edward VI at the request of Protector Somerset. The new personal crown was made in "imperial" style from gold, precious stones, and pearls. The word "imperial" signifies the style of a crown, with raised arches. Everdyes used scrap gold from the Secret Jewel House including two girdles and a set of nine letters "I" or "J", perhaps originally made for Edward VI's mother Jane Seymour. The new crown was set with pearls from Henry VIII's collars and caps, and may have included the large balas ruby of the Black Prince, a stone sourced in Myanmar. Everdyes' crown was detailed in the inventory of Edward VI:

Item a Crowne of golde Imperiall made for the kinges majestie our Soveraigne Lorde Edwarde the vj^{th} the nether Border sett with ix pointed diamountes and ix Settes of peerles and v peerles in every sett being uppon the same border certeyne Borders of Antiques of golde sett with viij rocke Rubies and xx peerles with foure borders which make the Crown Imperiall sett with iiij Emeraldes iiij rubies and iiij diamountes with lxxj peerles and with a Lardge Ballace in the toppe percede, sett with a litell crosse of golde in the toppe of the Ballace enameled.

The crown was extant in 1649.
