= Lochwood Tower =

- Lochwood Castle
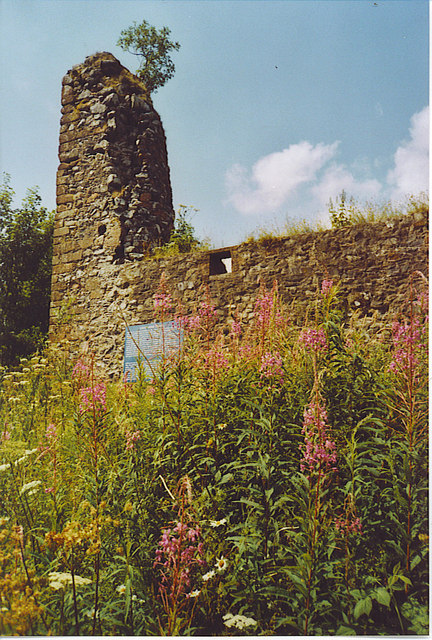
- The remains of Lochwood Tower in 2006

- Location within Scotland Location within the United Kingdom
- Interactive map of Lochwood Tower
- 55.25667°N 3.441921°W

History
- Built: 14th century

Lochwood Tower, also known as Lochwood Castle, is a ruined 16th-century L-plan tower house situated in Annandale (Valley of the River Annan) about 6 miles (9.7 km) south of the town of Moffat in the modern county of Dumfries and Galloway, Scotland. It was the seat of the Clan Johnstone.

== History ==
The Johnstones held the property from the 14th century, and it was their main stronghold. In 1643, the family were created Earls of Hartfell, and in 1660, Earls of Annandale. The second Earl of Annandale and Hartfell, was created Marquess of Annandale in 1701.

The English captured the tower in 1547, during the Rough Wooing, and held it until 1550. They described it as 'a fair large tower, able to lodge all our company safely, with a barmkin, hall, kitchen and stables, all within the barmkin...'.

Edward Seymour, 1st Duke of Somerset, the English commander, wrote,

We came there about half an hour before daybreak and the greater part of us lay close without the barmekin but about a dozen of the men got over the barmekin wall and stole close into the house within the barmekin (enclosure wall) and took the wenches there and kept them secure in the house till daylight. At sunrise, two men and a woman, being in the tower, one of the men rising in his shirt and going to the tower head and seeing nothing stir about he called to the wench that lay in the tower and bade her rise and open the tower door and call up them that lay beneath. She so doing and opening the iron door and a wood door without it, our men within the barmekin brake a little too soon to the door and the wench perceiving them, leaped back into the tower and had almost got the wood door shut but one of our men got hold it that she could not get it closed. So the skirmish arose and we scaled the barmekin and broke open the wood door and she being troubled with the wood door left the iron door open and so we entered and won the Loghwood; where we found truly the house well purveyed with salted beef, malt, barley, oatmeal, butter and cheese.

The Maxwells and Armstrongs burnt it in 1585. It was rebuilt, and James VI of Scotland and Ludovic Stewart, 2nd Duke of Lennox stayed on 11 October 1592. The castle was abandoned around 1724.

== Structure ==
Lochwood Tower, a Motte-and-bailey castle overlain by a later stone castle, lies on the east of a promontory about 600 metres (2,000 ft) long and 400 metres (1,300 ft) wide, which thrusts northwards into an area of largely-unreclaimed moss. The tower, which was once a strong castle, incorporates some 15th-century work. Not much remains above the level of the vaulted basement. There was a courtyard contained by a wall, which contained the kitchen and other buildings. The hall would have been on the first floor of the main block, with private chambers above. The entrance, which led to a wide turnpike stair, was in the wing. On the north was a hillock 'apparently in part artificial' named 'The Mount', a circular double-terraced motte with ramparts, apparently a Norman predecessor of the stone tower. To the south of the tower, in the centre of a level meadow which was probably the garden, was an artificially-looking, ditched earthen mound, some 9 feet (2.7 m) high and 36 feet (11 m) to 40 feet (12 m) across the base.

== See also ==
- Castles in Great Britain and Ireland
- List of castles in Scotland
