= Pringle =

Pringle is a Scottish and English surname.

Notable people with the surname include:

- Aileen Pringle (1895–1989), American actress
- Alan Pringle (born 1952), American football player
- Alexander Pringle (politician) (1791–1857), Scottish politician
- Alexandra Pringle (born 1952/1953), British publisher
- Andrew Pringle:
  - Andrew Pringle (British Army officer) (born 1946), British Army officer
  - Andrew Pringle, Lord Alemoor (died 1776), Scottish judge
  - Andrew Seth Pringle-Pattison (1856–1931), Scottish philosopher
  - Andy Pringle (born c. 1949), Canadian bond trader and political activist in Ontario
- Anne Pringle (born 1955), British diplomat
- Anne Pringle (scientist) (PhD 2021), American mycologist
- Benjamin Pringle (1807–1887), American politician
- Bryan Pringle (1935–2002), British actor
- Byron Pringle (born 1993), American football player
- Cedric E. Pringle (born c. 1964), American admiral
- Charlie Pringle (1894–1966), Scottish footballer
- Chris Pringle (born 1968), New Zealand cricketer
- Cyrus Pringle (1838–1911), American botanist
- Curt Pringle (born 1959), California politician
- David Pringle (born 1950), Scottish science fiction editor
- Denys Pringle (born 1951), British archaeologist and medievalist
- Derek Pringle (born 1958), English cricketer
- Donald Pringle (1932–1975), English cricketer
- Eric Pringle, (1935–2017), British television and radio writer
- Eunice Pringle (1912–1996), American actress
- Harold Pringle (d. 1945), executed Canadian soldier
- Harry Pringle (1900–65), English footballer
- Harry Pringle (producer) (1903 – after 1959), radio and television producer in England and Australia
- Heather Pringle (writer), Canadian author and journalist
- Henry F. Pringle (1897–1958), American historian; Pulitzer prize
- Jane Pringle, American politician
- Jamale Pringle, Antigua and Barbuda politician
- James Pringle:
  - James Pringle (Northern Ireland politician) (1874–1935), British politician
  - James E. Pringle (born 1949), British astrophysicist
  - James Hogarth Pringle (1863–1941), Australian surgeon
- Jen Pringle (born 1983) English children's TV presenter and actress
- Joan Pringle (born 1945), American actress
- Joel R. P. Pringle (1873–1932), American naval officer
- John Pringle:
  - John Pringle (1707–1782), Scottish physician
  - John Pringle (born 1938), Australian baritone
  - John Pringle, Lord Haining (c. 1674–1754), Scottish landowner, judge and politician, shire commissioner for Selkirk 1702–07, MP for Selkirkshire 1708–29, Lord of Session
  - John Pringle (MP, born 1716) (c. 1716–1792), son of the above, Scottish landowner and politician, MP for Selkirkshire 1765–86
  - John Pringle (1796–1831) of Haining, Scottish politician, MP for Lanark Burghs 1819–20
  - John James Pringle (1855–1922), British dermatologist
  - John Abbott Pringle, Ontario farmer, merchant and political figure
  - John Quinton Pringle (1864–1925), Scottish painter
  - John Wallace Pringle (1863–1938), Chief Inspecting Officer of the UK Railways Inspectorate
  - John William Sutton Pringle (1912–1982), British zoologist
  - Sir John Pringle, 2nd Baronet (1662–1721) of the Pringle Baronets
- Mark Pringle, member of Hot House
- Martin Pringle (born 1964), New Zealand cricketer
- Martin Pringle (born 1970), Swedish soccer player
- Mike Pringle:
  - Mike Pringle (politician) (born 1945), Scottish politician
  - Mike Pringle (gridiron football) (born 1967), Canadian football player
- Meyrick Pringle (born 1966), South African cricketer
- Percy Pringle (1954–2013), American wrestling manager
- Phil Pringle (born 1952), Australian pastor
- Ramona Pringle, Canadian actress
- Richard Pringle, American psychologist and professor
- Robert Pringle:
  - Robert Pringle (secretary at war) (d. 1736), British politician
  - Robert Abercrombie Pringle (1855–1922), Canadian lawyer and politician
  - Robert Pringle (poet) (born 1940), American poet
- Thomas Pringle:
  - Thomas Pringle (1789–1834), Scottish writer, poet and abolitionist
  - Thomas Pringle (politician) (born 1967), Irish politician
  - Thomas Pringle (Royal Navy officer) (d. 1803), British admiral
- Valerie Pringle (born 1953), Canadian journalist and television host
- Walter Pringle, Lord Newhall (1664?–1736), Scottish lawyer and judge
- Walter Pringle (rugby union) (1869–1945), New Zealand rugby player
- William Pringle:
  - William Henry Pringle (1772–1840), British soldier and politician
  - William Henderson Pringle (1877–1967), Scottish politician
- William Pringle (Liberal politician) (1874–1928), British politician

== See also ==
- Clan Pringle
