= John Pringle =

John Pringle may refer to:

== Politics ==
- John Pringle, Lord Haining (c. 1674–1754), Scottish landowner, judge and politician
- John Pringle (Selkirkshire MP, died 1792) (c. 1716–1792), Scottish landowner and politician, son of the above
- John Pringle (Lanark Burghs MP) (1796–1831), Scottish politician, MP for Lanark Burghs, 1819–1820
- John Abbott Pringle (1892–1962), Ontario farmer, merchant and political figure

== Science ==
- Sir John Pringle, 1st Baronet (1707–1782), Scottish physician, and president of the Royal Society, son of Sir John Pringle, 2nd Baronet
- John James Pringle (1855–1922), British dermatologist
- John Wallace Pringle (1863–1938), British Army officer and railway engineer in India
- John Pringle (geologist) (1877–1948), Scottish geologist
- Sir John Pringle (zoologist) (1912–1982), British zoologist
- John Robert Pringle, American biologist

== Other people ==
- Sir John Pringle, 2nd Baronet (1662–1721), of the Pringle baronets
- Sir John Pringle, 5th Baronet (1784–1869), of the Pringle baronets
- John Quinton Pringle (1864–1925), Scottish painter
- John Pringle (rugby union) (1881–1952), Irish international rugby union player
- John Gilbert (actor) (John Cecil Pringle, 1899–1936), American actor
- John Douglas Pringle (1912–1999), Scottish-Australian journalist
- John Pringle (Jamaican businessman) (1925–2006), Jamaican businessman and ambassador
- John Pringle (baritone) (born 1938), Australian baritone

== See also ==
- John Pringle Nichol (1804–1859), Scottish educator, astronomer and economist
- John Douglas Pringle Award or British Prize for Journalism
