= Public Interest Journalism Initiative =

Australian research institute

The Public Interest Journalism Initiative (PIJI) is an independent Australian research and public policy institute, established in Melbourne in 2018. It is a registered not-for-profit charitable organisation that is focused on research into sustainability in the news media sector. It was founded by a group of university academics, including members of the Public Interest Journalism Foundation, and news media industry figures. It was established with philanthropic funding from the Susan McKinnon Foundation, Australian Communities Foundation and Hecht Trust.

== Research ==
PIJI research focuses on three main areas: assessing media diversity; measuring public support and value of journalism; and evaluating mechanisms for financial support.

In April 2020 PIJI launched the Australian News Mapping Project, an ongoing research project to track changes to the production and availability of news media. The project has attracted significant media attention as a source of independent information about Australian journalism. In 2023, the Australian Government funded PIJI to continue this project.

Other research projects have proposed a public interest journalism rebate scheme and investigated philanthropic funding for news companies.

PIJI also contributed to the development of the News Media Bargaining Code.

== Governance ==
PIJI's Board of Directors is chaired by Professor Allan Fels. Its Board includes Eric Beecher, Richard Eccles, Leslie Falkiner-Rose, Virginia Haussegger, Anita Jacoby and Mette Schepers. Past members of the Board include Professor Glyn Davis, Adam Ferrier, Karen Mahlab, Dr Sophie Oh, Grant Rule, Dr Margaret Simons, and Professor Marilyn Warren.

Its research programme is overseen by a panel of academic experts including Professor Derek Wilding (Chair), Associate Professor Jason Bosland, Professor Axel Bruns, Associate Professor Andrea Carson, Associate Professor Andrew Dodd, Professor Kristy Hess, Professor Sora Park, Dr Margaret Simons and Professor Glenn Withers.

PIJI has a partnership agreement with the University of Melbourne. It has previously been partnered with the newDemocracy Foundation.
