= PIJ =

PIJ may refer to:

- Palestinian Islamic Jihad, a Palestinian Islamist organization formed in 1981
- Palestine–Israel Journal, a non-profit journal based in Jerusalem
- pij, the ISO 639-3 abbreviation for the Pijao language
- Proximal interphalangeal joints, one of two sets of joints in the Interphalangeal joints of the hand
- Public Interest Journalism Foundation, formerly at the Swinburne University of Technology, Australia
- Public Interest Journalistic Freedom, independent successor organisation to Public Interest Journalism Foundation, based in the UK
