= Margaret Simons =

Australian academic, journalist and author

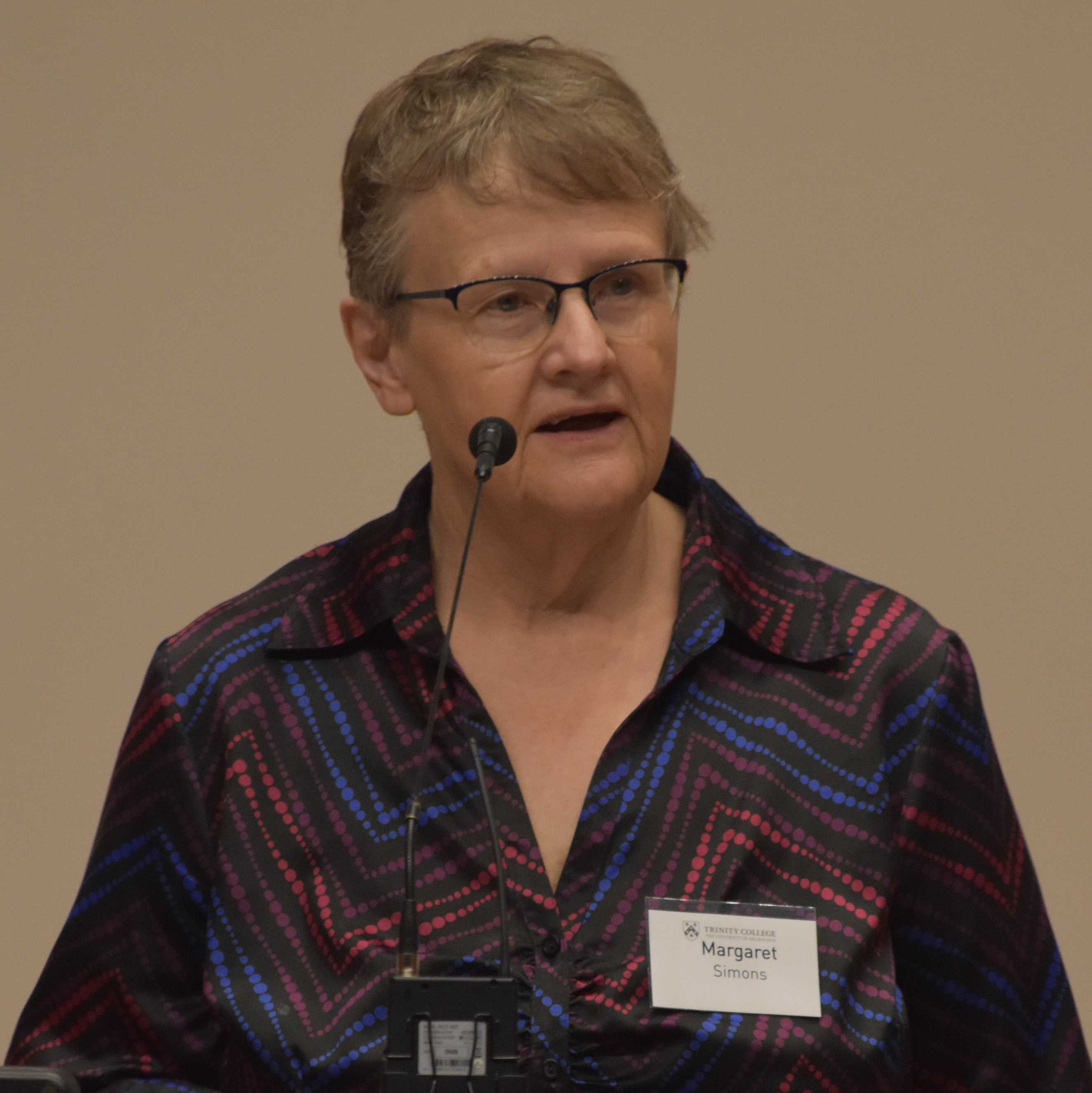
- Simons in 2025 at Trinity College
- Born: 1960 (age 64–65); United Kingdom
- Occupations: Journalist, academic, author

Margaret Simons (born 1960) is an Australian academic, freelance journalist and author. She has written numerous articles and essays as well as many books, including a biography of Senate leader of the Australian Labor Party, Penny Wong and Australian minister for the environment Tanya Plibersek. Her essay Fallen Angels won the Walkley Award for Social Equity Journalism.

She is as of 2021 an Honorary Fellow at the Centre for Advancing Journalism at the University of Melbourne.

== Early life and education ==
Simons was born in the UK in 1960.

Simons has a doctorate in creative arts from the University of Technology, Sydney.

== Career ==
In 2010, Simons co-founded, with Melissa Sweet, the community-funded news site YouComm News, run by the Public Interest Journalism Foundation based at Swinburne University of Technology. At this time, she was a research fellow at the Institute of Social Research at Swinburne, and also a Senior Associate of RMIT University.

She was the media reporter for Crikey and has been a regular media commentator in The Guardian. She has also written for The Age, The Sydney Morning Herald, Griffith Review, and The Monthly. For many years, she wrote the "Earthmother" gardening column for The Australian, and has also written gardening book and novels.

She was director of the Centre for Advancing Journalism and coordinator of the Master of Journalism degree at the University of Melbourne from 2012 to 2017, and served as Associate Professor of journalism at Monash University between 2017 and 2019.

From 2018 to 2021, Simons was a Director and Chair of Research at the Public Interest Journalism Initiative.

As of 2021, Simons is an Honorary Fellow at the Centre for Advancing Journalism at Melbourne University.

== Recognition ==
Simons was a finalist for a Walkley Award for journalism in 2007 for the story Buried in the Labyrinth, about the release of a paedophile into the community, published in Griffith Review. Her book The Content Makers – Understanding the Future of the Australian Media (2007) was longlisted for the 2008 Walkley Book Award for non-fiction.

In 2015 she won the Walkley Award for Social Equity Journalism for her essay Fallen Angels, published in The Monthly. The essay is an investigation of sex tourism in the Philippines and the children that have been abandoned there by their Australian fathers. The award was shared with photographer Dave Tacon.

Her biography of Penny Wong, Senate leader of the Australian Labor Party, was longlisted for the 2020 Walkley Book Award.

== Selected works ==
- The ruthless garden. Melbourne: Bookworld. 1993.
- The Truth Teller (1996)
- Wheelbarrows, Chooks & Children: a gardener's life (1999)
- Fit to Print: inside the Canberra Press Gallery (1999)
- The Meeting of the Waters: the Hindmarsh Island affair (2003)
- Latham's World: the new politics of the outsiders (2004)
- The Rich and Fertile Story of Compost: resurrection in a bucket (2004)
- The Content Makers: understanding the media in Australia (2007)
- Faith, Money & Power: what the religious revival means for politics (2007)
- Malcolm Fraser: the political memoirs (with Malcolm Fraser) (2010)
- "Sustaining a nation". Griffith Review. 27: 5–18. Autumn 2010.
- Duty of Care, August 2010, The Monthly
- Journalism at the Crossroads: crisis and opportunity for the press (2012)
- Kerry Stokes: self made man (2013)
- Six Square Metres: reflections from a small garden (2015)
- Fallen Angels, July 2015, The Monthly
- The Long Letter to a Short Love, or..., Summer 2015, Meanjin
- Right Wing Refugee, January 2016, SBS
- Lost Boy Found, June 2016, SBS
- Is Michelle Guthrie Tuned in to the ABC?, September 2016, The Monthly
- Penny Wong: passion and principle (2019)
- Cry Me a River: The Tragedy of the Murray-Darling Basin, March 2020, Quarterly Essay
- Tanya Plibersek: On Her Own Terms (2023)
