= Andrew Pringle =

Andrew Pringle or Andy Pringle may refer to:

- Andrew Pringle, Lord Alemore (died 1776), Scottish judge, Solicitor General for Scotland 1755–59, Lord of Session 1759–92
- Andrew Pringle (British Army officer) (Andrew Robert Douglas Pringle, born 1946), retired British Army officer, president of KBR's International Government and Defence business
- Andy Pringle (born c. 1949), retired Canadian bond trader and Conservative political activist in Ontario
- Andrew Pringle Jr. (1927–2021), US Air Force general
- Andrew Pringle (cricketer) (born 1978), South African cricketer

== See also ==
- Andrew Seth Pringle-Pattison (1856–1931), Scottish philosopher
- Pringle (surname)
