= Alan Lau =

Alan Lau may refer to:

- Alan Chong Lau (born 1948), American poet and artist
- Alan Kin-Tak Lau, Hong Kong engineer and academic
