= General Pringle =

General Pringle may refer to:

- Andrew Pringle (British Army officer) (born 1946), British Army major general
- Andrew Pringle Jr. (born 1927), U.S. Air Force major general
- Heather L. Pringle (fl. 1990s–2010s), U.S. Air Force major general
- Robert Pringle (British Army officer) (1855–1925), British Army major general
- Steuart Pringle (1928–2013), Royal Marines lieutenant general
- William Henry Pringle (1772–1840), British Army lieutenant general
