= Melissa Sweet =

Melissa Sweet may refer to:

- Melissa Sweet (writer), Australian journalist and non-fiction writer
- Melissa Sweet (illustrator) (born 1956), American illustrator and author of children's books
