= John Pringle (rugby union) =

Irish rugby union player

- Full name: John Edward Conrad Pringle
- Born: 8 November 1881 County Monaghan, Ireland
- Died: 8 May 1952 (aged 70) Buckland St Mary, England
- Height: 6 ft 1 in (185 cm)
- Weight: 13 st (182 lb; 83 kg)
- School: Campbell College
- Notable relative(s): Seton Pringle (brother); James Pringle (cousin)

Rugby union career
- Position: Forward
International career
Years	Team	Apps	(Points)
1902	Ireland	2	(0)

John Edward Conrad Pringle (8 November 1881 — 8 May 1952) was an Irish international rugby union player.

== Biography ==
Born in County Monaghan, Pringle was a brother of surgeon Seton Pringle and cousin of politician James Pringle. He was educated at Campbell College, where he captained the cricket and rugby sides, then moved to Surrey to attend the Cooper's Hill Engineering School. While playing rugby for Cooper's Hill, Pringle gained two Ireland caps playing as a forward during the 1902 Home Nations Championship.

Pringle received his commission to the Royal Engineers in 1903.

== See also ==
- List of Ireland national rugby union players
