= Karen Mahlab =

Australian businesswoman

Karen Mahlab AM, , is an Australian businesswoman, philanthropist, and social entrepreneur whose work has focused on developing infrastructure and communication channels within Australia's charity and media fields. She is known for founding Pro Bono Australia, a media organisation serving the Australian civil society sector. Mahlab has also co-founded social enterprises focused on connecting communities, non-profit organisations, volunteers, philanthropic groups, and businesses.

== Education and training ==
Mahlab attended Presbyterian Ladies College, graduated from Monash University with a Bachelor of Economics (BEc), and holds certifications in Yoga Teacher Training, Reiki, and Soul-Centred Psychotherapy.

== Career ==
Mahlab was the CEO and Founder of Pro Bono Australia, Australia's first online social sector publisher. Established in 2000, Pro Bono Australia operated as an online information hub serving Australia's community and non-profit sectors until 2023. The platform provided news coverage of sector developments, a job board for non-profit positions, information about charitable organizations and their services, details on corporate community initiatives, and links to volunteering opportunities.

Mahlab has also co-founded several social enterprise and philanthropic startups, including The Public Interest Journalism Initiative, which conducts research into how to make Australian public interest journalism sustainable; PS Media, a collaborative local media service that co-creates the news with the communities it serves; and the MacroMelbourne Initiative, a Melbourne Community Foundation project researching socioeconomic disadvantage.

As a volunteer, Mahlab has served in numerous leadership and governance positions across philanthropic, cultural, and social justice organizations. She has been Chair of the Australian Art Orchestra since 2016 and of Victoria University's Sir Zelman Cowen Centre since 2019. Her previous board memberships include the Reichstein Foundation (2015-2019), Ten20 Foundation (2014), Jewish Aid Australia (2008-2012), and the National Council of Jewish Women Foundation Victoria (2007-2015). Mahlab was a long-term board member (2002-2012) and later Ambassador (2012-present) for the Australian Communities Foundation, where she initiated and chaired the MacroMelbourne Initiative (2006-2011), which directed over $2 million to projects addressing urban disadvantage.

== Appointments and recognition ==
In 2012, Mahlab was named one of Australia's top 100 Women of Influence by the Australian Financial Review newspaper.

In 2015, she was awarded a Member of the Order of Australia for her contributions to the not-for-profit sector and philanthropic initiatives.

In 2016, Mahlab was one of 29 Victorian finalists in the Telstra Business Women's Awards in the category of Social Purpose Businesses.

In 2017, she was appointed Chair of the Advisory Committee of Swinburne University of Technology’s Social Innovation Research Institute, which partners with communities, industries, and not-for-profit organizations to create solutions to complex social problems.

In 2019, she was named Chair of Victoria University's Sir Zelman Cowen Centre, which provides specialized legal training and education while promoting social cohesion through community engagement programs.
