= University of Melbourne Faculty of Arts =

University teaching faculty in Australia

The clocktower of the Old Arts building

The Faculty of Arts is one of the largest faculties at The University of Melbourne. It is the university's home of teaching and research in the humanities, social sciences and languages. Teaching of the arts and humanities at The University of Melbourne began when the university was first opened to students in 1855, and the Faculty of Arts officially opened in 1903.

The current dean of the Faculty of Arts at The University of Melbourne is Professor Jennifer Balint.

== Research ==
The Faculty of Arts is home to many researchers who are working on publicly and privately funded research projects. These projects range from archaeology to contemporary art.

Research output contributes to the world rankings of The University of Melbourne, which in 2019 ranked 41 for Arts and Humanities and 52 for Social Sciences.

Notable academics who have conducted research at the Faculty of Arts include:

- Gareth Evans (politician) (International Relations)
- Margaret Simons (Journalism)
- Tim McNamara(Language Testing)
- Abdullah Saeed (Islamic Studies)
- Peter Singer (Philosophy, Ethics)

== Courses and programs ==
=== Undergraduate ===
The faculty is home to the university's Bachelor of Arts, which was the first degree offered at the university in 1855.

The university was the first in Australia to align its education more with that offered in Europe and North America and to offer a broad education at the undergraduate level with specialised options at the graduate level. Since the launch of this revised structure the degree has become the most popular in the state of Victoria based on how many high school students select it as their first preference. In 2013 over 1700 offers were made for this program, making it one of the largest in Australia.

In 2018 students could take the following majors or minors in the humanities, social sciences and languages.

- Ancient World Studies
- Anthropology
- Arabic Studies
- Art History
- Asian Studies
- Australian Indigenous Studies
- Chinese Studies
- Classics
- Creative Writing
- Criminology
- Development Studies
- Economics
- English and Theatre Studies
- English Language Studies
- European Studies
- French Studies
- Gender Studies
- Geography
- German Studies
- Hebrew and Jewish Studies
- History
- History and Philosophy of Science
- Indonesian Studies
- Islamic Studies
- Italian Studies
- Japanese Studies
- Knowledge and Learning
- Law and Justice
- Linguistics and Applied Linguistic
- Media and Communications
- Philosophy
- Politics and International Studies
- Psychology
- Russian Studies
- Screen and Cultural Studies
- Social Theory
- Sociology
- Spanish and Latin American Studies

== Structure ==
The faculty comprises five discipline schools and a graduate school, which support a range of institutes and research centres.

=== Deans ===
- Thomas George Tucker 1903-xx
- Max Crawford 1941–1942 and 1945–1947
- Alan Rowland Chisholm 1943-1945
- Ian Ramsay Maxwell, 1948-1950
- Joseph Burke 1950-1954
- Harold Hunt 1955-1958
- Oscar Oeser 1958-1959
- Eric R. Love 1960-1962
- Harry Simon 1966-1977
- Edwin A. Huck 1978-xx
- Geoffrey Blainey 1982-1987
- Marion Adams 1987-1993
- Homer Le Grand 1995-1999
- Stuart Macintyre 1999-xx, xx-2006
- Belinda Probert, 2006-2007
- Mark Considine 2007-2018
- Russell Goulbourne 2019-2024
- Jennifer Balint 2024-

=== Discipline schools ===
The faculty has five discipline schools. These schools are home to researchers and teachers of various disciplines who contribute to the teaching and learning of the university.

- Asia Institute
- School of Culture & Communication
- School of Historical and Philosophical Studies
- School of Languages and Linguistics
- School of Social and Political Sciences.

=== Graduate School of Humanities and Social Sciences ===
The Faculty of Arts and Graduate School of Humanities and Social Sciences (GSHSS) cooperates with industry organisations such as the Australia Council for the Arts, Department of Foreign Affairs and Trade, Humanitarian Advisory Group, Melbourne International Film Festival, Melbourne Writers Festival and the National Gallery of Victoria.

=== Centre for Advancing Journalism ===
The Centre was founded in 2009 as the Centre for Advanced Journalism. Michael Gawenda was appointed as inaugural director.

In 2011, academic and author Margaret Simons took over as director and gave the Centre its current name. She remained in this role until July 2017. The current director is Andrew Dodd.

The Centre coordinates the teaching of the Master of Journalism, a coursework degree with focus on professional practice, law and ethics, media entrepreneurship and placement for internships. A graduate diploma and certificate in journalism are also offered.
