= Robert Pringle =

Robert Pringle may refer to:

- Robert Pringle (MP) (1798–1842), British Army officer and politician, member of parliament for Selkirkshire
- Robert Pringle (footballer) (1897–19??), English footballer
- Sir Robert Pringle, 1st Baronet (died c. 1700) of the Pringle baronets
- Robert Pringle (secretary at war) (died 1736), Scottish lawyer and politician, secretary at war in 1718
- Robert Abercrombie Pringle (1855–1922), Canadian lawyer and politician
- Robert Pringle (British Army officer) (1855–1925), British Army veterinary officer
- Robert Pringle (poet) (1943–2012), American poet and teacher
- Robert William Pringle (1920–1996) Scottish physicist
- Robert M. Pringle (born 1979), American biologist and conservationist
- Robert Maxwell Pringle (born 1936), American ambassador to Mali
- Robert Keith Pringle, Scottish civil servant
- Robert C. Pringle (tug), American tugboat
- Robert Pringle, Lord Edgefield (c.1700–1764), Scottish judge
- Bob Pringle (politician) (born 1946), Canadian politician
- Bob Pringle (golfer) (1851–1902), Scottish golfer
- Bob Pringle (trade unionist) (1942–1996), Australian trade unionist
