= St John Ambulance Ireland =

First aid organisation based in Republic of Ireland

- Logo of St John Ambulance Ireland
- Abbreviation: SJAI
- Founded: 1881 (training association); 1903 (uniformed brigade); 1945 (merger of association and brigade)
- Type: Non-governmental, charitable voluntary organisation
- Registration no.: 20002893
- Purpose: First aid, health promotion, positive youth development
- Location: Lumsden House, 29 Leeson Street Upper, Dublin 4, D04 PX94, Ireland
- Coordinates: 53°19′46″N 6°15′02″W
- Origins: St John Ambulance
- Region served: Ireland
- Services: Community service, emergency medical services, youth programmes
- Method: First aid training, event first aid and ambulance cover, reserve support to statutory services, youth service
- Key people: Commissioner: John Hughes KStJ.
- Website: www.stjohn.ie
- Formerly called: St. John Ambulance Association Irish Centre; St. John Ambulance Brigade No. 12 District

St John Ambulance Ireland (SJAI), previously known as the St John Ambulance Brigade of Ireland, is a charitable voluntary organisation in Ireland. For constitutional reasons it is not a full member association of the Venerable Order of Saint John and the international St. John Ambulance movement, but rather is classed as an "associated body". The organisation is dedicated to the teaching and practice of medical first aid. It is engaged in first aid training to the public, providing first aid and ambulance cover at public events, patient transport and community services.

== History ==
The badge of the St John Ambulance Brigade, used from 1945 until the organisation's rebranding in 2012 (and still used for ceremonial purposes). It resembled the badge formerly used by St John Ambulance in England, but without that badge's heraldic beasts.

The St John Ambulance Association was established in the United Kingdom in 1877 as a foundation of the Order of St John, tasked with training the police, workers and members of the public in first aid. A centre for this purpose was established in Dublin around 1881, with a further centre being opened in Belfast in 1886. The following year saw the establishment of the St John Ambulance Brigade (a spin-off of the Association), comprising a body of uniformed volunteers ready to render first aid to the sick and injured. The first division of the Brigade to be established in Ireland was the Belfast Fire Brigade Ambulance Division, formed in 1892 by Mr C.E. Allan. From that year until 1914, divisions in Ireland were administered as part of the Brigade's No. 4 District (North West England).

The first division founded in what was to later become the Irish Free State was the Dublin (St James's Gate) Ambulance Division, formed in 1903 at the Guinness Brewery at St. James's Gate in Dublin, under the guidance of Dr (later Sir) John Lumsden. In his post as Medical Officer for Guinness, Lumsden was asked to provide first-aid classes for employees at the brewery; these classes became so popular that it was felt appropriate to establish a dedicated unit of the Brigade at the brewery. In 1905 the idea of the first public division came about following the Burgh Quay Disaster. This division was called the City of Dublin Ambulance Division, the first unit open to members of the public for membership. In 1909, women were allowed to join the ranks with the formation of the first nursing division, City of Dublin Nursing Division. Miss Eileen Blandford joined the Brigade in 1913 and in 1914 became District Secretary, working closely with Dr John Lumsden. In 1918, after war service in France, she was awarded the rank of Serving Sister of the Order of St John. She had a crucial role at the headquarters in Merrion Square and oversaw some major changes as part of her role while also working to establish the Brigade Welfare Department. She later married Seton Pringle, district surgeon of the Brigade.

The Brigade was involved with many major events in Irish history, including treating casualties from the clashes during the 1913 Dublin Lockout. In 1914 the divisions in Ireland were separated from No. 4 District to form their own region within the Brigade, No. 12 Ireland District, of which Lumsden was made Commissioner. Many members served together with Red Cross volunteers in the First World War as part of Voluntary Aid Detachments providing auxiliary medical aid for those injured in combat.

However, the Brigade became prominent in Dublin during the Easter Rising of 1916 where it treated casualties on both sides and fed and cared for evacuees. Working with Dr. Lumsden during the Easter Rising was Dr. Ella Webb who had joined the Brigade in 1914. She helped to set up an emergency hospital at the Brigade's headquarters at 14 Merrion Square during the Rising and "cycled daily through the firing line to visit the hospital" For these acts, and his role in establishing the St John Ambulance Brigade in Ireland, Lumsden was knighted as KBE by George V. At the same time Dr Ella Webb was appointed an MBE for her work.

Lumsden also encouraged Brigade members to be blood donors and advertised in the Irish national papers for people to register to set up an 'on-call' blood donor panel to serve hospitals in the Dublin area. The service later became the National Blood Transfusion Association in 1948 but owes its origin to the Brigade and more especially to Sir John Lumsden.

In 1922 the Irish Civil War caused the Brigade to go into the front line to help both sides. The following year, the first Cadet division (for those aged between 10 and 17) was formed.

In 1923, after the establishment of the Irish Free State, Lumsden wrote to the President of the Council of the Irish Free State to start the process of breaking the Brigade away from the control of the Brigade in London, and from the British Red Cross Society. Moves after 1923 further led to the formation of the Irish Red Cross Society in 1939. Lumsden was one of the first members of the Irish Red Cross. Following the partition of Ireland, the divisions in Northern Ireland were reorganised in 1924 to form a separate administrative region, the Northern Ireland (Ulster) District, under Drs D.E. McCorkell and A.C.H. Todd.

In 1945, arrangements were made to become completely independent of the Brigade in the United Kingdom; the Association and Brigade within the southern Irish state were merged to form a new body, the St John Ambulance Brigade of Ireland, registered with the Order of St John as an "associated body".

The organisation has been the subject of complaints of child sexual abuse dating to the 1990s. In 2019, an investigation by the Child and Family Agency (Tusla) concluded that allegations of abuse made against a former senior member were founded. The judgement was upheld by an independent appeals panel in 2020, following an appeal lodged by lawyers for the abuser. The board of St. John Ambulance commissioned Judge Geoffrey Shannon to undertake a full internal review and his subsequent report led to significant changes in the organisation to ensure best practice in child protection.

== Organisation ==
As with most national St John Ambulance organisations, St John Ambulance Ireland is organised in a paramilitary fashion. Its activities are ultimately overseen by a board of directors. The organisation's executive staff is led by a Commissioner appointed by the council. In 2014 the Council appointed Mr John Hughes as the new Commissioner. Commissioner John Hughes was Acting Commissioner after the resignation of Commissioner Prof. Patrick K. Plunkett KStJ in December 2013, who assumed the role in 2008. The executive includes a Deputy Commissioner, a number of Assistant Commissioners, and the Chief Staff Officer who are responsible for different areas of the organisation's activities.

Operationally and geographically, the organisation is organised into a number of local units known as "divisions", each headed by a Divisional Superintendent and typically consisting of 10–30 members. Superintendents are assisted by Divisional Officers, Sergeants, Corporals and Lance Corporals, who form middle management. A division may also have an attached medical practitioner or registered nurse, known as a Divisional Surgeon and Divisional Nursing Officer respectively.

Divisions are located in cities and towns across Ireland, including a number of divisions in Dublin city and county, with further divisions in Drogheda, Mayo, Cavan, Kildare, Cork City, Glanmire, and Limerick City.

== Ranks of SJAI ==
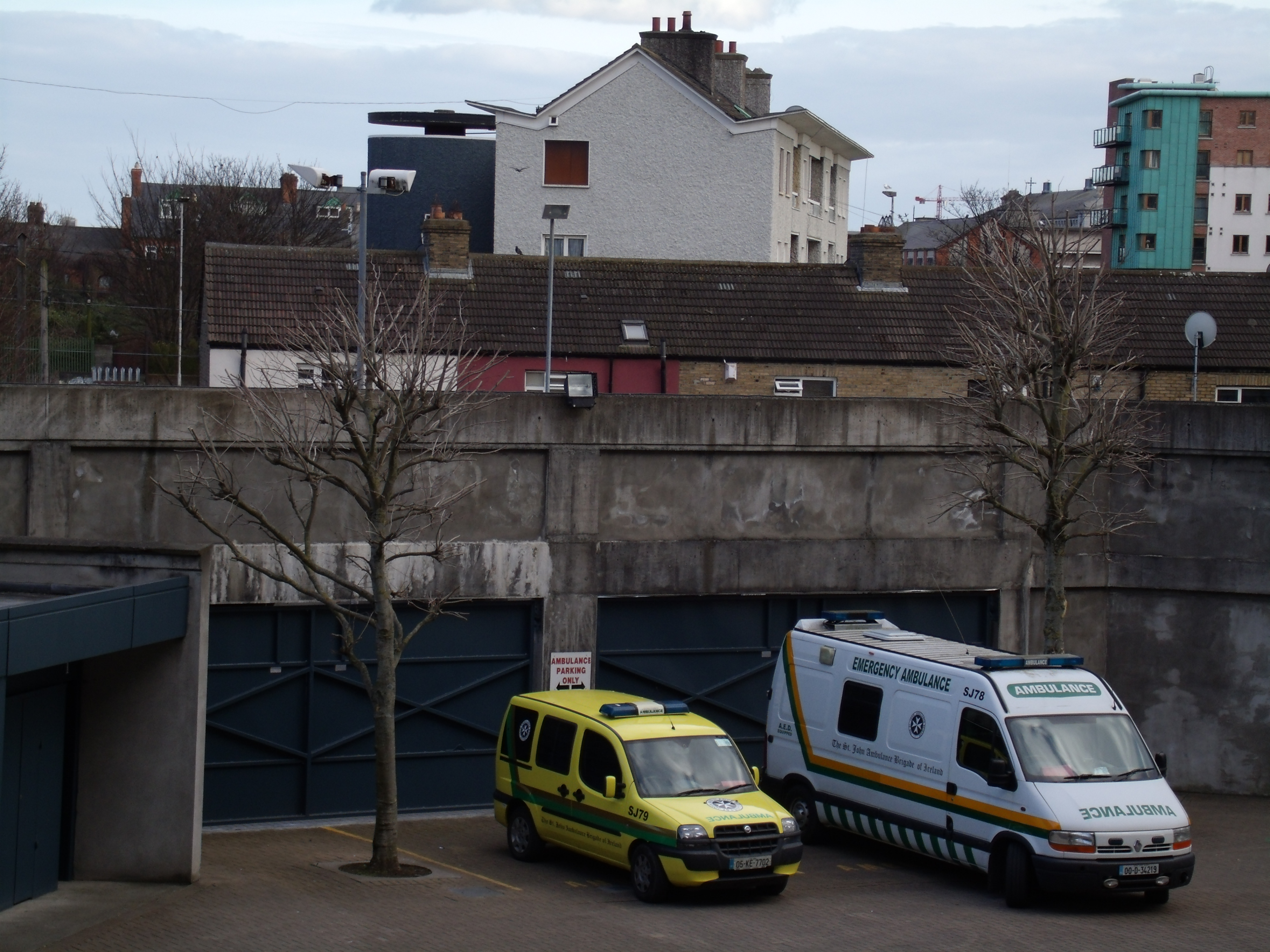
Two vehicles of St John Ambulance Ireland outside a game at Croke Park

Since 2024, St John Ambulance Ireland has dispensed with the hierarchical rank system within the organisation. Members will be appointed, for a defined term of office, to roles based on their skills and experience, rather than the time served. The former ranks within St John Ambulance Ireland were defined as:

Adult ranks

Positions	Insignia
Commissioner	(Cross of St John over three pips)
Assistant Commissioner	(Cross of St John over two pips)
Staff Officer	(Cross of St John over one pip)
District Officer	(Cross of St John)
Divisional Surgeon; Divisional Superintendent	
Nursing Officer; 1st Divisional Officer	
2nd Divisional Officer	
Sergeant	
Corporal	
Lance Corporal	(one downward chevron)
Member	

Cadet Adult Ranks (i.e., adults in charge of cadet divisions)

Positions	Insignia
Cadet Superintendent	(two pips over 2 straight white bars)
Cadet Officer	(one pip over 2 straight white bars)
Cadet Leader	(2 straight white bars)

Cadet ranks (ages 11–17)

Positions	Insignia
Cadet Sergeant	
Cadet Corporal	
Cadet Lance Corporal	(one downward chevron)
Cadet	

Rank insignia are worn on rank slides placed on the epaulettes. These are black for ordinary members & cadets, red for doctors, grey for nurses, and green for PHECC registered practitioners. All rank slides have either "St John Ambulance" or "St John Cadet" underneath the rank markings, as appropriate.

== Vehicles and Equipment ==
St John Ambulance deploy CEN 1789 compliant ambulances, rapid response vehicles, and cycle response units (both pedal cycles and eBike units). Ambulance types used include:

- Category C1 licence van/box conversions with external lifting ramp (often ex-HSE National Ambulance Service vehicles rebranded with St John Ambulance corporate image)
- Category B licence van conversions with internal lifting ramp
- 4x4 rapid response vehicles including Nissan Pathfinder and Toyota Landcruiser

In June 2025, Ireland's first eBike cycle response unit was launched in Cork City. This two-bike unit allows for response in urban areas when vehicular access is challenging, ensuring responders can attend incidents more quickly. The eBike cycle response unit is equipped with basic life support equipment including automated external defibrillator, portable oxygen, basic and advanced airways, in addition to basic first aid.

== Commissioners of the Brigade ==
There have been eight Commissioners since 1903:

- Sir John Lumsden, 1903 – 1944
- Anthony J. O'Conor, 1944 – 1951
- William G. Smith (Acting Commissioner), 1951 – 1955
- Douglas Montgomery, 1955 – 1974
- Derek L. Robinson, 1974 – June 2008
- Hugh J. Galvin (Acting Commissioner), June 2008 – July 2008
- Patrick K. Plunkett, July 2008 – 2013 (Resigned)
- John Hughes, 2014 –

== Uniform ==
A completely new uniform for the Brigade was launched on St John's Day 2012. For members & NCOs, it consists of black boots, black cargo trousers, belt with St John cross on the buckle, white shirt (open neck for operations and pilot shirt for dress wear), black tie (for dress wear only), black soft shell jacket and a hat (baseball cap or beanie hat for operations and peaked cap with white band for dress wear). Cadets do not have the open neck shirt beanie hat or peaked cap so wear the shirt, tie & baseball cap for operations & dress wear.

The dress uniform for officers is a black tunic & trousers with black shoes, shirt, tie & peaked hat with a black band. As with St John Ambulance in England since the 19th century, this style has been essentially copied from successive versions of a (London) Metropolitan Police No.1 (ceremonial/formal) uniform.

High visibility jerkins & jackets in fluorescent yellow with green yokes are worn by all ranks when required on operations.

A special uniform is authorised for members attached to Cycle Response Units that includes customised cycling jacket & trousers or shorts, polo shirt, helmet, gloves and equipment vest.

Rank slides are worn on the shoulders of all shirts, jackets and high visibility wear – whichever is the outer layer. Metal rank insignia is worn on the tunic.

== Gallery ==
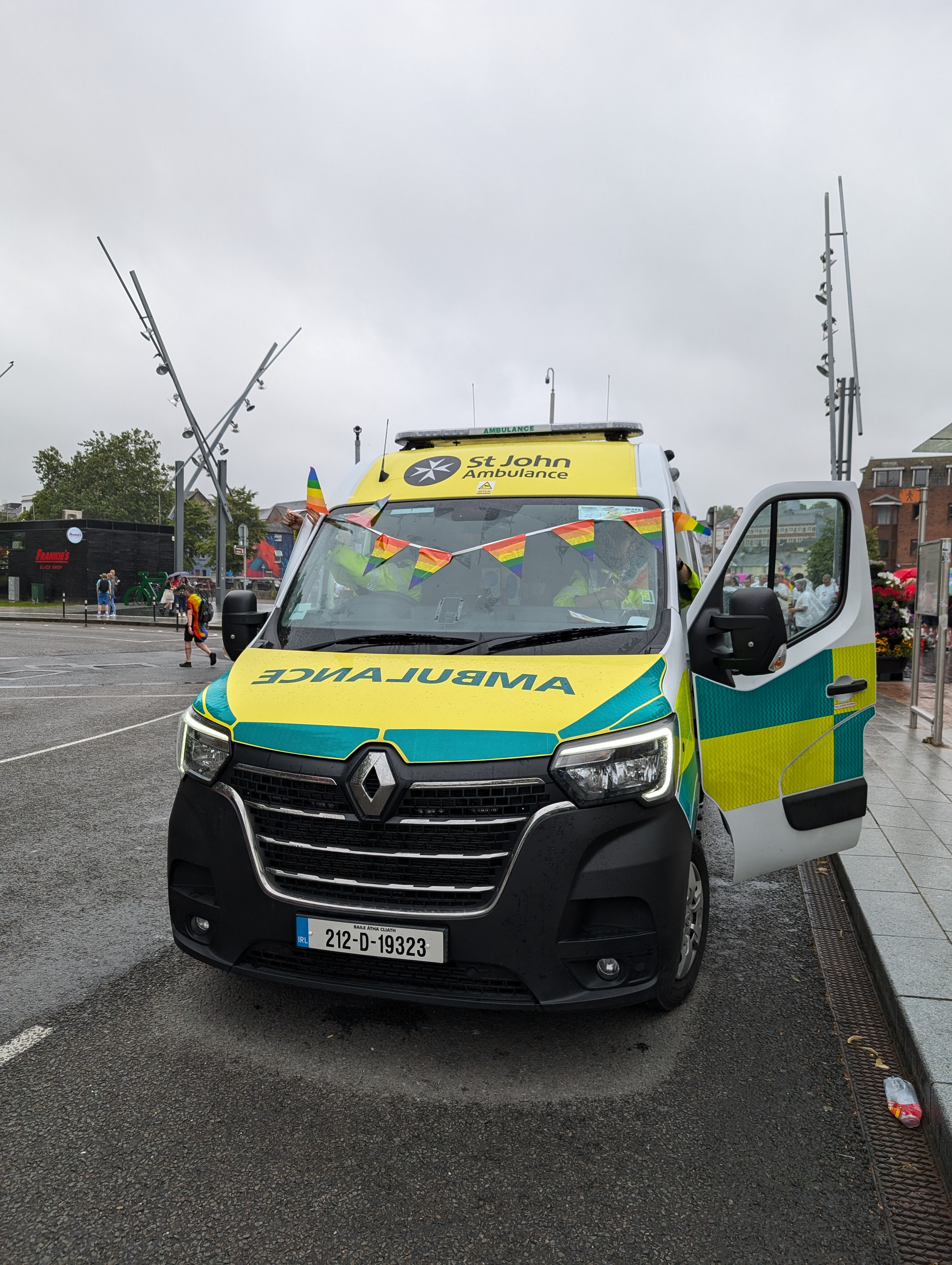
SJ52, Limerick City Ambulance, on duty at Cork Pride in 2024.

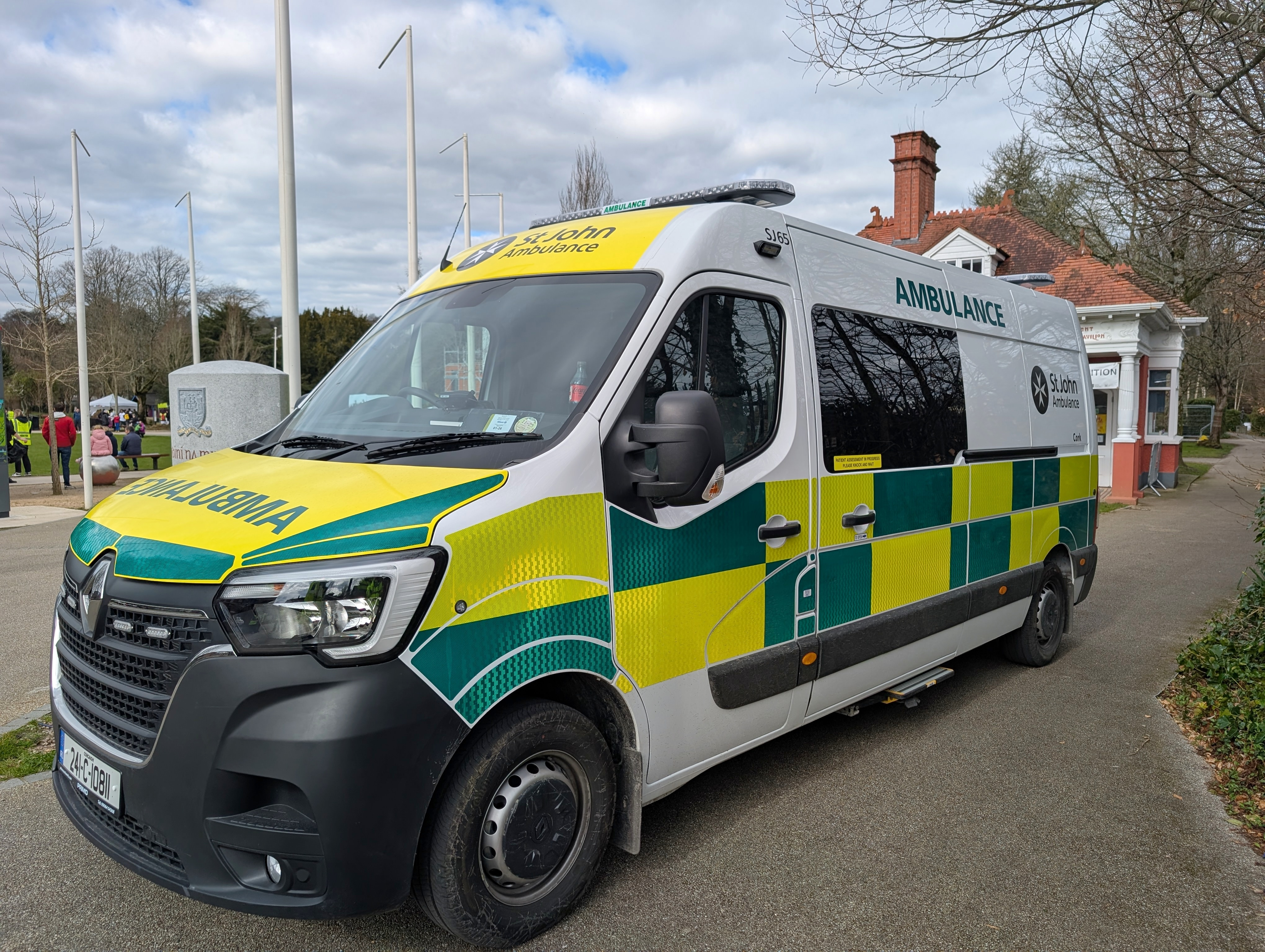
SJ65, a Renault Master ambulance, on duty at Fitzgerald's Park in Cork.

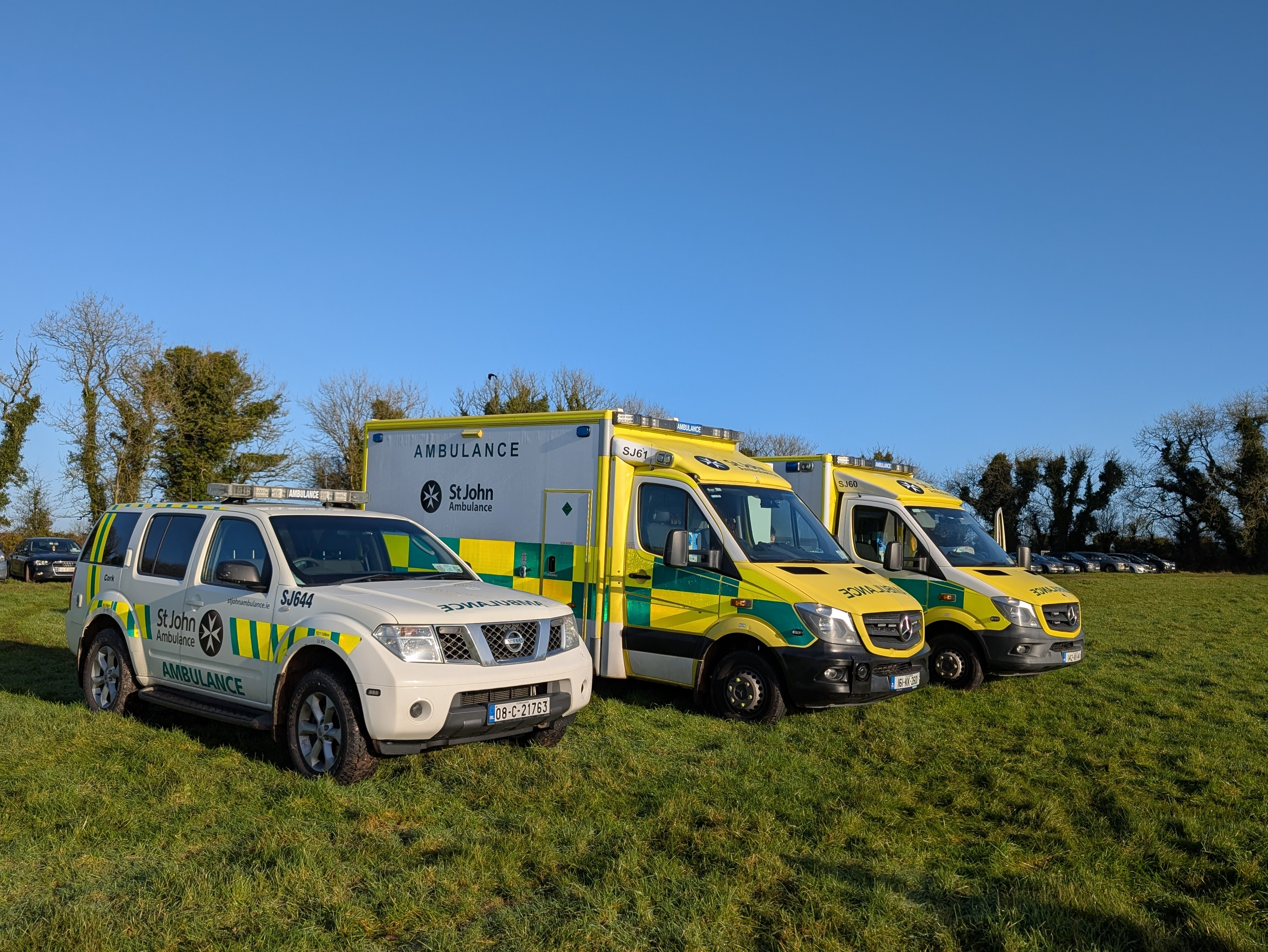
4x4 Nissan Pathfinder ambulance and two Mercedes-Benz Sprinter ambulances.

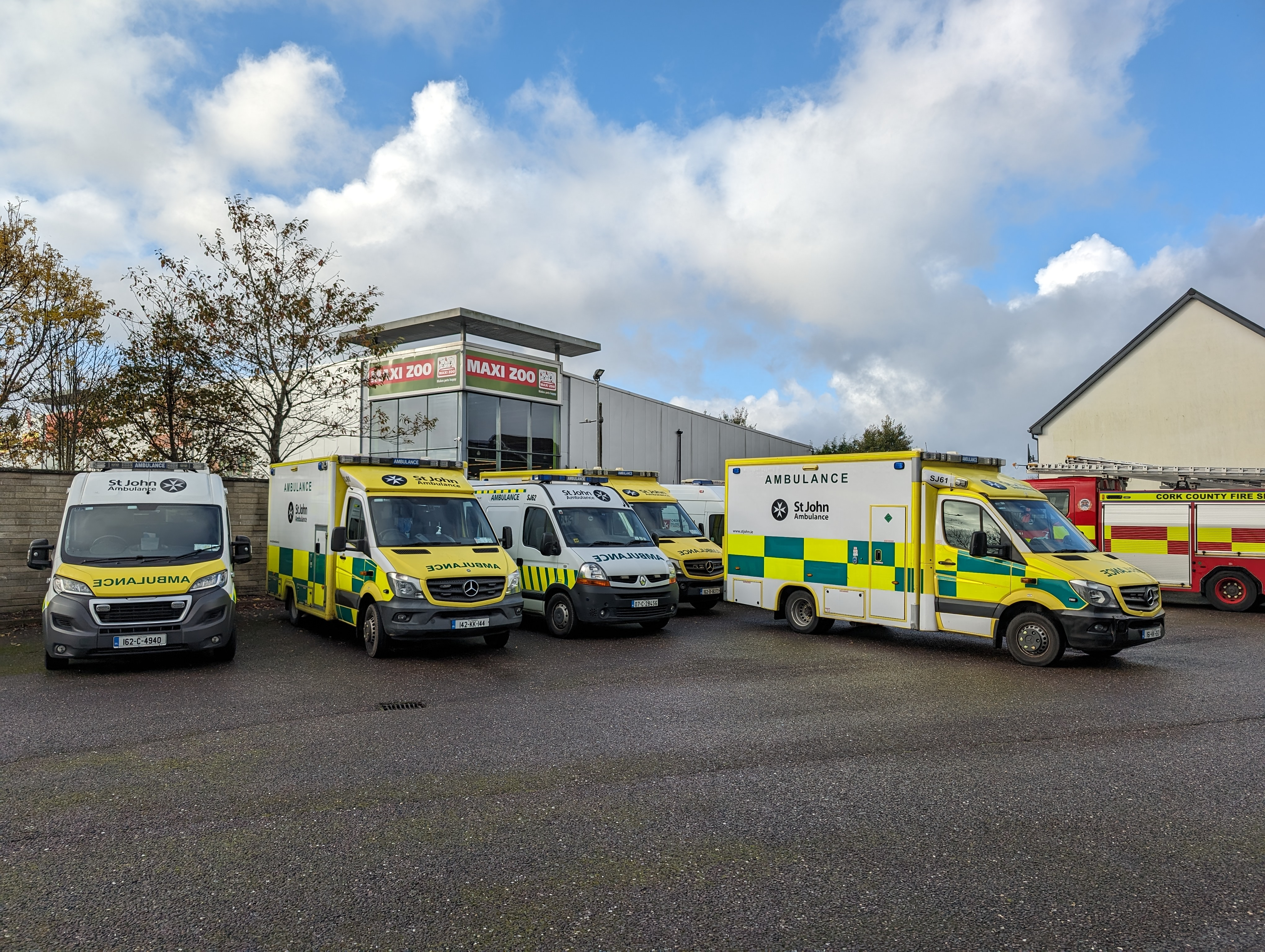
Fleet of St John vehicles at Midleton Fire Station assisting in the evacuation of Midleton Hospital during Storm Babet in October 2023.

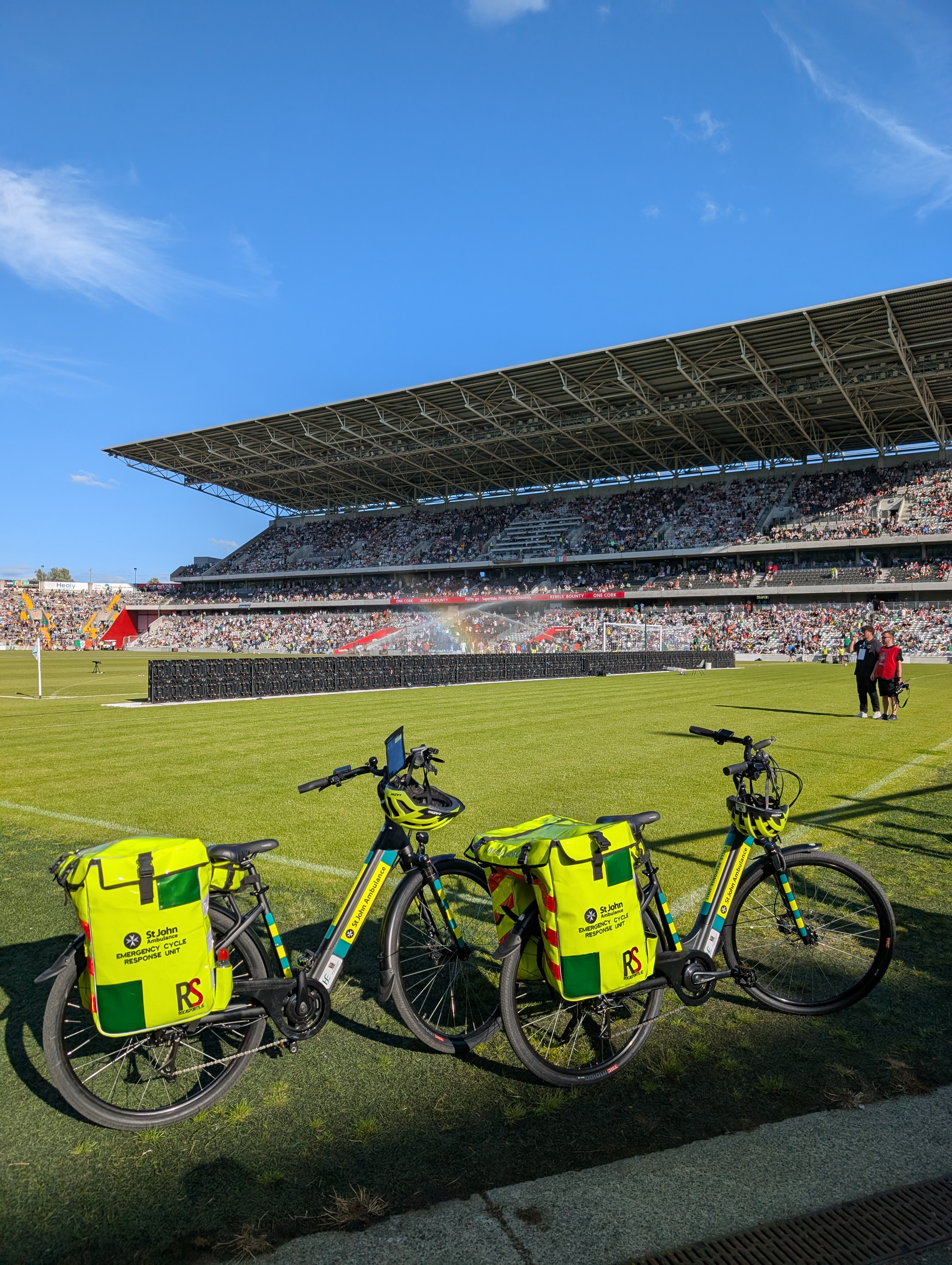
eBike Cycle Response Unit at Pairc ui Chaoimh stadium in Cork City in July 2025.

== See also ==
- Order of Malta Ambulance Corps
- Civil Defence Ireland
- Sovereign Military Order of Malta
- Service Medal of the Order of St John
- Insignia of the Venerable Order of St John
