= John Lumsden =

Irish physician, founder of the St John Ambulance Brigade Ireland

Sir John Lumsden

Sir John Lumsden KBE (14 November 1869 – 3 September 1944) was an Irish physician. He was famous for his role as Chief Medical Officer of Guinness Brewery, during which time he founded both St James's Gate F.C. and the St John Ambulance Brigade of Ireland. During the Easter Rising of 1916, he was noted for treating anyone who was wounded, regardless of which side they fought for.

== Early years ==
Sir John Lumsden was born in Drogheda, County Louth, Ireland, the son of John Lumsden, a bank manager, and Florence Isabella Groom Lumsden (née McKean). The father had come from Scotland via India to work in a bank in Armagh and later moved to Dublin in 1867 to work for the Provincial Bank. Lumsden's father was a keen golfer and Lumsden worked with his father and his brother in setting up a rough and ready golf course in 1885 west of the Phoenix Cricket Club, thus establishing Ireland's second oldest golf club, the Dublin Golf Club, which became the Royal Dublin Golf Club in 1891.

In 1896, Lumsden married Caroline Frances Kingscote, daughter of Major Fitzhardinge Kingscote and Agnes Grant Stuart, and their first child, John Fitzhardinge Lumsden, was born on 11 June 1897. At the time of the birth, they were living at Lumsden's parents house but, soon after, moved out to 4 Fitzwilliam Place, Dublin, where Lumsden also had a medical practice on the first floor.

Their first child was soon followed by sisters: Leslie, born in 1898, Norah in 1900, Margery in 1908 and twins, Nancy and Betty born in 1911.

== Lifetime achievements ==
Lumsden was a physician on the staff of Mercer's Hospital in Dublin and in 1902 was the Principal Medical Officer for the Commissioners of Irish Lights. However, it was his role as the Medical Officer (later Chief Medical Officer) at the Guinness Brewery that made Lumsden famous.

The Guinness family had a tradition of noblesse oblige and philanthropy and therefore Lumsden's work for Guinness focused on the well-being of the employees, many of whom lived in appalling conditions in the slums and tenements of inner city Dublin.

After the Great Irish Famine (1845–1846) many people moved from rural areas of Ireland into cities such as Dublin looking for food and work. This resulted in overcrowding with 33.9 percent of all families in Dublin each living in a single room. Poverty and cramped conditions led to problems of disease and by 1881 Dublin had the highest death rate in Europe.

Lumsden saw a high rate of tuberculosis amongst Guinness employees and knew that overcrowding was probably a factor. In 1900 he got the approval of the Guinness board to spend two months inspecting the homes of each Guinness employee to ensure that they lived in proper housing and to look for ways to prevent or treat the disease. The main Iveagh Trust buildings built in 1903–1905 were designed accordingly. He also studied the diets of the employees and established cookery classes for the wives of Guinness employees. Finally, he helped to set up the first Guinness sports club which included St James's Gate F.C.

In his post as Medical Officer, Lumsden was asked to provide first-aid classes for employees at the Guinness Brewery. The classes became so popular that they later became the first registered division of the St. John Ambulance Brigade of Ireland, which Lumsden founded in 1903 and became the first Commissioner, a post he held until his death.

The brigade was involved with many major events in Irish history, including treating casualties from the clashes during the General Strike of 1913 (sometimes referred to as the Dublin Lockout). However, the brigade became prominent in Dublin during the Easter Rising of 1916 where it treated casualties on both sides and fed and cared for evacuees. During the fighting in the streets of Dublin, Lumsden became a familiar figure as he dashed out carrying a white flag and his medical kit to tend to the wounded on both sides. He was knighted by King George V for these acts and for the formation of the St. John Ambulance Society and became Sir John Lumsden KBE.

Lumsden also encouraged brigade members to be blood donors and advertised in the Irish national papers for people to register to set up an 'on call' blood donor panel to serve hospitals in the Dublin area. The service later became the National Blood Transfusion Association in 1948 but owes its origin to the brigade and more especially to Lumsden.

In 1923, after the establishment of the Irish Free State, Sir John wrote to the president of the council of the Irish Free State to start the process of breaking the brigade away from the control of the British Red Cross Society and the Order of the St John of Jerusalem. This led to the brigade becoming an Associated Body and completely independent from the English-based St. John Ambulance and further led to the formation of the Irish Red Cross Society in 1939.

== Later years ==
In 1930, Lumsden moved into Earlscliffe in the Baily area of Howth, County Dublin where he practised his other passion: gardening. When Lumsden moved into Earlscliffe the gardens, according to his daughter, Betty L'Estrange, were "virtually shrubless and flowerless" He set about transforming the garden, planting shrubs and building a number of terraces. He also celebrated his work at the St John Ambulance Brigade by building a Maltese cross sundial at Earlscliffe, which gave him "enormous pleasure".

This sundial can still be seen today at Earlscliffe, which later came into the hands of the gardener and horticulturalist David Robinson.

Sir John Lumsden died on 3 September 1944.

== Arms ==
Coat of arms of John Lumsden
Notes Granted 22 April 1926 by Sir Nevile Rodwell Wilkinson, Ulster King of Arms. Crest On a wreath of the colours a naked arm embowed Proper grasping a sword Argent hilt and pommel Or. Escutcheon Azure a buckle Or between two wolves' heads in chief and in base a salmon naiant Argent. Motto Dei Dono Sum Quod Sum

== See also ==
- St. John Ambulance Brigade of Ireland
