= Alan Kin-Tak Lau =

Hong Kong engineer & academic

Alan Lau
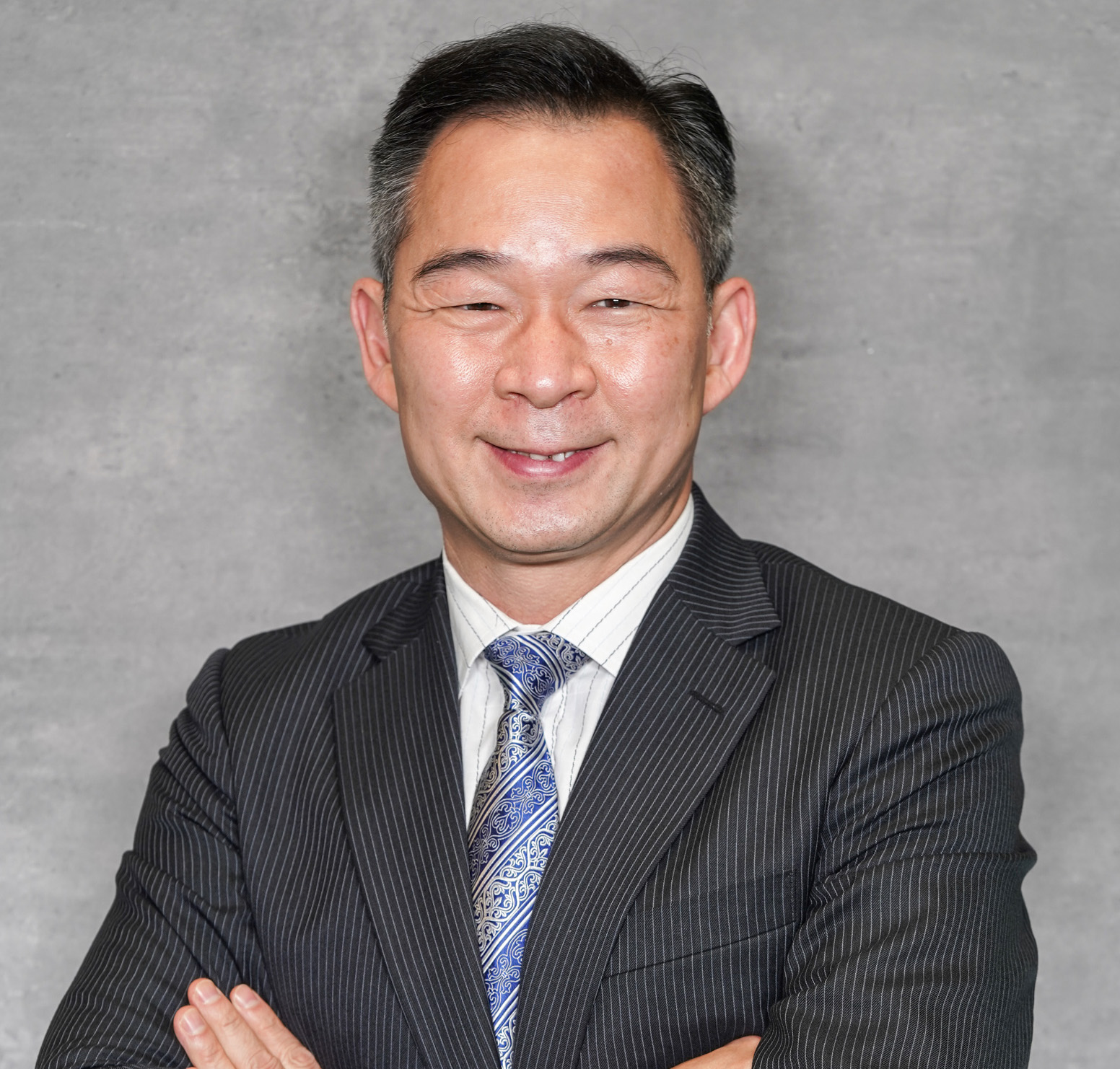
- Title: President and Chair Professor at Technological and Higher Education Institute of Hong Kong (THEi)
- Board member of: The Institution of Mechanical Engineers; The Future Fibre Hub; King’s Flair International (Holdings) Limited; Oceania Cybersecurity Centre Limited (Australia); Stawell Underground Physics Laboratory Limited (Australia)

Academic background
- Education: Royal Melbourne Institute of Technology; The Hong Kong Polytechnic University

Academic work
- Discipline: Engineering, Product Design
- Sub-discipline: Mechanical Engineering, Civil Engineering, Aerospace Engineering and Materials Engineering
- Institutions: Technological and Higher Education Institute of Hong Kong (THEi)

Alan Kin-tak Lau (Chinese: 劉建德) is a Hong Kong engineer and academic. He is the president and chair professor of product innovation at Technological and Higher Education Institute (THEi) of Hong Kong (香港高等教育科技學院校長）. Prior to this appointment, he was pro vice-chancellor (research partnership and digital innovation) at Swinburne University of Technology (澳洲斯威本科技大學副校長). He is also the Independent non-executive director of King’s Flair International (Holdings) Limited, the international vice president and trustee board member of The Institution of Mechanical Engineers (2014-2019) and an academic advisor at Asia University. He was also appointed the chair of professional accreditation panel for APEC/IPEA for Korea. From 2014 to 2016, he was the Alex Wong/Gigi Wong Endowed Professor in Product Engineering Design at the Hong Kong Polytechnic University (HKPolyU). Currently, he is a Fellow of European Academy of Sciences and Arts, the European Academy of Sciences. Lau has conducted research in the field of mechanical engineering, aerospace engineering and materials engineering. His work has been focused on aerospace composites, unmanned aerial vehicle, product design and engineering and bio-composites. Lau is recognized as Australian National Research Leader in Composite Materials 2019, published by The Australian Post. Within the period 2020-2022, he was director of Oceania Cybersecurity Centre Limited and Stawell Underground Physics Laboratory Company. He has been named as “2023 年度傑出人物” and “2024 年度全球傑出華人領袖”. Currently, he has been appointed as 中氫聚力首席技術官, 莞港創科合作顧問委員會成員 and 力嘉（上海）新能源有限公司首席顧問. Dr. Lau also established two academician workstations (院士工作站) with Basalt Fibre Composites Development Company Limited and Hebei University of Technology supported by Sichuan’s and Tianjin’s provincial Governments, respectively to support the conversion of new technologies, like basalt fibre reinforced polymer composites and 3D printed concrete bridges to the industry.

== Early life and education ==
Lau was born and raised in Hong Kong. After receiving a 4-year craft apprentice training at an engineering company in Hong Kong, Lau moved to Australia where he received Bachelor of Engineering degree in 1996, followed by Master of Engineering degree in Aerospace Engineering in 1997, both from Royal Melbourne Institute of Technology (RMIT). While he was studying at RMIT, he worked for General Aviation Maintenance as an Engineer Trainee. Later, he worked as a research assistant at Corporative Research Center for Advanced Composite Structures (known as CRC-ACS). Lau returned to Hong Kong in 1997 and started his PhD in Mechanical Engineering from the Hong Kong Polytechnic University.

== Career ==
After completing his post doctoral research, Lau was appointed as assistant professor in HKPU in 2002 and promoted to associate professor and then full professor in 2005 and 2010, respectively. He also became the director of James Hsioung Lee Foundation Product Testing and Analysis Centre, which was funded by HSBC Foundation, at the university. In 2002, he was awarded the Young Scientist Award by the Institute of Science, Hong Kong. In 2004, the Hong Kong Institution of Engineers awarded him the Young Engineer of the Year Award.

In 2009, he was awarded the Ernest L. Boyer International Award for Excellence in Teaching, Learning and Technology, becoming the first person outside the United States to receive the honor. The same year, Lau was appointed the World Class University (WCU) Visiting Chair Professor at the Chonbuk National University under a programme funded by the Korean Ministry of Education. A year later, he was also appointed as visiting chair professor at the London South Bank University. He taught at both the universities until 2014. Since 2002, he has taken up an adjunct professorship at many universities worldwide.

Lau was elected as the Chairman of The International Multifunctional Materials and Structures Council in 2010. He then took up the executive directorship of the Center of Excellence in Engineering Fiber Composites, in Queensland, Australia. In 2012, he served as the Chairman of the Asia Pacific Initiative of the Institution of Mechanical Engineers.

HKPU appointed him the Associate Dean of Industrial Relations of Faculty of Engineering in 2014. In the same year, he was also appointed as the Alex Wong/Gigi Wong Endowed Professor in Product Design Engineering at the university. In 2014, he joined the King’s Flair International as the independent non-executive director. and was elected as international vice president of the Institution of Mechanical Engineers for a three-year term.

In 2016, he left HKPU and joined Swinburne University of Technology in Australia as the Pro Vice-Chancellor of research performance and development. After completing his first term as the international vice president of the Institution of Mechanical Engineers in 2017, Lau was reappointed for a second term.

Lau is a fellow of the European Academy of Sciences and Arts, the European Academy of Sciences, The Institution of Mechanical Engineers, The Hong Kong Institution of Engineers, the Institute of Materials, Minerals and Mining and The Royal Aeronautical Society. He has been serving as an Advisory Board member of the Future Fibre Hub in Australia since 2016. He is the editor of Advanced Materials Research since 2007, the regional editor of the American Journal of Applied Sciences since 2004 and the associate editor of Nanomaterials and International Journal of Smart and Nano Materials since 2005 and 2009 respectively.

== Research ==
While working at HKPU, Lau received numerous funds and donations from the industry and research foundations. His initial work was focused on the product design and engineering, studying the impact of different shapes and different materials in product performance and efficiency. In the late 1980s, he began research on composites, writing several papers in the area.

In the late 1990s and early 2000s, Lau conducted research on advanced composites optical fiber, Fiber Bragg grating and carbon nanotube. Developing on his research in composite materials, he wrote his first book entitled Advances in Composite Materials and Structures in 2007. After 2005, the greater part of his research began to focus on nanoparticles and bio-composites. He wrote several articles and two books Nano- and Bio-Composites and Multifunctional Polymer Nanocomposites.

In total, he has written over 300 articles and nine books. Alongside his research and academic work, Lau also participates in consultancy activities in the industry. He provided consultancy to several companies including Hasbro Far East, Bosch Rexroth, Johnson Stokes & Master and Philips.

== Awards and honors ==
- 2000 - The Sir Edward Youde Memorial Fellowship Award.
- 2002 - Young Scientist Award 2002, Award in Engineering Science Discipline, The Institute of Science
- 2004 - Young Engineer of the Year Award, The Hong Kong Institution of Engineers (HKIE)
- 2006 - Award for Outstanding Research (International)on “Nanocomposites for Space Applications”, The 14th International Conference of Composites/Nano Engineering, July 2006, Colorado USA.
- 2007 - Elected as Fellow of European Academy of Sciences
- 2009 - Winner of the Ernest L. Boyer International Award for Excellence in Teaching, Learning, and Technology
- 2011 - The 1st Technology Award in Heilongjiang Province, China in Space Smart and Structural Health Monitoring Research
- 2013 - University Grants Committee Award for Teaching Excellence
- 2014 - “Award for Outstanding Contribution to Education” granted by the Global Learntech Congress
- 2015 - USQ Research Giant Award on Nano-composites for Space Applications, Australia
- 2017 – Elected as Fellow of the European Academy of Sciences and Arts
- 2019 - Australia’s Research Theme Leader in Composite Materials
- 2020 - VEBLEO Best Scientist Award, granted by International Science, Engineering and Technology Conference & Webinars.

== Patents ==
- Temperature-compensated FBG strain sensor for statically and dynamically measuring mechanical strains of cement-based structures (2004/CN 03272851.4.)
- Rotary stepping actuator (CN 2005 1 0079594.0)
- Novel Carbon Nanotube/nanoclay composites (CN 2005 10079598.9)
- Sensory Re-educator (US 2010/0106050 A1)
- An FBG music tuner (US 2009/7507891 B2)
- Hygiene rubbish bin (US 2009/0008402 A1)
- A Fibre-optic transducer for simultaneous pressure and temperature measurement in fluid flow (US2010/7729567 B2)
- Automated testing for palpating of diabetic foot patient (US 2008/0193905 A1 and US2015/9017266 B2)

== Publications ==
=== Books ===
- Advances in Composite Materials and Structures (2007) ISBN 0-87849-427-8
- Multifunctional Materials and Structures (2008) ISBN 0-87849-378-6
- Research, Development and Applications (2008) ISBN 978-7-302-18475-1
- Multifunctional Polymer Nanocomposites Nano- and Bio-Composites (2009) ISBN 9781420080278
- Multifunctional Polymer Nanocomposites (2010) ISBN 9781439816820
- Polymer-based Materials and Composites – Synthesis, Assembly, Properties and Applications (2011) ISBN 978-1-60511-289-3
- Fillers and Reinforcements for Advanced Nanocomposites (2015) ISBN 978-0-08-100079-3
- Natural Fiber-Reinforced Biodegradable and Bioresorbable Polymer Composites (2017) ISBN 9780081006566
- Polymer-based Composites for Applications in Harsh Environments (2018)

=== Papers ===
- The revolutionary creation of new advanced materials—carbon nanotube composites. Composites Part B: Engineering. 2002.
- Effectiveness of using carbon nanotubes as nano-reinforcements for advanced composite structures. Carbon 40. 2002.
- Thermal and mechanical properties of single-walled carbon nanotube bundle-reinforced epoxy nanocomposites: the role of solvent for nanotube dispersion. Composites Science and Technology. 2005.
- A critical review on nanotube and nanotube/nanoclay related polymer composite materials. Composites Part B: Engineering. 2006.
- A critical review on polymer-based bio-engineered materials for scaffold development. Composites Part B: Engineering. 2007.
- Natural fibre-reinforced composites for bioengineering and environmental engineering applications. Composites Part B: Engineering. 2009.
- In-situ synthesis and characterization of electrically conductive polypyrrole/graphene nanocomposites. Polymer. 2010.
- Polymer membranes for high temperature proton exchange membrane fuel cell: recent advances and challenges. Progress in Polymer Science. 2011.
- Chemical treatments on plant-based natural fibre reinforced polymer composites: An overview. Composites Part B: Engineering. 2012.
- Critical factors on manufacturing processes of natural fibre composites. Composites Part B: Engineering. 2012.
- Epoxy clay nanocomposites–processing, properties and applications: A review. Composites Part B: Engineering. 2013.
