= Thomas Pringle (disambiguation) =

Thomas Pringle (1789–1834) was a Scottish writer, poet and abolitionist.

Thomas Pringle may also refer to:

- Thomas Pringle (politician) (born 1967), Irish politician
- Thomas Pringle (Royal Navy officer) (died 1803), Royal Navy officer
