= Andrew Pringle (cricketer) =

South African cricketer (born 1978)

Personal information
- Born: 7 February 1978 (age 48); Bedford, South Africa
- Source: Cricinfo, 1 December 2020

Andrew Pringle (born 7 February 1978) is a South African former cricketer. He played in thirteen first-class and five List A matches from 2000 to 2003.
