= Seton Pringle =

Irish surgeon

Seton Sidney Pringle OBE (6 July 1879 – 11 November 1955) was an Irish surgeon.

== Life ==
Pringle was born in Clones, County Monaghan, son of John Pringle; he was a first cousin of James Pringle KC, MP. Educated at Campbell College, Belfast, he entered the School of Physic in Trinity College, Dublin. He proved to be a brilliant student, winning a number of awards. He took his B.A. in 1902 and his M. B. and B. Ch. the following year. Two years later he became a fellow of the Royal College of Surgeons in Ireland.

He was appointed in 1904 to the surgical staff of Mercer's Hospital. During World War I, as a lieutenant in the RAMC, he worked in the Red Cross hospital in Dublin Castle, as well as other institutions.

In 1918 he joined the Royal City of Dublin Hospital, Baggot St., where his reputation grew. Within the next few years he was appointed consultant to the Drumcondra Hospital, Rotunda Hospital and the Royal Victoria Eye and Ear Hospital.

He was president of the Royal College of Surgeons in Ireland from 1934 to 1936.

He served for many years with the St John Ambulance Brigade of Ireland; having joined before the outbreak of the war, he was promoted to District Superintendent, a rank he held before he left for war. He retired his position as District Surgeon of the St. John Ambulance in 1944. That same year he married Eileen Blandford of Dublin (1887–1978). Blandford joined the St. John Ambulance Brigade in 1913 and in 1914 became District Secretary, working closely with the founder and first commissioner of the Irish District, Dr. John Lumsden (later KBE). Both Blandford and her husband remained attached to the brigade after their marriage. The brigade in Ireland became independent of the brigade in the U.K. for constitutional reasons, during the summer of 1945, subsequently the Council of the St John Ambulance Brigade of Ireland was set up, with both Pringle and Blandford returning to a more active role in St John Ambulance to help oversee this transition.
