= John Douglas Pringle Award =

Former Australian journalism award

- Description: Excellence in journalism
- Country: Australia
- Presented by: British High Commission, Canberra; National Press Club
- Status: Defunct

John Douglas Pringle Award or British Prize for Journalism, also known as the J. D. Pringle Award for Journalism, was a journalism award offered jointly by the British High Commission in Canberra and the Australian National Press Club. It was named after the distinguished Scottish-born, British-Australian journalist John Douglas Pringle.

== History ==
The award was launched in 1998 by the British High Commission in association with the Australian National Press Club. It was named after the distinguished Scottish-born, British-Australian journalist John Douglas Pringle.

The aim of the award was stated as "to promote a deeper understanding of modern Britain among Australian journalists".

In 2004, the award was referred to by the British High Commission as the "J. D. Pringle Award for Journalism".

== Eligibility ==
The award was open to Australian journalists based in Australia, in all media then current (print, radio, or television) with at least two years' experience.

== Prize ==
The award comprised a research and study tour to the UK for up to two weeks, including air fares, accommodation, and some expenses. The recipient of the award would be under the auspices of the Foreign and Commonwealth Office, which would make all of the arrangements.

== Winners ==
- 1998: Emma Macdonald OAM, for a study comparing how the UK was following Australia's funding model of university fee payment
- 1999: Sally Sara
- 2000: Claire Miller
- 2001:
- 2002: Melissa Sweet
- 2003: Sacha Payne
- 2004: Shane Wright
