= YouComm News =

YouCommNews was an Australian non-profit organisation which brought journalists, publishers and the public together for crowdsourcing of ideas and resources (including funding) for community-driven journalism. It was founded in 2010 by freelance journalist Melissa Sweet and Margaret Simons of the Public Interest Journalism Foundation (PIJF), then based at the Institute for Social Research of the Swinburne University of Technology in Melbourne. Its model was based on the United States' organisation Spot.us.

Members of the public could participate either by suggesting ideas for stories they would like a journalist to cover, or by donating money towards a story pitch. Journalists then either suggested a story idea or applied to fulfill an existing idea.

Publishers would jointly fund stories or purchase completed stories, with funds reimbursed to donors.

The project launched with a story investigating the suspension of a childhood immunisation program following many instances of childhood febrile convulsions in Australia.

== PIJF today ==
As of 2020, PIJF had evolved into an independent organisation, named Public Interest Journalistic Freedom, which is partially crowd-funded.
