= John Douglas Pringle =

Australian journalist, writer and editor (1912–1999)

- Pringle in the 1960s
- Born: John Martin Douglas Pringle; 28 June 1912; Hawick, Roxburghshire
- Died: 4 December 1999 (aged 87); Sydney, New South Wales
- Occupations: Newspaper journalist and editor/assistant, writer
- Years active: 1930s to 1980s
- Known for: Sydney Morning Herald (as editor), Australian Accent (published 1958)
- Notable work: The Guardian; The Observer; The Canberra Times; The Times
- Spouse: Celia Carroll (m. 1936; died 1997)
- Children: 3

John Martin Douglas Pringle (28 June 1912 – 4 December 1999) was a Scottish-born journalist and author who moved in 1952 to Australia, where he became a prominent newspaper editor and social commentator.

== Early life in the United Kingdom ==
Pringle was born in the town of Hawick, Roxburghshire, not far from the border with England. His father had inherited a part-ownership of Robert Pringle and Sons, a family knitwear business.

Between the ages of 14 and 19, Pringle was educated in England at Shrewsbury School, where he received a classical education consisting almost entirely of classes in Latin and Greek. It taught, he said, "the accurate use of words and the ability to concentrate on difficult subjects [but] it did not stimulate our creative powers (if any) or even our curiosity". He went up to Lincoln College, Oxford, where he took a First in Greats.

== Early career ==
In August 1934 he joined The Manchester Guardian (known now simply as The Guardian). He soon discovered that he had "no nose for news": he tried but failed to learn shorthand, loathed pursuing leads over the telephone, and lacked the push to get interviews from people in the news. However, he succeeded as a leader writer.

== Military service ==
During the Second World War, Pringle served as an officer in the King's Own Scottish Borderers. He saw action in France in 1940, then spent most of the rest of the war training troops in Inveraray in western Scotland.

== Other publishing ==
In 1944 he returned to The Guardian as assistant editor, then in 1948 he went to The Times as a special writer, chiefly on foreign affairs.

== Career in Australia ==
Pringle was tempted to go to Australia by the challenge of editing The Sydney Morning Herald, which was then considered the country's best newspaper, but also for health reasons: for a year from early 1950 he underwent treatment for tuberculosis and, for the rest of his life, survived on one working lung. He edited The Sydney Morning Herald from 1952 to 1957, but was frustrated by the paper's management, who insisted on confining the editor's power to the editorial and leader page, with no control over the news pages. To Pringle, this was "responsibility without power" and, when his five-year contract expired in 1957, he did not renew it. Before he left at the end of 1957 he wrote what remained his "best-known and most influential book", Australian Accent (published in 1958) "a frank discussion of Australian attitudes, politics, cultural and social mores".

He moved back to London to become deputy editor of The Observer from 1958 to 1963.

He returned to Australia in 1963. He spent a year hosting a public affairs television program on ATN7 in Sydney, Seven Days, but was uncomfortable on camera and soon decided "that most of the claims made for television were false and that there was something inherent in the medium which made superficiality and triviality inevitable".

Pringle became managing editor of The Canberra Times from 1964 to 1965, and editor of The Sydney Morning Herald again from 1965 to 1970, this time with control over the whole paper, not just the leader page. He resigned after disagreements with the managing director, Sir Warwick Fairfax, and retired from full-time journalism.

In his memoirs of his life in newspapers he said of the role of the editor:

It is more important to be reasonable than to be right. ... In a democracy a newspaper may be doing a useful service if it argues, fairly and logically, a view which may subsequently prove to be wrong. ... An editor is not god; he is part of the democratic process by which a nation argues and blunders its way towards the truth.

After retiring he wrote several books, and continued to write articles for periodicals, including Quadrant. He also developed an interest in ornithology, and wrote three books on Australian birds.

== Personal life and legacy ==
In December 1936, Pringle married Celia Carroll. They had a son and two daughters. She died in 1997, and he died on 4 December 1999 in Sydney, aged 87.

The John Douglas Pringle Award, given to Australian journalists, is named after him.

== Bibliography ==
- China Struggles for Unity (Penguin Books, 1939; Penguin Special, S7) - with 24 maps by Marthe Rajchman
- Australian Accent (Chatto and Windus, 1958) - illustrated by George Molnar
- Australian Painting Today (Thames & Hudson, 1963; The Students Gallery series)
- On Second Thoughts: Australian Essays (Angus & Robertson, 1971)
- Have Pen: Will Travel (Chatto & Windus, 1973)
- The Best of Ethel Anderson (Angus & Robertson, 1973) (editor)
- The Last Shenachie (Wentworth Books, 1976)
- The Waterbirds of Australia (Angus & Robertson, 1985; Birds of Australia series, vol. 2)
- The Wrens and Warblers of Australia (Angus & Robertson, 1985; Birds of Australia series, vol. 1)
- The Shorebirds of Australia (Angus & Robertson, 1987; Birds of Australia series, vol. 4)
