= James Pringle =

James Pringle may refer to:

- Sir James Pringle, 4th Baronet (1726–1809), Scottish politician, Member of Parliament (MP) for Berwickshire 1761–79
- James Pringle (Northern Ireland politician) (1874–1935), barrister and Unionist MP for Fermanagh & Tyrone 1924–29
- James Hogarth Pringle (1863–1941), Australian-born surgeon in Glasgow, Scotland, famous for the development of the Pringle manoeuvre
- James E. Pringle (born 1949), British astrophysicist, professor of theoretical astronomy at the University of Cambridge
- James Scott Pringle (1937-2024), American botanist and historian working in Canada
- James Pringle (Provost) (1822–1886), Provost of Leith
- James R. Pringle (1782–1840), intendant (mayor) of Charleston, South Carolina
