= William Pringle =

William Pringle may refer to:

- William Pringle (cricketer) (1881–1966), South African cricketer
- William Pringle (Liberal MP) (1874–1928), British Liberal Party politician, Member of Parliament for Penistone 1922–1924
- William Henderson Pringle (1877–1967), Scottish Liberal Party politician, Candidate at Berwick & Haddington and Ayr Burghs
- Sir William Henry Pringle (c. 1771–1840), British Member of Parliament 1812–1832
- William Pringle (footballer) (1932–2006), English footballer
