= Melissa Sweet (writer) =

Australian freelance journalist and nonfiction writer

Melissa Sweet is an Australian journalist and nonfiction writer. Formerly employed by The Sydney Morning Herald, The Bulletin magazine, and Australian Associated Press, she specialises in writing about human health and medicine.

== Early life and career ==
Melissa Sweet grew up in central Queensland. She enrolled in the Western Australian Institute of Technology (WAIT, now Curtin University of Technology) in Perth and earned a bachelor's degree in journalism and agriculture. She was awarded the WAIT Academic Staff Association Medal as the top graduating student of 1984.

Sweet worked as a medical writer for the Australian Associated Press for six years, starting in 1987, and later served as a senior account manager in healthcare for Hill and Knowlton, a public relations firm, from 1993 to 1994. She returned to journalism in 1994, working as a medical writer for the Sydney Morning Herald and a columnist for Good Weekend magazine until 1998. She was a columnist and feature writer for The Bulletin magazine until 2003.

In 2002, Sweet joined the advisory committee to the Australian Law Reform Commission and Australian Health Ethics Committee joint inquiry into the protection of human genetic information.

Sweet has been a freelance journalist, with a regular column in the Adelaide Independent Weekly until 2005. She formerly ran Croakey, a social journalism in health initiative, and as of 2015 was contributing to Australian Rural Doctor, Australian Doctor, Australian Worker, the British Medical Journal, Medical Journal of Australia, Australian Prescriber, Australian Nursing Journal, and other professional publications.

She co-founded YouComm News, an Australian open-source community journalism project, in 2010.

She had senior lecturer positions at the University of Sydney and University of Notre Dame.

== Accolades ==
The National Press Club awarded her the John Douglas Pringle Award in 2003. This included a travelling fellowship to the United Kingdom to research quality and safety in their healthcare service.

In 2008, Sweet was awarded the Obesity Society Media Award.

On completion of her PhD, Sweet was awarded the Parker Medal for most outstanding thesis for 2017 at Canberra University.

== Selected articles ==
- — (16 February 2010). "Intensive glare". Opinion. Australian Broadcasting Corporation.
- — (Autumn 2010). "In the apple orchard with Win and Petal". Memoir. Griffith Review. 27: 117–121.
