= Andrew Pringle Jr. =

United States Air Force general (1927–2021)

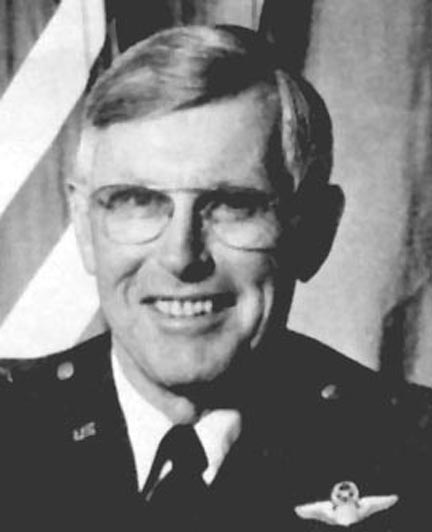
- Born: March 19, 1927; Seattle, Washington U.S.
- Died: December 5, 2021 (aged 94)
- Military career
- Allegiance: United States
- Branch: United States Air Force
- Service years: 1950–1982
- Rank: Major general
- Commands: Chief of Staff of Strategic Air Command; 3rd Air Division; Lowry Technical Training Center; 43rd Strategic Wing

Andrew Pringle Jr. (March 19, 1927 – December 5, 2021) was a major general in the United States Air Force who served as Chief of Staff of Strategic Air Command from 1980 to 1982.

Pringle died on December 4, 2021, at the age of 94.
