= John Pringle (baritone) =

John Pringle AM (born 17 October 1938) is a retired Australian operatic baritone. He sang leading and supporting roles with Opera Australia and its predecessors for 41 years (1967–2008), and with some overseas companies. He was strongly associated with roles by Mozart, such as Figaro and Count Almaviva in The Marriage of Figaro; the title role and Leporello in Don Giovanni; Guglielmo and Don Alfonso in Così fan tutte; and Papageno in The Magic Flute.

== Biography ==
John Pringle started his adult life as a pharmacist for five years, with a degree from the University of Melbourne. At the age of 28 music took over and in 1967 he won the Melbourne Sun Aria award. He had been singing in some amateur shows around Melbourne, and used his friendship with John Cargher to gain some valuable contacts in the opera world.

His debut was in the Australian Opera's 1967 production of Die Fledermaus, at the Princess Theatre, Melbourne, alongside singers such as Robert Gard and June Bronhill. Gard also appeared in Pringle's final performance in 2008.

In 1973 he was part of the company's historic first season at the Sydney Opera House, singing the role of Count Almaviva in The Marriage of Figaro. He did not appear in the very first opera production at the Opera House, Prokofiev's War and Peace, but he sang Prince Andrei in later productions of that opera.

John Pringle's repertoire included the title roles in The Barber of Seville (Rossini), Don Giovanni (Mozart), Falstaff (Verdi), Gianni Schicchi (Puccini) and Eugene Onegin (Tchaikovsky). Other roles included Malatesta and Dulcamara (Donizetti); Lescaut, Marcello, Sharpless, Ping (Puccini); Beckmesser (Wagner); Nick Shadow (Stravinsky); Golaud (Debussy); Politician in The Eighth Wonder (Alan John); Zurga (Bizet); and roles in Death in Venice and The Rape of Lucretia (Britten); Capriccio and Intermezzo (Richard Strauss); Lady Macbeth of Mtsensk (Shostakovich); The Tales of Hoffmann (Offenbach); and operas by Janáček, Cilea, Sullivan, Massenet and Gounod. He also appeared in musicals, such as Melvyn Morrow's and John Mallord's one-man show Postcards from Provence, based on stories by Alphonse Daudet.

He sang at Glyndebourne (as Nick Shadow in The Rake's Progress), the Teatro Regio in Turin, San Diego Opera; the Paris Autumn Festival and the Paris Theatre Musical; in Cologne and Brussels, and with the Australian state opera companies and symphony orchestras.

At the age of 65 in 2003, he learned what he considered his most difficult role, that of Doctor Schön/Jack the Ripper in Alban Berg's Lulu. His last major role was in Melbourne on 14 December 2007, as Leporello in Don Giovanni, a role with which he had become strongly associated. His final performance was in Sydney on 24 October 2008, a week after he turned 70, as Jaroslav Prus in Janáček's The Makropoulos Secret, in a production directed by Neil Armfield. After the performance, he was presented with the Opera Australia Trophy. Adrian Collette, CEO of Opera Australia, said: "John Pringle is one of the artists on which our company has been built. He has been there almost from the beginning and has stuck with us through thick and thin, a great actor, a magnificent singer and, above all, a real ensemble player loved and admired by colleagues and audiences alike."

== Honours ==
John Pringle was appointed a Member of the Order of Australia in 1988.

In 2004 he won the Helpmann Award for Best Male Performer in a Supporting Role in an Opera (Alban Berg's Lulu).

In 2007 he won a Green Room Award for his performance as Leporello in Mozart's Don Giovanni, against such competition as Teddy Tahu Rhodes, who sang the title role in the same performances.

== Sources ==
- Opera Australia
- Opera Australia
- The Dictionary of Performing Arts in Australia
