= John Quinton Pringle =

Scottish painter (1864–1925)

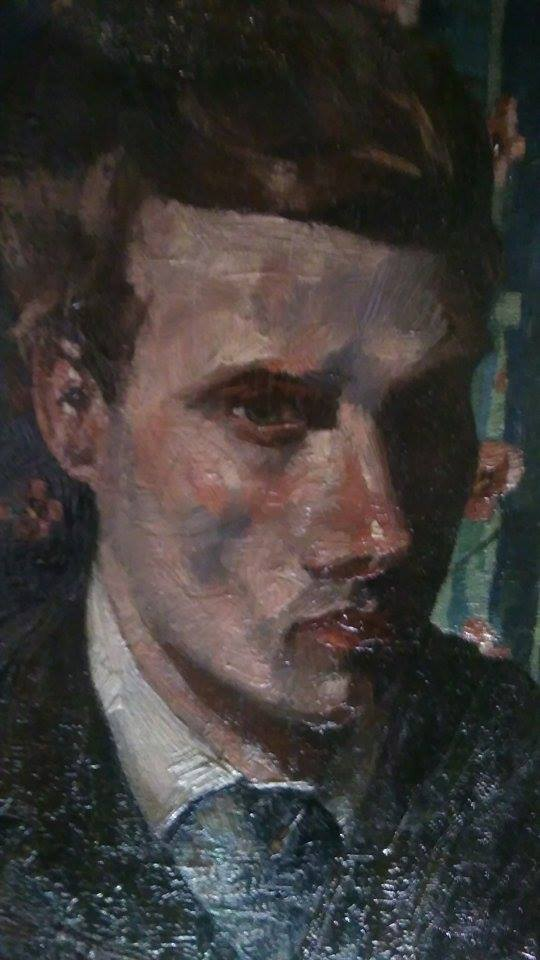
John Quinton Pringle (self portrait) c.1895

John Quinton Pringle (13 December 1864 – 25 April 1925) was a Scottish painter, influenced by Jules Bastien-Lepage and associated with the Glasgow Boys.

== Early life ==
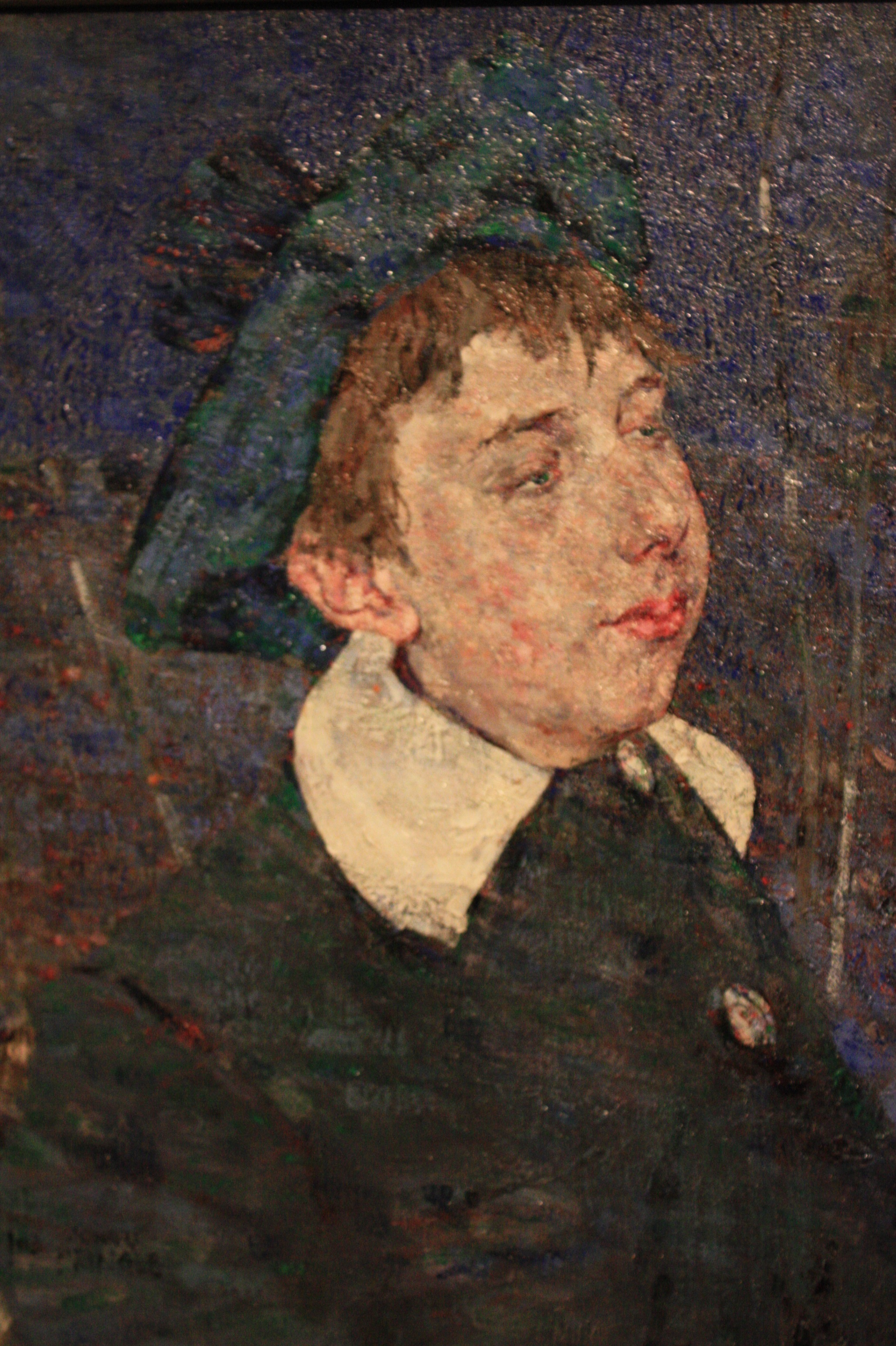
Boy in a Blue Hat. 1903. Oil on canvas by John Quinton Pringle

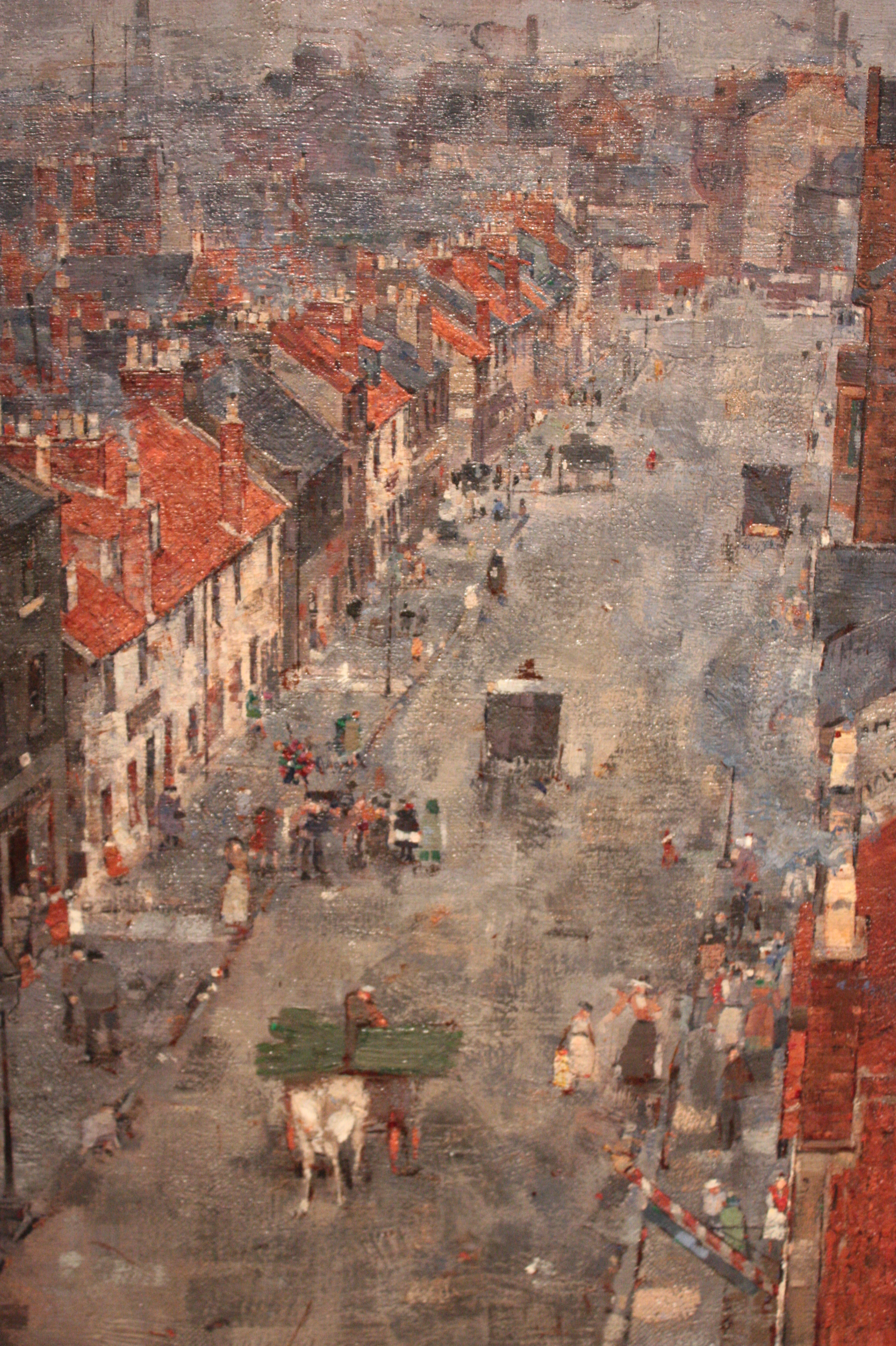
Muslin Street, Bridgeton, Glasgow by John Quinton Pringle (detail)

Pringle was born the son of a railway employee in Dennistoun, Glasgow. Though the family moved for a short time (1869 to 1874) to Langbank in nearby Renfrewshire (where his father had been appointed stationmaster), John received his education in Glasgow and later lived for some time in Maukinfauld Road, Tollcross.

He left school in 1876 and was apprenticed to an optical repairman. Twenty years later he set up in business on his own, offering optical and electrical repairs in his shop in No. 90 Saltmarket, near Glasgow Cross. It was a famously chaotically run shop, but Pringle kept it running as a business (albeit a sideline from his real love) for over 20 years.

Meanwhile, he pursued a vocation in painting. Pringle attended evening and Saturday morning classes (at the same time as Charles Rennie Mackintosh) between 1883 and 1888. In 1901 he won a gold medal for life drawing at the South Kensington national competition.

== Life as a painter ==
Pringle left about 100 works. Many are small scale oil on canvas, with subjects often including his family, friends, backcourts or local surroundings. He did not paint in oils between 1911 and 1921. Pringle visited Normandy in 1910 and spent a couple of summers on the Shetland island of Whalsay, (where he stayed with the local doctor, W.G. Wilson). In both cases he produced a range of sea or landscapes, often experimenting with painterly effects. Later he produced portraits (often miniatures) on commission, some of which are in the Victoria and Albert Museum, London.

Pringle was influenced by the French painter Jules Bastien-Lepage, whose paintings had been exhibited in Glasgow, along with those of other French painters, during the 1880s. He was most obviously influenced in technique, though the interest local subjects are another shared concern. In later works he used paint dissolved in turpentine and applied this in short strokes using a square brush. His palette in any one painting was limited but intense - his technique often giving a luminous or shimmering effect.

He exhibited at the Vienna Secessionist Exhibition of 1902 and in the Whitechapel Art Gallery, London, in 1914.

A Centenary Exhibition was held by Kelvingrove Art Gallery, Glasgow in 1964.

Pringle died in East Kilbride on 25 April 1925. He is buried in Sandymount, Shettleston, in the east end of Glasgow.

== Paintings ==
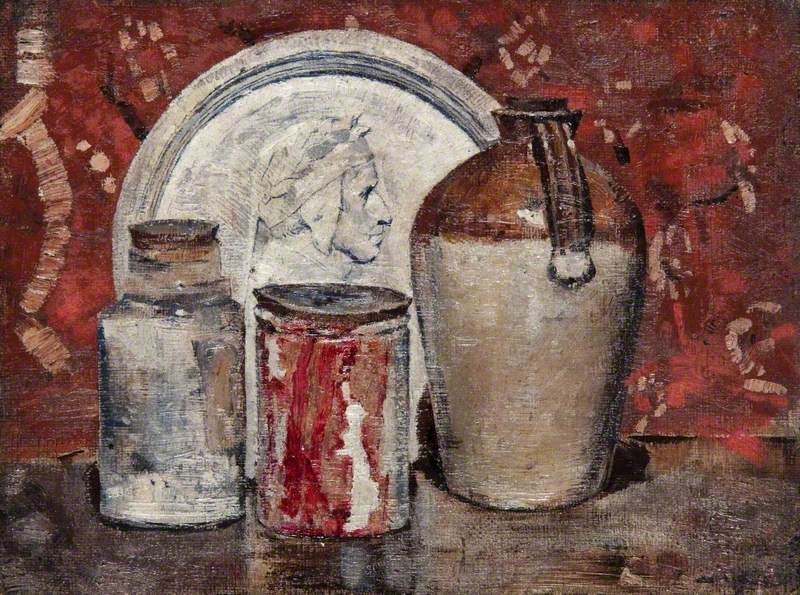
Still Life with the Head of Dante

- "Greenock", watercolour, (1886), sold by McTears 20.09.02
- "Parkheid", oil on canvas, (c. 1886), sold by Sotheby's March 2006
- "Self Portrait", oil on canvas, (c. 1886), Kelvingrove Art Gallery, Glasgow
- "Backcourt, Bartholomew Street", oil on canvas, (1887), British Museum
- “Tarbet Loch Fyne", watercolour, (1888), Hunterian Art Gallery, Glasgow
- “Children at a burn" (1889), oil on canvas, Tate Britain, London
- "Repairing the bicycle" (the artist’ younger brother, Barclay Pringle), oil on canvas, (c. 1889), Kelvingrove Art Gallery, Glasgow
- "Portrait of the artist’s elder brother, Christopher Nisbet Pringle” (c. 1890), oil on canvas, Tate Britain, London
- "View from the artist’s window in Maukinfauld Road", oil on canvas, (c. 1890), Kelvingrove Art Gallery, Glasgow
- "Muslin Street", (1896), oil on canvas, City Art Centre Edinburgh
- "Mrs Newberry and Daughter", oil on canvas, (1902), Hunterian Art Gallery, Glasgow
- "Bosham", Watercolour, (1903), Tate Britain London
- "Man with a tobacco pouch" oil on canvas, (1903), sold by The Leicester Galleries 2006
- "Two figures on a fence" oil on canvas (1904), Kelvingrove Art Gallery, Glasgow
- "Girls at play", oil on canvas, (c. 1905), Hunterian Art Gallery, Glasgow
- "Poultry Yard, Gartcosh", oil on canvas, (1906), National Galleries of Scotland, Edinburgh
- "Tollcross, Glasgow", oil on canvas, (1908), Hunterian Art Gallery, Glasgow
- "Portrait of a boy, bust length, wearing a grey suit and a pink cravat in a summer landscape.", (1910), Allposter.com
- "Caudebec" oil on canvas, (1910), Kelvingrove Art Galleries, Glasgow
- "Mrs Helen Meldrum", black chalk drawing, (1923), Hunterian Art Gallery, Glasgow
- "Mrs Helen Meldrum", oil on canvas, (1924), Hunterian Art Gallery, Glasgow
- "The Window" (1924), oil on canvas, Tate Britain, London

== Bibliography ==
- Dictionary of National Biography, Oxford, (2004) ISBN 0-19-865211-9
- John Q Pringle 1864-1925-a centenary exhibition (the catalogue) by J Meldrum and A Auld, Glasgow Art Galleries and Museums (1964)
- Scottish Arts Council Exhibition Catalogue (1981) by J Meldrum and D Brown
