= Robert Pringle (poet) =

American poet, schoolmaster and park ranger

Thomas Robert Pringle (July 16, 1943 – August 31, 2012), known as Rob, was an American poet, schoolmaster, and park ranger.

Of Scottish descent, Pringle was born in Columbus, Ohio, and graduated from Westerville High School at Westerville, Ohio, in 1961. He continued his education at Ohio State University for his first degree, then at Ashland University for graduate studies.

Until 1987, Pringle was a schoolteacher, teaching English literature and biology in the Westerville City high schools. After that, he concentrated on writing poetry, but also worked as a park ranger at the Inniswood Metro Gardens, as a rural mail carrier, a laboratory technician in bacteriology, a house painter, and as an attendant in a mental hospital.

In 1998 Pringle was the joint owner of a herd of Alpine goats.

His poems were published in Poetry Salzburg Review, Journal of the American Medical Association, Orbis, Envoi, Green's Magazine, Lilliput Review, and many others. Pudding House Publications published two collections of his poetry, Cold Front (1998) and Inventing God (2008). He was an editor of the poetry anthology Here's to Humanity (The People's Press, 2000). The Arkansas Tech University literary journal Nebo said of Pringle in 2010 that he had been "widely published in the U.S., Canada, and Europe."

In 2003, Pringle was still writing and had retired to live in the village of Galena, Ohio.

In 2004, Pringle’s poem "Ricardo Klement Speaks of Border Wars" won the First Prize in the Scottish International Open Poetry Competition.

On 3 April 1964, Pringle married Patricia Jean Hogue. They were together until his death and had three daughters.

== Poetry collections ==
- Cold Front (Pudding House Publications, 1998)
- Inventing God (Pudding House Publications, 2008, ISBN 9781589986572)
