= Swinburne University of Technology =

Public university in Melbourne, Victoria, Australia

Coordinates: 37°49′16″S 145°2′18″E

- Coat of arms
- Other name: Swinburne University
- Former names: Eastern Suburbs Technical College (1908–1913); Swinburne Technical College (1913–1992)
- Motto: Latin: Factum per Litteras
- Motto in English: "Achievement through learning"
- Type: Public research university
- Established: 1908 (technical college); 1992 (university status)
- Founders: George and Ethel Swinburne
- Accreditation: TEQSA
- Budget: A$834.13 million (2023)
- Visitor: Governor of Victoria
- Chancellor: John Pollaers
- Vice-Chancellor: Pascale Quester
- Total staff: 2,720 (2023)
- Students: 65,979 (2023)
- Undergraduates: 24,186 (EFTSL, 2023)
- Postgraduates: 3,864 coursework (EFTSL, 2023); 1,005 research (EFTSL, 2023)
- Other students: 20,180 (VET) (2023); 213 other (EFTSL, 2023)
- Location: John Street, Melbourne, Victoria, 3122, Australia
- Campus: Urban
- Colours: Red Black
- Nickname: Razorbacks
- Sporting affiliations: UniSport; EAEN
- Mascot: Razor the Razorback
- Website: swinburne.edu.au

The Swinburne University of Technology (or simply Swinburne) is a public research university in Melbourne, Australia. It is the modern descendant of the Eastern Suburbs Technical College established in 1908, renamed Swinburne Technical College in 1913 after its co-founders George and Ethel Swinburne. It has three campuses in metropolitan Melbourne: Hawthorn, where its main campus is located; Wantirna; and Croydon, as well the Swinburne University of Technology Sarawak Campus in the East Malaysian state of Sarawak. It also offers courses online and through its partnered institutions in Australia and overseas.

The university offers study programs in commerce, healthcare, teacher education, law, engineering, aviation, architecture, the performing arts and various other fields including in the arts and sciences. It also offers Doctor of Philosophy (PhD) research programs and courses in vocational education.

== History ==
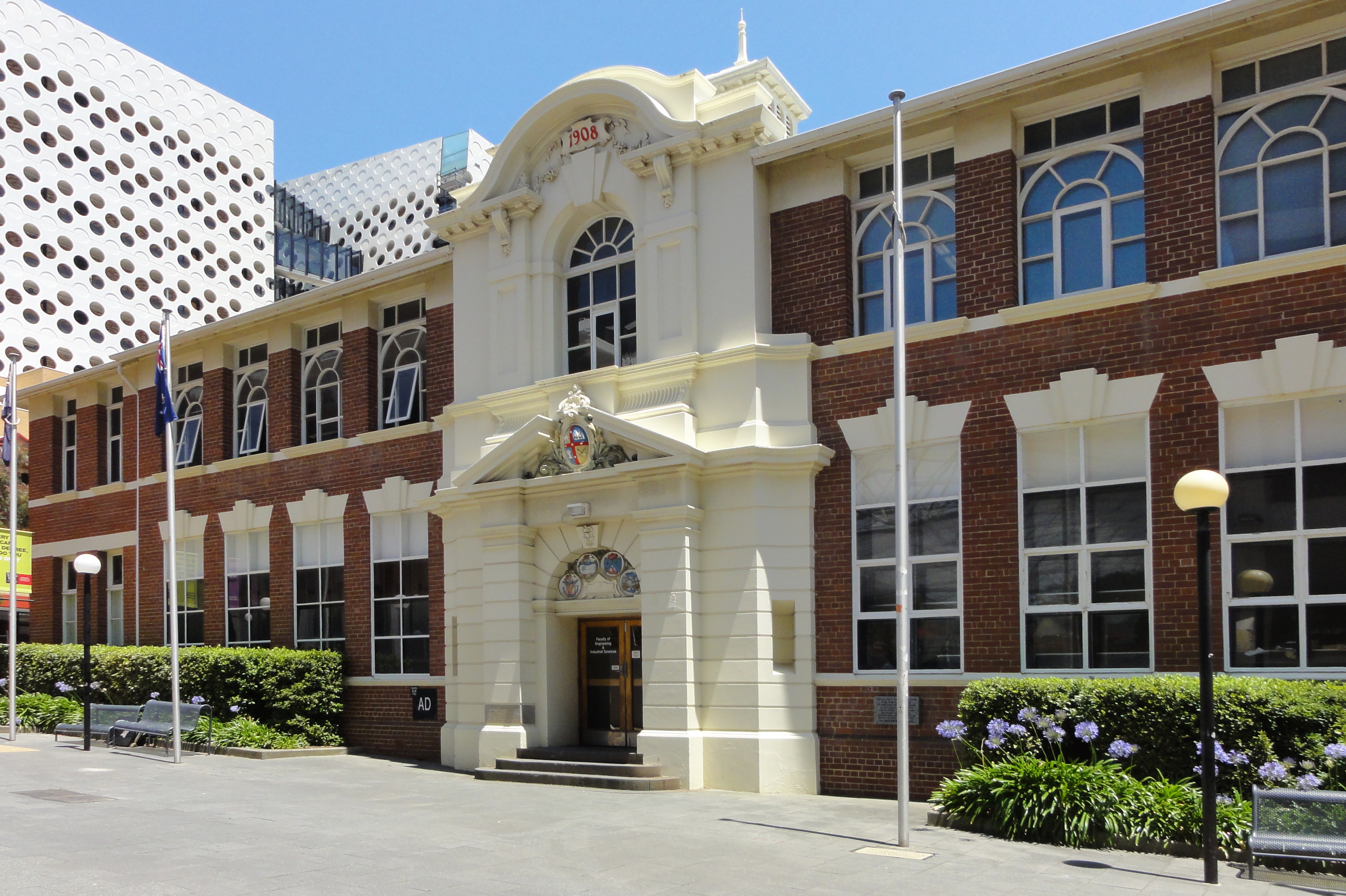
The Old Administration Building (1908)

The university began in 1908 as the community-owned Eastern Suburbs Technical College on John Street, Hawthorn, to provide further education to residents of Melbourne's eastern suburbs. George Swinburne MLA, with the backing of Premier Thomas Bent, was the driving force behind its establishment, and its most generous benefactor, hence the name of the university. By 1913, £10,111 had been spent on its establishment, of which £3,718 came from private donations (including £1,000 each from George and Ethel Swinburne), and the remainder from the government. The first director was the sculptor J. R. Tranthim-Fryer, who remained in the position until 1938.

In 1913 the institution was taken over by the state government, and its name changed to Swinburne Technical College. (Note: The operation of the Hawthorn College, a private institution founded by George Swinburne, MLA in 1908 – also known as the Eastern Suburbs Technical College, Glenferrie — was taken over by the State government in 1913, and the institution was renamed the Swinburne Technical College: Technical Education: The Hawthorn College: State Control, The Herald, (Tuesday, 29 October 1912), p.1. Archived 22 February 2022 at the Wayback Machine) It later became known as the Swinburne Institute of Technical and Further Education (TAFE), eventually shortened to Swinburne Institute of Technology.

In the late 1980s, the Outer Eastern University Planning Council advocated for a new university to be established in outer eastern Melbourne. The area had the second lowest university participation rate in Melbourne, after the Mornington Peninsula. Partially in response to this advocacy, in 1990 Swinburne established its "Eastern Campus" in Mooroolbark (sometimes described as Lilydale), on the site of the recently closed MDA Grammar School. However, students could not attend until 1992 due to council planning negotiation, and the campus was officially opened on 6 April 1992. By 1993, it was known as the "Mooroolbark Campus".

The Dawkins reforms to Australian higher education in the early 1990s led to many tertiary colleges being merged or split-up, and many given university status.

On 1 January 1992, the university was given the Prahran Campus of Victoria College and the co-located Prahran College of TAFE, both of which had evolved from the Prahran Mechanics' Institute (established in 1854). Swinburne attained university status on 1 July 1992 with the passage of the Swinburne University of Technology Act 1992 (No. 44 of 1992).

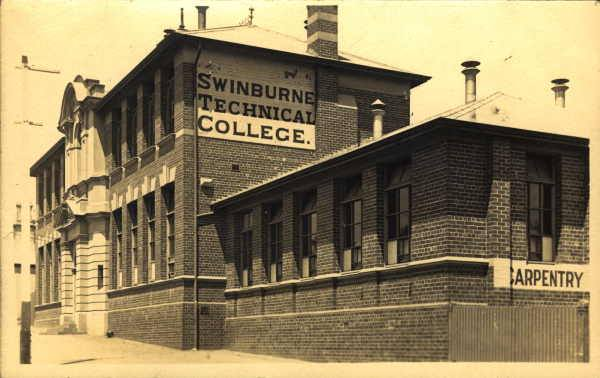
Swinburne Technical College (1940s)

In 1997, Swinburne opened a campus at Lilydale, replacing its nearby one at Mooroolbark. In 1998, it merged with the Outer East Institute of TAFE and began operating from campuses at Croydon and Wantirna.

In 1999, Swinburne established the National Institute of Circus Arts (NICA).

In 2000, the university opened a campus in Sarawak, Malaysia, as a partnership between the university and the Sarawak State Government: Swinburne University of Technology Sarawak Campus.

In 2008, it collaborated with two other universities in forming The Centre for Social Impact. In February 2011, the university opened the Advanced Technologies Centre, a 22,000 square metre building of modern architectural design at its Hawthorn campus, known locally as "the cheese grater building".

Following a series of funding cuts announced by the Victorian Government to vocational education in May 2012, Swinburne announced that it would close its Lilydale and Prahran campuses. Lilydale campus officially closed on 1 July 2013, and was taken over by Box Hill Institute in 2016. The university sold its Prahran campus to the Northern Melbourne Institute of TAFE in 2014. The site became the home of NICA, and in 2022 was acquired by the Victorian Government, along with Melbourne Polytechnic on the same site. NICA's degrees have been administered by the university and this will continue until the end of 2025, when they will be transferred to the Australian College of the Arts (Collarts).

In 2015, Swinburne launched its law school. Through a partnership with Leo Cussen Centre for Law, Swinburne Law School is the only law school in Victoria accredited by the Victorian Legal Admissions Board (VLAB) to enable students to accelerate their admission to legal practice by completing their practical legal training during the final year of their studies.

=== Swinburne Film and Television School ===
The Swinburne Film and Television School, which offered the first tertiary course in filmmaking in the country, was founded in 1966 by filmmaker Brian Clark Robinson (1934–1991). Part of what was the Graphic Art School became Film and Television, led by Robinson. The first course offered, from 1966, was the Diploma of Art in Film and Television, which was the first such course to be offered in Australia. In 1967 it was known as the Film and Television course of the School of Art. In 1976, Swinburne formed a department of film and television, with Robinson was appointed its head. Swinburne introduced a Graduate Diploma in Applied Film and Television, offering film, television, and animation courses. This was highly successful, with most of the graduates being employed in the industry afterwards. By 1983, the school offered a three-year Diploma in Film an TV, for school-leavers, as well as the graduate diploma, with over 90% of graduates finding employment in the film and television industries. In 1987, when Robinson was appointed dean of the faculty of arts at the university, Jennifer Sabine became head of the school, but Robinson continued to teach scriptwriting.

In September 1991 Swinburne Film and Television School celebrated its 25th anniversary. In 1992, the ownership and management of the school was handed over to the Victorian College of the Arts, becoming the VCA Film and Television School. In 1996, Barbara Paterson published Renegades: Australia's first film school: from Swinburne to VCA, based on her 1993 masters thesis, "Portrait of a film school : the history of the Victorian College of the Arts School of Film and Television, formerly known as Swinburne Film and Television School".

As of 2024 Swinburne School of Film and Television (SSFT) teaches filmmaking at Swinburne, and is a full member of CILECT (the International Association of Film and Television Schools).

== Structure and governance ==
The university is governed by the Swinburne University of Technology Act 2010, by which the Governor of Victoria is its visitor. As of 2024 the vice-chancellor and president is Pascale Quester and the chancellor John Pollaers (appointed 2019). It is governed by the university council, run by the executive team, while the Academic Senate advises the council on the conduct and content of programs and courses.

There were 2,720 total members of staff as of 30 June 2023, and its budget was A$834.13 million.

=== Schools ===
As of 2024, Swinburne's higher education branch comprises six schools:

- School of Business, Law and Entrepreneurship
- School of Design and Architecture
- School of Engineering
- School of Health Sciences
- School of Science, Computing and Engineering Technologies
- School of Social Sciences, Media, Film and Education
  - The School of Social Sciences, Media, Film and Education comprises: the Department of Education; Department of Film, Games and Animation; Department of Humanities and Social Sciences; Department of Media and Communication; Centre for Transformative Media Technologies; and the Centre for Urban Transition.
    - The Swinburne School of Film and Television (SSFT), within the Department of Film, Games and Animation teaches filmmaking, and is a full member of CILECT (the International Association of Film and Television Schools).

=== Other divisions, entities, and partnerships ===
Swinburne University of Technology also provides vocational education and training via five departments:

- Department of Business, Design, Media and ICT
- Department of Health, Science and Community
- Department of Trades and Engineering Technologies
- Knox Innovation, Opportunity and Sustainability Centre
- Swinburne Edge

Swinburne Student Life, which arranges O-week and provides support to students, is a controlled entity. Swinburne Sarawak (a campus in Sarawak, Malaysia) and Swinburne Online are associated entities, while Swinburne University is in partnership with six other universities in Open Universities Australia. It partners with UP Education running Swinburne College and Swinburne Open Education.

== Academic profile ==
Swinburne's research and innovation outputs are presented in the Swinburne Research Impact Magazine. It has functioning partnerships with industry, is known for its engineering-centered and catalytic revolvement educational spheres, and is the only academic institution in Melbourne that offers pilot training as part of its aviation degrees. Swinburne has its own cross-departmental innovation studio, which aims to speed up development and marketing of new ventures.

Swinburne researchers participate in international partnerships. It also has international academic partnerships/affiliations with US institutions, Stanford University's Hasso Plattner Institute of Design as well as Purdue University.

=== Research divisions ===
As of September 2021, Swinburne has six research institutes:

- Data Science Research Institute (launched 2017)
- Iverson Health Innovation Research Institute (launched 2017)
- Manufacturing Futures Research Institute (launched 2016)
- Smart Cities Research Institute (launched 2017)
- Social Innovation Research Institute (launched 2017)
- Space Technology and Industry Institute (2021)

The Swinburne Institute for Social Research formerly (until 2017) existed within the Faculty of Health, Arts and Design, It included the Public Interest Journalism Foundation (PIJ Foundation), which produced YouComm News. As of 2020, PIJF has evolved into an independent organisation, now named Public Interest Journalistic Freedom, which is partially crowd-funded.

The Centre for Social Impact Swinburne (CSI Swin), established in 2014, is (was?) in the Faculty of Business and Law. It is part of the national network that also includes the University of New South Wales, the University of Western Australia and Flinders University. There are many other research centres, including the Centre for Astrophysics and Supercomputing, the Centre for Mental Health, and the Centre for Human Psychopharmacology.

=== Academic reputation ===
University rankings

Global – Overall
- ARWU World: 201–300 (2025)
- CWTS World: 426 (Note: The CWTS Leiden Ranking is based on P (top 10%).) (2024)
- QS World: =294 (2026)
- THE World: 251–300 (2026)
- USNWR Global: 142 (24/25)

National – Overall
- ARWU National: 9–13 (2025)
- CWTS National: 18 (2024)
- ERA National: 23 (2018)
- QS National: 19 (2026)
- THE National: 14–20 (2026)
- USNWR National: 10 (24/25)
- AFR National: =22 (2025)

In the 2024 Aggregate Ranking of Top Universities, which measures aggregate performance across the QS, THE and ARWU rankings, the university attained a position of #238 (18th nationally).

National publications

In the Australian Financial Review Best Universities Ranking 2025, the university was tied #22 amongst Australian universities.

Global publications

In the 2026 Quacquarelli Symonds World University Rankings (published 2025), the university attained a tied position of #294 (19th nationally).

In the Times Higher Education World University Rankings 2026 (published 2025), the university attained a position of #251–300 (tied 14–20th nationally).

In the 2025 Academic Ranking of World Universities, the university attained a position of #201–300 (tied 9–13th nationally).

In the 2024–2025 U.S. News & World Report Best Global Universities, the university attained a position of #142 (10th nationally).

In the CWTS Leiden Ranking 2024, the university attained a position of #426 (18th nationally).

=== Student outcomes ===
The Australian Government's QILT (Note: Abbreviation for Quality Indicators for Learning and Teaching.) conducts national surveys documenting the student life cycle from enrolment through to employment. These surveys place more emphasis on criteria such as student experience, graduate outcomes and employer satisfaction than perceived reputation, research output and citation counts.

In the 2023 Employer Satisfaction Survey, graduates of the university had an overall employer satisfaction rate of 84.2%.

In the 2023 Graduate Outcomes Survey, graduates of the university had a full-time employment rate of 75.6% for undergraduates and 87.2% for postgraduates. The initial full-time salary was A$72,000 for undergraduates and A$90,000 for postgraduates.

In the 2023 Student Experience Survey, undergraduates at the university rated the quality of their entire educational experience at 78.1% meanwhile postgraduates rated their overall education experience at 78.1%.

== Campuses and buildings ==
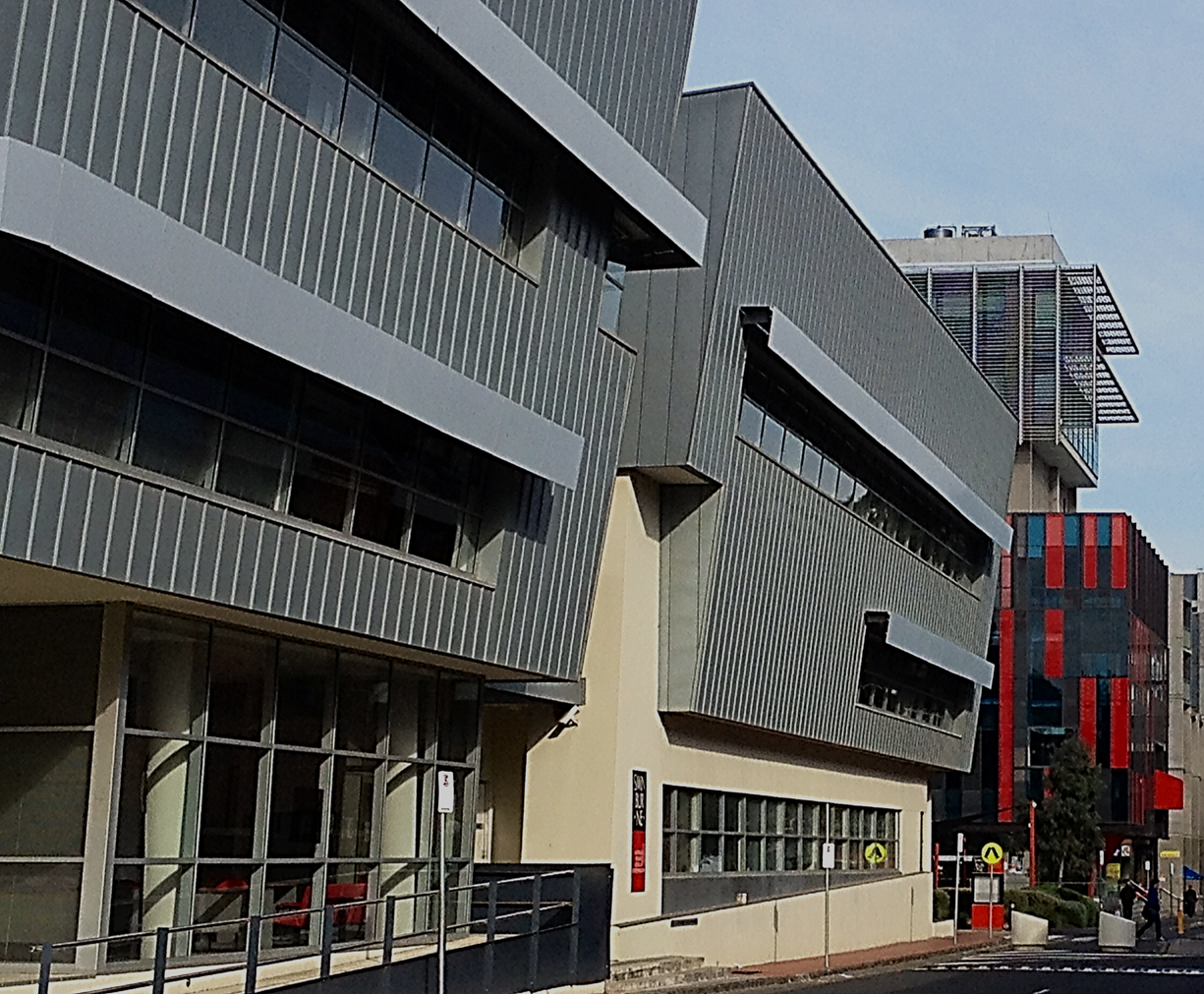
Daryl Jackson's Australian Graduate School of Entrepreneurship (2001), Hawthorn

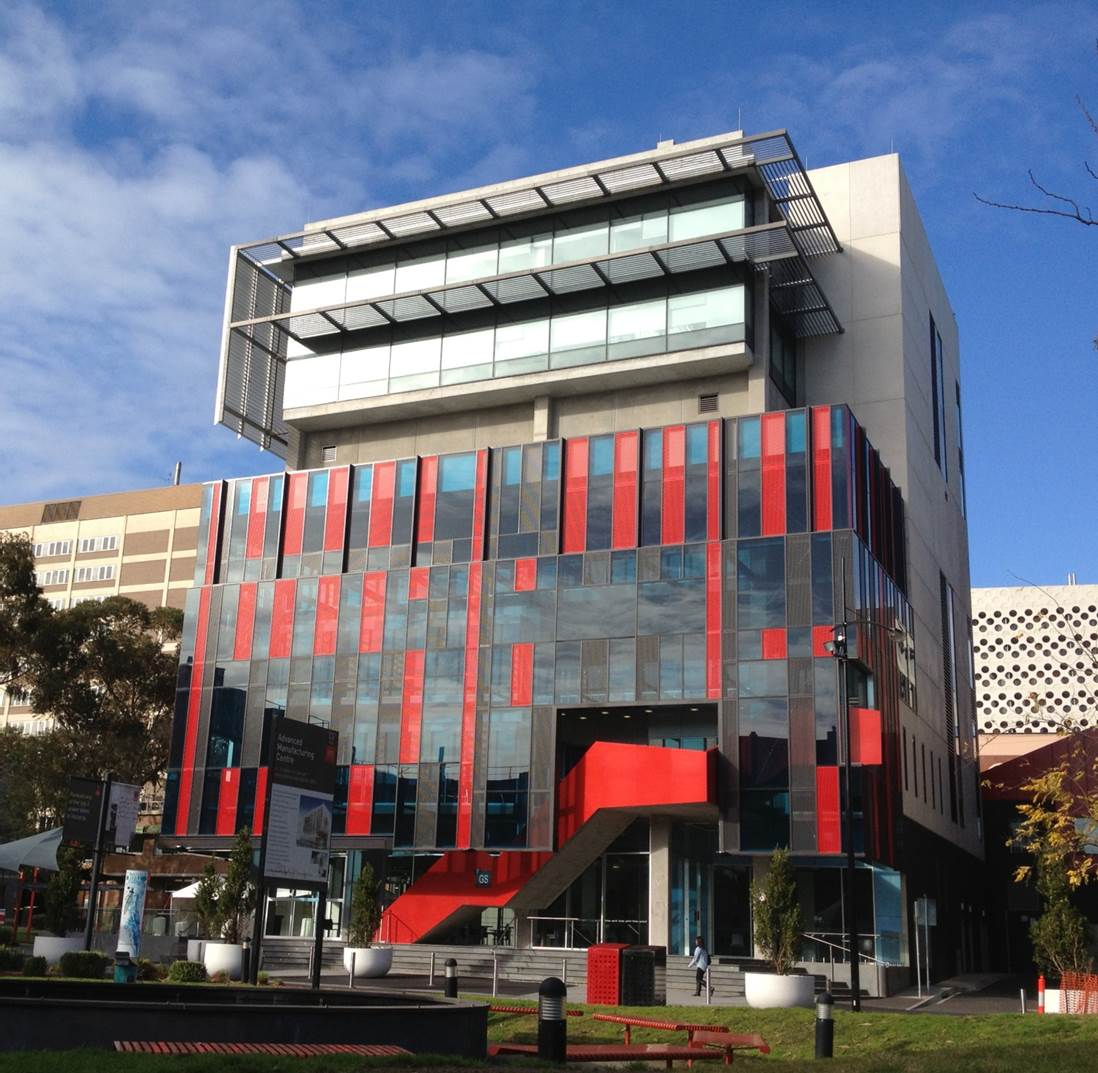
The George Swinburne Building, also known as "The George" (2011), Hawthorn

=== Greater Melbourne ===
- The Hawthorn campus is Swinburne's main campus. It hosts a range of vocational, undergraduate, and postgraduate programs.
- Wantirna is a TAFE-specific campus. The campus also offers courses in areas including health and community services, visual arts, business and accounting.
- The university's Croydon campus is a TAFE-specific campus, with a focus on training in trades such as building, carpentry, electrical and plumbing.

=== Malaysia ===
The Swinburne University of Technology Sarawak Campus is located in Kuching, Sarawak, Malaysia.

=== Others ===
The Parramatta campus, west of Sydney in New South Wales, is located in a public library building as a tenant.

Swinburne offers study programs in business administration, computer science, communication and media studies in Hanoi, Da Nang, and Ho Chi Minh City through its partnership with FPT University.

== Online education ==
Swinburne Online
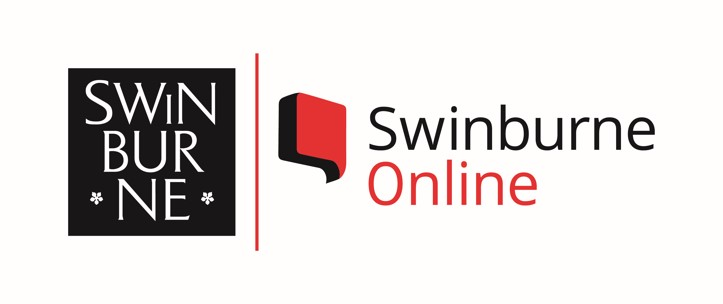
- Type: Private
- Established: 2011
- CEO: Denice Pitt
- Administrative staff: >200
- Students: 7,859
- Location: Melbourne, Victoria
- Campus: Online learning
- Website: www.swinburneonline.edu.au

The university's online arm, Swinburne Online, was founded in 2011 after a 50-50 joint venture with SEEK Learning seeking to capitalise on increasing demand for off-campus education.

Swinburne Online was originally created under the name Swinburne Direct, with an initial $10 million investment. It was formed to maximise the Federal Government's decision to lift caps on Commonwealth-supported university places from 2012, a policy which intended to increase the number of 25- to 34-year-olds with bachelor's degrees to 40 per cent by 2025.

Swinburne Online originally provided higher education degrees at both bachelor and masters level. As of April 2015, it offered over twenty courses in business, communication, design, education, and social science. However, as of September 2015, Swinburne Online has begun offering vocational education.

In April 2015, CEO Denice Pitt expressed a public desire to expand internationally to offer degrees to international students.

In 2014 Swinburne Online was ranked fourth in Australia's 100 fastest growing companies. Its earnings before interest, tax, depreciation and amortisation grew by 48% to $29.8 million in 2014–15.

== Student life ==
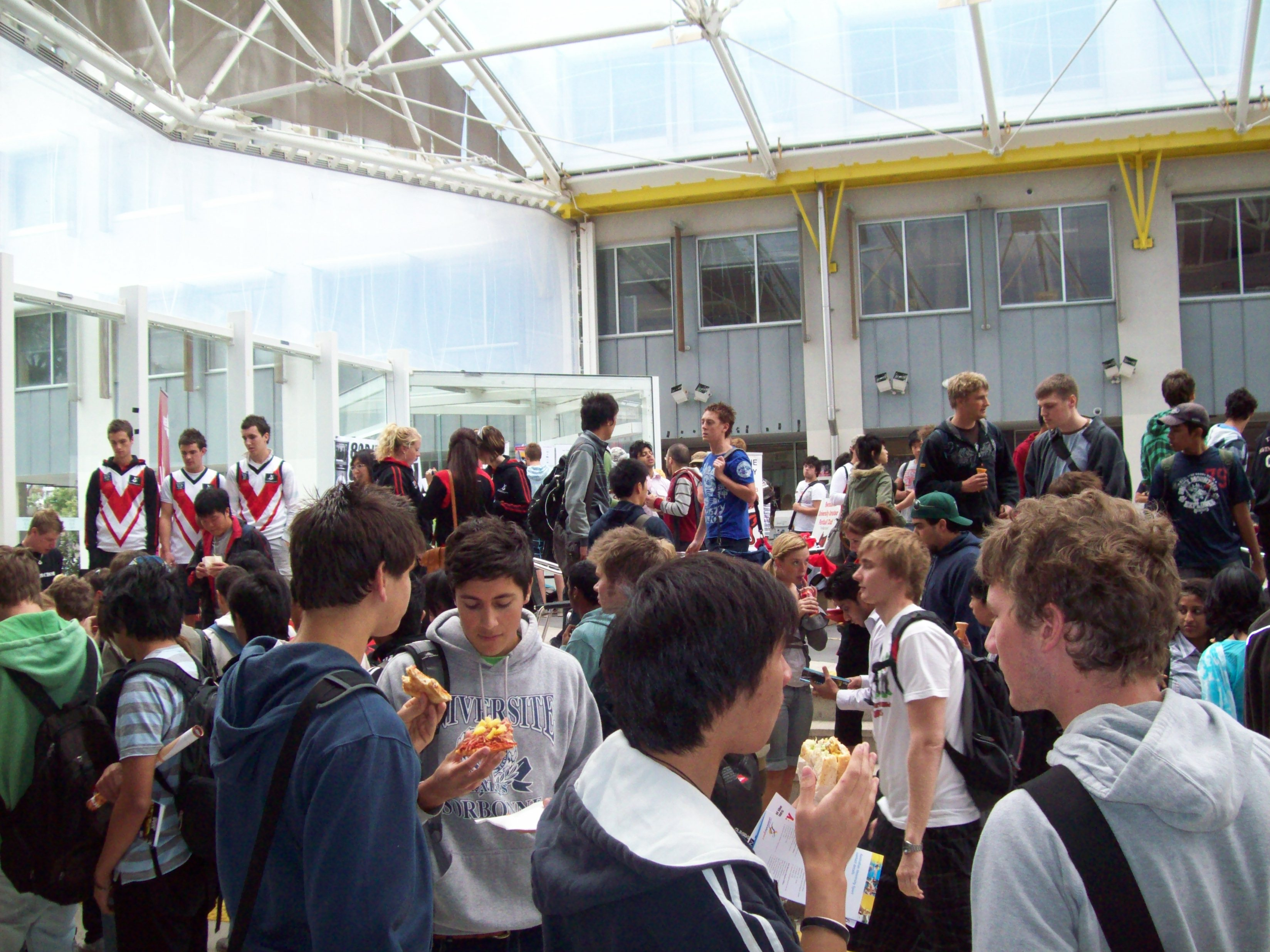
Students on campus

=== Student union ===
Swinburne Student Union (SSU) is the independent student representative body of Swinburne University of Technology in Melbourne, Australia. Membership is opt-in for all students.

== Notable people ==
=== Academics and staff ===
Member	Executive team	Period
Pascale Quester	Vice-Chancellor	2020–present
Chris Pilgrim	Pro Vice-Chancellor (Academic)	
Tara Magdalinski	Pro Vice-Chancellor (Education and Quality)	
Sarah Maddison	Pro Vice-Chancellor (Academic Innovation and Change)	
Bronwyn Fox	Deputy Vice-Chancellor (Research and Enterprise)	
Beth Webster	Pro Vice-Chancellor (Research Policy and Impact)	
Qing-Lon Han	Pro Vice-Chancellor (Research Quality)	
Alan Kin-Tak Lau	Pro Vice-Chancellor (International Research Development)	
Blair Kuys	Dean of the School of Design and Architecture [SoDA]	
Matthew Bailes	Director of the Data Science Research Institute and ARC Centre of Excellence for Gravitational Wave Discovery	
Karl Glazebrook	Laureate Fellow of the Centre for Astrophysics and Supercomputing	
Alan Duffy	Director of the Space Technology and Industry Institute	

- Geoffrey Brooks, professor of engineering
- Nigel Buesst, filmmaker
- Monte Punshon taught here from 1956 until her retirement in 1959
- L. Scott Pendlebury (1914–1986): landscape and portrait artist; instructor (1946–1963), head of art school (1963–1974) at Swinburne Technical College
- Peter Tammer, filmmaker and lecturer
- David Williamson: Australian dramatist and playwright (lectured in engineering and psychology)

=== Notable alumni ===
==== Swinburne Film and Television School alumni ====
- Gillian Armstrong: director
- Garth Davis: director
- Andrew Dominik: director
- Paul Goldman: director
- Geoffrey Hall: cinematographer
- Mark Hartley: director
- John Hillcoat
- Clayton Jacobson: director
- Chris Kennedy
- Michael Leunig, cartoonist
- Richard Lowenstein: director
- Nique Needles: artist, musician, and actor
- John Ruane: director
- Sarah Watt: director

==== Others ====
- David Baden-Powell: hereditary peer and scout leader
- Steph Catley: Australian footballer
- Margaret Gurney: Australian artist (Swinburne Technical College)
- Sam Hammington: comedian
- Amanda Howard: true crime writer and serial killer specialist
- Bridget Hustwaite, Triple J radio presenter, television presenter, journalist and author
- Rahul Navin: Indian bureaucrat and Director of Enforcement Directorate in India
- Vickie Roach: Aboriginal Australian activist
- Wahid Supriyadi: Indonesian diplomat
- Houman Younessi: International authority and expert on information technology and biotechnology

== See also ==
- Education in Australia
- List of universities in Australia
- National Institute of Circus Arts
- PMI Victorian History Library
