= Hume, Scottish Borders =

Village in Scottish Borders, Scotland

Coordinates: 55°40′N 2°28′W

Hume
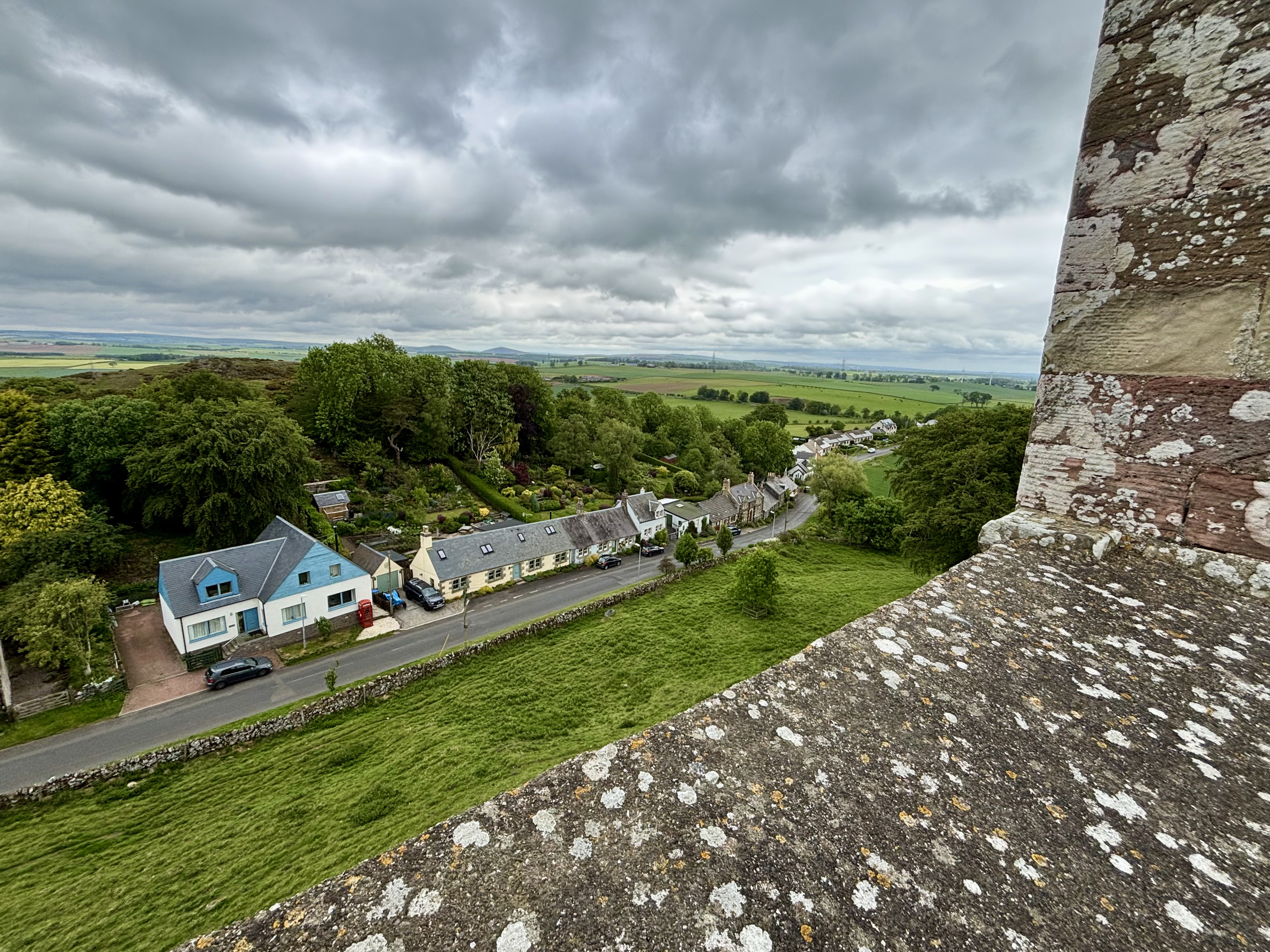
- Hume from Hume Castle

- Location within the Scottish Borders
- OS grid reference: NT707417
- Council area: Scottish Borders
- Lieutenancy area: Roxburgshire
- Country: Scotland
- Sovereign state: United Kingdom
- Post town: KELSO
- Postcode district: TD5
- Police: Scotland
- Fire: Scottish
- Ambulance: Scottish
- UK Parliament: Berwickshire, Roxburgh and Selkirk
- Scottish Parliament: Ettrick, Roxburgh and Berwickshire

Hume is a village in Berwickshire, in the Scottish Borders area of Scotland. On the B6364, it lies 7 miles (11 kilometres) from Kelso, Roxburghshire. It is close to other villages and amenities, e.g. Brotherstone Hill, Smailholm, Smailholm Tower, Floors Castle, Stichill, Lambden, Nenthorn, Ednam, Birgham and Gordon.

== See also ==
- Hume Castle
- Hume Crags
- List of places in the Scottish Borders
