= Hugh Scott of Gala =

Scottish soldier

Major Hugh Scott later Scott-Gordon JP DL FRSE (1822–1877), 9th Laird of Gala, was a 19th-century Scottish landowner, antiquarian and British Army officer.

== Family background ==
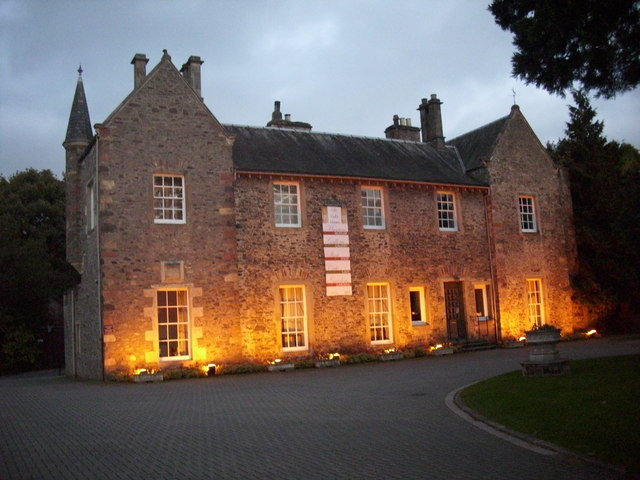
Gala House, Roxburghshire

Members of the minor Scottish nobility, his family became barons of Gala in 1640 by the marriage of Walter Scott of Deuchar (died 1645) and Jean Pringle (died 1623), daughter and heiress of Sir James Pringle of Smailholm and Gala.

Born on 9 December 1822 at Bellie near Elgin, he was the eldest surviving son of John Scott, 8th Laird of Gala (1790–1840) by his wife Magdalen née Hope (1792–1873), youngest daughter of Sir Archibald Hope of Craighall and Pinkie, 9th Baronet.

A cousin of Sir Walter Scott and great-nephew of Admiral Sir George Scott, his grandfather was Colonel Hugh Scott of Scala (1764–1795), and Professor Alexander Monro of Craiglockhart was a great-grandfather.

== Career ==
In family tradition, Scott was commissioned into the 92nd Regiment of Foot becoming a Captain, then promoted Major he served with the Dumfries, Roxburgh and Selkirkshire Militia.

Upon his father's death in 1840, Scott succeeded as the 9th Laird and inherited the Gala estate, near Galashiels, Roxburghshire.

In 1853 Scott was elected a Fellow of the Royal Society of Edinburgh, and in 1872 he commissioned Edinburgh architect David Bryce to redesign Gala House in the Scots baronial style. Completed in 1876, Gala remained the family home until 1976 before being demolished in 1983. Old Gala House is now a museum.

== Marriage and descendants ==
In 1857 Scott married Elizabeth Isabella Johnstone-Gordon (died 1917), eldest daughter and heiress of Captain Charles Kinnaird Johnstone-Gordon of Craig and Kincardine, and died at Hyères in France on 19 December 1877, leaving three sons and a daughter:

- John Henry Francis Kinnaird Scott of Gala JP DL (1859–1935);
- Captain Hugh James Elibank Scott-Makdougall of Makerstoun (1861–1934), late Haddington Artillery Militia, inherited the Makerstoun Estate near Kelso in 1890 from Scott relatives, by entail from their cousin Anna-Maria Hay Makdougall of Makerstoun (1786–1862) wife of General Sir Thomas Makdougall-Brisbane, 1st Baronet. Captain Hugh Scott-Makdougall married in 1893 Agnes Jenkinson (died 1955), leaving a son and two daughters:
  - Captain Henry John Alexander Scott-Makdougall later Makdougall Scott of Gala JP DL (1901–1940), late King's Royal Rifle Corps;
  - Barbara Makdougall Scott (1894–1979), married Major Sir George Duckworth-King, 6th Baronet (1891–1952), leaving issue two daughters (including Anne Duckworth-King (1915–2011), who married Christopher Willoughby Jardine CB);
  - Jean Makdougall Scott (1897–1990), married Philip Beaumont Frere MC, senior partner in Frere Cholmeley, having (with a daughter):
    - Christopher Bartle Hugh Frere later Scott of Gala (1924–1997), married 1948 Anne Kerr (died 1999), granddaughter of the Revd Lord Henry Kerr JP, leaving:
      - John Philip Henry Schomberg Scott (born 1952), 13th Laird of Gala, Past Master Grocer, married Jacqueline Rae, elder daughter of Captain Colin Rae MC, having two sons;
      - Dominic Scott (born 1955), married Melanie Charrington, having a son and four daughters;
      - Julian Scott (1956–1984), married Alexandra Hough;
      - Rupert Scott later Montagu-Scott (born 1958), married the Hon. Mary Douglas-Scott-Montagu, having a son and a daughter;
      - Sebastian Scott (born 1961);
- Major Charles Archibald Ramsay Scott (1863–1920), late South Wales Borderers, married in 1911 Violet Milligan, and died without issue on 21 March 1920 at Auckland, New Zealand;
- Magdalen Augusta Lavinia Scott CBE (1862–1961), married in 1898 General Sir Francis Davies KCB KCMG KCVO, of Elmley Castle, Pershore, Worcestershire.

== See also ==
- Baronage of Scotland
