= Stichill Kirk =

Coordinates: 55.6372°N 2.4604°W

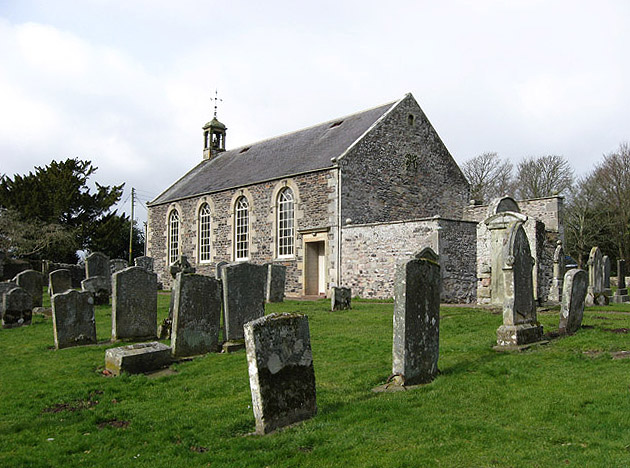
Stichill Parish Church

Stichill Kirk is an ancient church situated in the village of Stichill in the old county of Roxburghshire, now part of the Scottish Borders Council in Scotland. The village lies 2 miles (3.2 km) north of the abbey town of Kelso on the B6643 road and is at grid reference NT713383.

== History ==
The meaning of the name 'Stichill' is thought to come from the Gaelic signifying a declivity meaning a downward slope, as on a hill. The first mention of the church came in 1124 when Gilleb was described as being the Presbyter of Stichil. In the early years, the church of Stichil was in the patronage of the Earls of Dunbar but later in the century, the monks of Kelso obtained both the parish and the church. That situation did not change until the Scottish Reformation in the 1560s. and some of the early clerics were:

- Gilleb. Presbyter–1124
- W. de Stichel–1153
- Goze, Goscelno, Sacerdos of Stichill–1158

== Post Reformation ==
The first known minister after the Reformation was Rev. William Hood, who was the incumbent from 1567 until 1577. In 1640 the parishes of Stichill and Hume were united and the Parochial records have been kept since that time. The present parish church was built in 1770 before a virtual reconstruction in 1869 followed by major renovation in 1906. A secession church - The Associate Church of Stichill was built in 1773 but became part of The United Free Church of Scotland 1900. Finally, in 1938, that church united with Stichill Parish Church. (The Associate Church was also known as the Cairns Memorial Church) In the 18th. century the Secession (Associate) Church was famous for its annual "Holy Fairs" The old Associate Church, is now a private home. The parish church is now linked with the parishes of Smailhom, Hume, Roxburgh, Ednam and Nenthorn.

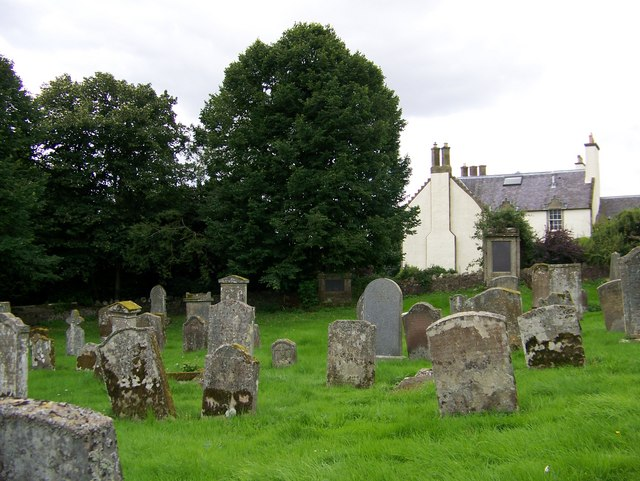
A corner of the graveyard at Stichill Kirk

== Notable Minister ==
Reverend George Gunn M.A. who was minister at Stichill from 1878 until 1900, he preached his last sermon on 5 November 1899.

== See also ==
- Stichill
- List of places in the Scottish Borders
- List of places in East Lothian
- List of places in Midlothian
- List of places in Scotland
