= Discharging arch =

Architectural element

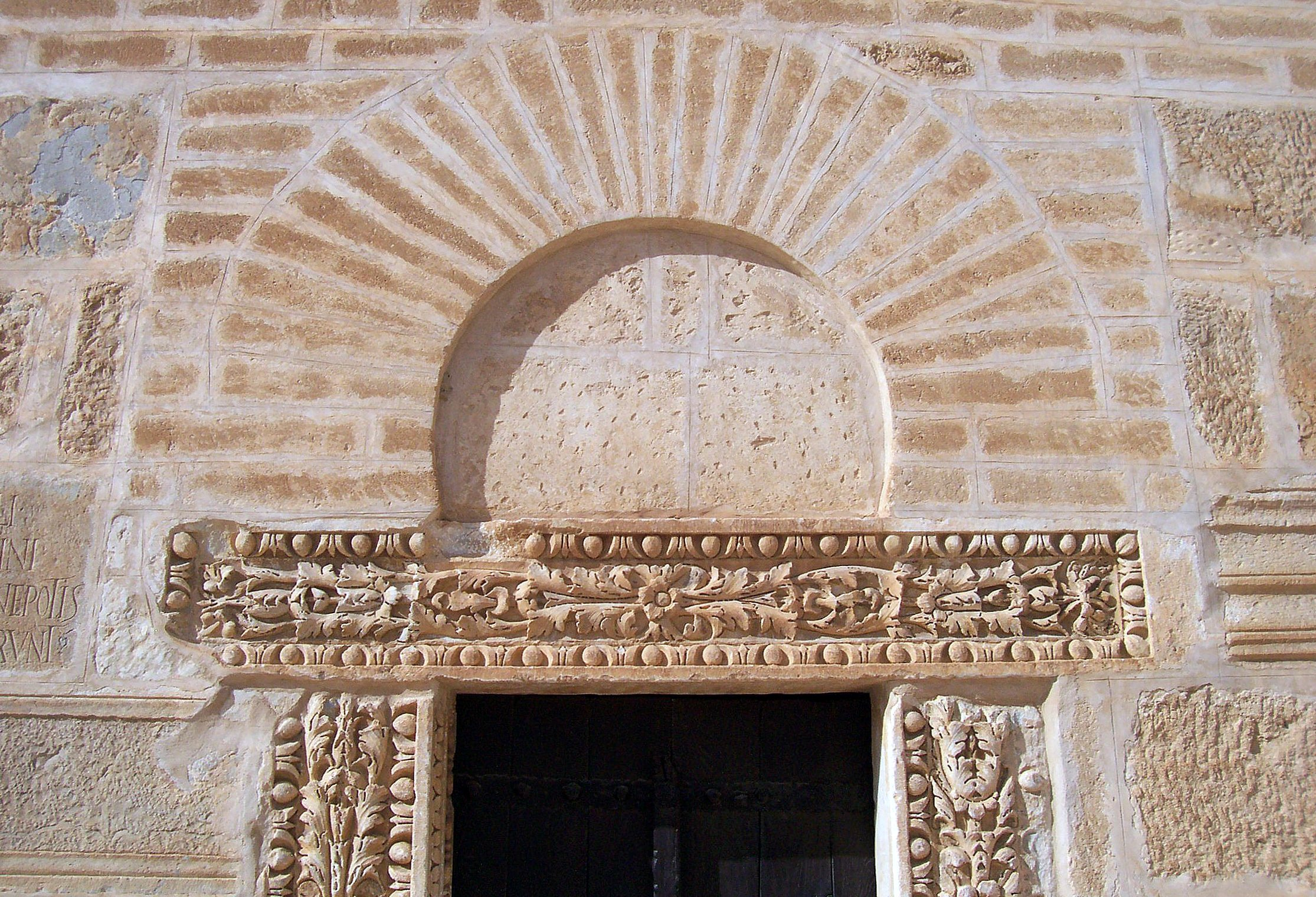
Discharging arch of the door of the minaret in the Great Mosque of Kairouan, also called the Mosque of Uqba, in Tunisia

A discharging arch or relieving arch is an arch built over a lintel or architrave to take off the superincumbent weight.

== History ==
The earliest example is found in the Great Pyramid of Giza, over the lintels of the entrance passage to the tomb: it consisted of two stones only, resting one against the other. The same object was attained in the Lion Gate and the Treasury of Atreus, both in Mycenae, and in other examples in Greece, where the stones laid in horizontal courses, one projecting over the other, left a triangular hollow space above the lintel of the door, which was subsequently filled in by vertical sculptured stone panels.

The Romans frequently employed the discharging arch, and inside the portico of the Pantheon the architraves have such arches over them. In the Golden Gateway of the palace of Diocletian at Split the discharging arches, semicircular in form, were adopted as architectural features and decorated with mouldings. The same is found in the synagogues in Palestine of the 2nd century; and later, in Byzantine architecture, these moulded archivolts above an architrave constitute one of the characteristics of the style. In the early Christian churches in Rome, where a colonnade divided off the nave and aisles, discharging arches are turned in the frieze just above the architraves.

== Gallery ==
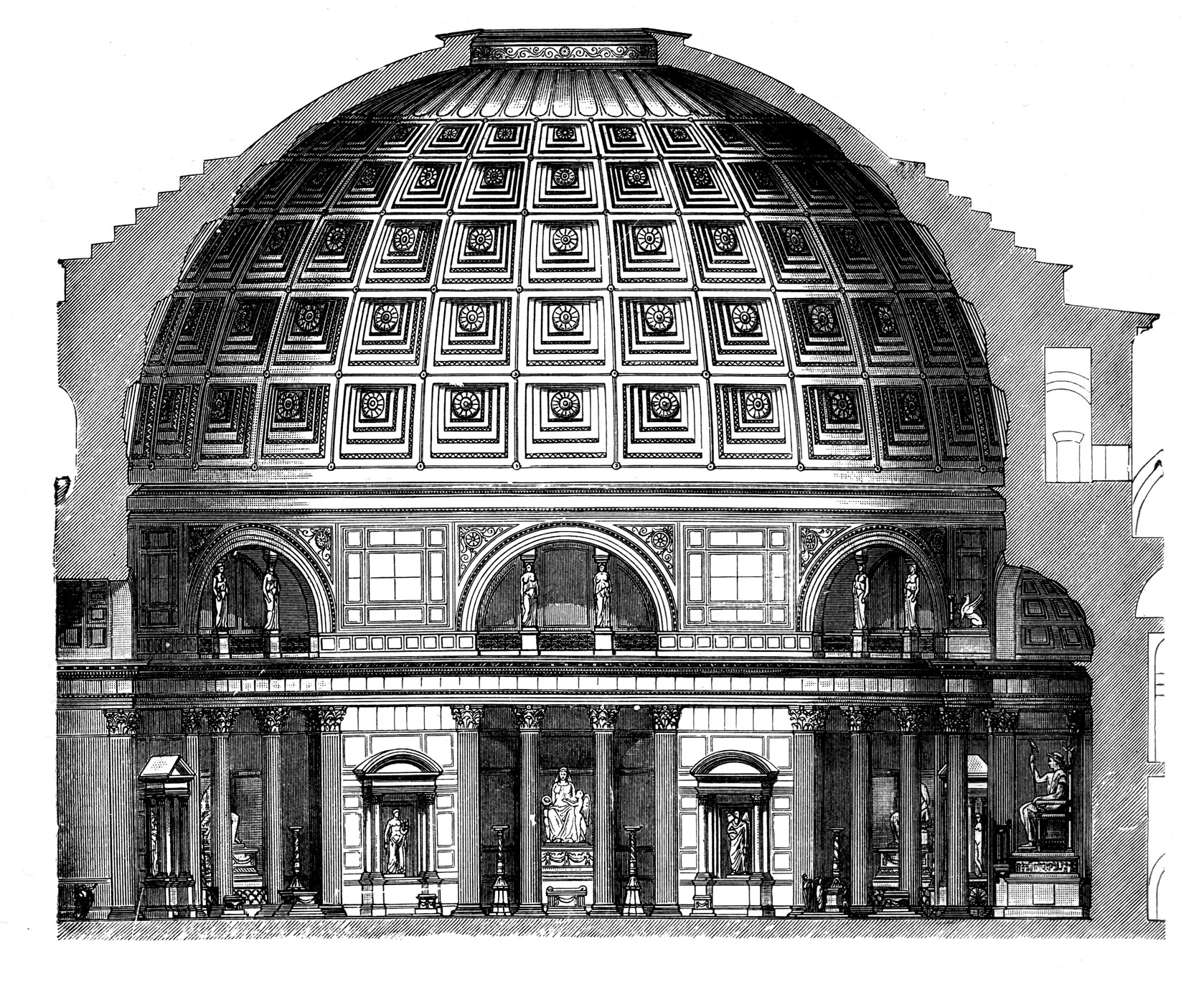
Cross section of the Pantheon showing the discharging arch on the right side

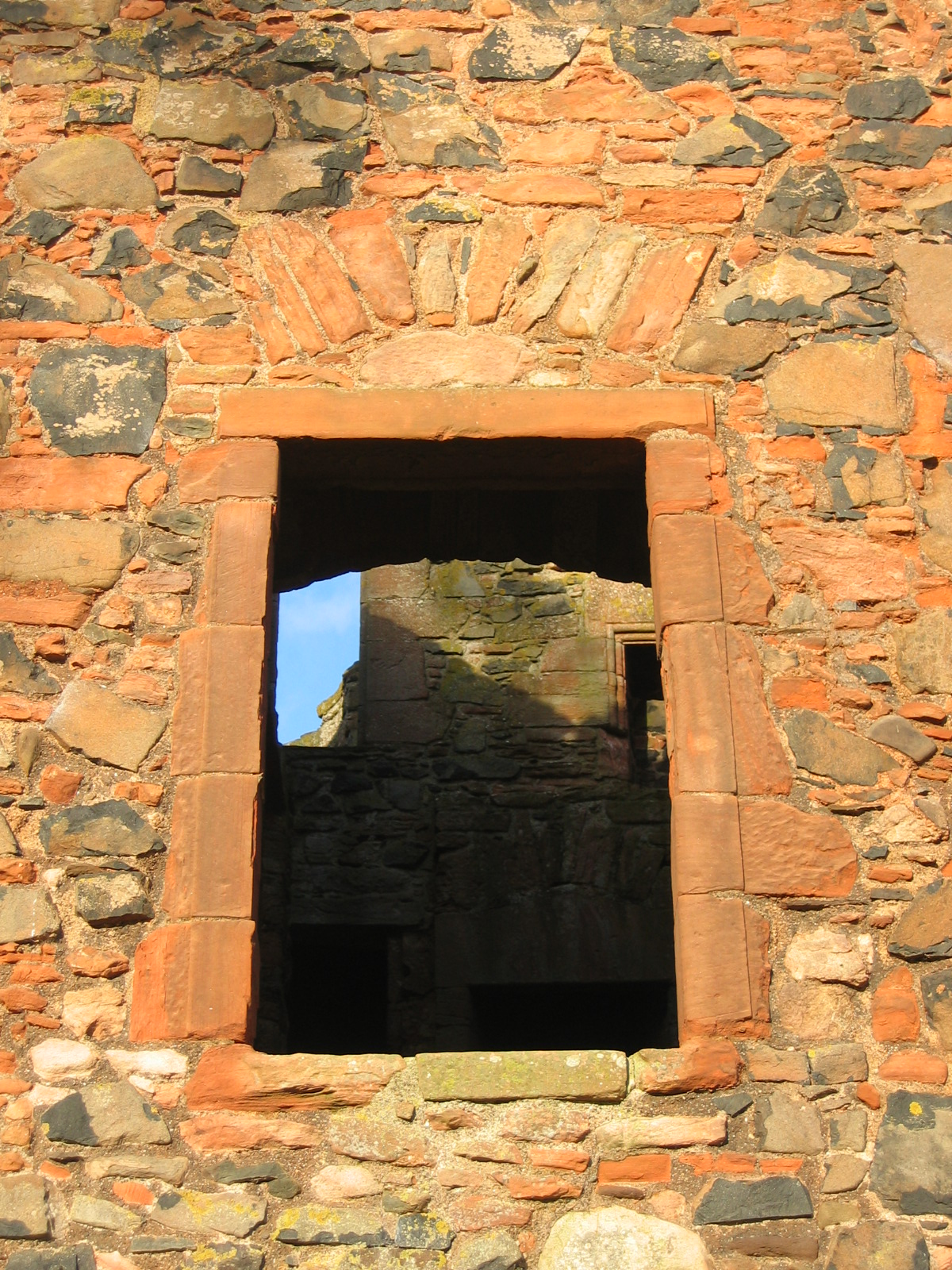
Example of relieving arch at Greenknowe Tower

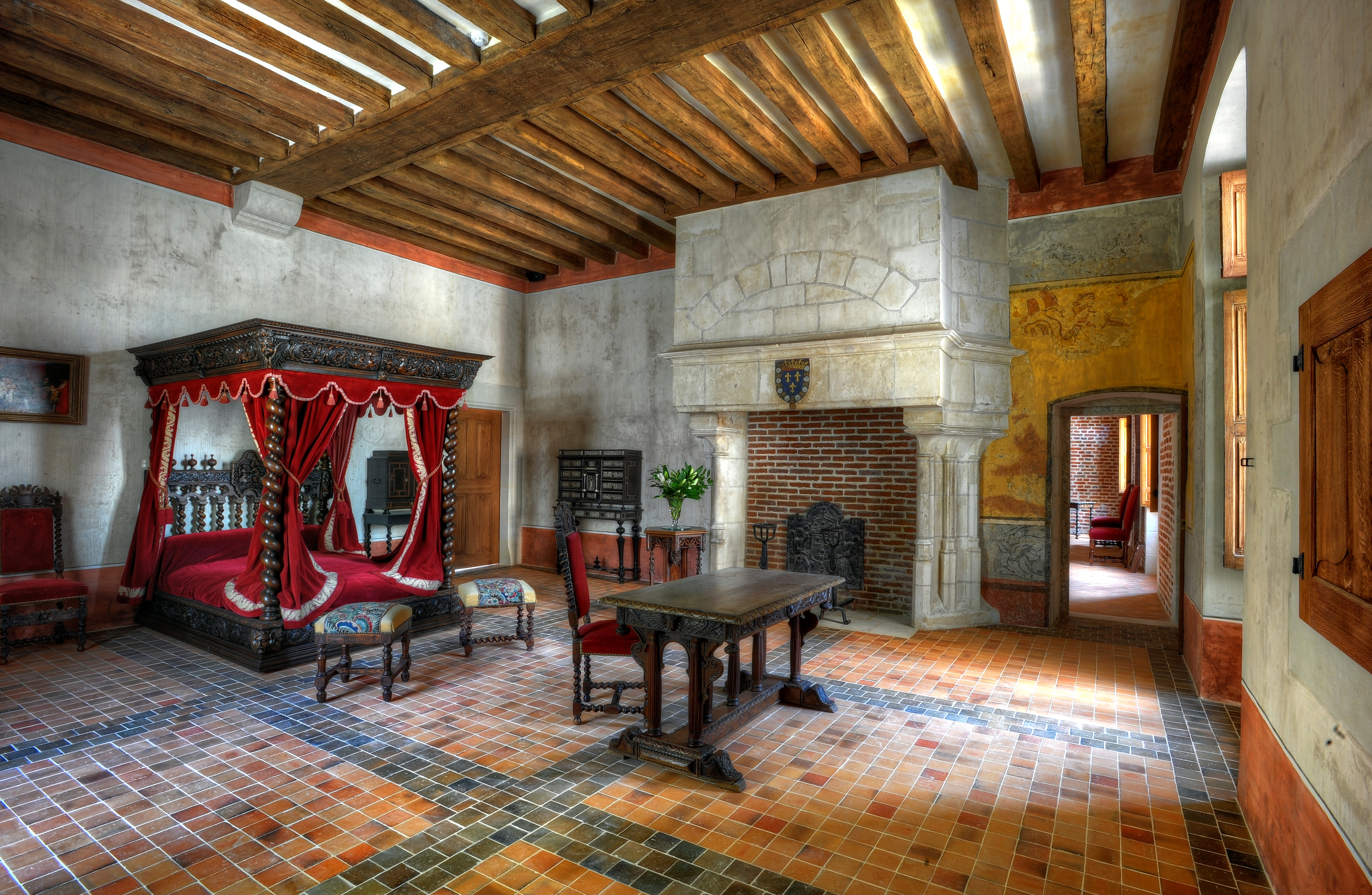
Discharging arch above fireplace in the chamber of Leonardo da Vinci at the Château du Clos Lucé
