= Evangelos Apostolou =

Greek Syriza politician

Evangelos Apostolou MP
- Βαγγέλης Αποστόλου
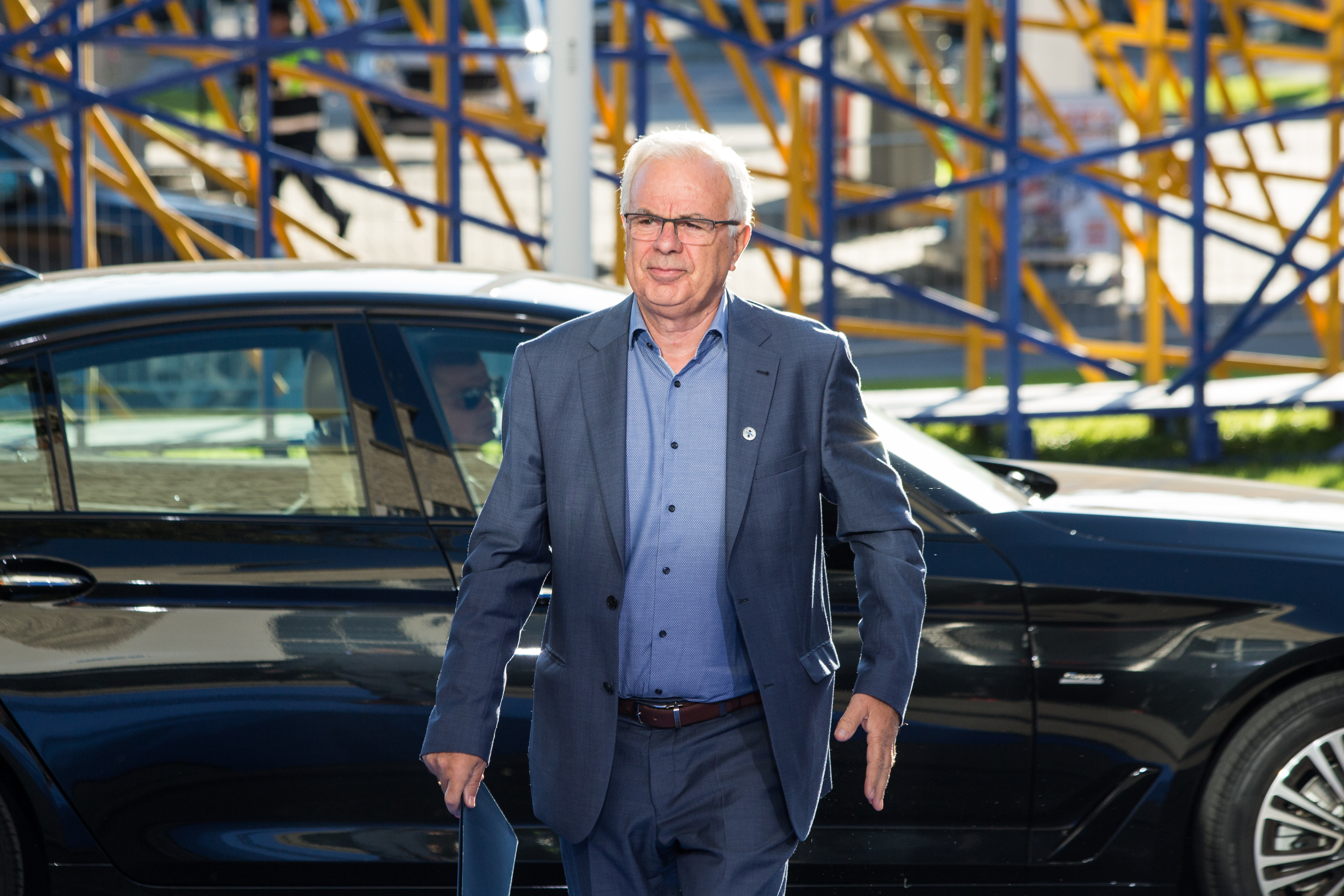

Minister of Agricultural Development and Food
- In office 23 September 2015 – 28 August 2018
- Prime Minister: Alexis Tsipras
- Succeeded by: Stavros Arachovitis

Alternate Minister of Agricultural Development and Food
- In office 27 January 2015 – 28 August 2015
- Prime Minister: Alexis Tsipras
- Preceded by: Giorgos Karasmanis as Minister of Rural Development and Food

Personal details
- Born: 28 May 1949 (age 77) Pappades, near Agia Anna, Euboea, Greece
- Party: Coalition of the Radical Left (Syriza)
- Education: Aristotle University of Thessaloniki

Evangelos Apostolou (Greek: Βαγγέλης Αποστόλου; born 28 May 1949 on the island of Euboea) is a Greek Syriza politician who served as the Minister of Agricultural Development and Food in the Second Cabinet of Alexis Tsipras from September 2015 to August 2018. From January to August 2015, he served as the Alternate Minister of Agricultural Development and Food in the First Cabinet of Alexis Tsipras.

== Early life and education ==
Born 1949 in Pappades, near Agia Anna, Euboea, Apostolou studied forestry at Aristotle University of Thessaloniki.

== Political career ==
As a member of Synaspismos, Apostolou has been a Member of the Hellenic Parliament for Euboea in the 1996–2000 period and served as a member of Synaspismos' Political Secretariat from 2004 until 2010.

Following his party into the Coalition of the Radical Left (SYRIZA), he was elected again in the May 2012 and June 2012 elections and named Syriza's shadow minister of rural development in July 2012. After the January 2015 legislative election, Apostolou was appointed Deputy Minister of Agricultural Development and Food.
