= Bassendean (disambiguation) =

Bassendean is a suburb in Perth, Western Australia.

Bassendean may also refer to:

- Town of Bassendean, local government area in Western Australia
- Electoral district of Bassendean, Western Australia
- Bassendean, Scottish Borders, medieval village and former country house in Scotland
