= Sir John Pringle, 1st Baronet =

Scottish physician (1707–1782)

Sir John Pringle Bt FRS
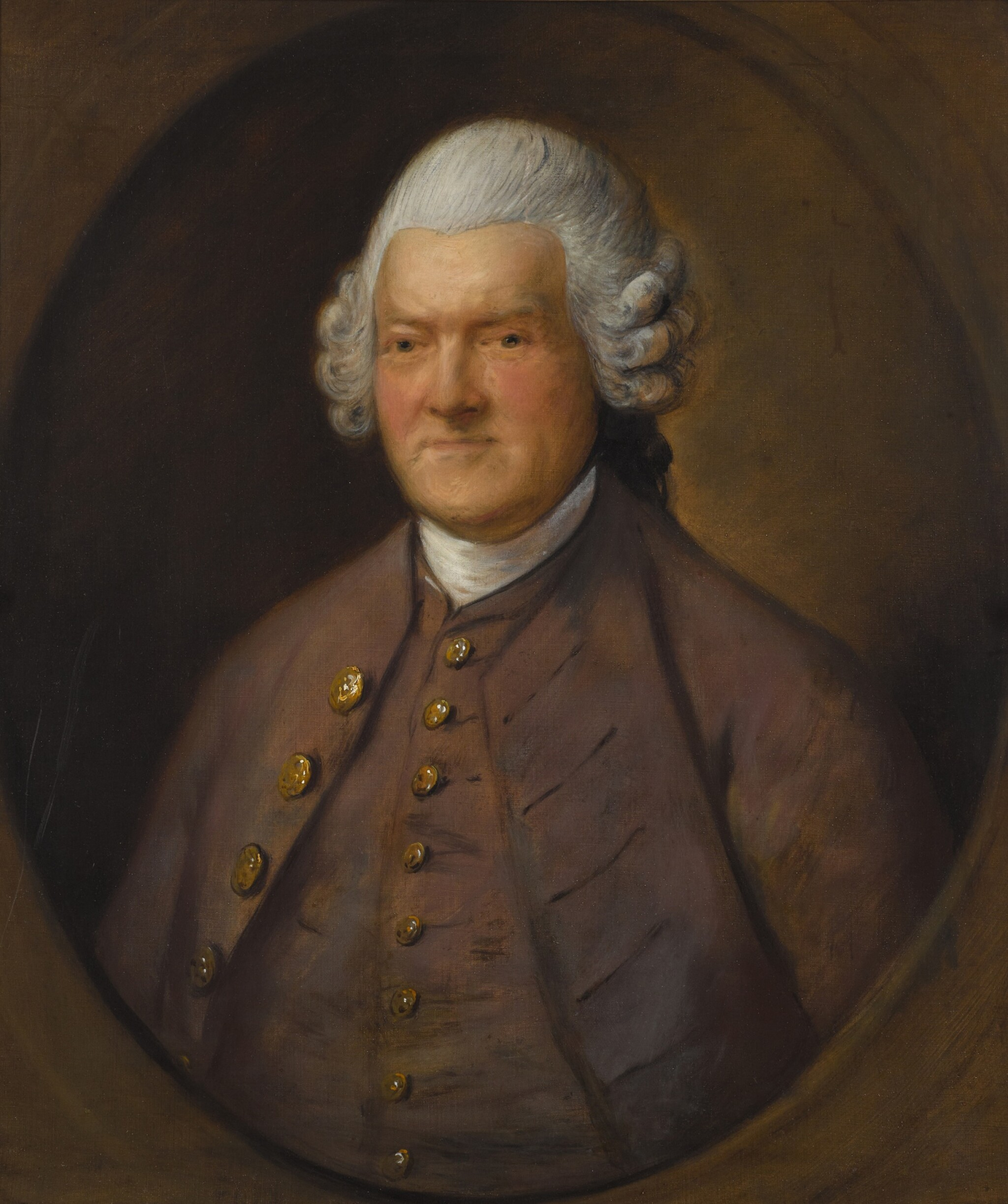
- Portrait by Thomas Gainsborough, 1778
- Born: 10 April 1707; Stitchel, Roxburgh, Scotland
- Died: 18 January 1782 (aged 74); London, England
- Education: University of St Andrews; University of Edinburgh
- Known for: Antiseptics
- Awards: Copley Medal (1752)
- Scientific career
- Fields: Physician
- Workplaces: University of Edinburgh

20th President of the Royal Society
- In office 1772–1778
- Preceded by: James Burrow
- Succeeded by: Joseph Banks

Sir John Pringle, 1st Baronet, FRS (10 April 1707 – 18 January 1782) was a Scottish physician who has been described as the "father of military medicine" alongside Ambroise Paré and Jonathan Letterman.

Arms of Sir John Pringle of London: Azure three escallops argent, a mullet of the last in the fess point for difference.

== Biography ==
=== Youth and early career ===
John Pringle was the youngest son of Sir John Pringle, 2nd Baronet, of Stichill, Roxburghshire (1662–1721), by his spouse Magdalen (d. December 1739), daughter of Sir Gilbert Eliott, 3rd Baronet, of Stobs.

He was educated at St Andrews, at Edinburgh, and at Leiden. In 1730 he graduated with a degree of Doctor of Physic at the last-named university, where he was an intimate friend of Gerard van Swieten and Albrecht von Haller.

He settled in Edinburgh at first as a physician, but between 1733 and 1744 was also Professor of Moral Philosophy at Edinburgh University.

In 1742 he became physician to the Earl of Stair, then commanding the British army in Flanders. About the time of the battle of Dettingen in Bavaria in June 1743, when the British army was encamped at Aschaffenburg, Pringle, through the Earl of Stair, brought about an agreement with the Marshal of Noailles, the French commander, that military hospitals on both sides be considered as neutral, immune sanctuaries for the sick and wounded, and should be mutually protected. The International Red Cross, as constituted by the modern Geneva Conventions, developed from this conception and agreement.

In 1744 he was appointed by the Duke of Cumberland physician-general to the forces in the Low Countries. In 1749, having settled in a smart house in Pall Mall, London, he was made physician in ordinary to the Duke of Cumberland.

On 1 April 1752 he married Charlotte (d. Dec 1753) second daughter of Dr William Oliver (1695–1764) of Bath, the inventor of Bath Oliver biscuits, but they had no issue.

In 1760, he wrote an appreciation of the Life of General James Wolfe.

On 5 June 1766 John Pringle was created a baronet, and in 1774 he was appointed Physician to His Majesty King George III.

He was also a frequent travelling companion to Benjamin Franklin. The successful London bookseller Andrew Millar noted Pringle and Franklin as dinner guests at his home.

=== Academia ===
His first book, Observations on the Nature and Cure of Hospital and Jayl Fevers, was published in 1750, and in the same year he contributed to the Philosophical Transactions of the Royal Society three papers on Experiments on Septic and Antiseptic Substances, which gained him the Copley Medal. Two years later he published his important work, Observations on the Diseases of the Army in Camp and Garrison, which entitles him to be regarded as the founder of modern military medicine.

In November 1772 he was elected President of the Royal Society, a position he held until 1778. In this capacity he delivered six discourses, which were afterwards collected into a single volume (1783).

In 1735, Pringle became a Fellow of the Royal College of Physicians of Edinburgh.

Pringle was a regular correspondent and friend of James Burnett, Lord Monboddo, the Scottish philosopher. Monboddo was an important thinker in pre-evolutionary theory, and some scholars actually credit him with the concept of evolution; however, Monboddo was also quite eccentric, which was one reason for Monboddo's not receiving credit for the evolution concepts. It was in a letter to Pringle in 1773 that Monboddo revealed he did not really hold to a belief of men being born with tails, which was the chief point of his ridicule.

At the age of 73 he went, briefly, to Edinburgh in 1780, but returned to London in September 1781, and died in the following year.

== Legacy ==
There is a monument to Pringle in Westminster Abbey, executed by Joseph Nollekens. At his death, his baronetcy became extinct.

After a legal case in 2004, the Royal College of Physicians of Edinburgh was able to open to the public the Pringle papers that it holds.

== See also ==
- Clan Pringle
- Pringle baronets

== See also ==
- List of presidents of the Royal Society

Baronetage of Great Britain
New title	Baronet (of Pall Mall); 1766–1782	Extinct
Preceded by Moore baronets	Pringle baronets of Pall Mall; 5 June 1766	Succeeded by East baronets
Professional and academic associations
Preceded by James Burrow	20th President of the Royal Society; 1772–1778	Succeeded by Joseph Banks
