= Old Gala House =

Museum in Scottish Borders, Scotland

Coordinates: 55.6139°N 2.8089°W

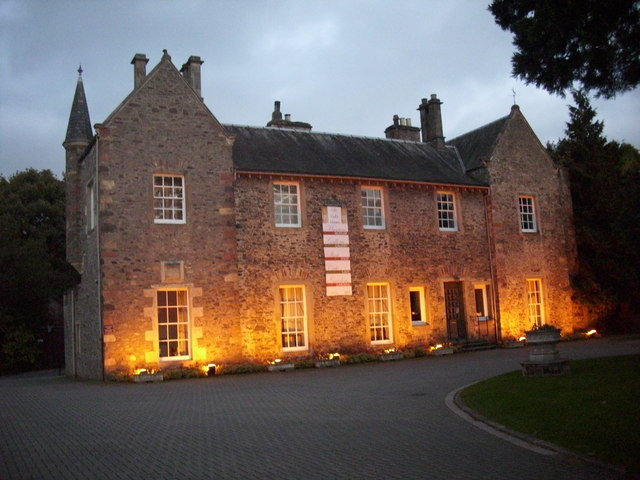
Old Gala house by night

Old Gala House is a museum and conference centre situated in the Old Town area of Galashiels in the Scottish Borders. The building was originally built as a tower house in 1457 by the Hoppringill (Pringle) family, who had been granted the lands of Gala by the Earl of Douglas. In 1583, Andrew Hoppringill carried out much improvement and extended the house as his family home. Further expansion took place in 1611, before Andrew returned to live at the family seat of Smailholm Tower in 1635, when his daughter, Jean, married Hugh Scott. A ceiling painting was rediscovered in 1952 celebrating that marriage. Hugh Scott, the new laird, carried out more improvements and extended the house. Further extensions were carried out in the 17th and 18th centuries, completing the edifice we see today. The five bay, U-shaped house is built of rubblestone and is embraced on three sides by gardens complete with water features.

In 1872, Hugh Scott 9th of Gala commissioned Scottish architect David Bryce to design and build a new house. On completion the family moved to New Gala House, abandoning the old house. New Gala House was demolished in 1985 around the time the Scottish Borders Council renovated the old house and converted it to a venue. As well as being a museum and conference centre, the house plays a role in the graduation ceremonies of the local university and also caters for all forms of meetings including marriages. The house also holds the archives of Borders Family History Society.
