= Ben Jordan =

Ben Jordan may refer to:

- Ben Jordan (boxer) (1873–1945), English boxer who took the British World Featherweight Championship in 1899
- Ben Jordan: Paranormal Investigator, a video game for Microsoft Windows.

== See also ==
- B. Everett Jordan (Benjamin, 1896-1974), American businessman and politician, U.S. Senator from North Carolina
