= Pringle baronets =

Baronetcy in the Baronetage of Nova Scotia

Baronetcy of Pringle of Stichill
- Arms of the Pringles of Stichill: Azure, three escallops, or
- Creation date: 5 January 1683
- Created by: Charles II
- Peerage: Baronetage of Nova Scotia
- First holder: Sir Robert Pringle, 1st Baronet
- Present holder: Sir Murray Pringle, 10th Baronet
- Heir apparent: Alastair Steuart Ronald Pringle
- Remainder to: The male heirs of the first baronet's body
- Former seats: Stitchill House, Roxburghshire; Undermount, Bonchurch, Isle of Wight
- Motto: (Above crest) Coronat fides ("Faith crowns") (Below shield) Amicitia reddit honores ("Friendship gives honour")

There have been two baronetcies created for members of the Scottish Pringle family, one in the Baronetage of Nova Scotia and one in the Baronetage of Great Britain. As of 2026, one creation is extant.

The Pringle Baronetcy, of Stichill in the County of Roxburgh, was created in the Baronetage of Nova Scotia on 5 January 1683 for Robert Pringle. The fourth Baronet sat as Member of Parliament for Berwickshire.

Arms of Sir John Pringle of London: Azure three escallops argent, a mullet of the last in the fess point for difference

The Pringle Baronetcy, of Pall Mall, was created in the Baronetage of Great Britain on 5 June 1766 for the physician John Pringle. He was the youngest son of the second Baronet of the 1673 creation. The title became extinct on his death in 1782.

== Pringle baronets, of Stichill (1683) ==
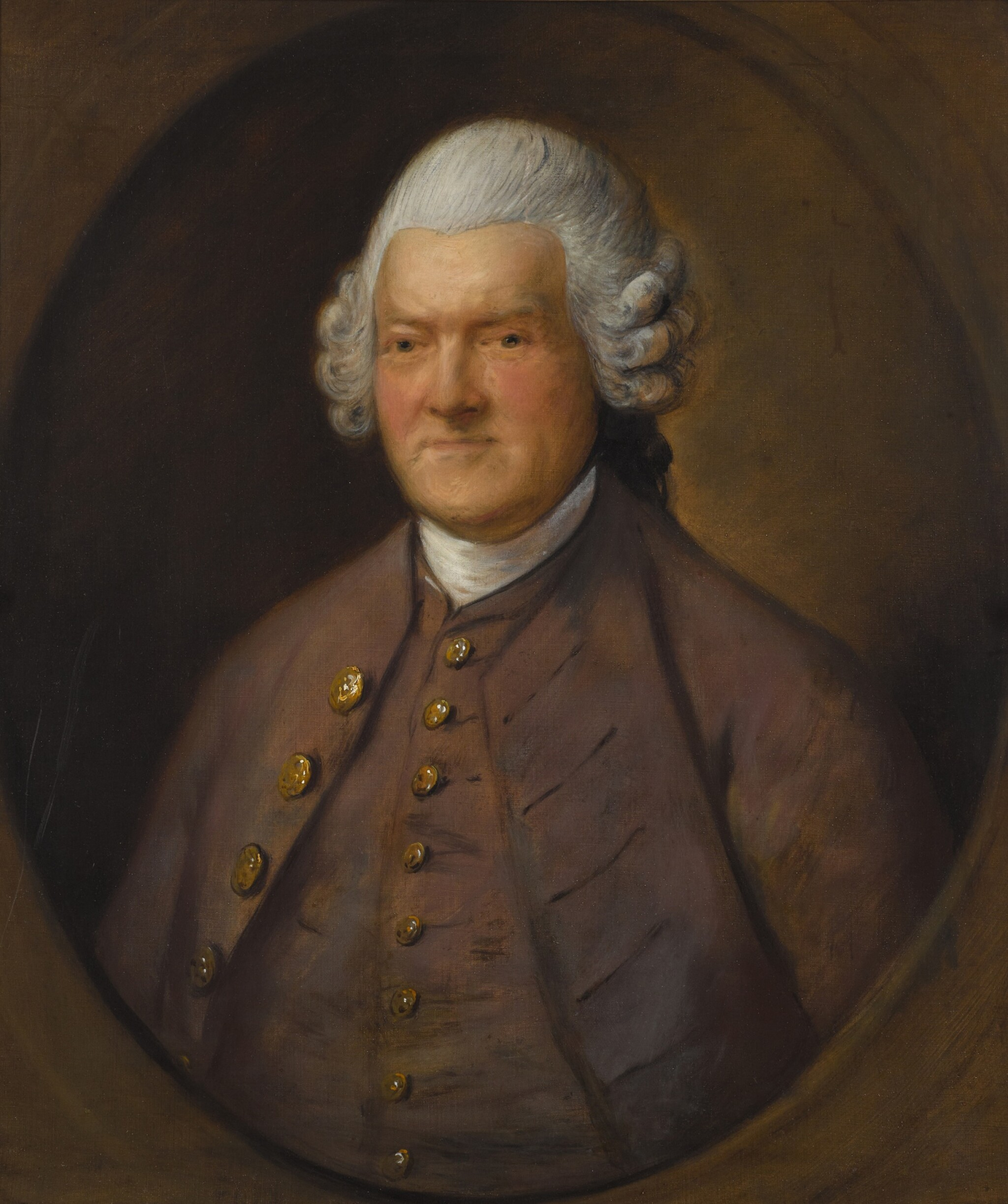
Sir John Pringle, 1st Baronet of Pringle of Pall Mall

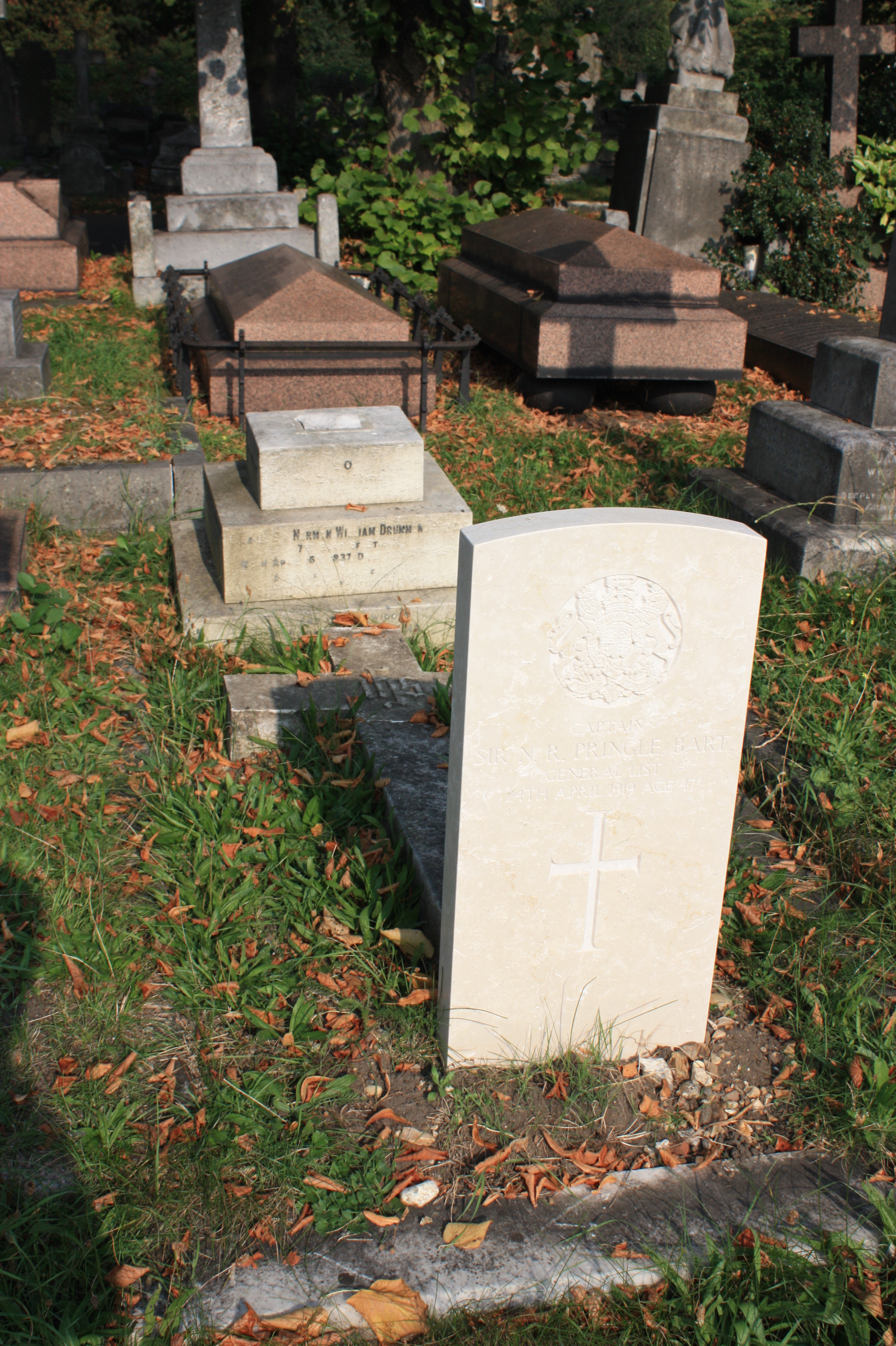
The grave of Sir Norman William Pringle and his son Sir Norman Robert Pringle, Brompton Cemetery, London

- Sir Robert Pringle, 1st Baronet (died c. 1700)
- Sir John James Pringle, 2nd Baronet (1662–1721)
- Sir Robert Pringle, 3rd Baronet (1690–1779)
- Sir James Pringle, 4th Baronet (1726–1809)
- Sir John Pringle, 5th Baronet (1784–1869)
- Sir Norman Pringle, 6th Baronet (1787–1870)
- Sir Norman William Drummond Pringle, 7th Baronet (1836–1897)
- Sir Norman Robert Pringle, 8th Baronet (1871–1919)
- Squadron Leader Norman Hamilton Pringle, de facto 9th Baronet (1903–1961), putative and legal son of 8th Baronet, recognised during his lifetime but removed from the Official Roll of the Baronetage in 2016 following DNA evidence that he was not the biological son of the 8th Baronet.
- Lt-Gen Sir Steuart Robert Pringle, de facto 10th Baronet KCB (1928–2013), son of the de facto 9th Baronet, recognised during his lifetime but removed from the Official Roll of the Baronetage in 2016 following DNA evidence that his father was not the biological son of the 8th Baronet.
- Sir Ronald Steuart Pringle, de jure 9th Baronet (1905–1968), eldest biological son of 8th Baronet, not recognised during his lifetime but added posthumously to the Official Roll of the Baronetage in 2016.
- Sir Norman Murray Archibald MacGregor Pringle, 10th Baronet (b. 1941), son of the de jure 9th Baronet.

The heir apparent to the Baronetcy is the present holder's only son, Alastair Steuart Ronald Pringle (b. 1972).

=== 2013–2016 dispute over lineage ===
After the 2013 death of Steuart Pringle, the 10th de facto Baronet, the title was claimed by his eldest son, Simon. DNA testing, however, originally gathered by Murray Pringle (the current 10th Baronet) with the stated aim of determining the current clan chief of the Clan Pringle (dormant since 1738), showed that Steuart Pringle was not genetically related to the rest of the Pringle clan. Murray Pringle then contested the title and claimed it for himself, on the basis that the 9th baronet should have been recognised as his father, Ronald Steuart Pringle (9th de jure baronet), the younger, legitimate son of the 8th baronet. While the dispute continued, the baronetcy was dormant, due to the conflicting claims of Murray Pringle and Simon Pringle, since neither had proven their right of succession to the baronetcy over the other. As a consequence neither was entered on the Official Roll of the Baronetage.

The Queen, acting under the Judicial Committee Act 1833, referred the matter to the Judicial Committee of the Privy Council, which held its hearings on the matter in November 2015 and January 2016. It delivered its ruling on 20 June 2016, determining that DNA evidence proved that Sir Norman Hamilton Pringle, 9th de facto Baronet, was conceived by an unknown father and was not the biological son of Sir Norman Robert Pringle, 8th Baronet.

In delivering the judgment, Lord Hodge stated that his court had no reason to reject DNA evidence considered valid in other cases, and that it was not the place of the court to consider social ramifications of rulings over legitimacy:

85. In the past, the absence of scientific evidence meant that the presumption of legitimacy could rarely be rebutted and claims based on assertions that irregular procreations had occurred in the distant past were particularly difficult to establish. Not so now. It is not for the Board to express any view on what social policy should be. It notes the ability of DNA evidence to reopen a family succession many generations into the past. Whether this is a good thing and whether legal measures are needed to protect property transactions in the past, the rights of the perceived beneficiary of a trust of property, and the long established expectations of a family, are questions for others to consider.

On 27 June 2016, Grant Bavister, Assistant Register to the Baronetage at the Ministry of Justice, entered Sir Ronald Steuart Pringle and his son Sir Murray Pringle onto the Official Roll of the Baronetage, as the 9th and 10th de jure Baronets. He also removed the de facto 9th and 10th Baronets, Norman Hamilton Pringle and his son Steuart Robert Pringle, from the Roll, in accordance with the Royal Warrant of 1910. Certificates of succession to this effect were issued to Sir Murray Pringle on 1 July 2016.

== Pringle baronets, of Pall Mall (1766) ==
- Sir John Pringle, 1st Baronet (1707–1782)

== See also ==
- Clan Pringle
