= Nenthorn =

Coordinates: 55.6286°N 2.5095°W

- Location within the Scottish Borders
- OS grid reference: NT6802037343
- Council area: Scottish Borders
- Lieutenancy area: Roxburgh, Ettrick and Lauderdale
- Country: Scotland
- Sovereign state: United Kingdom
- Post town: Kelso
- Postcode district: TD5
- Dialling code: 01573
- Police: Scotland
- Fire: Scottish
- Ambulance: Scottish
- UK Parliament: Berwickshire, Roxburgh and Selkirk
- Scottish Parliament: Ettrick, Roxburgh and Berwickshire

Nenthorn is a parish and hamlet in the south of the historic county of Berwickshire in the Scottish Borders area of Scotland. It is included in the Floors, Makerstoun, Nenthorn and Smailholm Community Council area, which also includes the parishes of Makerstoun and Smailholm. It was included in the former Roxburgh District of Borders Region, by the Local Government (Scotland) Act 1973, from 1975 to 1996.

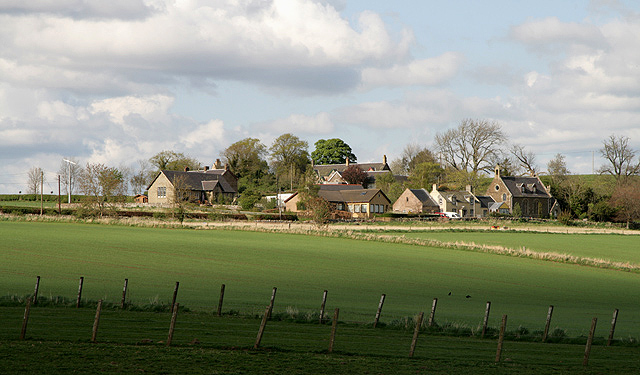
Village of Nenthorn (church on right)

The parish is bounded by the Berwickshire parishes of Earlston to the west and Hume to the north; then by the Roxburghshire parishes of Stichill and Ednam to the east, Kelso on the south; and Smailholm on the west. Its length from east to west is 4.5 miles (7.2 km), while its breadth varies between 0.25 miles (0.40 km) and 2 miles (3.2 km), there being a narrow neck of land where the Nenthorn portion of the parish in the west joins the Newton portion in the east.

The Eden Water, which flows in from the north, runs 1.75 miles (2.82 km) along the western boundary, sharply bends and runs 2.25 miles (3.62 km) along the southern boundary, crosses the parish at its narrow neck in the middle, then runs 1.5 miles (2.4 km) along the northern boundary, then runs 0.5 miles (0.80 km) inside the parish before flowing into Ednam parish. Ednam (formerly Edenham), which is named after this river, originally included Nenthorn and thus old Edenham parish traversed the Eden valley from Mellerstain to the river's exit into the Tweed.

Anciently called Naithansthirn, the name of the parish appears to be a joining of the name Naithan with a physical object, probably some rocks in the parish called thirn. This name may be the same as that occurring in Cambusnethan, Lanarkshire. In 1105 the chapels of Nathansthirn and Newton were recorded as being within Ednam parish, while the area was in the possession of the De Morevilles of Lauderdale. During that period the manors of Nathansthirn and Newton were formed, following which the parish of Nathansthirn appears to have been created during the 13th century composed of these two manors. The chapel of Nathansthirn was then upgraded to become a parish church, while that of Newton continued as a chapel.

Nenthorn House, the seat of the laird of Nenthorn, was built from 1862, as a replacing an older mansion. It is a three-storey building in Jacoobean style, whose architect is reputed to be Thomas Leadbetter of Edinburgh.

Newton Don, the seat of the laird of the eastern part of the parish, namely Newton, is a three-storey house neoclassical mansion designed by Robert Adam, dating from 18th century, considerably altered 1815–1820. It overlooks Eden Water and, its surroundings were landscaped in the early 19th century with large areas of lawn, and planned woodland.

Nenthorn (1845)

Nenthorn Church was erected in 1802, replacing an older church near Nenthorn House. south-west of the village. It is in Gothic style including elements characteristic of medieval churches, with a belfry on the western side. The lairds of Nenthorn and Newton Don (the two estates which made up the parish) each had an upstairs gallery themselves. After 1945, the parish of Nenthorn was united for church purposes with the parishes of Stichill and Hume, which had themselves been united since 1605. Hume church was closed in 1640 and now, since 1974 Nenthorn church has also closed. Stichill church is still operational. Nethorn church was converted to a private residence and sold in 1980–81.Meanwhile, Makerstoun and Smailholm parishes were linked with Stichill-Hume-Nenthorn in 1975, with Roxburgh parish joining in 2001. As it was impracticable to continue using the names of all six parishes in every official reference to the united parish, the name Kelso Country Churches was adopted for the ecclesiastical parish in 2006.

A Parochial Board was established under the Poor Law (Scotland) Act 1845. With the Local Government (Scotland) Act 1894 the Parish Council was established. Civil parishes in Scotland, as units of local government, were abolished in 1929 but have been used later for census and other purposes.

The civil parish has an area of 3,443 acres (1,393 ha) and a population of 168 (in 2011).
