= Steuart Pringle =

British general and baronet (1928–2013)

Lieutenant-General Sir Steuart Pringle KCB
- Born: Steuart Robert Pringle; 21 July 1928; Dover, Kent, England
- Died: 18 April 2013 (aged 84); London, England
- Education: Sherborne School
- Military career
- Allegiance: United Kingdom
- Branch: Royal Marines
- Service years: 1946–84
- Rank: Lieutenant-General
- Commands: Commandant General Royal Marines; 45 Commando
- Conflicts: Malayan Emergency; Suez Crisis; Cyprus Emergency; Indonesia–Malaysia confrontation Operation Banner
- Awards: Knight Commander of the Order of the Bath

Lieutenant-General Sir Steuart Robert Pringle KCB (21 July 1928 – 18 April 2013) was a Scottish Royal Marines officer who served as Commandant General Royal Marines from 1981 to 1985. He was seriously injured by an IRA car bomb in 1981, in which he lost his right leg.

He was styled as the 10th Baronet of Stichill from 1961 to 2016, when a court accepted DNA evidence that established he was not the biological grandson of the 8th baronet. His cousin Murray Pringle inherited the baronetcy instead of Sir Steuart's eldest son and expected heir.

== Early life and education ==
Pringle was born in Dover on 21 July 1928, the only child of Sir Norman Hamilton Pringle of Stichill, 9th Baronet (1903–1961), and his first wife, Winifred Olive Curran (died 1975). He was educated at Sherborne School.

== Military career ==
Pringle joined the Royal Marines in 1946. He was appointed commanding officer of 45 Commando in 1971 and had a tour at Headquarters Commando Forces from 1974 in which role he was promoted from lieutenant colonel to colonel. Promoted to major-general on 1 February 1978 (local major-general from 20 February 1978), he then became Major General Commando Forces.

Pringle went on to be chief of staff to the Commandant General Royal Marines in 1979 and Commandant General Royal Marines in 1981. On 17 October 1981, he was injured by an IRA car bomb attached to his red Volkswagen car outside his home in Dulwich, South London as he went to take his pet black Labrador, Bella, to the park for a run. One of the first questions he asked was, "How's my dog?". Bella was unscathed but Pringle lost his right leg in the incident and badly injured his left.

As Commandant General of the Royal Marines, he was seen welcoming the Commandos home following the Falklands War. He was named BBC Pebble Mill Man of the Year for his "outstanding achievement and bravery". He later returned to duties, and retired in June 1984.

== Later life ==
In retirement he became chairman and Chief Executive of the Chatham Historic Dockyard Trust. He died in London on 18 April 2013.

== Honours ==
Pringle was appointed a Knight Commander of the Order of the Bath (KCB) in the 1982 Birthday Honours.

He was awarded an Honorary DSc of City University London in 1982 and an Honorary LLD of Exeter University in 1994. He was also an Honorary Admiral of the Texas Navy.

== Personal life ==
In 1953, Sir Steuart married Jacqueline Marie Gladwell, only daughter of Wilfrid Hubert Gladwell. They had two sons and two daughters. His eldest son, Simon, had been the heir apparent to the baronetcy.

=== DNA case ===
Norman Hamilton Pringle and his son Sir Steuart were recognised as the 9th and 10th Pringle Baronets of Nova Scotia, respectively, during their lifetimes; however, questions had been raised in the family as to whether Norman was the biological child of Sir Norman Robert Pringle, 8th Baronet (1871–1919). The 8th Baronet had married Florence Madge Vaughan on 16 October 1902 but she gave birth to Norman only seven months later, on 13 May 1903, leading to questions of legitimacy that were not resolved until more than a century later.

In 2009, Sir Steuart agreed to DNA testing for a project launched by his first cousin Murray Pringle (born 1941), an accountant who was attempting to restore a clan chief to Clan Pringle, which has been an armigerous clan since 1737. The results indicated that Sir Steuart's paternal DNA was not consistent with that of other Pringles, but Murray heeded advice that the issue of the legitimate claimant to the baronetcy should not be contested during Sir Steuart's lifetime. After he died in 2013, both Simon (Sir Steuart's eldest son) and Murray attempted to claim the baronetcy. In 2016, a court agreed Murray Pringle was the rightful heir to the baronetcy instead of his first cousin once removed Simon, as DNA evidence demonstrated that Sir Steuart's father was not the biological son of Sir Norman Pringle, 8th Baronet. There were two younger sons – Ronald Steuart (1905–1968; Murray Pringle's father), and James Drummond (1906–1960). Norman Hamilton was proven with a "high degree of probability" to be fathered by someone outside the Pringle clan, and Sir Steuart and his father were removed posthumously from the Official Roll of the Baronetage. Murray Pringle was declared the 10th Baronet and his father the de jure 9th Baronet. However, as a Knight Commander of the Order of the Bath, Sir Steuart was still styled as Sir.

Military offices
Preceded by Sir John Richards	Commandant General Royal Marines; 1981–1985	Succeeded by Sir Michael Wilkins
Baronetage of Nova Scotia
Preceded by Sir Norman Pringle, de facto 9th Baronet	Baronet (of Stichill); 1961–2013	Succeeded by Sir Murray Pringle, 10th Baronet
