= Peter Broun =

Australian politician

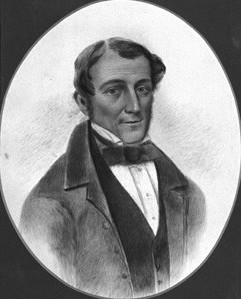
- Born: Peter Nicholas Broun; 17 August 1797; Guernsey, Channel Islands
- Died: 5 November 1846 (aged 49); Fremantle, Western Australia
- Other names: Peter Nicholas Brown

Peter Nicholas Broun (17 August 1797 – 5 November 1846), known for most of his life as Peter Nicholas Brown, was the first Colonial Secretary of Western Australia, and a member of Western Australia's first Legislative Council.

== Early life ==
Peter Broun was born in Guernsey on 17 August 1797, son of William Broun, who was the brother of Sir James Broun, the 7th baronet of Colstoun and Thornydykes, and Nancy Mainguy. Peter Broun was descended from Sir George Broun, the 3rd baronet, who lived in two of the family estates, Thornydyke Castle and Bassendean, in Berwickshire.

Broun spent his early life in Scotland as a gentleman clerk. In 1825 he married Caroline Simpson. They were to have three sons and five daughters.

== Colonial Secretary ==
On 30 September 1828, Lieutenant-Governor James Stirling made a number of appointments to important public service positions for the planned colony of Western Australia, including appointing Peter Broun to the position of Colonial Secretary at a salary of £400. Broun's appointment was on the recommendation of Sir George Murray, Secretary of State for War and the Colonies, who was a close family friend of the Brouns.

Broun sailed for the new colony with his wife and two children on board the Parmelia, arriving in June 1829. Initially he worked out of a group of tents on Garden Island, before transferring to a temporary building on the new site of Perth, constructed by Broun with the intention of being his home. In 1832, the Colonial Secretary's office moved to more permanent quarters on the corner of Hay and Irwin Streets.

Broun had brought livestock, equipment and furniture valued at more than £500, which entitled him to a grant of 9,626 acres (38.96 km^{2}), which he took up in Upper Swan and West Guildford. The latter estate, which he named Bassendean after the Berwickshire ancestral family estate, is now the suburb of Bassendean. The neighbouring suburb, Eden Hill, was named after Eden Water, the river flowing through Bassendean, Berwickshire.

In 1830, a legislative council was formed to help the governor to rule the colony, with the first sitting in 1832. As colonial secretary, Broun was automatically appointed to the council. The council met four times a month, and during Stirling's absence, from August 1832 to August 1834, Broun was particularly busy. He remained a member until his death.

In addition to his duties as colonial secretary and clerk of the legislative council, he was also registrar for the colony and second in importance to the governor.

== Broun the banker ==
As colonial secretary, Broun was initially responsible for managing much of the government's funds, and after an initial proposal to set up a government-backed colonial bank failed to materialise, when settlers needed to lodge their funds for safekeeping they naturally turned to him. Broun was entirely untrained in matters of finance and accounting, and the large distances over which the colony was spread meant that cheques were often held for long periods of time. Payments to shipping companies by settlers for imports meant that hard currency became scarce and in January 1834 the government issued a limited number of £1 notes. This had the effect of raising suspicion against Broun's own promissory notes and by 1835, his makeshift bank had effectively collapsed, and government funds had to be used to settle the matter. To repay the government, Broun sold out his entire estate at Bassendean, and assigned one quarter of his income to the government until the debt was repaid.

Not all settlers were prepared to accept that Broun's failure as a banker was entirely innocent, for on 12 January 1836 he was verbally assaulted in the street by a settler named Will Shaw, who had previously been involved in a protracted dispute with Broun over the boundary between their grants. Shaw was fined for the assault, but went on to slander Broun throughout the town. Broun then brought a slander case against Shaw, which he won easily. The court case won Broun much public goodwill, for it showed that he had only agreed to act as banker for the good of the public, and that as soon as he had had to suspend payments he had sold his own estate to settle the debts.

== Death ==
Broun first became ill in July 1846. After a brief recovery, he relapsed in August. He eventually died in Fremantle on 5 November 1846, and was buried in East Perth Cemetery. He was survived by his wife and a number of sons. A grandson, Frank Broun, later became Member for Beverley in the Western Australian Legislative Assembly, and, like his grandfather, Colonial Secretary of Western Australia.

His wife sailed for England in the Hindoo which caught fire at sea and was destroyed. She was saved but Broun's diaries and papers which she had intended to have published in London were destroyed.

== Brown or Broun ==
For most of his life, Broun spelled his surname Brown, despite the fact that the family name had been spelled Broun for most of the family's history. James Battye claims (Note: This claim of Battye is repeated in Bryan and Bray (1935), but no reference is given.) that the entire family had changed the spelling of their surname to Brown in an attempt to avoid the consequences of an involvement in the Jacobite rising of 1745. The entire family, including Peter Broun, changed back to Broun in 1843. Although Broun lived for only a further three years, most current sources adopt the Broun spelling.
