= Houndslow =

Village in Scottish Borders, Scotland

Coordinates: 55.719°N 2.583°W

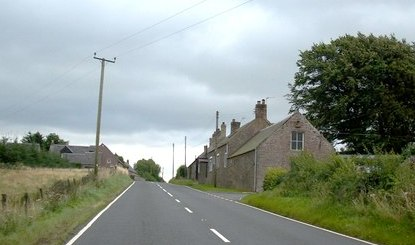
Houndslow

Houndslow is a hamlet in the Scottish Borders area of Scotland. It is situated on the A697, about 5 miles (8.0 km) west of Greenlaw, and 3 miles (4.8 km) north-east of Gordon. Immediately to the south is the former village of Bassendean, with the 17th-century Bassendean House.

== See also ==
- List of places in the Scottish Borders
