= Clan Pringle =

Lowland Scottish clan

- Crest: An escalop or
- Motto: Amicitia Reddit Honores (Friendship Gives Honour)

Profile
- Region: Scottish Borders

Chief
- Sir Norman Murray Archibald MacGregor Pringle of that Ilk and Stichill, 10th Baronet
- Chief of the Name and Arms of the Honourable Clan Pringle.
- Historic seat: Torsonce; Hoppringle
Septs of Clan Pringle
Prindle
Rival clans
Elliot, Armstrong

Clan Pringle is a Lowland clan from the Scottish Borders.

== Origin of the name ==
According to the detailed book 'The Records of the Pringles', the surname Hoppringill, or Pringle, dates from the reign of Alexander III of Scotland (1249–86) and is one of the oldest names of the Scottish Border region.

Pringle is a placename derived from a locale in the Parish of Stow on the right side of Gala Water, about ten miles North of Galashiels. Hoppringle lies about one half mile up from the bank of the river on the Southern slopes of a ridge separating the valleys of the rivers Armet and Todhole (now named Armet Water and Toddle Burn).

This ridge, with its level crest, abuts at its Western extremity on the Gala in a remarkably rounded knob some 300 ft above the level of the river, which winds around its base in a semi-circle. It is this ring-like boss which no doubt gives the place its name of Hoppringhill, as it is occasionally written in older records.

The first syllable is the name Hope, Hopp, Op or Up, derived from the Old English Hop - a haven, denoting a small enclosed valley branching off a larger one. The other syllables include ring (or rink ), and hill. As such names are always descriptive, Hoppringill means simply the small enclosed valley of the ring, or round hill.

The full name of Hoppringill was in use for 300 years. The last recorded usage in its full form is by a Chief of the Clan whose will, dated 1737, is in the name of John Hoppringle of that Ilk. Around 1590, however, Pringill, which had appeared rarely before, begins to become the dominant form, until around 1650, when it gave way to Pringle. This change closely follows similar changes in the spelling of words like Temple and Single, derived from Tempill and Singill. The final syllable was never actually pronounced gill.

== History ==
In the 14th century the family were close allies of the Earls of Douglas, to whom they were squires, and about the end of that era they are first defined as Hoppringle of that Ilk, holding the lands of Earlside in Lauderdale. Descendants were much in evidence at the Courts of James IV and V, at least two being trumpeters in the tail of James IV and one falling at his side at Flodden in 1513. For 100 years, from about 1489, a succession of Pringle ladies, usually younger daughters, were Prioresses of the Convent at Coldstream. The association of Pringles with the woollen industry may be traced to 1540 when one of their name held the responsibility for overseeing the shearing, storage and transportation of the wool from the King's sheep. In 1592 various Pringles appeared before the King, with other Border lairds, giving an oath to faithfully serve the Wardens of the East and Middle Marches, and evidence of their extended land-holdings is shown by no less than six cadet families standing surety, one for the other, in keeping the peace. Five years later, Pringle of that Ilk and Pringle of Smailholm subscribed to a Bond of Manrent, taking it upon themselves the burden of ensuring the good behavior of Pringles in general. The last Pringle of that Ilk died in 1737, after which the principal family became the Pringles of Stitchill, the lands of which were acquired c.1630. Of this latter house, Sir Robert was created a Baronet of Nova Scotia in 1683 and, although the lands have now been sold, the Baronetcy has survived into the 21st century.

== Castles and Tower Houses ==
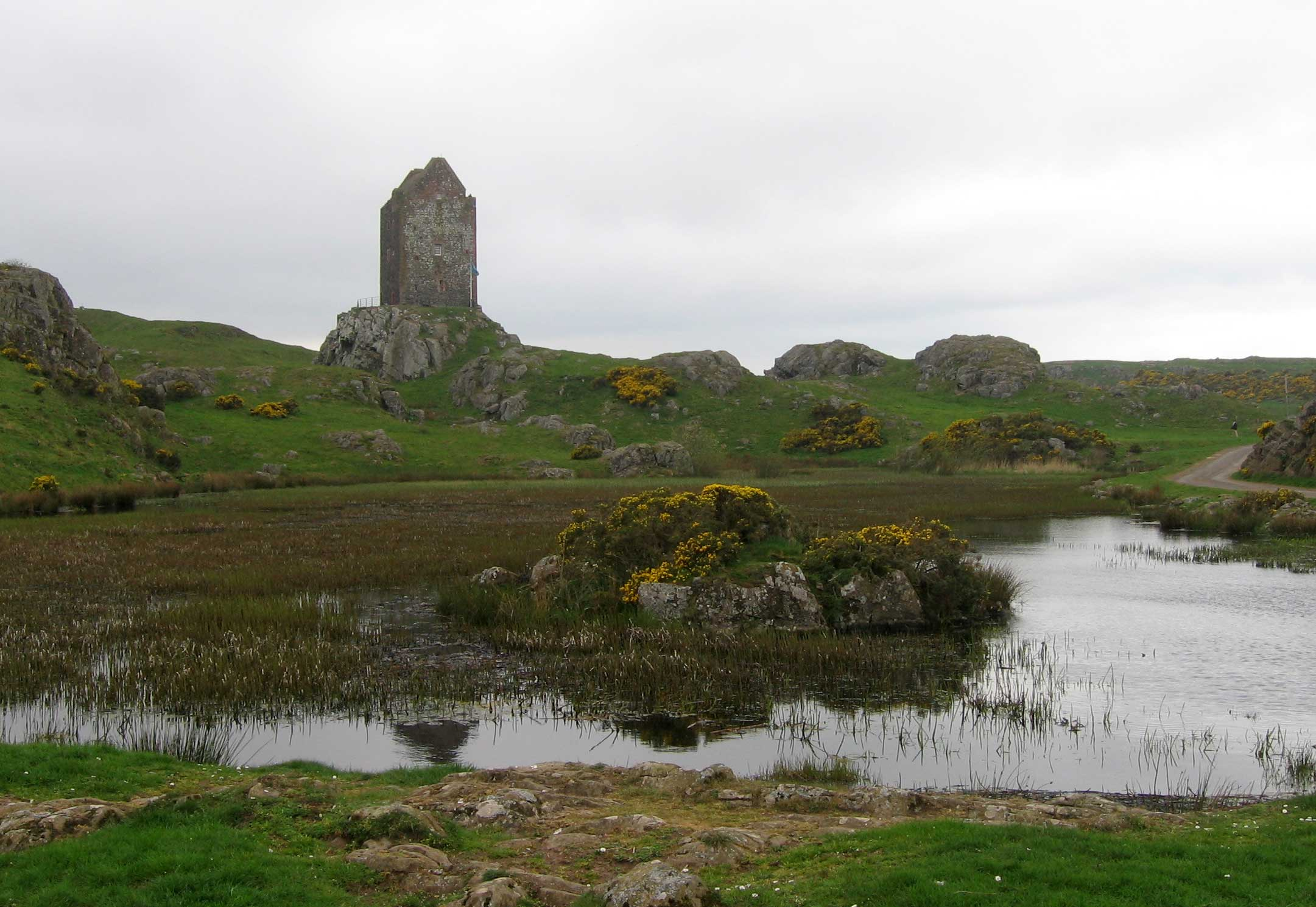
Smailholm Tower in the Scottish Borders

The original seat of the Chief of Clan Pringle was at Hoppringle and later at Torsonce on the Gala Water in Scotland.

The Pringles also built: Smailholm Tower, Buckholm Tower, Torwoodlee Tower and House, Old Gala House, Whytbank Tower, Yair House, Stichill House and the Haining House in Selkirk.

The Pringles also owned at various times: Greenknowe Tower and Craigcrook Castle.

== Clan Chief ==
- Clan chief: Sir Norman Murray Archibald MacGregor Pringle of that Ilk and Stichill, 10th Baronet

The Hoppringles of that ilk, afterwards the Pringles of Torsonce, on Gala Water, were the Chiefs of the clan and the senior branch of the family. The last Clan Chief was John Hoppringle of that Ilk and Torsonce, who died on 21 December 1737. His only daughter, Margaret, married Gilbert Pringle, 2nd son of the 2nd Baronet of Stitchill, carried the estates and arms into that branch of the family. In February 2020, the Lord Lyon King of Arms recognised Sir Murray Pringle of Stichill's entitlement to the chiefship.

== Pringle Baronets of Stitchill ==
There have been two Baronetcies created for members of the Scottish Pringle family. One for the Pringles of Stichill, in the Baronetage of Nova Scotia created in 1683, the current holder of which is Sir Murray Pringle, 10th Baronet. The second was created for Dr Sir John Pringle of Pall Mall, in the Baronetage of Great Britain in 1766, though it is now extinct.

== Pringle Senators of the College of Justice ==
Several Pringles have become Senators of the College of Justice in Scotland, which comes with the title and rank of Lord of Session.

- On 6 June 1718 Sir Walter Pringle became Lord Newhall.
- On 1 July 1729 John Pringle of The Haining became Lord Haining.
- On 20 November 1754 Robert Pringle became Lord Edgefield.
- On 14 June 1757 Andrew Pringle became Lord Alemore.

== See also ==
- Pringle
- Smailholm Tower
- Smailholm, Scottish Borders
- Old Gala House. Home of the Lairds of Gala
- Moubray House. The Edinburgh home of the Pringles of Gala
- Andrew Pringle, Lord Alemoor. Solicitor General for Scotland and a Lord of Session.
- Lt General Sir Steuart Pringle KCB
- Dr Sir John Pringle, 1st Bart. President of the Royal Society and Physician to George III.
- Pringle Baronets
- Stichill
- Thomas Pringle The father of South African Poetry and an Abolitionist.
- Border Reivers
- Scottish clan
- Scottish clan chief
- List of Scottish clans
- Scottish crest badge
- List of crest badges used by Scottish clan members
- Scottish heraldry
