= Makerstoun =

Coordinates: 55.586°N 2.526°W

Makerstoun: Scots: Makerstoun
- Location within the Scottish Borders
- OS grid reference: NT670324
- Council area: Scottish Borders
- Lieutenancy area: Roxburgh, Ettrick and Lauderdale
- Country: Scotland
- Sovereign state: United Kingdom
- Post town: Kelso
- Postcode district: TD5 7
- Dialling code: 01573
- Police: Scotland
- Fire: Scottish
- Ambulance: Scottish
- UK Parliament: Berwickshire, Roxburgh and Selkirk
- Scottish Parliament: Ettrick, Roxburgh and Berwickshire

Makerstoun is a parish in the Scottish Borders area of Scotland, as well as the historic county of Roxburghshire, 4 miles (6 km) south-west of Kelso.

The parish is bordered to the south by the river Tweed. It is bounded on the west by the parish of Mertoun in Berwickshire, on the north by the parish of Smailholm, on the east by the parish of Kelso and on the south by the parish of Roxburgh, across the River Tweed.

The name of the parish reputedly means the town of Machar.

For many centuries most of the land in the parish has been owned by the proprietor of Makerstoun estate, thus in the 19th century most of the land belonged to Sir Thomas Makdougall Brisbane of Makerstoun House (former Governor of New South Wales).

Formerly, the greater part of the population was extremely fluctuating. All the families, except a few (nine in 1845), being the families either of farm servants or of tradesmen employed by the farmers, were liable to be removed every year. However, as the small farmers were dispensed with by the landlords, the population reduced from over 1,000 at the end of 18th century to 132 in 1981.

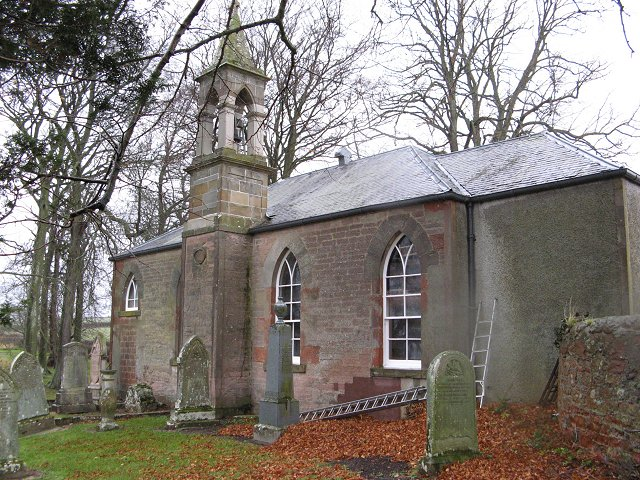
Makerstoun Kirk

The area of the parish is 2,865 acres (1,160 ha).

The original medieval church was sited in the grounds of Makerstoun House (thus in the south of the parish near the Tweed), where some remains still exist. The first recorded minister of the church dates from 1567. In 1807 it was decided by the Makerstoun estate that the church, and the manse with its offices and garden should be moved to a more central site in the parish. A new church was thus built in 1808, which stands to the present day.

The Community Council for Makerston is the Floors, Makerstoun, Nenthorn and Smailholm Community Council, which covers the parishes of Makerstoun and Smailholm in Roxburghshire, the parish of Nenthorn in Berwickshire and Floors Castle. It has 12 members, two of whom (as of 2015) were the Laird of Makerstoun and his wife.

== Barony of Makerstoun ==
The barony in later medieval Scotland was a very common franchise, increasingly defined as an estate to which specific ‘baronial’ powers attached. In general the barons had essentially the same criminal and civil jurisdiction within their barony as the sheriffs had within the sheriffdom. Commonly the baronies coincided with the parishes and were anyway roughly parish sized. Makerstoun, like 18 other baronies in Roxburghshire (Bedrule, Cavers, Ednam, Hownam, Linton, Longnewton, Maxton, Maxwell, Minto, Smailholm, Wilton, and Yetholm) corresponded exactly or closely with the eponymous parish. The earliest proprietor of the Barony of Makerstoun named in the records is Walter Corbet, who acquired the barony about the middle of the 12th century. About 1125, Walter Corbet, Laird of Makerstoun, built the village of Makerstoun and the church, St. Peter's. His father was Robert Corbet, who came from Shropshire in the beginning of the 12th century, and settled in Teviotdale under Earl David (later King David I of Scotland). A small fortified keep known as a pele tower was built at Makerstoun in 1128. The tower was extended in 1300.

In 1374 Robert II confirmed Fergus MacDowall as baron of Makerstoun, which he had inherited from the Corbet family via his mother Margaret. This was the first baron of the MacDowall, also known as MacDougall, family (various spellings used for both). About 1390, Archibald McDowell got a grant from Robert III of the lands of “M'Carstoune”, Yetholm, and Elistone (Clifton). The tower was rebuilt by Thomas Makdowell in 1590.

By a settlement made by Henry Makdougall, 14th baron of Makerstoun, in 1715, the barony was infeft to his daughter Barbara Makdougall in 1723. She married Sir George Hay (later Hay-Makdougall), and the Makerstoun estate passed to the Hay-Makdougall family

== Makerstoun House ==
Makerstoun House, a square three storey building, is situated on the north bank of the Tweed, in the south of the parish, and stands in grounds (about 100 acres (40 ha)) that are extensive and well wooded.

The medieval house, originally a keep, was destroyed in Hertford's invasion of Scotland of 1545. A mansion was rebuilt in 1590 on the foundations of this house. The East end with a first floor vaulted chamber may be the oldest part, a pele tower, to which in the 15th century a wing was added on the West.

From 1714 to 1725 the house was extended on plans by William Adam, (father to Robert Adam the architect who created Edinburgh New Town). In 1828 further additions were made, including castellations.

Makerstoun House was rebuilt after a fire in 1973 using William Adam's plans of 1714–21, without castellation.

The burial ground of the Macdougall family is situated close to Makerstoun House. House and grounds contain a number of 18th and 19th century monuments, including that to Sir Thomas Makdougall Brisbane, Governor of New South Wales (d.1860).

The current owner is the 5th Baron Biddulph.
