= Ben Jordan: Paranormal Investigator =

Video game series

- Cover art for Ben Jordan: Paranormal Investigator
- Developer: Grundislav Games
- Publisher: Grundislav Games
- Director: Francisco Gonzalez
- Engine: Adventure Game Studio
- Platform: Microsoft Windows
- Release: Case 1: Original May 27, 2004 Deluxe August 8, 2006; Case 2: Original June 26, 2004 Enhanced March 25, 2010; Case 3: October 3, 2004; Case 4: March 4, 2005; Case 5: February 2, 2006; Case 6: August 29, 2007; Case 7: August 13, 2008; Case 8: August 8, 2012
- Genre: Point-and-click adventure
- Mode: Single-player

Ben Jordan: Paranormal Investigator is a freeware episodic point-and-click adventure video game for Microsoft Windows developed by Francisco Gonzalez of Grundislav Games. The game consists of eight individual episodes, or cases, with an overarching plot connecting them together. The game has won numerous Adventure Game Studio Awards, including a 2005 AGS Award for Best Gameplay.

== Gameplay ==
Ben Jordan: Paranormal Investigator is a point-and-click adventure game, designed in the style of the classic 1990's era games from that genre. Each case has a paranormal mystery that Ben must solve, by collecting evidence and other items, and using his notebook for important information. Like most games in the genre, the collected items are stored in an inventory, and can be used on items in the environment in order to solve the game's puzzles. Each episode ends with a final confrontation with the paranormal creature that is featured in that case.

== Synopsis ==
The game's titular character, Ben Jordan, is a recent college graduate who decides to become a paranormal investigator. In each case, Ben is called upon to investigate a different paranormal phenomenon. The game uses real life myths and legends as the basis for the paranormal creatures that Ben encounters.

=== Plot summary ===
Ben Jordan has just graduated from college, and decides to become a paranormal investigator. Shortly after advertising his services, he is called to Florida in order to investigate a series of murders in a national park. Ben learns that the murders were believed to have been caused by a sasquatch known as the skunk ape.

After successfully solving his first case, he soon receives a call from a distraught woman whose husband has gone missing after searching for gold from a lost Spanish galleon that was rumored to be buried in the Salton Sea.

Shortly after returning from his second case, Ben is called to Smailholm, a small village in Scotland, to investigate the murder of two children which was said to have been the work of witches.

As Ben's reputation is growing, he receives a call to come to London, England to investigate a mysterious house known as Number 50, which was said to be haunted by the victims of a horrific incident that happened there 150 years prior. Ben discovers that he is only one of five paranormal investigators that have been called to investigate, and soon finds himself working with others for the first time in his career.

Ben becomes friends with two of the other number 50 investigators, Alice Wilkins and Simon Booth. He accompanies them to Osaka, Japan to investigate the mysterious deaths of important company managers which are believed to be caused by zombies.

After solving their second case together, the trio decides to take a vacation in Greece. Once there, however, Ben learns about Sea People which are said to drag villagers in Agia Anna down into the ocean to eat them. He decides to investigate, without letting his companions know of his plans.

After Ben's sixth case, he spends Christmas with his family in Philadelphia. Afterward, he is called to Rome by an actor who killed a priest, but claims that he only did so because he was possessed by a demon. While investigating, Ben discovers a secret organization known as the Knights of St. Anthony, and also learns about a plot which threatens his future.

After the tragic events in Rome, things look bleak for Ben. However, he soon learns secrets which allow him to confront the mad man behind the plot.

== Cases ==
The game was separated into eight episodes, or cases, that were released over the course of eight years.

Chapter	Episode Release date
Case 1: "In Search of the Skunk-Ape"	May 27, 2004 (Original); August 8, 2006 (Deluxe)
Notes: After graduating from college and becoming a paranormal investigator, Ben Jordan is called to Florida to investigate a series of murders which are believed to have been caused by a skunk ape.
Case 2: "The Lost Galleon of the Salton Sea"	June 26, 2004 (Original); March 25, 2010 (Deluxe)
Notes: Ben investigates the disappearance of a man who was searching for the treasure ship, The Lost Galleon, in the Salton Sea.
Case 3: "The Sorceress of Smailholm"	October 3, 2004
Notes: Ben investigates the murder of two children in a tiny village in Scotland that was said to be the work of witches.
Case 4: "Horror at Number 50"	March 4, 2005
Notes: Ben travels to London to investigate the stories of ghosts and paranormal activity at the mysterious Number 50.
Case 5: "Land of the Rising Dead"	February 2, 2006
Notes: Ben travels to Osaka, Japan to investigate a series of murders that are said to be caused by zombies.
Case 6: "Scourge of the Sea People"	August 29, 2007
Notes: While on vacation in Greece, Ben learns of creatures called Sea People who drag villagers under the ocean to eat them.
Case 7: "The Cardinal Sins"	August 13, 2008
Notes: A man who is accused of murdering a priest calls up Ben begging him to come to Rome to try to clear his name, claiming that he was possessed by a demon.
Case 8: "Relics of the Past"	August 8, 2012
Notes: Ben learns the secrets in the past and present that let him confront the mad man who's threatening his future.

== Development ==
Ben Jordan: Paranormal Investigator was released over the course of eight years. As the games progressed, so did the presentation and quality. Because of this, remakes of the first two cases were released with the art style and interface of the later games in the series.

== Reception ==
Ben Jordan: Paranormal Investigator received more media attention than is usual for a freeware adventure game. It was reviewed by PC Zone, Adventure Gamers, and Just Adventure, and it was covered by Rock, Paper, Shotgun. 1UP.com named it one of "the best games that money can't buy", PC Gamer recommended it in their Year of Free Games feature, and Maximum PC named it one of the "free adventure games you should be playing right now". Additionally, Gamasutra noted its popularity and Hardcore Gamer noted that it had won several awards.

=== Awards ===
- IndieGames.com's Best Freeware Games of 2007, Case 6: Scourge of the Sea People
- IndieGames.com's Best Freeware Games of 2008, Case 7: The Cardinal Sins
- AGS Award for "Best Gameplay in an AGS Game", Case 4: Horror at Number 50 (2005, won)
- AGS Award for "Best Voice Work", Case 2 Deluxe (2010, won)
- AGS Award for "Best Player Character", Case 8: Relics of the Past (2012, won)
- AGS Award for "Best Non-Player Character", Case 8: Relics of the Past (2012, won)
