= Sir Murray Pringle, 10th Baronet =

British accountant and baronet

Arms of the Pringles of Stichill: Azure, three escallops, or

Sir Norman Murray Archibald MacGregor Pringle, 10th Baronet FCMA (born 3 August 1941) is a Scottish accountant. In 2016, he won a legal case establishing that he was the rightful heir to the Pringle baronetcy, using DNA evidence that proved his cousin, who had been accepted as the 9th Baronet in 1919, was not the biological son of the 8th Baronet.

== Succession to baronetcy ==
Murray Pringle was born in 1941, the eldest of two sons born to Ronald Steuart Pringle (1905–1968) and his wife, Janet Patricia Pickford, daughter of Capt. George Todd Pickford of Nairobi. Ronald Steuart was the second son of Sir Norman Robert Pringle, 8th Baronet (1871–1919) by his wife, Florence Madge Vaughan. The 8th Baronet married on 16 October 1902, and his wife gave birth to a first son, Norman Hamilton Pringle, seven months later on 13 May 1903, leading to questions of legitimacy that were not resolved until more than a century later.

Squadron Leader Norman Hamilton Pringle, de facto 9th Baronet (1903–1961) inherited the Pringle baronetcy as a teenager in 1919, when the 8th Baronet died of tuberculosis following the First World War. In turn, Norman Hamilton Pringle was succeeded by his eldest son, Sir Steuart Pringle KCB and de facto 10th Baronet. After Sir Steuart's death in 2013, DNA evidence demonstrated that Sir Steuart's father was not the biological son of Sir Norman Pringle, 8th Baronet. In 2016, the court agreed Norman Murray Pringle was the rightful heir to the baronetcy instead of his first cousin once removed Simon Pringle, Sir Steuart's eldest son and heir apparent. The court determined that Norman Hamilton Pringle was proven with a "high degree of probability" to be fathered not by the 8th Baronet, and Sir Steuart and his father were removed posthumously from the Official Roll of the Baronetage.

The Queen, acting under the Judicial Committee Act 1833, referred the matter to the Judicial Committee of the Privy Council, which held its hearings on the matter in November 2015 and January 2016. It delivered its ruling on 20 June 2016, determining that DNA evidence proved that Sir Norman Hamilton Pringle, 9th de facto Baronet, was conceived by an unknown father and was not the biological son of Sir Norman Robert Pringle, 8th Baronet.

In delivering the judgment, Lord Hodge stated that the court had no reason to reject DNA evidence in title claims, and it was not for the court to consider potential social outcomes based on DNA evidence:

In the past, the absence of scientific evidence meant that the presumption of legitimacy could rarely be rebutted and claims based on assertions that irregular procreations had occurred in the distant past were particularly difficult to establish. Not so now. It is not for the Board to express any view on what social policy should be. It notes the ability of DNA evidence to reopen a family succession many generations into the past. Whether this is a good thing and whether legal measures are needed to protect property transactions in the past, the rights of the perceived beneficiary of a trust of property, and the long established expectations of a family, are questions for others to consider.

On 27 June 2016, Grant Bavister, Assistant Register to the Baronetage at the Ministry of Justice, entered Sir Ronald Steuart Pringle and his son Sir Norman Murray Pringle onto the Official Roll of the Baronetage, as the 9th and 10th de jure Baronets. He also removed the de facto 9th and 10th Baronets, Norman Hamilton Pringle and his son Steuart Robert Pringle, from the Roll, in accordance with the Royal Warrant of 1910. Certificates of succession to this effect were issued to Sir Norman Murray Pringle on 1 July 2016.

== Personal life ==
Sir Norman married firstly Lysbet Watkins-Pitchford on 11 September 1966. They had two children:

- Alastair Steuart Ronald Pringle (born 23 May 1972), heir apparent to the baronetcy, married Chanel van Staden who went on to have four daughters
- Siân Amanda Pringle (born 23 May 1972), married Barend Niemandt who went on to have three daughters

Lysbet died in 1991. He married secondly Patricia Nadine Millem on 24 August 1992.

== See also ==
- Pringle baronets
- Clan Pringle

Baronetage of Nova Scotia
Preceded by Sir Ronald Steuart Pringle, de jure 9th Baronet; Sir Steuart Pringle, de facto 10th Baronet	Baronet (of Stichill); 2016–present	Incumbent; Heir apparent: Alastair Steuart Ronald Pringle
