= Pringle (disambiguation) =

Pringle is a Scottish surname.

Pringle(s) may also refer to:

== Places ==
In the United States

- Pringle, Georgia, an unincorporated community
- Pringle, Pennsylvania, borough
- Pringle, South Dakota, town
- Pringle, Texas, an unincorporated community

Elsewhere

- The Pringle, informal name for the London Velopark

== Other ==
- Clan Pringle an Lowland Scottish clan from the Scottish Borders
- Pringles, potato-based snack
- Pringle manoeuvre, used in surgery
- USS Pringle (DD-477), US Navy destroyer sunk in World War II
- Pringles Park, baseball stadium in Jackson, Tennessee, named after the snack
- Pringle of Scotland, designer clothing brand based in Scotland

== See also ==
- Pringle Bay, town in South Africa
