= Nileas =

Nileas Νηλέας
- Municipal unit
- Location within the regional unit

- Location within Greece
- Coordinates: 38°52′N 23°24′E
- Country: Greece
- Administrative region: Central Greece
- Regional unit: Euboea
- Municipality: Mantoudi-Limni-Agia Anna

Area
  - Municipal unit: 129.02 km^{2} (49.81 sq mi)

Population (2021)
  - Municipal unit: 2,261
  - Municipal unit density: 17.52/km^{2} (45.39/sq mi)
- Time zone: UTC+2 (EET)
  - Summer (DST): UTC+3 (EEST)
- Vehicle registration: ΧΑ

Nileas (Greek: Νηλέας) is a former municipality in Euboea, Greece, named after the river Nilèas. Since the 2011 local government reform it is part of the municipality Mantoudi-Limni-Agia Anna, of which it is a municipal unit. The municipal unit has an area of 129.017 km^{2}. Population 2,261 (2021). The seat of the municipality was in Agia Anna.
