= Standing Council of the Baronetage =

British organisation for baronets

The Standing Council of the Baronetage is a United Kingdom organisation which deals with the affairs of baronets. It was first established in January 1898 as the Honourable Society of the Baronetage. In July 1903, it was reconstituted as a permanent organisation under the name of the Standing Council of the Baronetage.

Its roles include publishing the Official Roll of the Baronetage, providing advice to those wishing to prove their succession to a baronetage, providing an environment for social interaction between members of the society, and making contributions to charitable good causes. Membership of the organisation is restricted to recognised baronets and their heirs apparent. In order to be officially recognised by the council as a baronet, an individual's name must be entered on the Official Roll of the Baronetage.
