= Robert Pringle, Lord Edgefield =

Scottish judge

Robert Pringle, Lord Edgefield (c.1700–1764) was a Scottish judge and Senator of the College of Justice.

== Life ==
He was the son of Thomas Pringle WS an Edinburgh lawyer and his wife, Rebecca Hay. His grandfather was Sir Robert Pringle, 1st Baronet of Stitchell.

He studied law and passed the bar as an advocate in 1724.

In 1748 he was made Sheriff Depute of Banff. On 20 November 1754 he was elected a Senator of the college of justice in place of the late Lord Leven.

His house in Edinburgh stood on the Royal Mile with a long garden siding onto Leith Wynd.

He died on 8 April 1764.

His position as Senator was filled by James Ferguson, Lord Pitfour.
