= Greenknowe Tower =

16th-century tower house in the Scottish Borders

Coordinates: 55.67734°N 2.57560°W

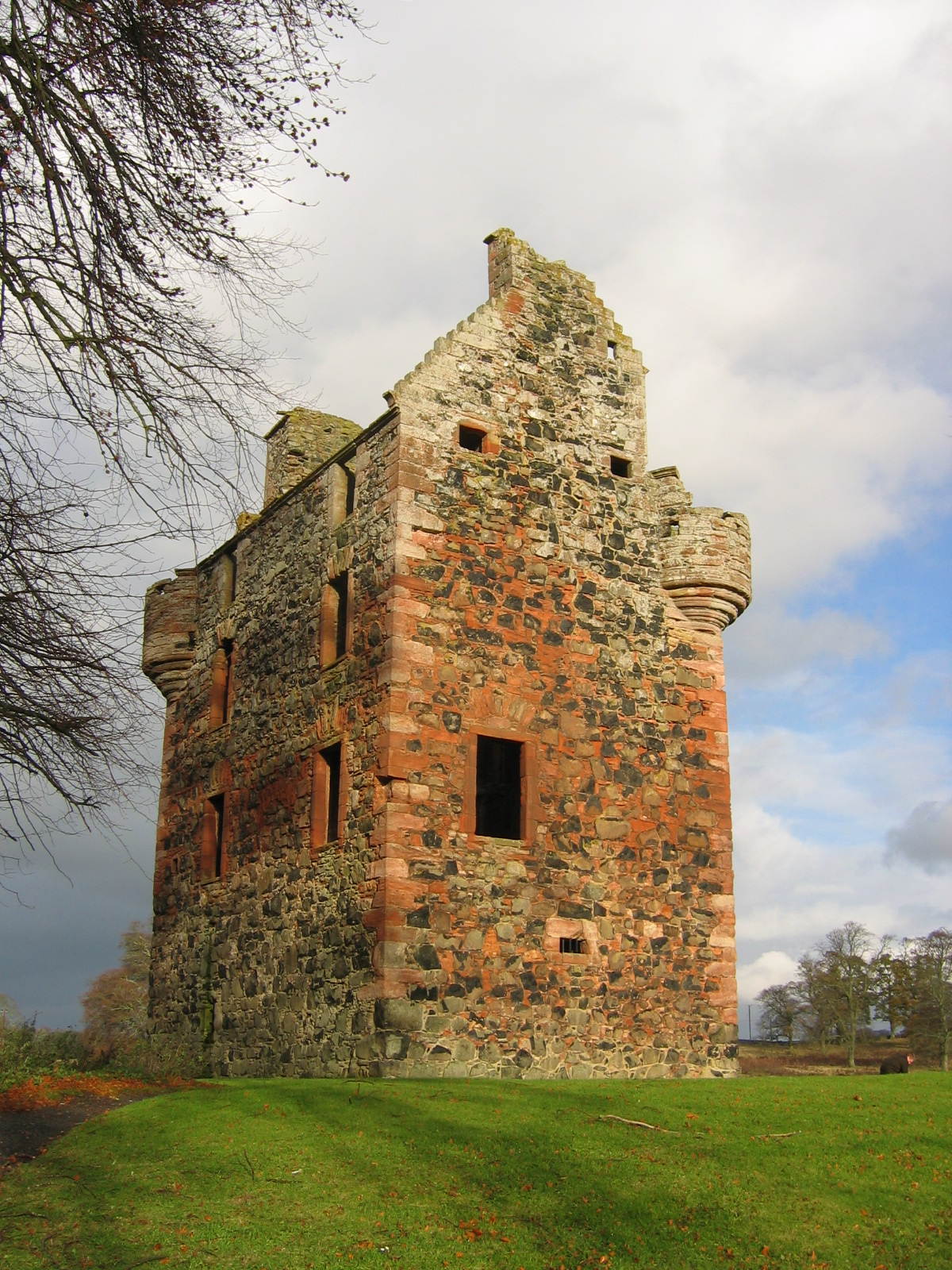
- Greenknowe Tower, seen from the south-west
- Interactive map of the Greenknowe Tower area

General information
- Location: Scottish Borders, Gordon, Scotland

Greenknowe Tower is a 16th-century tower house, located just west of the village of Gordon, in the Scottish Borders. Although a roofless ruin, the stonework of the tower is well preserved, and represents a fine example of a later tower house, built more as a residence rather than as a place of defence. The building is located at NT639428, beside the A6105 road. It is a Scheduled Ancient Monument, and is in the care of Historic Scotland.

== History ==
The lands of Greenknowe were obtained by the Setons of Touch in the early 15th century, when Alexander Seton married a Gordon heiress. The tower was built in 1581 by James Seton, and the date, his initials, and the initials of his wife Janet Edmonstone, are inscribed above the door. The castle is situated on a low natural mound, which was originally surrounded and defended by marshy ground.

In the 17th century, the tower was sold to the Pringles of Stichill, who made additions to the building, and enlarged the windows to suit the less dangerous times. The castle was occupied until the mid 19th century, and passed into state care in 1937 following restoration works.

== The tower ==
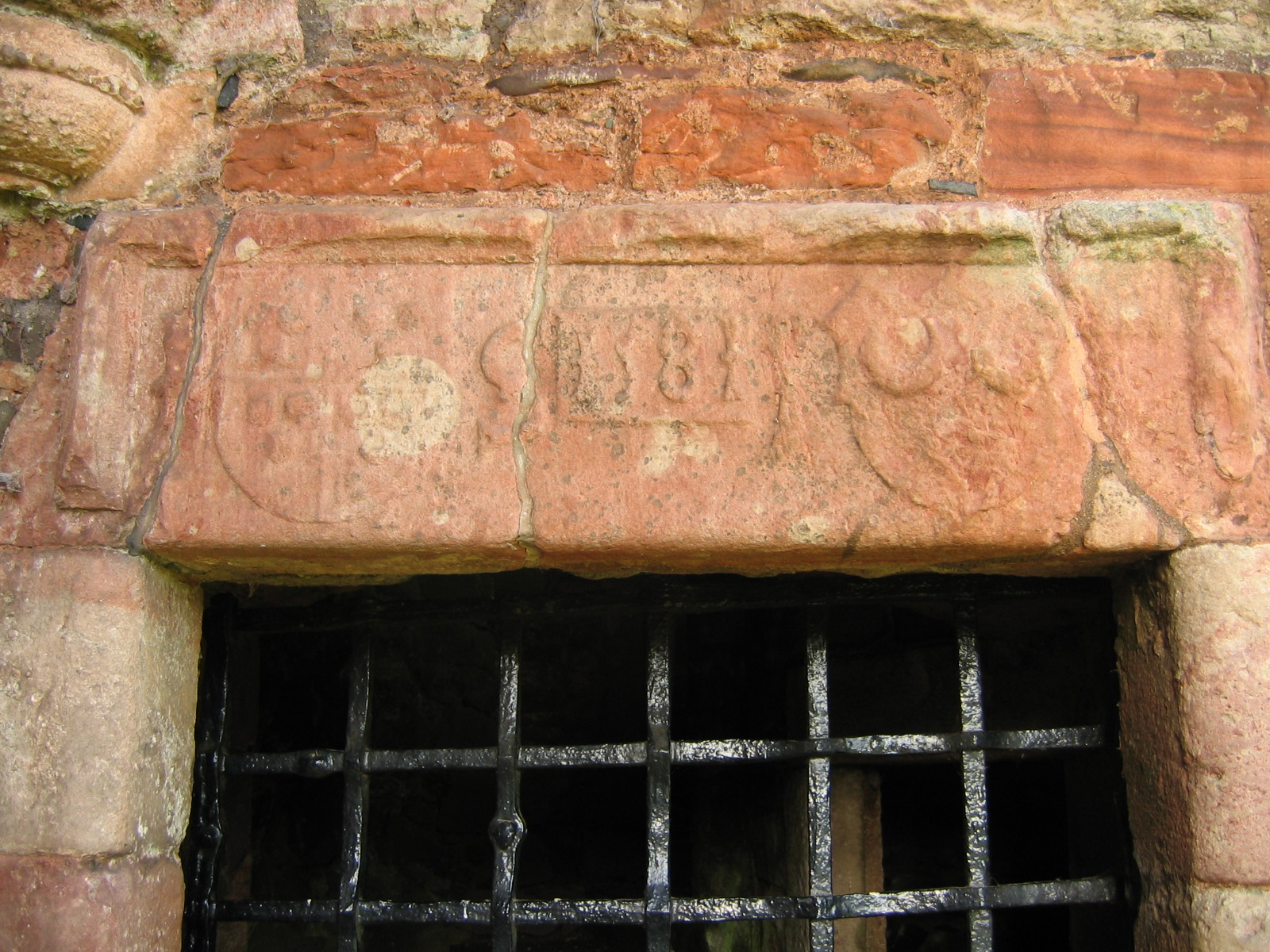
Inscription above the door. IS for James Seton, IE for Janet Edmonstone, his wife, with their respective coats of arms, and the date 1581.

Greenknowe is an example of an L-plan tower, with a main block of four storeys, and a stair wing on the east side of five storeys. The main block is around 10.5m by 7m, with walls 1.2m thick. The wing projects 3.3m and is 4.5m wide.

The tower is entered by a door in the re-entrant angle, which retains its original iron gate or yett. This gives access to a vaulted basement, originally divided into kitchen and cellar. The kitchen has a broad fireplace, slop drain and cupboard in the north wall, with a hatch overhead into the hall. Iron meat hooks remain in the ceiling.

Beneath the stair is a small chamber which accesses an east-facing gunloop. The broad turnpike stair leads up to the hall level, from which a smaller stair accesses the upper storeys. This stair is built into a corbelled turret in the re-entrant angle.

The hall occupies the first floor of the main block. There is a large fireplace in the east wall, and four large windows. Blocked doorways in the north walls of the hall and the stair once gave access to the north range, which was built in the 17th century but has since been demolished. Above the hall, the floors of the main block each had two rooms, with a further four rooms, one above the other, in the wing. All the rooms had fireplaces.

The walls are of rubble construction, using local basalt with red sandstone for detailing, and finish at crowstep gables. Bartizans, or angle-turrets, are found at the north-west and south-east corners of the main block, and the south-east corner of the wing. The smaller wing bartizan also had machicolations.

The tower once had fine gardens laid out to the west, no trace of which remains. The foundation of an outbuilding lies to the north-east.
