= Bassendean, Scottish Borders =

Village in Scotland

Coordinates: 55°42′13″N 2°35′20″W

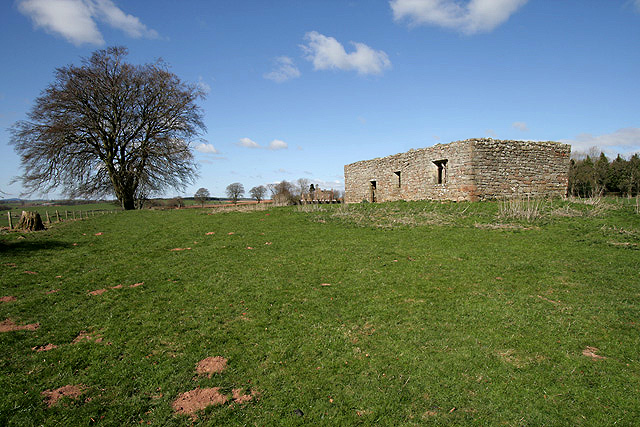
The remains of Bassendean Church

Bassendean is a village in the Scottish Borders area of Scotland, 4 kilometres (2.5 mi) south of Westruther and 3 kilometres (1.9 mi) north-west of Gordon. It is by the Eden Water in the former Berwickshire, immediately south of the hamlet of Houndslow.

The medieval village of Bassendean declined in the 17th century, and only a ruined church now remains of the settlement. The church, dedicated to St Mary, was established in the 12th century. Disused after the Scottish Reformation, it was rebuilt in 1647, but was replaced only two years later by a new church at Westruther. It subsequently became the burial ground for the Homes of Bassendean.

Bassendean House has been the seat of the Homes of Bassendean since 1583. Only a fragment of the original tower house remains, although the 17th-century house is still in domestic occupation. The house and the ruins of the church are both protected as Category B listed buildings.

During the 1830s, the Colonial Secretary of Western Australia, Peter Broun, who had ancestral ties to Berwickshire, gave the name Bassendean to his homestead near Perth, Western Australia. By the 1920s, the surrounding suburb had also become known Bassendean and was officially renamed.

== See also ==
- List of places in the Scottish Borders
