= Smailholm Tower =

Peel tower at Smailholm in the Scottish Borders

Coordinates: 55.60365°N 2.57770°W

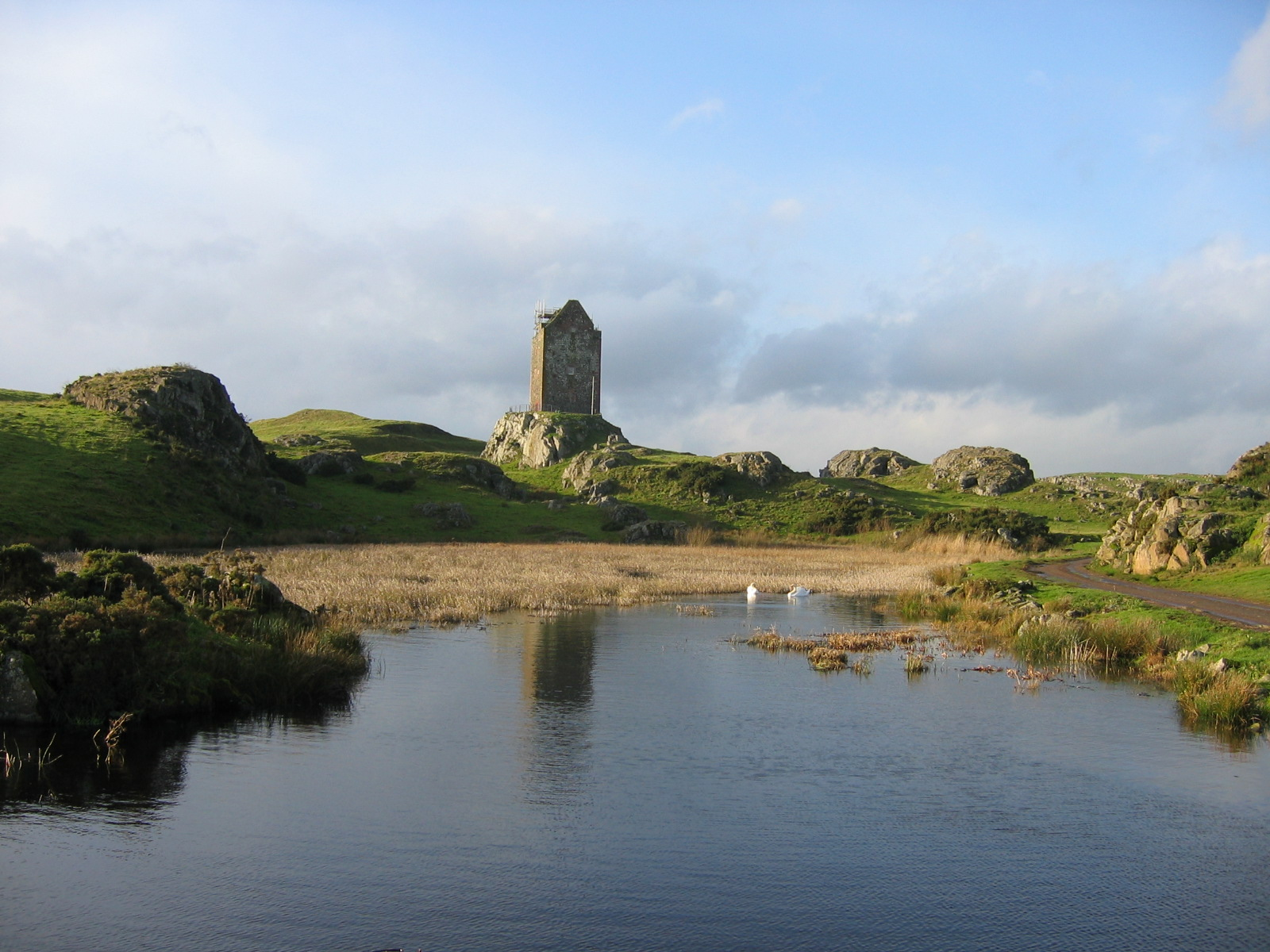
- Smailholm Tower from the east across the lochan from near Sandyknowe Farm
- Interactive map of the Smailholm Tower area

General information
- Location: Scottish Borders, Smailholm, Scotland
- Completed: 15th century or early 16th century

Technical details
- Size: 12.1 m by 9.4 m

Smailholm Tower is a peel tower at Smailholm, around five miles (8 km) west of Kelso in the Scottish Borders. Its dramatic situation, atop a crag of Lady Hill, commands wide views over the surrounding countryside. The tower is located at grid reference NT637346, just west of Sandyknowe farm, and is now a Scheduled Ancient Monument in the care of Historic Environment Scotland. In June 2007, it was awarded the maximum "five-star" status as a tourist attraction from VisitScotland, a rating bestowed on only eight other sites in Scotland.

== History ==
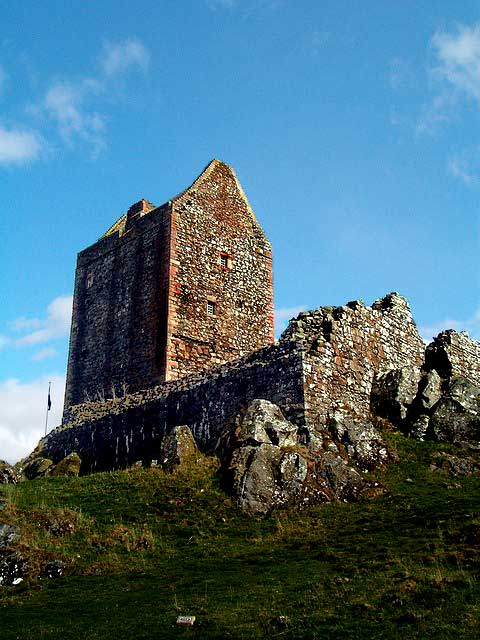
Smailholm Tower, showing the barmkin wall in the foreground

Smailholm Tower was originally built in the 15th century or early 16th century by the Pringle family. This family, originally Hoppringle, who were followers of the Earl of Douglas, held the lands of Smailholm from the early 15th century, and managed part of Ettrick Forest for their feudal superior.

In December 1482, James Hoppringill of Smailholm, son of David Hoppingrill, was sued for 300 merks by Margaret Kerr. He married Isobell Murray, their heir was David Hoppringill who married Margaret Lundy, and their eldest son was also called David.

Smailholm Tower was designed, in common with all Scottish peel towers, to provide its occupants with protection from sporadic English raids. The tower was attacked by English soldiers in 1543, 1544 and again in 1546, when the garrison of Wark Castle sacked the tower and carried off prisoners and cattle. The castle was successfully defended against the English in 1640, by Sir Andrew Ker of Greenhead.

Smailholm was obtained by the Scotts of Harden around this time. The Scotts – ancestors of Sir Walter – rebuilt parts of the tower and barmkin. In the 18th century the tower decayed, following the family's move into nearby Sandyknowe. The last owner, the Earl of Ellesmere, handed the property into state care in 1950. It was restored in the 1980s, and now operates as a museum.

== The tower ==
Smailholm was a relatively small tower house, offering around 200 m^{2} of floorspace, later extended by construction of a hall house and second kitchen within the barmkin, or courtyard.

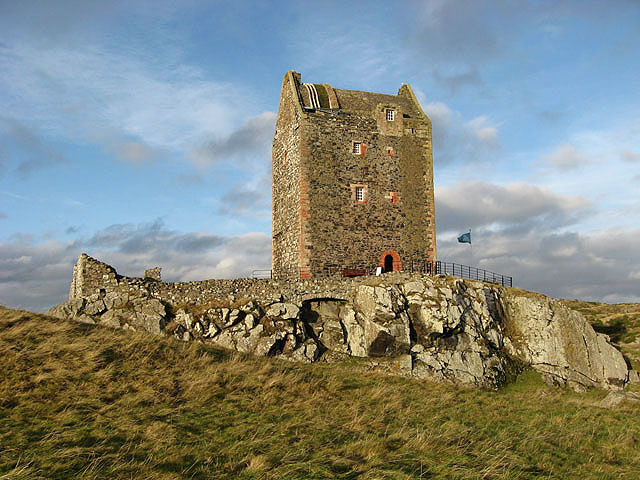
Smailholm Tower from the north-west

The rectangular tower is of four storeys, situated on top of a rocky outcrop. The tower is approximately 12.1 m by 9.4 m, with basalt rubble walls 2.4 m thick. The vaulted basement was originally divided into two floors by a wooden entresol reached by a ladder. The door is on the south side, in a large red sandstone arch, with the turnpike stair in the south-east corner. Above the vault is the hall, with a fireplace to the north featuring a carved human face.

The top floor has an unusual elliptical stone vault which supports a stone flag roof. Parapet walks run along the longer north and south sides, although both are interrupted – the north by a chimney and the south by a window. These upper parts of the tower, including a gunloop in the west gable covering the barmkin, were remodelled in the 17th century.

The tower is surrounded by the remains of a stone barmkin wall, within which the ruins of outbuildings and a small chapel are still visible. The east part of the barmkin once contained a small garden, all of which is now gone. The western barmkin is more intact, with walls up to first floor level around the narrow entrance in the west wall. The courtyard, around 16 m by 19 m, contains the foundations of a single-storey hall house of the 17th century to the north, and a two-roomed kitchen block to the south.

A ditch protects the western approach to the tower, the other three sides being naturally protected by the face of the outcrop. One hundred metres to the southeast, more earthworks mark the presence of a much older settlement, probably dating from the first millennium BC.

Smailholm Tower is now used to display an extensive array of model people illustrating the history of Smailholm and the stories of Walter Scott, a display created by two local artists and employing high-quality embroidery and modelling techniques. From 2006 experiments were conducted on the roof to establish the most suitable damp-proofing method to apply to other such properties, including the planting of turf or mats of sedum plants. As a result of this, a restoration project in 2010/11 reinstated a turf roof over the entire structure.

== Sir Walter Scott ==
The tower provided inspiration to Sir Walter Scott, who visited his paternal grandfather here when still a boy. Scott spent considerable time at the tower during his youth, reportedly for the benefit of his health. Smailholm provides the setting for Scott's ballad The Eve of St John, and also appears in Marmion.

As a result of Scott's poetry, his uncle restored the tower, making it safe, around 1800. J. M. W. Turner visited Smailholm with Scott in the author's later years; his sketch of the tower was included in Scott's Poetical Works. Turner's journey with Scott traced scenes from Marmion, and not long after this, the English pioneer of photography Henry Fox Talbot repeated Turner's itinerary, publishing what is considered to be the first photographic travelogue or tourist coffee-table book, Sun Pictures in Scotland in homage to both Scott and Turner.

== In popular culture ==
Smailholm Tower was the centrepiece of the children's adventure novel In the Keep of Time by Margaret J. Anderson, in which four English children staying with their aged Aunt Grace travel through time by means of a magical key, first to the time of James II, then to a future after the fall of civilization.

It also features in the book Smailholm by C. L. Williams, in which thirteen-year-old Wynn discovers a miniature village hidden close to Smailholm Tower.

== See also ==
- Clan Pringle
- Brotherstone Hill
- List of places in the Scottish Borders
- List of places in Scotland
- Castles in Scotland
