= Agia Anna, Euboea =

Agia Anna Αγία Άννα
- Community
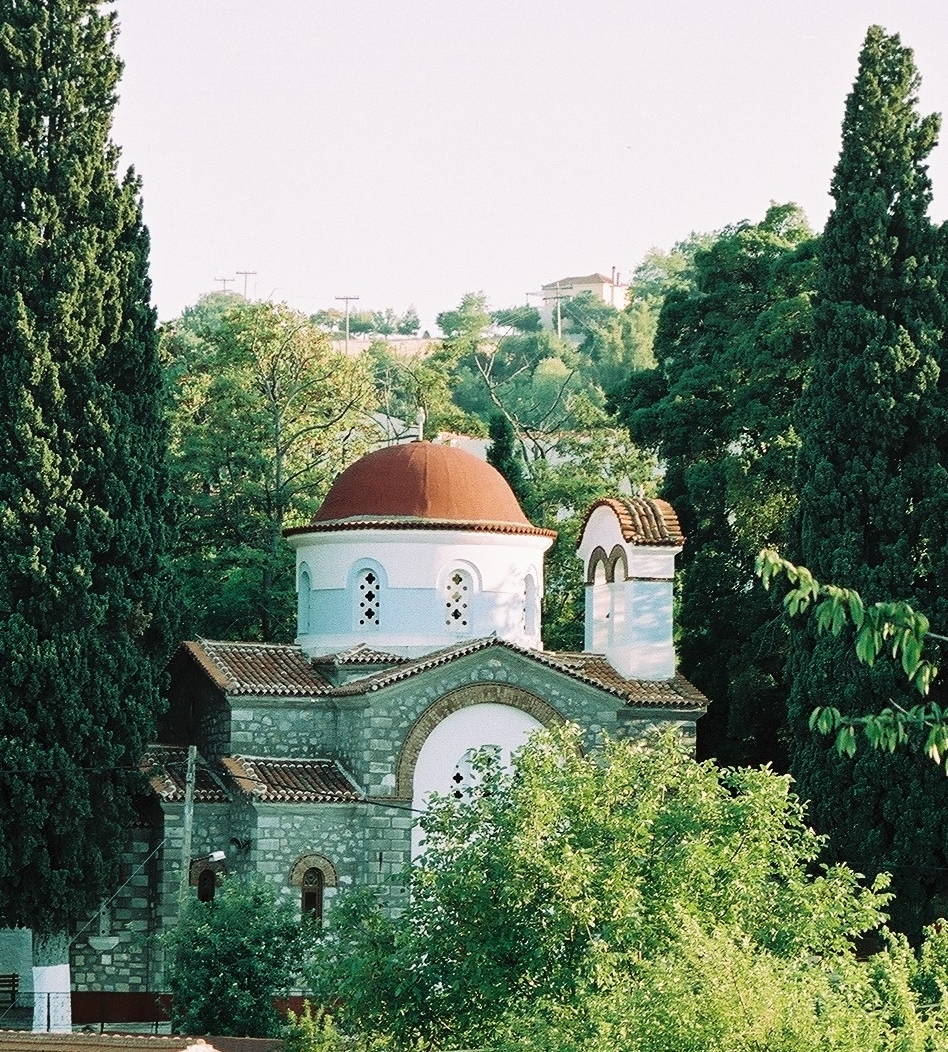
- The church of Saint Anna in Agia Anna

- Location within Greece
- Coordinates: 38°51′36″N 23°23′56″E
- Country: Greece
- Administrative region: Central Greece
- Regional unit: Euboea
- Municipality: Mantoudi-Limni-Agia Anna
- Municipal unit: Nileas

Population (2021)
  - Community: 1,062
- Time zone: UTC+2 (EET)
  - Summer (DST): UTC+3 (EEST)

Agia Anna (Greek: Αγία Άννα) is a village and a community in the municipal unit Nileas, in northern part of the island Euboea, Greece. The community includes the seaside village Agkali (Αγκάλι). At about 7 km, it has one of the longest beaches in Europe. It lies 12 km northeast of Limni and 47 km north of Chalkida. During winter, there are about 1000 inhabitants, with the number increasing highly during summer to around 7000 people. The commune is also famous for some of the best camping in Greece.

== History ==
According to legend, the name Agia Anna (Saint Anne) derives from a miracle related to a picture of Saint Anne. Around the 18th century, the villagers there survived after a pirate attack. After that, they found a picture of Saint Anne leading by a woman's vision. Specifically, the village was built in 1776. During the Ottoman occupation of Greece, Agia Anna had been the largest and richest commune of the area, with 60 families residing there.
