= Brotherstone Hill =

Hill in the Scottish Borders area of Scotland

Coordinates: 55.6162°N 2.6064°W

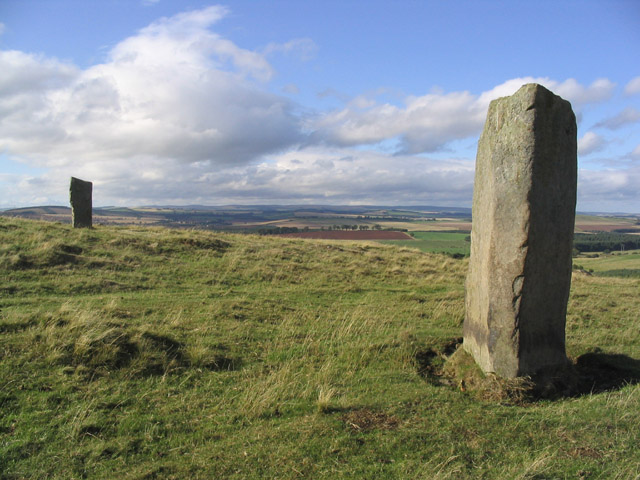
The Brothers' Stones

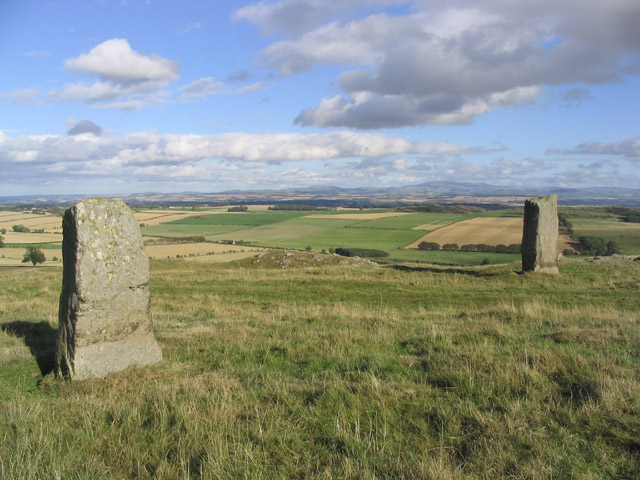
Brotherstone Hill

Brotherstone Hill is a hill near St. Boswells and the Eildon Hills in the Scottish Borders area of Scotland, with two standing stones from the megalithic age, on the summit of Brotherstone Hill, at a height of 418 metres. The stones differ in height (2.45m and 1.60m) and stand 16 metres apart. The stones mark the boundary between the old Borders counties of Roxburghshire and Berwickshire.

Brotherstone Farm is situated off a minor road, between the villages of Gattonside and Smailholm.

== See also ==
- Standing stones
- List of places in the Scottish Borders
- List of places in Scotland
