= Eden Water =

River in Scottish Borders, Scotland

Coordinates: 55°38′N 2°22′W

Eden Water is a tributary of the River Tweed in the Scottish Borders of Scotland. "Water" is the Lowland Scots term for a small river.

The Eden Burn rises to the east of Lauder at Corsbie Moor on Boon Farm. The Eden Water passes Bassendean village and Bassendean House and the hamlets of Fawside and Mack's Mill. Next is the county town of Gordon, and the Water flows through Gordon East Mains, under the A6105, then through the Mellerstain House estate, and the river now turns east towards Old Nenthorn, Nenthorn House, and Nenthorn where the A6089, the B6404 and the B6364 pass over it. After passing by Ednam Cliftonhill and Ednam East Mill, the Eden Water joins the River Tweed where the A698 bridges it.

== Etymology ==
Eden is a fairly common outcome in English of a Brittonic river name that can be reconstructed as *ituna 'to gush forth'.

== See also ==
- Rivers of Scotland
- List of places in the Scottish Borders
- List of places in Scotland
