= Stichill =

Coordinates: 55.639°N 2.458°W

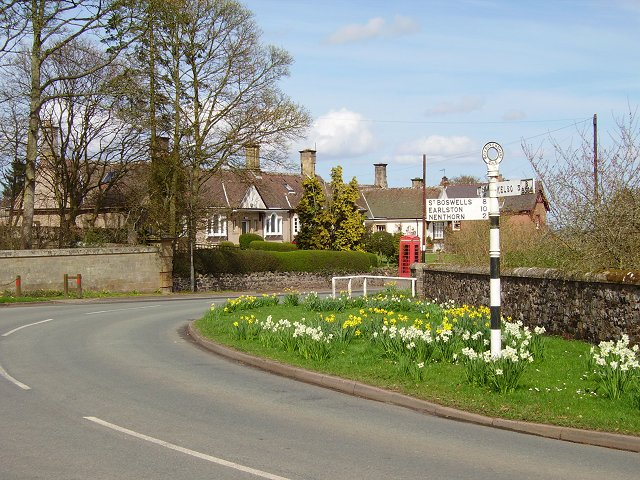
- Stichill

- Location within the Scottish Borders
- OS grid reference: NT712384
- Civil parish: Stichill
- Council area: Scottish Borders
- Lieutenancy area: Roxburgh, Ettrick and Lauderdale
- Country: Scotland
- Sovereign state: United Kingdom
- Post town: Kelso
- Postcode district: TD
- Police: Scotland
- Fire: Scottish
- Ambulance: Scottish
- UK Parliament: Berwickshire, Roxburgh and Selkirk
- Scottish Parliament: Ettrick, Roxburgh and Berwickshire

Stichill is a village and civil parish in the historic county of Roxburghshire, a division of the Scottish Borders. Situated 2 miles (3.2 km) north of the Burgh of Kelso, Stichill lies north of the Eden Water and 5 miles (8.0 km) from the English Border at Coldstream.

Stichill is mentioned as a manor of Sir Thomas Randolph, later the Earl of Moray, when in 1308 it was considered forfeited to Edward I of England and granted to Adam Gordon.

Kenneth Young's biography of Alec Douglas-Home discusses the historical association of the Home family with Stichill, referencing the Battle of Flodden and later ties between the Scottish and English aristocracy.

== Pringles ==
The village lies in the historic territory of the Pringles, a notorious Riding family of Border Reivers. The Pringles of Stichill are a cadet branch of the Pringles of that Ilk. Robert Pringle of Baitingbush purchased the lands of Stichill in 1628, and his grandson, another Robert Pringle, was created 1st Pringle Baronet of Stichill, in the Baronetcy of Nova Scotia, in 1683. The Current Baronet is Sir Norman Murray Archibald MacGregor Pringle of Stichill, 10th Baronet.

== See also ==
- Stichill Kirk
- List of places in the Scottish Borders
- List of places in East Lothian
- List of places in Midlothian
- List of places in Scotland
