= Official Roll of the Baronetage =

British register of baronets

The Official Roll of the Baronetage is an official list of baronets maintained by the Lord Chancellor; an abridged version is published online by the Standing Council of the Baronetage.

Any person wishing to prove succession to a baronetcy must furnish the necessary legal evidence. Many heirs to baronetcies have not yet done so. Because of the requirement to produce formal proof in support of a claim, if proceedings are not commenced immediately upon the death of a baronet, it becomes progressively more difficult for each succeeding holder to establish their right to the title. The Ministry of Justice has stated that it is not necessary to prove succession in order to make use of the title. However, a baronet whose name does not appear on the Official Roll of the Baronetage will not:

- be entitled to any precedence attaching to the baronetcy; or
- be entitled to be addressed or referred to by any title belonging to that baronetcy in any civil or military commission, letters patent or other official document.

As of January 2020, there were 1,245 baronetcies on the Official Roll, of which approximately 200 have no incumbent because the succession is dormant or unproven. Of these, 142 belong to the Baronetage of England, 60 to the Baronetage of Ireland, 116 to the Baronetage of Scotland, 125 to the Baronetage of Great Britain and 802 to the Baronetage of the United Kingdom. Among the current baronets, 254 are also peers. The oldest baronetcy by date of creation, that of the Premier Baronet, is held by Sir Nicholas Bacon, 14th Baronet, of Redgrave, whose title was created in 1611 in the Baronetage of England.

== See also ==
- Roll of the Peerage
- Standing Council of the Baronetage
- Baronetage of the United Kingdom
- Baronetage of England
- Baronetage of Nova Scotia
- Baronetage of Ireland
- Baronetage of Great Britain
