= Smailholm =

Village in Scottish Borders, Scotland

Coordinates: 55°37′N 2°34′W

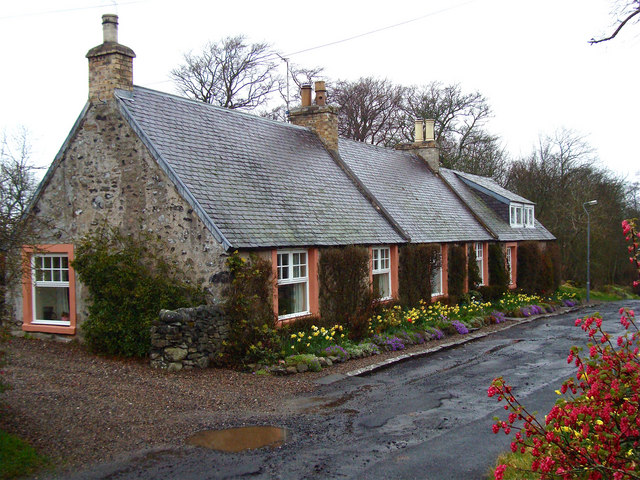
Cottages at Smailholm village

Smailholm (Scots: Smailhowm) is a small village in the historic county of Roxburghshire in south-east Scotland. It is at grid reference NT648364 and straddles the B6397 Gordon to Kelso road. The village is almost equidistant from both, standing 6 miles (10 km) northwest of the abbey town of Kelso. Since local government reorganisation in Scotland in the early 1970s, Smailholm has been part of the Scottish Borders Council.

== History ==
Smailholm, in keeping with most of the south eastern part of Scotland, was part of the ancient Kingdom of Northumbria and was named from the Old English language as Smael Ham, meaning "narrow village". In early mediaeval times, the village was larger than it is now and was divided into three separate parts, named East Third, West Third, and Overtown. Sir Walter Scott, as a boy, was a regular visitor to his grandfather's farm at Sandyknowe. Captain Cook's mother Jean was born in Smailholm and married his father in Smailholm Church. Before the end of the 18th century, there were two schools in the village, a parochial school and a private establishment at Sandyknowe. St. Cuthbert is believed to have been born at Wrangham, a long disappeared village at New Smailholm. King Edward I of England passed through Smailholm in 1303 on his march to Lauder.

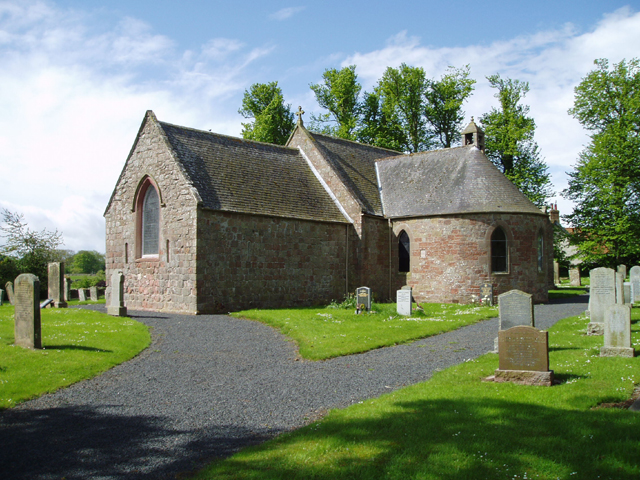
Smailholm Church

== Church ==
David de Oliford was granted the church and manor of Smailholm in the 12th century by King David I of Scotland. De Oliford subsequently granted the church and its tithes to the Benedictine monks of Coldingham Priory who held the church until the Scottish Reformation in 1560. Smailholm Kirk avoided demolition after the Reformation, and parts of an early Norman structure can still be seen in the chancel. The present church has undergone major renovations and renewals in 1632 and 1820. The church contains fine stained glass windows from 1907 commemorating Sir Walter Scott. Some of the ministers in the early years of the reformed church include David Forsyth, Archibald Oswald, and James Hunter. An archaeological watching brief was carried out in the church graveyard during Summer 2022 by Border Reivers Archaeology Unit.

== Smailholm Tower ==
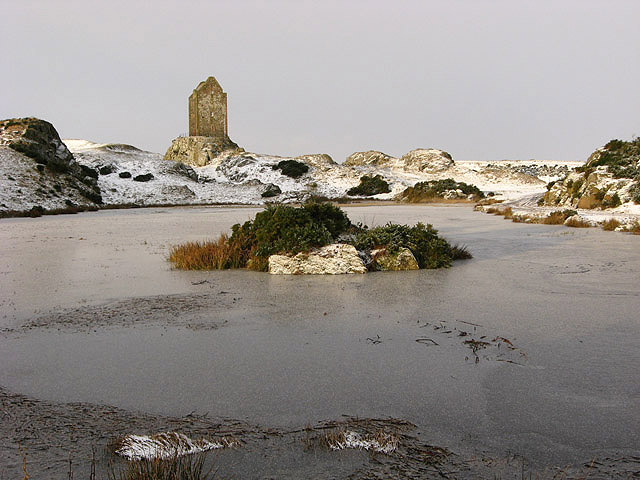
Smailholm Tower in the winter

Smailholm Tower, one in a string of Borders keeps guarding the Tweed valley, was built not later than the early 15th century, when it was held by the powerful Pringle family, four of whom were killed at the Battle of Flodden in 1513. The tower passed, in 1745, to the Scotts of Harden, but they left the structure in 1800. The tower fell into a perilous condition but was partially restored in the 1980s and is now in the care of Historic Scotland.

== In popular culture ==
- Smailholm appeared in the third case of Ben Jordan: Paranormal Investigator, in which the titular hero investigates the mysterious ritual murder of two local girls, and discovers a shocking secret about the town à la The Wicker Man.
- It features in the book by C.L. Williams titled Smailhom, in which thirteen-year-old Wynn discovers a miniature village hidden close to Smailholm Tower.

== Transport ==
Buses are run by Scottish Borders Council.

== See also ==
- Brotherstone Hill
- List of places in the Scottish Borders
- List of places in Scotland

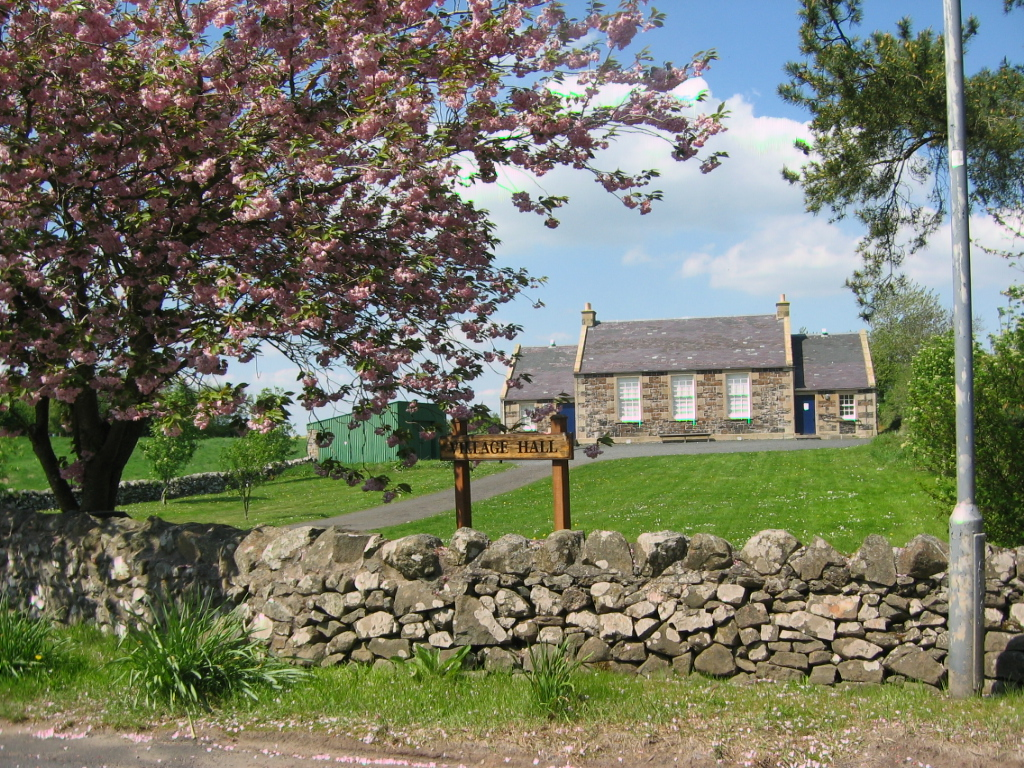
The Village Hall at Smailholm

== External links and further reading ==
- Smailholm village website
- RCAHMS/Canmore record for the Manor of Smailholm
- RCAHMS/Canmore record for Smailholm church
- RCAHMS record for Parish of Smailholm
- SCRAN image: Smailholm tower
- Statistical Accounts of Scotland
- Ordnance Gazetteer of Scotland edited by Francis Groome

=== More photographs ===
Geograph images at grid reference NT6436
