= Clan Hope =

Lowland Scottish clan

- Crest: A broken terrestrial globe surmounted by a rainbow issuing out of a cloud at each end all Proper.
- Motto: At Spes Infracta (Yet my hope is unbroken)

Profile
- Region: Lowlands
- District: Fife

Chief
- Sir Alexander Archibald Douglas Hope of Craighall,
- 19th Baronet Hope of Craighall
- Seat: Westleigh Avenue, London.
- Historic seat: Craighall, Fife
Clan branches
Hopes of Craighill (chiefs)
Hopes of Hopetoun

Clan Hope is a Scottish clan of the Scottish Lowlands.

== History ==
=== Origins of the clan ===
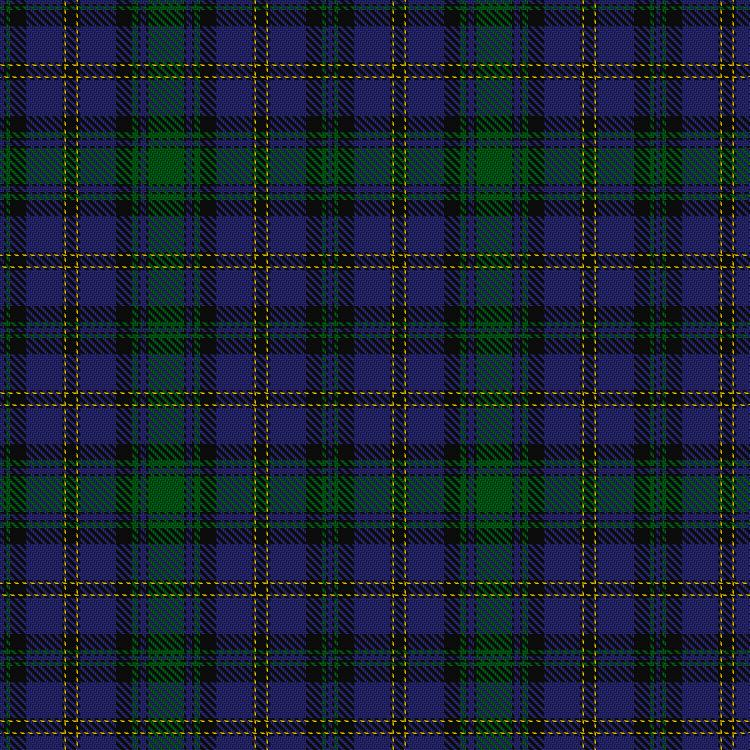
Tartan Hope

The surname Hope may be of native Scottish origin, being derived from the Scottish Borders family of Hop or Hoip. In 1296 John de Hop of Peeblesshire and Adam le Houp both appear on the Ragman Rolls submitting to Edward I of England. Alexander Nisbet suggested that the name may be from the H'oublons of Picardy family in France. The French word houblon means hop, which when translated into English becomes Hope.

The immediate ancestor of the principal line of the clan was John de Hope who is said to have come to Scotland from France in 1537 as part of the retinue of Magdalen, the first wife of James V of Scotland.

=== 16th century ===
John married and settled in Edinburgh where he prospered. He had a son named Edward who in 1560 was a commissioner to the General Assembly of the Church of Scotland for Edinburgh.

=== 17th century ===
John's descendant, Sir Thomas Hope, was appointed Lord Advocate by Charles I. Thomas acquired the estate of Craighall which is in the parish of Ceres, county of Fife. Craighall became the chief's designation. Sir Thomas was a lawyer whose work Hopes Practicks is still sometimes referred to by Scots lawyers today. He was created a Baronet of Nova Scotia in 1628 and helped draft the National Covenant in 1638. He died in 1646 and his eldest son succeeded to the Baronetcy, taking the title Lord Craighall. He is credited with having advised Charles II while in exile to treat with Cromwell for the one half of his cloak before he lost the whole.

A junior branch of the clan were the Hopes of Hopetoun who descend from a younger son of the Lord Advocate. This son acquired lands in West Lothian and took the territorial style, Hopetoun. His son was John Hope of Hopetoun who drowned in the wreckage of the Gloucester and it is believed that he died saving the Duke of York (later James VII of Scotland and II of England).

=== 18th century ===
John Hope of Hopetoun's son was Charles Hope who in 1702 was elected to Parliament for Linlithgow. He was later appointed to the Privy Council and in 1703 was raised in the peerage as Earl of Hopetoun.

In 1729 the sixth Baronet sold the estate of Craighill to his kinsman the Earl of Hopetoun. The Earl of Hopetoun's estates grew rapidly in the 18th century with most of West Lothian, and parts of East Lothian and Lanarkshire.

=== 19th century ===
Sir John Hope, 4th Earl of Hopetoun had a notable military career, serving throughout the Peninsular War. In 1822 he staged a magnificent reception for George IV at Hoptoun during the king's famous visit to Scotland.

== Clan chief ==
The hereditary chief of Clan Hope is Sir Alexander Archibald Douglas Hope, OBE, 19th Baronet of Craighall, Chief of the Name and Arms of Hope, Chief of Clan Hope. The chiefly line of the Hope family survives through the Baronets of Craighall who are the senior line of the Clan Hope.

== Clan castles ==
The seat of Hope baronets of Craighall was moved from Craighall Castle in Fife to Pinkie House in Musselburgh, East Lothian, Scotland. Originally built in the 16th century, Pinkie House was acquired by Sir Archibald Hope, 9th Baronet of Craighall, in 1778, until sold in 1951.

Hopetoun House is the seat of the junior branch of the Clan Hope who were Earls of Hopetoun and since 1902 have been Marquesses of Linlithgow.

== See also ==
- Scottish clan
- Marquess of Linlithgow
