= Sir John Hope, 11th Baronet =

Scottish aristocrat and politician

Sir John Hope, 11th Baronet (13 April 1781 – 5 June 1853) was a Scottish aristocrat and politician.

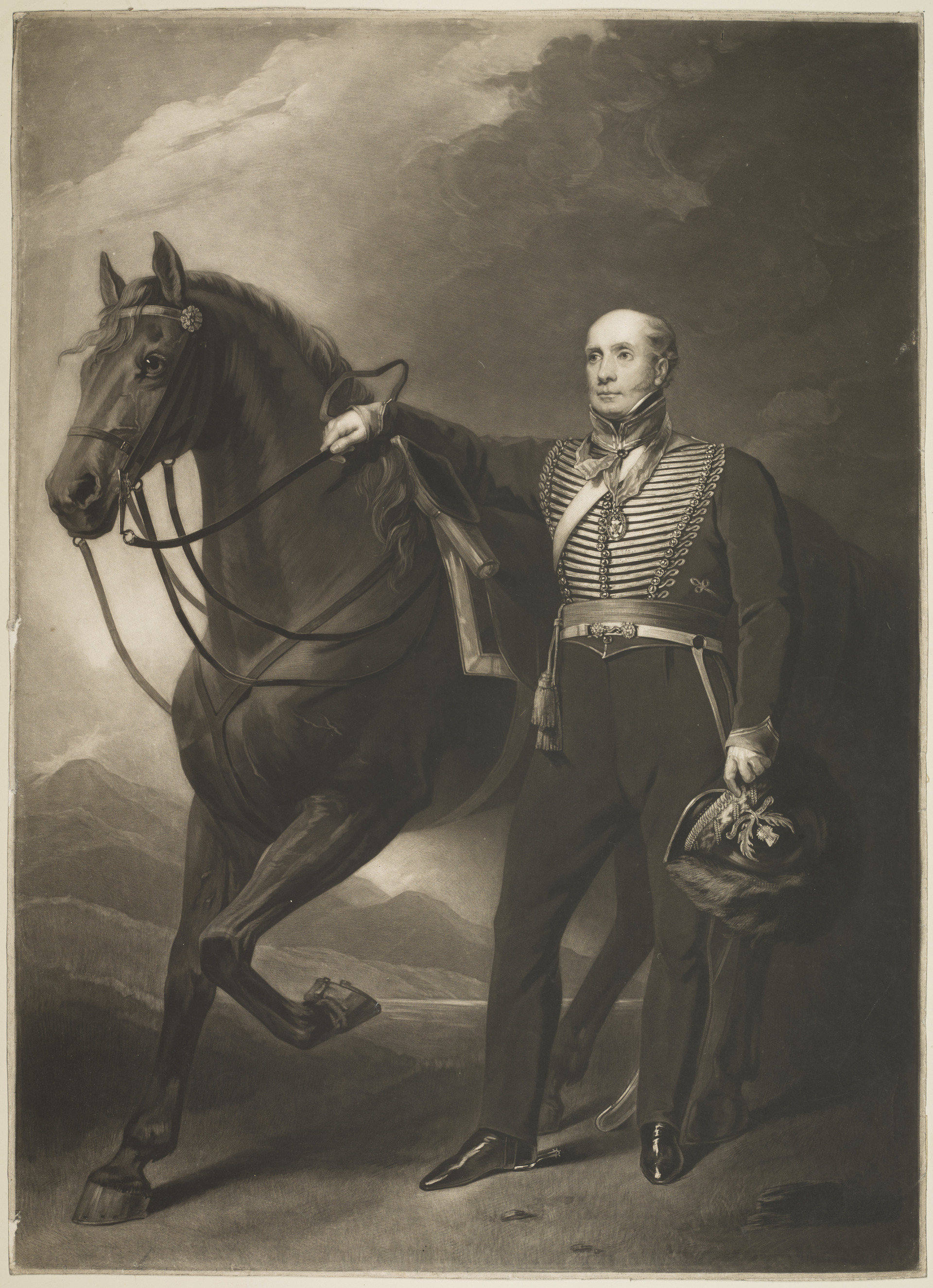
Sir John Hope, of Craighall, by Thomas Hodgetts, National Galleries Scotland

== Life ==
Sir John was born at Pinkie House on 13 April 1781, the oldest son of Sir Archibald Hope, 9th Baronet and his second wife, Elizabeth Patoun (d. 1818), the daughter of John Patoun of Inveresk. He succeeded to the baronetcy on the death of his unmarried half-brother, Sir Thomas Hope, 10th Baronet. The Hope Baronetcy of Craighall in the County of Fife, was created in the Baronetage of Nova Scotia on 19 February 1628 for Thomas Hope, a Scottish lawyer and advisor to Charles I.

Sir John was first elected as a Conservative Member of Parliament for Midlothian in June 1845 upon the retirement of William Ramsay Ramsay, Esq. He was re-elected without opposition in 1847 and 1852. He was also a Vice-Lieutenant for the county.

Additionally, Sir John was a Lieutenant-Colonel Commandant in the Royal Midlothian Yeomanry Cavalry and a Deputy-Governor of the Royal Bank of Scotland.

== Family ==
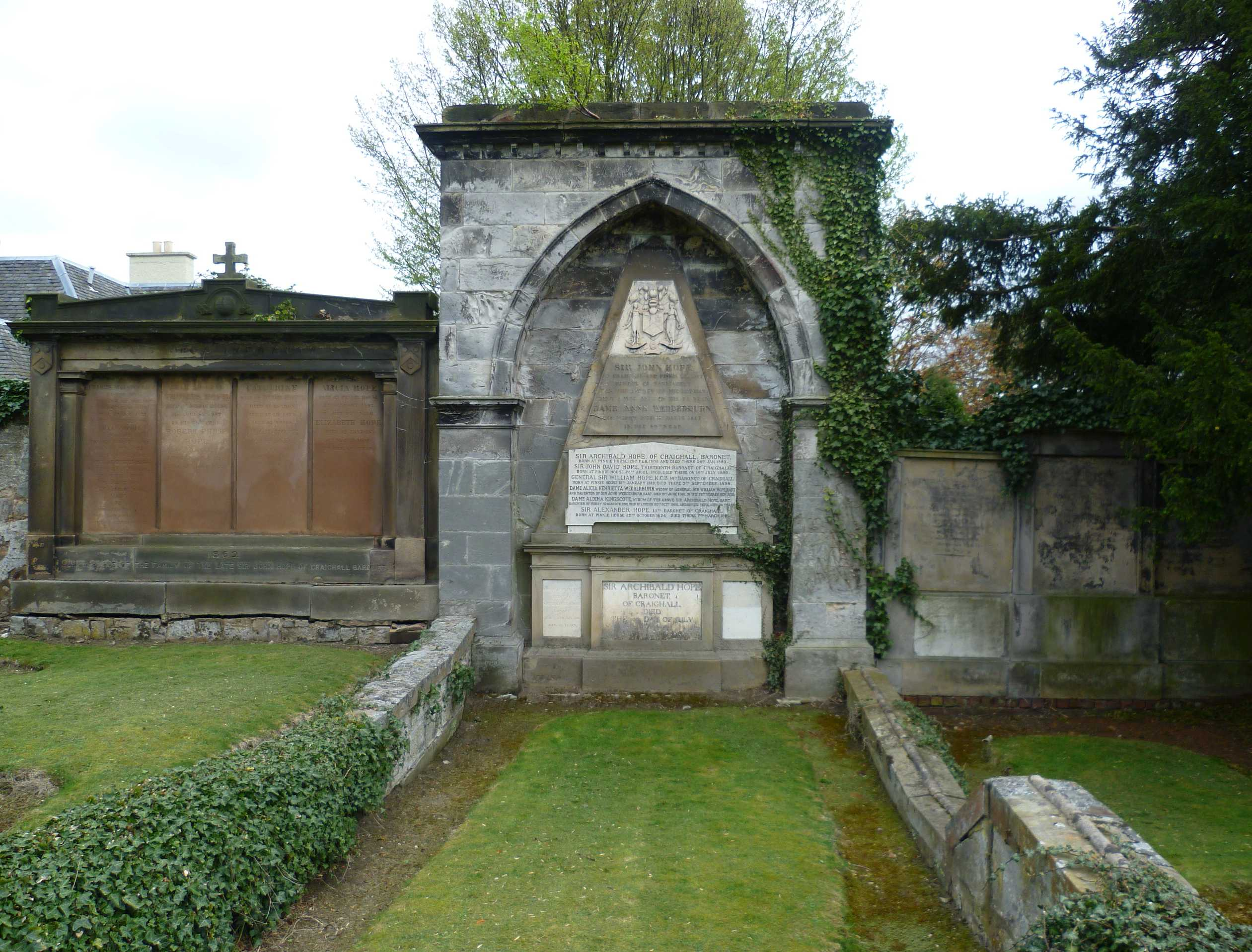
General Sir William Hope's Grave, Inveresk Parish Kirkyard

Sir John married Anne, 4th daughter of Sir John Wedderburn, 6th Baronet of Blackness and Ballindean, on 17 June 1805 and had the following children:

- Sir Archibald Hope, 12th Baronet
- Sir John David Hope, 13th Baronet
- Thomas Hope, b. 10 July 1810, Rear Admiral Royal Navy, d. 31 August 1867
- Hugh Hope, b. 3 June 1813 and d. 15 August 1876
- General Sir William Hope, 14th Baronet
- James Wedderburn Hope, b. 4 September 1823, 26th Bombay Native Infantry, d. 9 June 1846
- Sir Alexander Hope, 15th Baronet
- Rev. Charles Augustus Hope, M.A., Rector of Barwick-in-Elmet and Honorary Canon of Ripon Cathedral, b. 7 August 1827 and d. 30 December 1898; father of Sir John Augustus Hope, 16th Baronet
- Alicia, d. unmarried 29 January 1887
- Elizabeth, d. unmarried 4 March 1890

Sir John died on at his son Hugh's Hyde Park residence. Sir John and his wife are buried in the Hope Baronets plot at St. Michael's Parish Church, Inveresk, Scotland. An adjacent plot holds the graves of many of Sir John's family.

Parliament of the United Kingdom
Preceded by William Ramsay Ramsay	Member of Parliament for Midlothian; 1845–1853	Succeeded by William Montagu Douglas Scott, 6th Duke of Buccleuch
Baronetage of Nova Scotia
Preceded by Thomas Hope	Baronet (of Craighall); 1801–1853	Succeeded by Archibald Hope
