= Sir Thomas Hope, 8th Baronet =

Scottish aristocrat and agricultural reformer, died 1771

Sir Thomas Hope, 8th Baronet (1681–17 April 1771) was a Scottish aristocrat, lawyer and agricultural reformer.

== Life ==
Hope was born in 1681 at Rankeillor House near Monimail in Fife. He was the son of Margaret, the daughter of Sir John Aytoun of Aytoun and Sir Archibald Hope, Lord Rankeillor. His grandfather was Sir John Hope, Lord Craighall, 2nd Baronet Hope of Craighall. The Hope baronetcy of Craighall in the county of Fife was created in the Baronetage of Nova Scotia on 19 February 1628 for Thomas Hope, a Scottish lawyer, and advisor to Charles I.

Like his ancestors, Hope studied the law. He was admitted as an advocate 8 July 1701 and served as an MP for Fifeshire from 1706 to 1707. He opposed the Treaty of Union 1707 and left politics at that point. In 1723 he founded the Society of Improvers in the Knowledge of Agriculture. He served as the first president of this society with Robert Maxwell of Arkland as its secretary.

In 1741 Hope engaged in correspondence with James Erskine, Lord Grange, with a view to ending the incarceration on the island of Hirta of his wife, Rachel Chiesley, Lady Grange, proposing that she be allowed to live with relatives in Aberdeenshire. His efforts were unsuccessful.

Hope succeeded to the baronetcy on 5 June 1766 on the death of his cousin Lieutenant-General Sir John Bruce Hope, 7th Baronet (c. 1684 – 5 June 1766).

He was an early promoter of agricultural improvement and land improvement. One of his ambitious projects was the draining of the Borough Loch and adjacent marshy land south of Edinburgh which was then put to use as common grazing land. Today that area is known as The Meadows, but historically was often referred to as Hope Park. He built a villa, Hope House, in 1770 on the east side of the reclaimed land.

Sir Thomas died 17 April 1771 and was succeeded in the baronetcy by his grandson, Sir Archibald Hope, 9th Baronet.

== Family ==
Sir Thomas married Margaret Lowis, the eldest daughter of James Lowis of Merchiston on 16 March 1702. The couple had the following children:

- Archibald, married Catherine Todd, eldest daughter of Hugh Todd. Died young and the baronetcy passed to his son, Sir Archibald Hope, 9th Baronet
- James, of London, merchant, governor of Cape Coast Castle
- Thomas, physician to the English factory at Cartagena
- John, a merchant, married Isabel, daughter of Sir Alexander Bannerman, Bannerman Baronet of Elsick
- Charles, a captain of marines, died unmarried
- Margaret, died unmarried
- Agnes, died unmarried
- Helen, died unmarried

Baronetage of Nova Scotia
Preceded by John Bruce Hope	Baronet (of Craighall); 1766–1771	Succeeded by Archibald Hope
