= Archibald Hope =

Archibald Hope may refer to:

- Archibald Hope, Lord Rankeillor (1639–1706), Scottish advocate and judge
- Sir Archibald Hope, 9th Baronet (1735–1794), Scottish aristocrat
- Sir Archibald Hope, 17th Baronet (1912–1987), Scottish WWII aviator
