= Hugh Hope =

Engliash civil servant and painting subject (1782–1822)

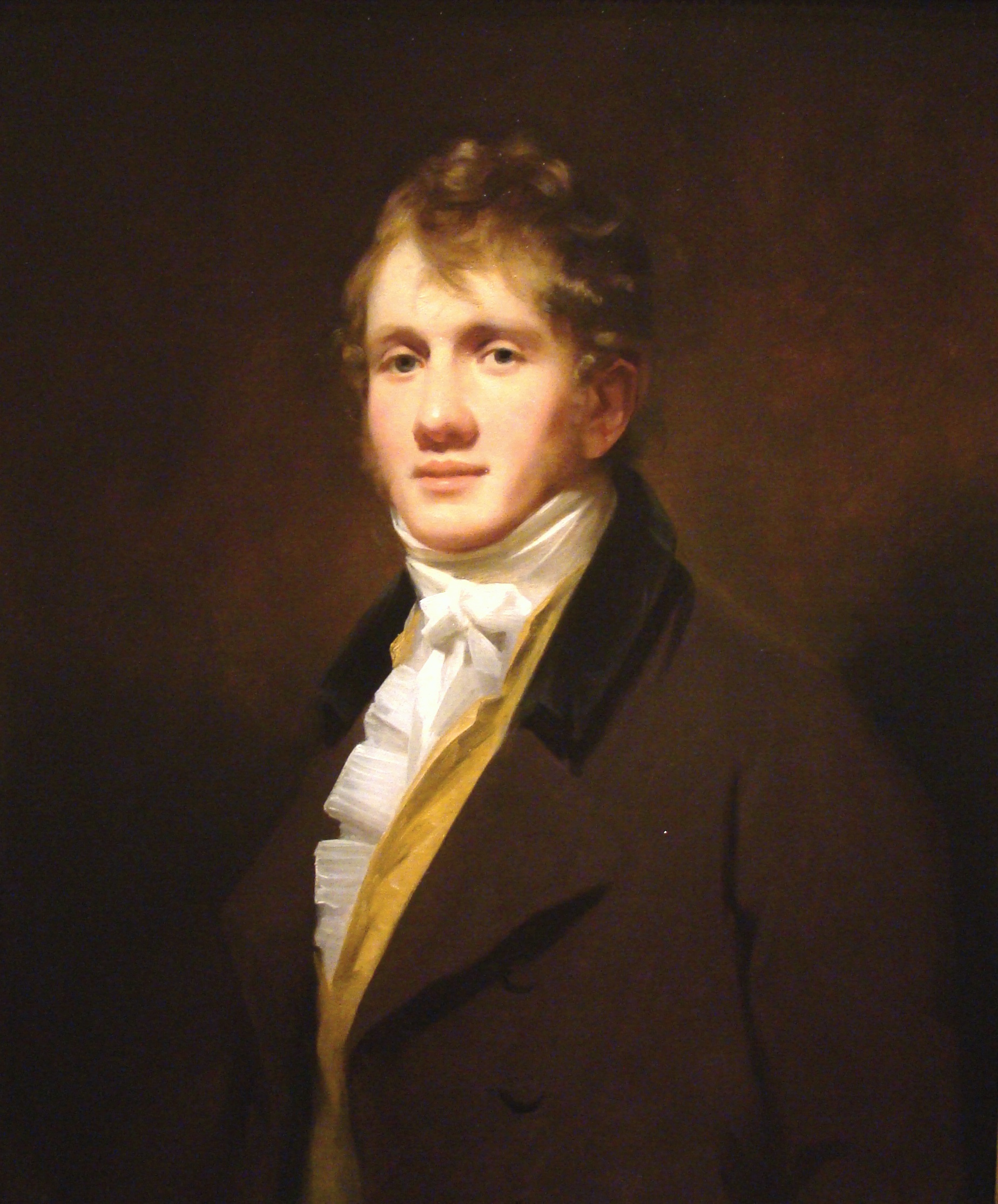
- Artist: Sir Henry Raeburn
- Year: c. 1810
- Medium: Oil on canvas
- Dimensions: 94.5 cm × 82 cm (37 3/16 in × 32 1/4 in)
- Location: The Cleveland Museum of Art, Cleveland, Ohio
- Website: https://www.clevelandart.org/art/1991.133

Hugh Hope (1782–1822) was a civil servant for the East India Company and the third son of Sir Archibald Hope, 9th Baronet Hope of Craighall. A portrait of Hugh Hope, painted by Sir Henry Raeburn (1756–1823), currently hangs in The Cleveland Museum of Art.

== Painting by Raeburn ==
Commissioned by the subject's family, Sir Henry Raeburn painted his portrait of Hugh Hope around 1810.

An 1889 Scottish Art Review described the painting as follows:

To our left of the portrait of Sir Thomas Hope hangs another admirable family picture, which indeed may rank as the most accomplished piece of art that Pinkie contains. This is a bust portrait of Hugh Hope (b. 1782, d. 1822), of the East India Company's Service, second son of the ninth Baronet, by his second wife. It is the work of Raeburn, and a masterly example of that painter, showing - in every touch that expresses the fair hair, the blue eyes, the full, fresh-coloured face and in the details of the crisp white ruffles, the dark brown coat, the yellow vest - that easy power of swift, unlaboured, expressive brush-work, for which Sir Henry is unrivalled among Scottish painters.

The painting hung for over a hundred years at Pinkie House, the Hope family estate near Musselburgh, East Lothian, Scotland, until 1928 when it was included in a Sotheby's London art auction. The painting sold at that time for £4,100 to Messrs. Knaedler. The painting was displayed at the Fogg Museum in 1930 as part of an exhibition of eighteenth and early nineteenth century English artists. The painting is currently part of the British Painting and Decorative Art collection of The Cleveland Museum of Art, a gift of Jane Taft Ingalls on the occasion of the Museum's Seventy-Fifth Anniversary in 1995.

== About the subject ==
Hugh Hope was the second son of Sir Archibald Hope, 9th Baronet Hope of Craighall and his second wife, Elizabeth Patoun, the daughter of John Patoun, Esq. of Inveresk. Sir Archibald purchased the estate of Pinkie House in 1778 from the Marquis of Tweeddale and established it as the seat of Hope baronetcy from its historic location of Craighall in Fife. In 1779 Hope's parents married after Sir Archibald's first wife died. The couple had three sons and a daughter, including Hugh Hope born in on 12 October 1782. The family also included two sons and four daughters from Sir Archibald's first marriage.

After attending a foreign university, in 1803 Hugh Hope went to India as a civil servant with the East India Company.

In 1819 Hugh Hope married Isabella Gray MacKay, the daughter of Æneas Mackay, Esq. of Scotston, Aberdeenshire. The couple were parents of one daughter, Helen Hope, and one son, Archibald Hugh Hope, later a General in the Madras Cavalry.

Hugh Hope died of a fever on 7 October 1822 in Mirzapur, India. At the time of his death, he was the Collector of Government Customs at Mirzapur.
