= Archibald Hope, Lord Rankeillor =

The Right Honourable Lord Rankeillor Archibald Hope, Lord Rankeillor

Lord of Session
- Incumbent
- Assumed office 1 November 1689

Commissioner of Justiciary
- Incumbent
- Assumed office 27 January 1690

MP of Fifeshire
- In office 25 April 1706 – 10 October 1706

Personal details
- Born: 1639
- Died: 10 October 1706 (aged 66–67)
- Spouse(s): Margaret Atyoun, daughter of Sir John Aytoun, of that Ilk
- Children: John Hope, Thomas Hope, Charles Hope, David Hope, Robert Hope, Margaret Hope, Bethia Hope, Ann Hope, Helen Hope
- Profession: Advocate

Sir Archibald Hope, Lord Rankeillor (1639 – 10 October 1706) was a Scottish advocate and judge, the second son of John Hope, Lord Craighall, the grandfather of the botanist John Hope and the great-grandfather of the chemist Thomas Charles Hope, FRSE.

== Early life ==
Archibald Hope was the second son of Sir John Hope, Lord Craighall, 2nd Baronet Hope of Craighall and Margaret Murray, daughter of Sir Archibald Murray of Blackbarony. He was the grandson of Sir Thomas Hope, 1st Baronet Hope of Craighall.

== Legal career ==
Like his father and grandfather before him, Archibald Hope pursued a law career. He was admitted an advocate on 30 June 1664 and readmitted on 8 January 1676. He became a Lord of Session, assuming the name of Lord Rankeillor, on 1 November 1689, followed by Lord of Justiciary on 27 January 1690. A knighthood by King William followed shortly thereafter.

== Family ==
Sir Archibald Hope had the following children:

- John, died unmarried, predeceasing his father
- Sir Thomas Hope, 8th Baronet, Hope of Craighall, succeeded in 1766 upon the death of Sir John Bruce-Hope, the 7th Baronet.
- Charles of Edinburgh married the eldest daughter of Thomas Boyd
- David, died unmarried
- Robert was a surgeon and was the father of the botanist, John Hope and grandfather of the chemist, Thomas Charles Hope, FRSE.
- Margaret, married Patrick Scott of Rossie, whose descendants include David Scott of Dunninald
- Bethia, married firstly Ninian Lewis or Lowis, secondly Sir William Nairne, 2nd Baronet Nairne of Dunsinane
- Ann, married Alexander Stevenson, W.S. of Montgreenan
- Helen, married Patrick Butter, Esq. of Gormack

The later Lords Rankeillour do not descend from Sir Archibald but from a junior branch of Clan Hope descended from the 6th son of the 1st Baronet and now headed by the Marquess of Linlithgow.

== See also ==
- Clan Hope
- Hope Baronets of Craighall
