= Jane Gomeldon =

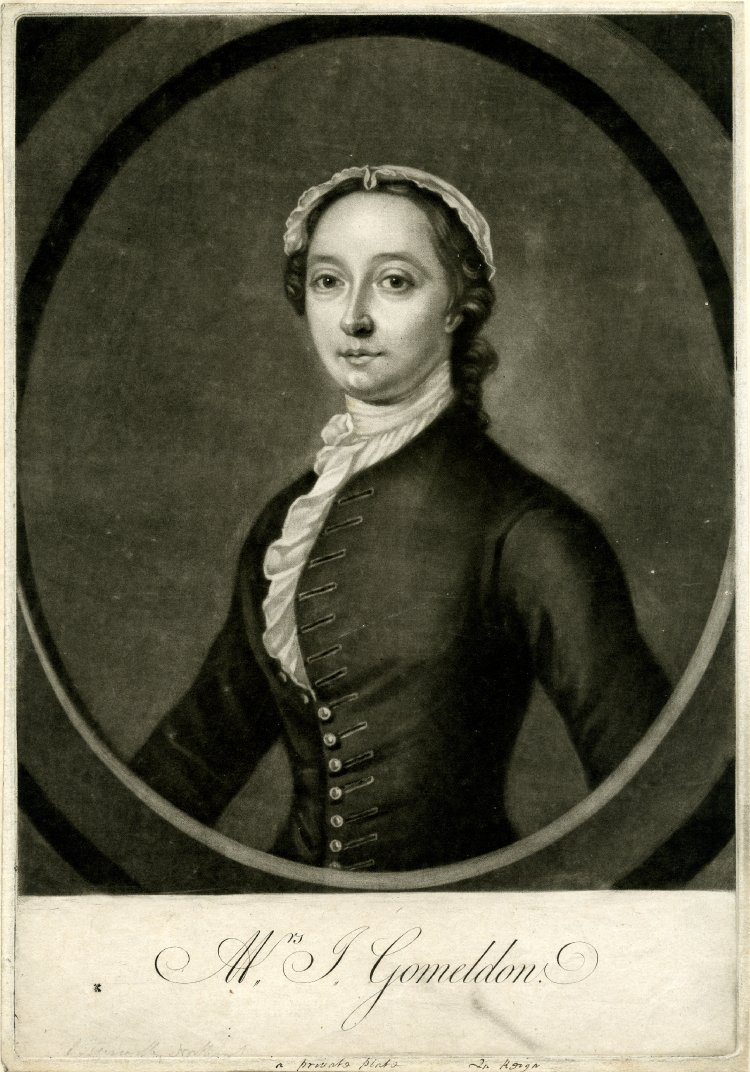
- Born: Jane Middleton c. 1720; Newcastle upon Tyne, England
- Died: 10 July 1779 (aged 58–59)
- Occupations: writer, poet, adventurer
- Spouse: Captain Francis Gomeldon

Jane Gomeldon (née Jane Middleton; c. 1720 – 10 July 1779) was an English writer, poet and adventurer. Her writing has gained her posthumous recognition as an early feminist.

== Biography ==
Jane Middleton was born in the Newcastle area, the daughter of a Quaker family of glassmakers. She was well-educated in philosophy, science, and languages. At a young age, she married Captain Francis Gomeldon, an officer in Sir John Bruce Hope's Regiment of Foot, and a friend of George Bowes, the coal proprietor.

Soon after her marriage, she fled to France and proceeded to have many adventures, disguised as a man. One such adventure included paying court to a young nun whom she almost persuaded to elope with her. In 1740, her husband placed an advertisement in the Newcastle Journal announcing that she had left him and asking for her to return. Jane Gomeldon undertook an unusual response by placing her own advertisement in the rival newspaper, Newcastle Courant; explaining that she had left him due to his cruelty onto her joined with his intermeddling with the fortune that mother her had left and secured to Jane—for her sole and separate use. In 1742, she brought a separation suit to court, against her husband, on the grounds of cruelty.

Her husband died and his will was proved in February 1750/1. However, she was not a beneficiary of the will as he left all her property to his nephew, Thomas Lake.

She took an interest in the Lying-in Hospital, which was built in Rosemary Lane, Newcastle, in 1760 as an 'asylum for pregnant married women'. In March 1766, she wrote to William Cavendish-Bentinck, 3rd Duke of Portland, referring to the duke's position as the head of that charity, making proposals relating to the hospital and to making the charity more extensive. Her first book, published in the same year, was sold by subscription to raise money for this charity.

According to the Dictionary of National Biography, she fell in love with the name of Captain James Cook and wished to accompany him on his first voyage around the world. She seems to have been a cousin of Sydney Parkinson who was employed by Joseph Banks and who travelled on that voyage, although their exact relationship is uncertain. A letter from Gomeldon (addressed to Parkinson as "Dear Cousin") is published in the preface to the first published edition of Parkinson's journal. The letter, dated 29 January 1773 relates to an attempt to "suppress" the book by Dr. Hawkesworth (who was also publishing an account of the voyage) and who filed a bill in chancery against Parkinson, claiming that Parkinson had invaded his property by printing manuscripts and engraving designs, which he sold to Joseph Banks. Gomeldon's letter provided some evidence against this claim.

Jane Gomeldon died "at an advanced age" on 10 July 1779. Her death was reported in the Newcastle Courant.

== The Medley ==
Her first book, The Medley, was published for the benefit of the Lying-in Hospital—a charity for poor women. A number of prominent people subscribed to the book and it raised some £53. The work is written as a series of satirical essays, peopled by characters who are gently ridiculed by the author: they have names such as Lord and Lady Magnesia, Miss Clairvoyan and Lady Elizabeth Bizzare. As well as highlighting the pomposities and hypocrisies of the age, the book also tackles issues sometimes considered taboo, including female education, cross-dressing and female adultery.

The essays are written in the first person, from the point of view of a fictional male narrator. Gomeldon writes:

"I am Son to a Man, more rich than willing to part with his Money—and of a lady whose high Birth and genteel Accomplishments, inclined her much to lay out what Money she could..."

The narrator goes on to describe his (fictional) father:

"...not one of the Children resembled himself, and it was continually remarked, that one Child was like one Gentleman, another Child like another Gentleman: As for myself, I was reckoned like a whole Regiment; and what was very singular, this very Regiment had been quartered in our Neighbourood the Year I was born."

A recurring theme is the need for men to improve themselves to be fit companions for women. For example, in the first essay, Gomeldon writes:

"...Ladies at present value themselves upon more than merely knowing domestic life;—they exclude not themselves from any thing! and when one sees them thus accomplished, 'tis an additional spur to write for the gentlemen, to render them fit to be their companions!"

== Maxims ==
Her other major work was Maxims, published in 1779. This consists of 57 "maxims" or moral proverbs of her own devising; for example, maxim LVII:

"Praise is the Offspring of Esteem,
And Affection the Parent of Praise."

Some have a slightly harder satirical or radical edge, such as maxim LI:

"When the Nobles become dissolute, the
People in general grow licentious, and
Many of the Clergy lax, as a Number of
Benefices originate in corrupt Patrons."

== Other works ==
Jane Gomeldon wrote a poem entitled "Happiness", and addressed to "Dear, Faithful Ann". It was published by Isaac Thompson in 1773.
