= Governor Hope =

Governor Hope may refer to:

- Arthur Hope, 2nd Baron Rankeillour (1897–1958), Governor of Madras Presidency from 1940 to 1946
- John Bruce Hope (1680s–1766), Governor of Bermuda from 1721 to 1727
- Victor Hope, 2nd Marquess of Linlithgow (1887–1952), Governor-General and Viceroy of India from 1936 to 1943
