= Sir William Hope, 14th Baronet =

British Army general

General Sir William Hope Bt KCB
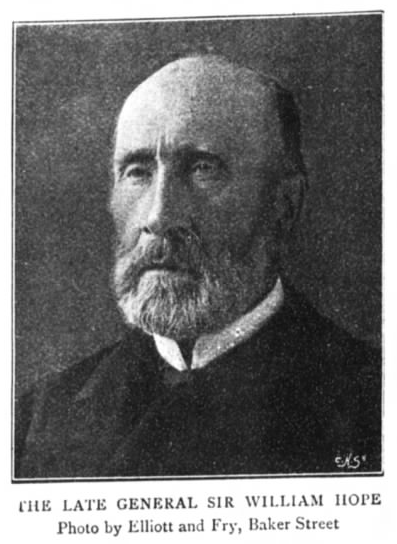
- Born: 12 January 1819
- Died: 5 September 1898 (aged 79); Pinkie House, Musselburgh
- Military career
- Allegiance: United Kingdom
- Branch: British Army
- Rank: General
- Commands: Commander-in-Chief, Scotland
- Conflicts: Crimean War; Indian Mutiny; Ambela Campaign
- Awards: Knight Commander of the Order of the Bath

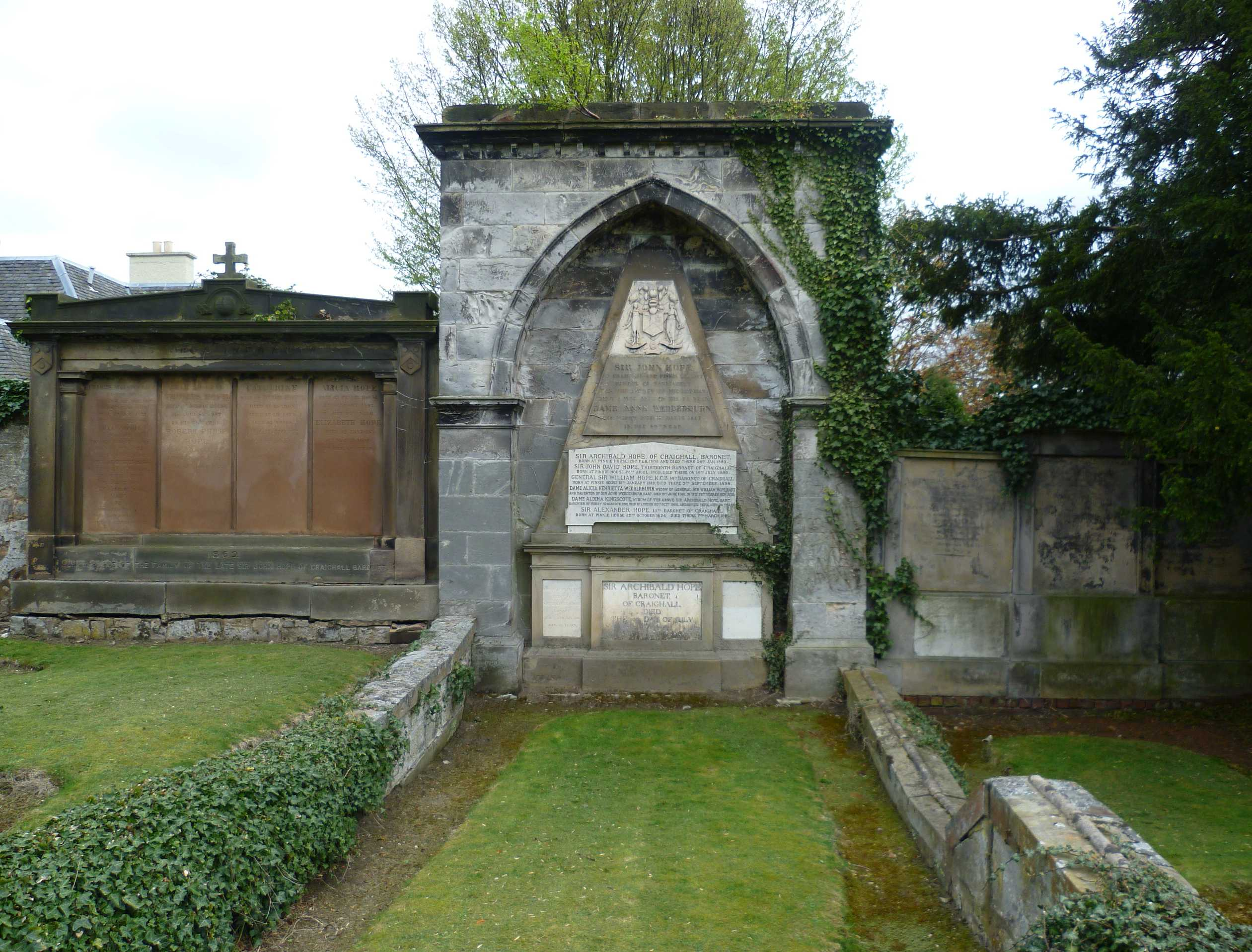
General Sir William Hope's Grave, Inveresk Parish Kirkyard

General Sir William Hope, 14th Baronet, KCB (12 January 1819 – 5 September 1898) was a British Army officer who became Commander-in-Chief, Scotland.

== Military career ==
Born the fifth son of Sir John Hope, 11th Baronet and Anne Wedderburn, daughter of Sir John Wedderburn of Ballindean, 6th Baronet of Blackness, Hope was commissioned into the British Army in 1835. He served with the 71st (Highland) Regiment of Foot at the Siege of Sebastopol in Winter 1854 during the Crimean War. He commanded a brigade at Rajghur in 1858 during the Indian Mutiny and commanded his regiment in operations at Euzofzie and at Crag Piquet in 1863 during the Ambela Campaign. Promoted to major-general in 1868, he went on to command the troops in the North British District from 1880 to 1881 and retired as a full general in 1891.

== Family ==
On 22 January 1862, Hope married a cousin, Alicia Henrietta Wedderburn, daughter of Sir John Wedderburn, 2nd Baronet. Dying without issue, Hope was succeeded by Sir Alexander Hope, 15th Baronet Hope of Craighall, J.P., of Kingston Grange, Liberton. Hope and his wife are buried in the Hope family plot at St. Michael's Parish Church, Inveresk, Scotland.

Military offices
Preceded by Robert Bruce	Commanding the troops in the North British District; 1880–1881	Succeeded by Alastair Macdonald
Baronetage of Nova Scotia
Preceded by John Hope	Baronet (of Craighall); 1892–1898	Succeeded by Alexander Hope
