= James Hope of Hopetoun =

Scottish lawyer, industrialist and politician

Sir James Hope of Hopetoun (1614–1661) was a Scottish lawyer, industrialist and politician.

== Life ==
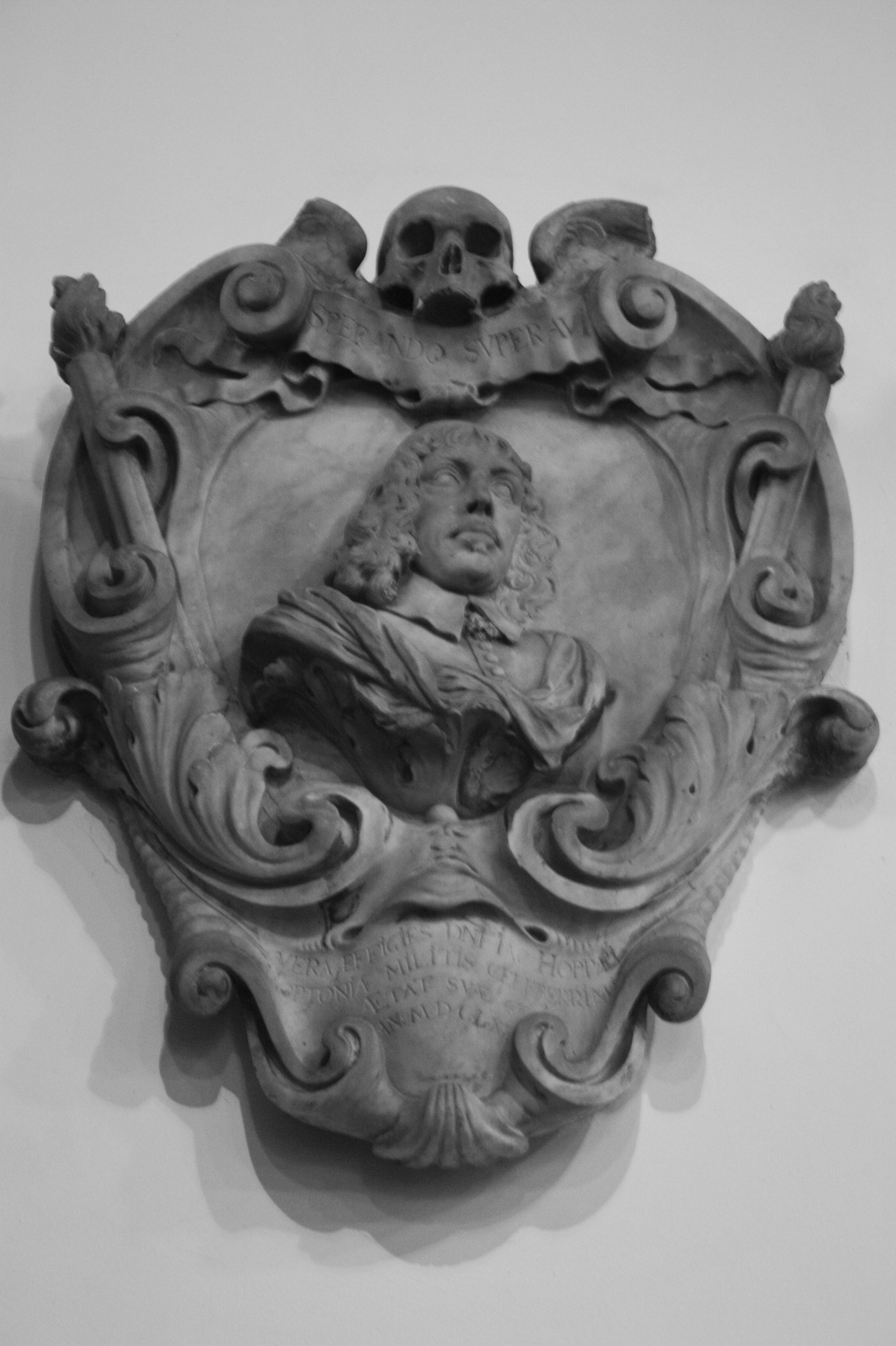
Memorial to James Hope of Hopetoun, Cramond Kirk

The sixth son of Sir Thomas Hope of Craighall, Fife, Scotland, by his wife Elizabeth, daughter of John Binning or Bennet of Wallyford, Haddingtonshire, he was born on 12 July 1614. From February 1636 to October 1637 he studied law in France. After his first marriage in 1638 he devoted himself to the working of the lead mines on his lands at Leadhills.

In 1642 Hope was appointed general of the cunzie-house, an office with both a civil and a criminal jurisdiction. On the death of his brother, Sir Thomas Hope of Kerse, a lord of session, on 23 August 1643, his friends made a vain attempt to get him named as successor, the enactment of the Act of Classes, disqualifying from office anyone directly or indirectly accessory to the "Engagement" with England.

In January 1646, Hope went to London and borrowed money from Robert Inglis and his Dutch agent, Anthonis Tierens, for a study trip abroad to research mineral technologies. On 16 April 1646 he was at The Hague and saw Elizabeth of Bohemia, her three daughters, and her youngest son at supper. He brought letters from Dr James Primrose to one of the Princess Royal's courtiers, and visited the Huis Honselaarsdijk and the Huis ter Nieuwburg at Rijswijk.

On 1 June 1649 he was chosen an ordinary lord of session. In this year and also in 1650 he sat in parliament as commissioner for the county of Stirling. He was also one of the committee of estates, and a commissioner both of public accounts and for the revision of the laws.

Hope was one of those sent to take any statement from Montrose on his arrival as a prisoner in Edinburgh. On 20 May 1650 he was appointed president of the committee for the examining of prisoners taken during the civil war. When the Scottish people, after the execution of Charles I, were set on restoring the monarchy, Hope suggested a compromise. He voted at Perth on 20 June 1650 against levying an army to resist the advance of Oliver Cromwell, and was denounced by Argyll. On 7 January 1651 he was refused a passport to leave the country. For inciting his brother, Sir Alexander Hope, to suggest to Charles II the advisability of surrendering England, Ireland, and even a part of Scotland to Cromwell to save the rest, he was shortly afterwards sent to prison, but on 20 January was ordered to confine himself within his country estate.

The victory of Cromwell freed Hope, and in 1652 he was appointed one of the commissioners for the administration of justice in Scotland. On 14 June 1653 he joined the English Council of State, and served on important committees. He represented Scotland in the parliament of 1653. In 1654 he was made a commissioner for the sale of forfeited estates, but in July of the same year he was omitted in the new commission of justice, because his conduct at the dissolution of Barebone's Parliament had displeased Cromwell.

Hope was reappointed in March 1660. On a visit to Holland in the following year, in connection with his lead business, he caught "Flanders fever", of which he died, two days after landing in Scotland, at his brother's house of Granton, on 23 November 1661. He was buried in the church of Cramond in the north west of Edinburgh. A monument was erected to his memory with the inscription Sperando superavi. Vera effigies Dni. Jac. Hoppæi Hoptoniæ militis celeberrimi ætat. suæ 47, a.d. 1661.

== Entrepreneur ==
James Hope's diary reveals his keen interest in minerals, metallurgy and manufacture, and much of his income derived from the Leadhill lead mines which came with his wife's property. James was asked to mediate between the Edinburgh guilds of Goldsmiths and lacemakers over the use of silver. In August 1647 he became involved in a plan to set up a glassworks at Prestonpans proposed by the Italian portrait painter Isaac Visitella and his brothers Cornelius and Christopher. This project was not successful. Hope argued that the projected production would exceed demand. Hope presented the exiled Charles II with a nugget of Scottish gold and met him at Falkland Palace in July 1651. Hope was interested in gypsum plaster which was found in Maxwellhaugh near Kelso.

== Family ==
By his first wife Anna, daughter and heiress of Robert Foulis of Leadhills, Lanarkshire, he had seven sons and four daughters. His second wife was Lady Mary, eldest daughter and one of the coheiresses of William Keith, 7th Earl Marischal, by whom he had two sons and a daughter. His widow afterwards married Sir Archibald Murray of Blackbarony, 3rd Baronet.

Hope was succeeded by his oldest surviving son, John, who lost his life by the wreck of HMS Gloucester in 1682. His grandson, Charles, became the 1st Earl of Hopetoun.
