= John Hope, Lord Craighall =

Scottish judge

Sir John Hope, 2nd Baronet, Lord Craighall (1605? – 27 April 1654) was a Scottish judge.

== Life ==
Born about 1605, he was eldest son of Sir Thomas Hope of Craighall, 1st Baronet, by Elizabeth, daughter of John Bennet of Wallyford in Haddingtonshire; Sir James Hope (1614–1661) of Hopetoun, was his younger brother. In 1619 the family acquired and moved to Granton Castle just north-west of Edinburgh.

He was educated for the law, and having been admitted advocate acquired a practice, and in 1632 was knighted and appointed an ordinary lord of session. He assumed the title of Lord Craighall, and took his seat on 27 July.

In September 1638 Hope refused to subscribe the king's covenant until it had been approved by the General Assembly. In 1640 he was placed on the committee of estates appointed to provide for the defence of the kingdom against Charles I; was reappointed ordinary lord of session in the following year; and in 1644 was made one of the commissioners for the visitation of St. Andrews, the plantation of kirks, the administration of the exchequer and the excise.

In 1646 his father died and he became the 2nd Hope baronet of Craighall and inherited Granton Castle and its estates.

In 1651 his brother, Sir Alexander Hope, underwent examination by the committee of estates for advising the king to surrender Scotland and Ireland to Oliver Cromwell, and quoted Lord Craighall to the effect that it would be wise in the king to "treat with Cromwell for one-half of his coat before he lost the whole". In May 1652 Craighall was appointed one of Cromwell's committee, consisting of five English and three Scottish judges, for the administration of justice.

Hope died at Edinburgh on 28 April 1654, and is buried in Ceres Cemetery in Ceres, Fife, Scotland.

== Family ==
Hope firstly married Margaret, daughter of Sir Archibald Murray of Blackbarony, Bart., After her death in childbirth on 3 October 1641, Hope married Dame Rachel Speir, Lady Currichill, on 7 December 1643.

By his first wife, Hope had two sons and six daughters. The elder son, Thomas, born on 11 February 1633, was grandfather of Sir John Hope Bruce, 7th baronet, with whom his line became extinct. The second son, Archibald Hope (1639–1706), was Lord of Session in 1689, and Lord of Justiciary in 1690. He took the title of Lord Rankeillor, and was M.P. for Fifeshire from 25 April 1706 till his death on 10 October that year. The baronetcy continued through his line when Sir Thomas Hope, 8th Baronet assumed the baronetcy on the death of his cousin, Sir John Hope Bruce, 7th Baronet.

John Hope the botanist was his grandson.

Baronetage of Nova Scotia
Preceded by Thomas Hope	Baronet (of Craighall); 1646–1654	Succeeded by Thomas Hope
