= Hope baronets =

Extinct baronetcy in the Baronetage of the United Kingdom

Arms of the Chief of Clan Hope, the Hope Baronet of Craighall: Azure, a chevron or between three bezants

There have been four baronetcies created for persons with the surname Hope, three in the Baronetage of Nova Scotia and one in the Baronetage of the United Kingdom. As of 2010 two creation are extant, one extinct and one sold.

The Hope Baronetcy, of Craighall in the County of Fife, created in the Baronetage of Nova Scotia on 19 February 1628 for Thomas Hope, the Scottish advocate and advisor to Charles I. The sixth Baronet assumed the additional surname of Bruce, a surname also held by the seventh Baronet. The latter sat as Member of Parliament for Kinross. The eleventh Baronet was Conservative Member of Parliament for Midlothian. The sixteenth Baronet sat as Member of Parliament for Midlothian and Midlothian and Peebles North. The present Baronet is Chief of Clan Hope.

Charles Hope, 1st Earl of Hopetoun, ancestor of the Marquesses of Linlithgow, was the grandson of Sir James Hope, sixth son the first Baronet of Craighall. Sir Archibald Hope, second son of the second Baronet, was a Lord of Session as Lord Rankeillour. His grandson John Hope was a surgeon and botanist. John Edward Hope, great-grandson of Captain Robert Hope, grandson of Sir Archibald Hope, Lord Rankeillour, was a Major-General in the British Army. Archibald Hugh Hope, son of Hugh Hope, fourth son of the ninth Baronet, was a Major-General in the British Army.

The Hope Baronetcy, of Kerse in the County of Stirling, was created in the Baronetage of Nova Scotia on 30 May 1672 for Alexander Hope. The fourth baronet sold his noble inheritance to Sir Lawrence Dundas, 1st Baronet.

The Hope Baronetcy, of Kirkliston, was created in the Baronetage of Nova Scotia on 1 March 1698 for William Hope. The title became dormant on the death of the third Baronet in 1763. According to some sources John Hope, 2nd Earl of Hopetoun, succeeded to the title.

The Hope Baronetcy, of Kinnettles in the County of Angus, was created in the Baronetage of the United Kingdom on 13 January 1932 for the Scottish Unionist politician Harry Hope. The presumed third Baronet never successfully proved his succession and was never on the Official Roll of the Baronetage. The title became extinct on his death in 1993.

== Hope baronets, of Craighall (1628) ==
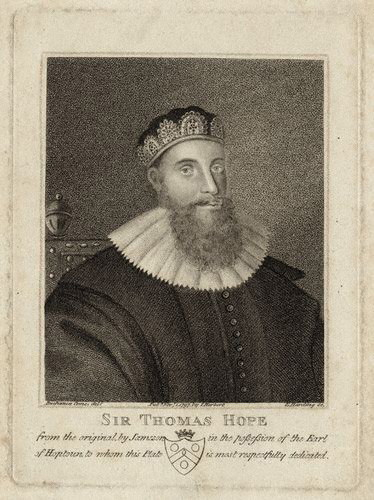
Sir Thomas Hope, 1st Baronet Hope of Craighall

- Sir Thomas Hope, 1st Baronet (died 1646)
- Sir John Hope, 2nd Baronet, Lord Craighall (c. 1605–1654)
- Sir Thomas Hope, 3rd Baronet (1633–1659)
- Sir Thomas Hope, 4th Baronet (died c. 1686)
- Sir William Hope, 5th Baronet (died c. 1707)
- Sir Thomas Bruce-Hope, 6th Baronet (died 1729)
- Sir John Bruce-Hope, 7th Baronet (c. 1684–1766)
- Sir Thomas Hope, 8th Baronet, (1681–1771)
- Sir Archibald Hope, 9th Baronet (1735–1794)
- Sir Thomas Hope, 10th Baronet (1768–1801)
- Sir John Hope, 11th Baronet (1781–1853)
- Sir Archibald Hope, 12th Baronet (1808–1883)
- Sir John David Hope, 13th Baronet (1809–1892)
- General Sir William Hope, 14th Baronet (1819–1898)
- Sir Alexander Hope, 15th Baronet (1824–1918)
- Sir John Augustus Hope, 16th Baronet (1869–1924)
- Sir Archibald Philip Hope, 17th Baronet (1912–1987)
- Sir John Carl Alexander Hope, 18th Baronet (1939–2007)
- Sir Alexander Archibald Douglas Hope, 19th Baronet (born 1969)

The heir apparent is the present holder's son Will Hope (born 2004).

== Hope baronets, of Kerse (1672) ==
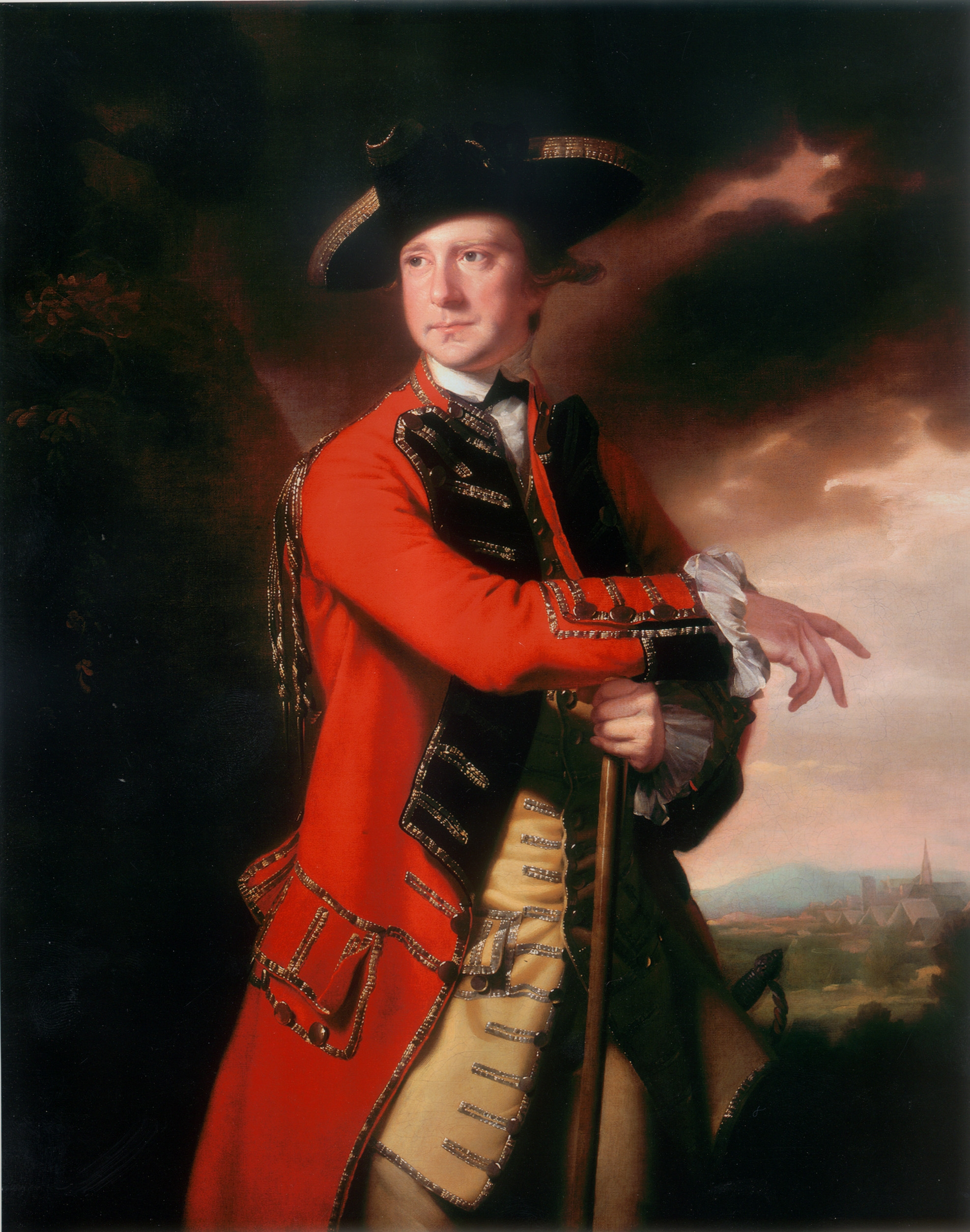
Sir Alexander Hope, 4th and last Baronet, of Kerse

- Sir Alexander Hope, 1st Baronet (1637–1673)
- Sir Alexander Hope, 2nd Baronet (1663–1719)
- Sir Alexander Hope, 3rd Baronet (1697–1749)
- Sir Alexander Hope, 4th Baronet (1728–1794)

== Hope baronets, of Kirkliston (1698) ==
- Sir William Hope, 1st Baronet (1660–1724)
- Sir George Hope, 2nd Baronet (c. 1685–1729)
- Sir William Hope, 3rd Baronet (c. 1726–1763)

Dormant on his death. Successfully claimed in 1989 by:

- Adrian Hope, 4th Marquess of Linlithgow, 12th Baronet (b 1946) -

== Hope baronets, of Kinnettles (1932) ==
Arms of Hope of Kinnettles: Azure, a chevron between two bezants in chief and the sun in his splendour in base or.

- Sir Harry Hope, 1st Baronet (1865–1959)
- Sir James Hope, 2nd Baronet (1898–1979)
- Robert Holms-Kerr Hope, presumed 3rd Baronet (1900–1993)

== See also ==
- Marquess of Linlithgow
- Baron Glendevon
- Baron Rankeillour
- Hope-Dunbar baronets
