= John Hope (botanist) =

Scottish physician and botanist (1725–1786)

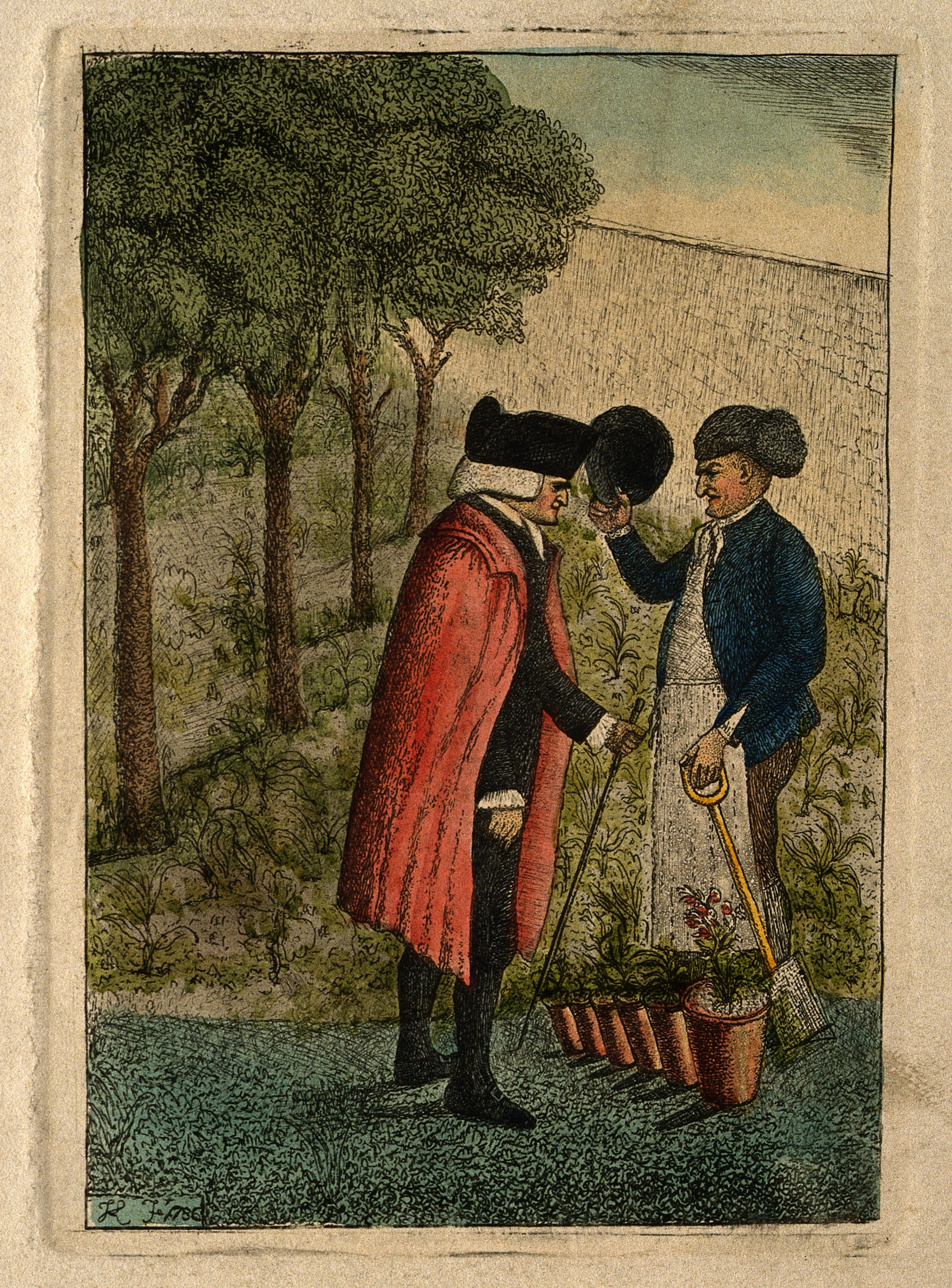
- Born: 10 May 1725; Edinburgh
- Died: 10 November 1786 (aged 61); Edinburgh
- Education: University of Edinburgh; University of Paris
- Children: Robert Hope, Marianne Hope, John Hope, Thomas Charles Hope, James Hope
- Scientific career
- Fields: Botany, medicine
- Workplaces: President, Royal College of Physicians of Edinburgh (1784-1786); King's Botanist (1761-86); Professor of Botany, University of Edinburgh
- Author abbrev. (botany): Hope

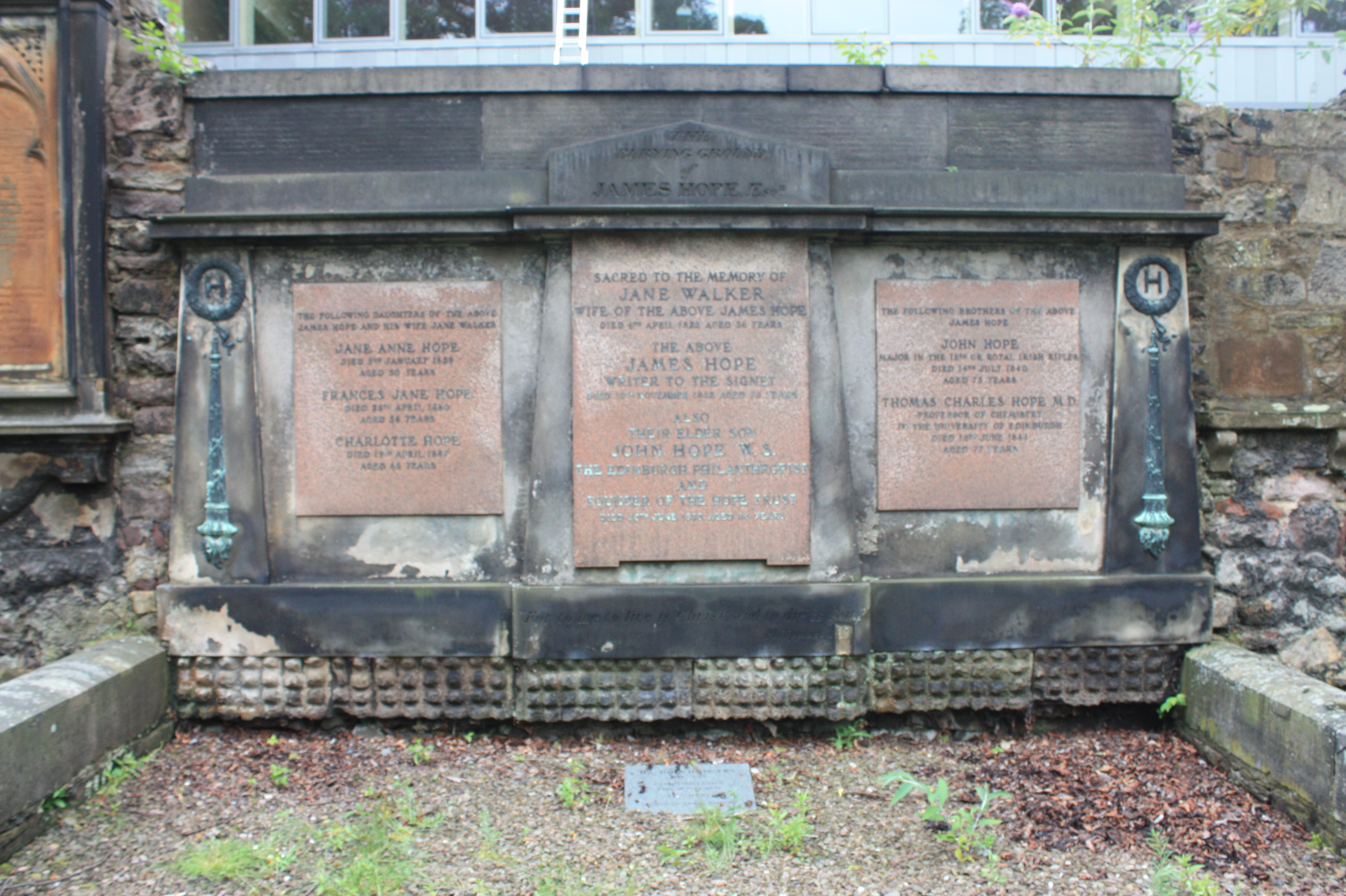
The Hope grave, Greyfriars Kirkyard, Edinburgh

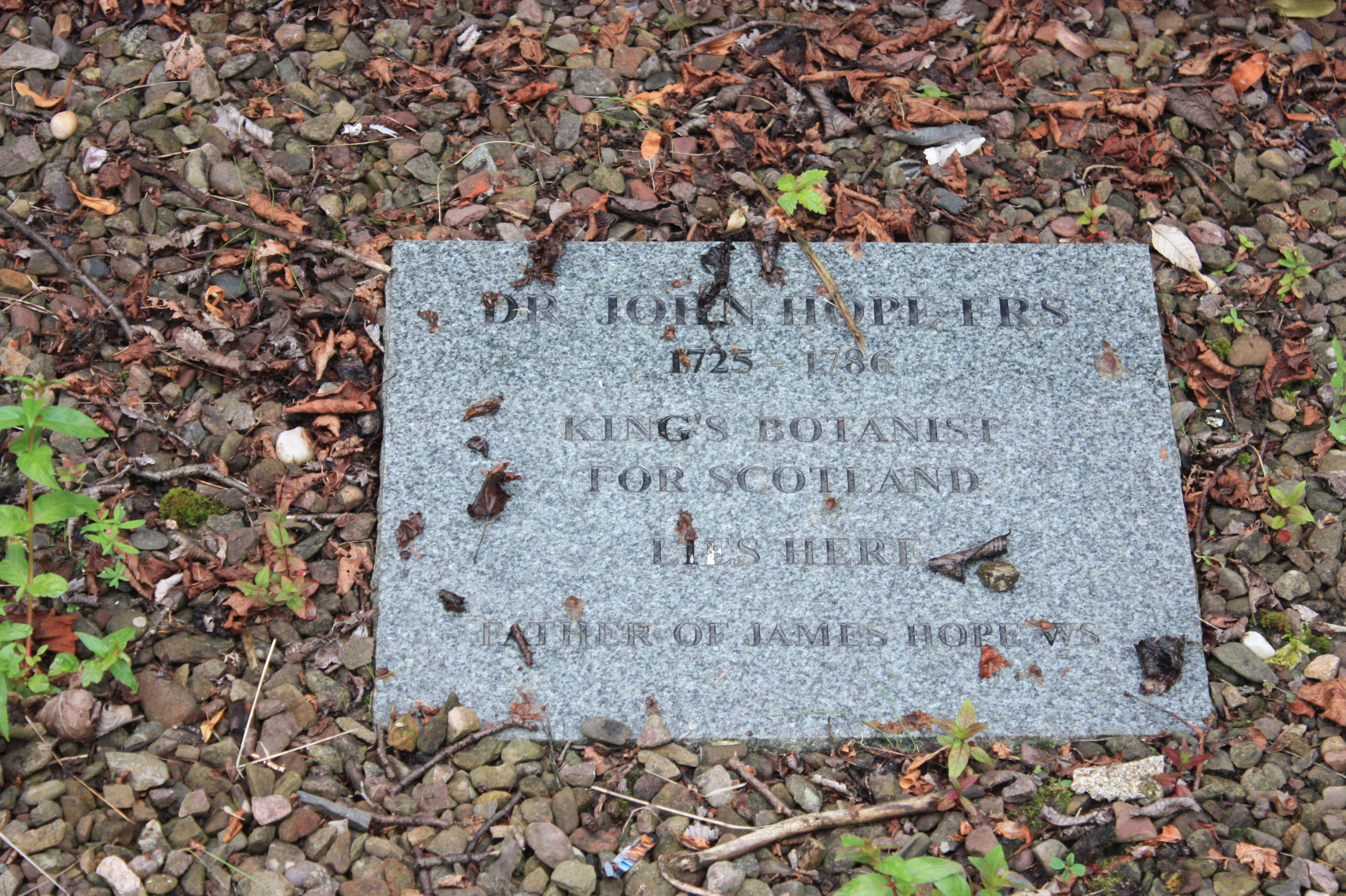
The tablet to John Hope, Greyfriars Kirkyard

Professor John Hope FRSE FRS PRCPE (10 May 1725 – 10 November 1786) was a Scottish physician and botanist. He did enormous work on plant classification and plant physiology, and is now best known as an early supporter of Carl Linnaeus's system of classification. He did not publish much.

In 1783, he was a joint founder of the Royal Society of Edinburgh.

In 1784, Hope was elected as president of the Royal College of Physicians of Edinburgh (1784–6).

== Early life ==
Born in Edinburgh on 10 May 1725, John Hope was the son of surgeon Robert Hope and Marion Glas, and a grandson of Archibald Hope, Lord Rankeillor, a Senator of the College of Justice who was in turn the son of Sir John Hope, 2nd Baronet. He was the great-grandson of Sir Thomas Hope, 1st Baronet.

He was educated at Dalkeith Grammar School, then studied medicine at the University of Edinburgh. He took leave to study botany under Bernard de Jussieu at the University of Paris, but returned to his studies in Scotland, graduating MD from the University of Glasgow in 1750.

For the next decade he practiced medicine, indulging in botany in his spare time. With the death of Charles Alston in 1760, he succeeded him as the 4th Regius Keeper of the Royal Botanic Garden Edinburgh and King's Botanist and as Professor of Botany and Materia Medica at the University of Edinburgh. However Hope saw his responsibility for materia medica as a threat to his work in botany, and therefore arranged for the chair to be split: Hope became Professor of Medicine and Botany, and a separate chair of Materia Medica was created.

In 1763, Hope succeeded in promoting the idea of combining the gardens and collections at Trinity Hospital and Holyrood to a new, combined site on Leith Walk to the north. Transfer of plants took several years and the old gardens closed in 1770.In the spring of 1689, for certain strategic military reasons, the Nor Loch which lay west of the Physic Garden was drained, resulting in the flooding of the garden, with much mud and general rubbish being deposited, to the ruination of many of the plants. He also succeeded in obtaining a permanent endowment for the garden, thus establishing arguably the first ever "Royal Botanic Garden". Though he published only a few papers, and is therefore little remembered as a botanist, he made many early physiological experiments. These informed his teaching, but were not published, and were only discovered in his unpublished manuscripts many years after his death. He was elected a Fellow of the Royal Society in February 1767. He was appointed Physician in Ordinary to the Royal Infirmary of Edinburgh in 1768. In 1774 he was elected a member of the Aesculapian Club.

In later life he lived at High School Yards on the southern edge of the Old Town.

He died in Edinburgh on 10 November 1786, and was interred at Greyfriars Kirkyard.

== Botanical Reference ==
The genus Hopea is named after Hope.,

== Bibliography ==
- Hope, John (1766). "Extract of a letter from Dr John Hope, Professor of Medicine and Botany in the University of Edinburgh to Dr Pringle; dated Edinburgh 24 Sept. 1765". Philosophical Transactions of the Royal Society of London. 55: 290–293. (Deals with Rheum palmatum)

== Family ==
He was married to Juliana Stevenson, sister of Alexander Stevenson, also a joint founder of the Royal Society of Edinburgh.

The couple had the following children:

- Robert Hope
- Marianne Hope, d. 1837, married James Walker, Esq.
- Major John Hope, (1765–1840)
- Thomas Charles Hope, FRSE, (1766–1844)
- James Hope WS, (1769–1842)

His grandson, John Hope WS (1807–1893) was a noted campaigner and philanthropist who founded the Hope Trust.

== Secondary sources ==
- Morton, A.G. (1986). John Hope 1725-1786 Scottish Botanist. Edinburgh: Edinburgh Botanic Garden (Sibbald) Trust. ISBN 0-9504270-5-5. OCLC 1244860971. (digital edition in Internet Archive: one hour lending); new edition by Henri J. Noltie, 2011 ISBN 9781906129712

Academic offices
Preceded by John Gardiner	President of the Royal College of Physicians of Edinburgh; 1784–1786	Succeeded by James Hay
