= Thomas Hope of Kerse =

Scottish judge

Sir Thomas Hope of Kerse (1606–1643) was a Scottish judge and politician.

== Life ==
The second son of Sir Thomas Hope of Craighall, by his wife Elizabeth, daughter of John Bennett of Wallingford, Berkshire, he was born on 6 August 1606. On 17 July 1631 he was admitted advocate.

On 16 July 1633 Hope was knighted by Charles I at Innerwick. He bought the heritable position of the Sheriff of Clackmannan in 1638 from William Livingston and was commissioner in the Scottish parliament for Clackmannanshire in 1639, 1640, and 1641. In 1639, and again in 1640, he was colonel of the troop raised by the College of Justice to attend General David Leslie as his bodyguard. In September 1641 he proposed in parliament, on behalf of the barons, that the estates should appoint officers of state and privy councillors by ballot, but the proposal was lost.

His Edinburgh house, Hope House, on the Cowgate, was demolished to build Edinburgh Central Library. The inscribed door lintel, reading "TECUM HABITA 1616" is built into the main stair of the library near the Edinburgh Room.

Hope was prominent in opposing Charles I's demand for a public inquiry into "The Incident", and was the author of the compromise made between the king and the estates over the appointment of John Campbell, 1st Earl of Loudoun, as Lord Chancellor. On 13 November 1641 the estates appointed him an ordinary lord of session and lord justice-general, and he was also a commissioner to treat with the English parliament for the suppression of the Irish Rebellion.

In the parliament of 1643, Hope was member for Stirlingshire, but died that year on 23 August, at Edinburgh. He wrote the book The Law Repertorie.

== Recognition ==
He gave his name to Hope's Close on Edinburgh's Royal Mile.

== Family ==
He married Helen Rae, daughter of Adam Rae of Pitsindie and had the following known children:

- Thomas
- Sir Alexander Hope of Kerse, 1st Baronet Hope of Kerse created on 30 May 1672
- Anna
