= Henry de Grangues =

Lieutenant-General Henry de Grangues (died June 1754) was a British Army officer.

He entered the Army during the reign of William III of England, two years before the peace of Ryswick. He served in the wars of Queen Anne, and was promoted to the lieutenant-colonelcy of the Royal Regiment of Dragoons. When the contest respecting the succession to the Holy Roman Emperorship and the rule of the Archduchy of Austria, Kingdom of Hungary and Bohemia involved Europe in the War of the Austrian Succession, he was appointed colonel of a newly raised regiment which was numbered the 60th Foot, his commission bearing date the 21 January 1741. On 1 April 1743 he was removed to the 9th Dragoons, and on 1 November 1749 he obtained the colonelcy of the 4th Irish Horse (later 7th Dragoon Guards), which he retained until his death.

Military offices
Preceded by New regiment	Colonel of de Grangues's Regiment of Foot; 1739–1742	Succeeded by Sir John Bruce Hope
Preceded by Andrew Bissett	Colonel of de Grangues's Regiment of Foot; 1742–1743	Succeeded by Charles Frampton
Preceded by John Brown	Colonel of de Grangues's Regiment of Dragoons; 1743–1749	Succeeded by George Reade
Preceded by Sir John Mordaunt	Colonel of de Grangues's Regiment of Horse; 1749–1754	Succeeded by Henry Seymour Conway
