= Alastair Macdonald (British Army officer) =

British Army general

General Alastair Macdonald
- Military career
- Allegiance: United Kingdom
- Branch: British Army
- Rank: General
- Commands: Commander-in-Chief, Scotland
- Conflicts: Crimean War

General Alastair M'Ian Macdonald was a British Army officer who became Commander-in-Chief, Scotland.

== Military career ==
Macdonald was commissioned as an ensign in the 92nd Regiment of Foot in 1846 and became aide-de-camp to Sir John Pennefather in 1854. He fought at the Battle of Alma in September 1854 and the Battle of Inkerman in November 1854 during the Crimean War. He became Assistant-Adjutant-General at Dover and then aide-de-camp to the Duke of Cambridge. Promoted to major-general, he went on to command the troops in the North British District in 1881 before retiring in 1885.

In August 1881 he oversaw and commanded the second Royal Volunteer Review in Holyrood Park with 44,000 soldiers parading in front of Queen Victoria.

Military offices
Preceded by Sir William Hope	Commanding the troops in the North British District; 1881–1885	Succeeded by Alexander Elliot
