= De Grangues's Regiment =

Infantry regiment of the British Army during the War of the Austrian Succession

A regimental private in 1742

Henry de Grangues's Regiment of Foot was an infantry regiment of the British Army during the War of the Austrian Succession. It was commanded by Colonel Henry de Grangues and was ranked as the 60th Regiment of Foot. On 2 February 1741 a royal warrant was issued to Henry de Grangues to raise a regiment of foot of ten companies. De Grangues had previously had command of a Dutch regiment in the English service.

In October 1742 De Grangues took command of the 30th Regiment of Foot, later rising to rank of lieutenant-general in the year of his death, 1754. The colonelcy of the 60th Foot, which was transferred to the Irish Establishment, remained vacant until 1743 when Sir John Bruce Hope, 7th Baronet was appointed. The regiment was disbanded in 1748. On 1 April 1743 de Grangues was appointed Colonel of 9th Regiment of Dragoons on the Irish establishment.
