= John Hope (merchant) =

French courtier and merchant

John Hope was a French courtier and merchant who settled in Edinburgh.

According to family histories "John de Hope" came to Scotland in the entourage of Madeleine of Valois in 1537. His family was from Picardy, and their original name was Houblon. It seems more likely that he was John Hope alias "Petit Johnne, Trumpetour", possibly in the service of John Stewart, Duke of Albany, governor of Scotland, and made a burgess of Edinburgh in March 1517.

He set up business as a merchant in Edinburgh and married Bessie (or Elizabeth) Cumming.

The royal treasurer's account mention French grey cloth bought from a "Johne Hoip" in September 1537 for the costumes of the grooms in the royal stable, and that in August 1537 "Johne Hope" was among the merchants who supplied black cloth for the mourning clothes and riding equipment worn by the ladies in waiting of Madeleine of Valois.

The Hope family were dealers in textiles like many successful Edinburgh merchants, and imported luxury fabrics such as velvets, silver lace and cloth-of-gold. John's son Edward married a Parisian woman, Jacqueline de Tot. He supported the Scottish Reformation in 1560.

John Hope built a house on Edinburgh high street between Chalmers and Barringers' closes. When this house was demolished an attractive fireplace was discovered and is now displayed in the rebuilt Trinity College Kirk. It appears to be older than John Hope's time. A gothic basin or piscina from the house was reused at Darnick Tower.

The next family home in Edinburgh was at the top of the Royal Mile on the north side of Castlehill, entered through Tod's close or Edward Hope's Close. The complex of buildings was sometimes known as the palace of Mary of Guise. Various items from the demolished buildings are displayed in the National Museum of Scotland.

John's grandson was the lawyer Sir Thomas Hope of Craighall whose house was demolished to build the public library in Edinburgh.
