= Sir Archibald Hope, 9th Baronet =

Scottish aristocrat

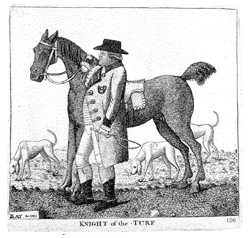
Sir Archibald Hope, "Knight of the Turf", Kay's Portraits

Sir Archibald Hope, 9th Baronet (1735 – 10 July 1794) was a Scottish aristocrat.

== Life ==
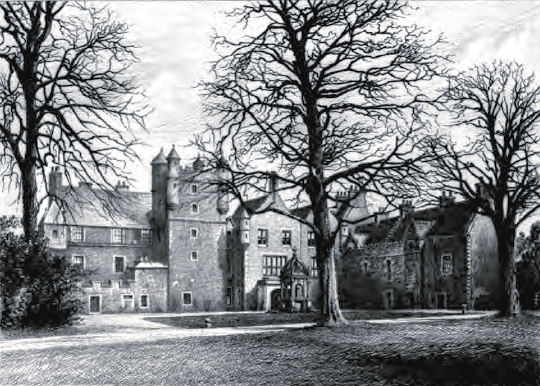
Pinkie House

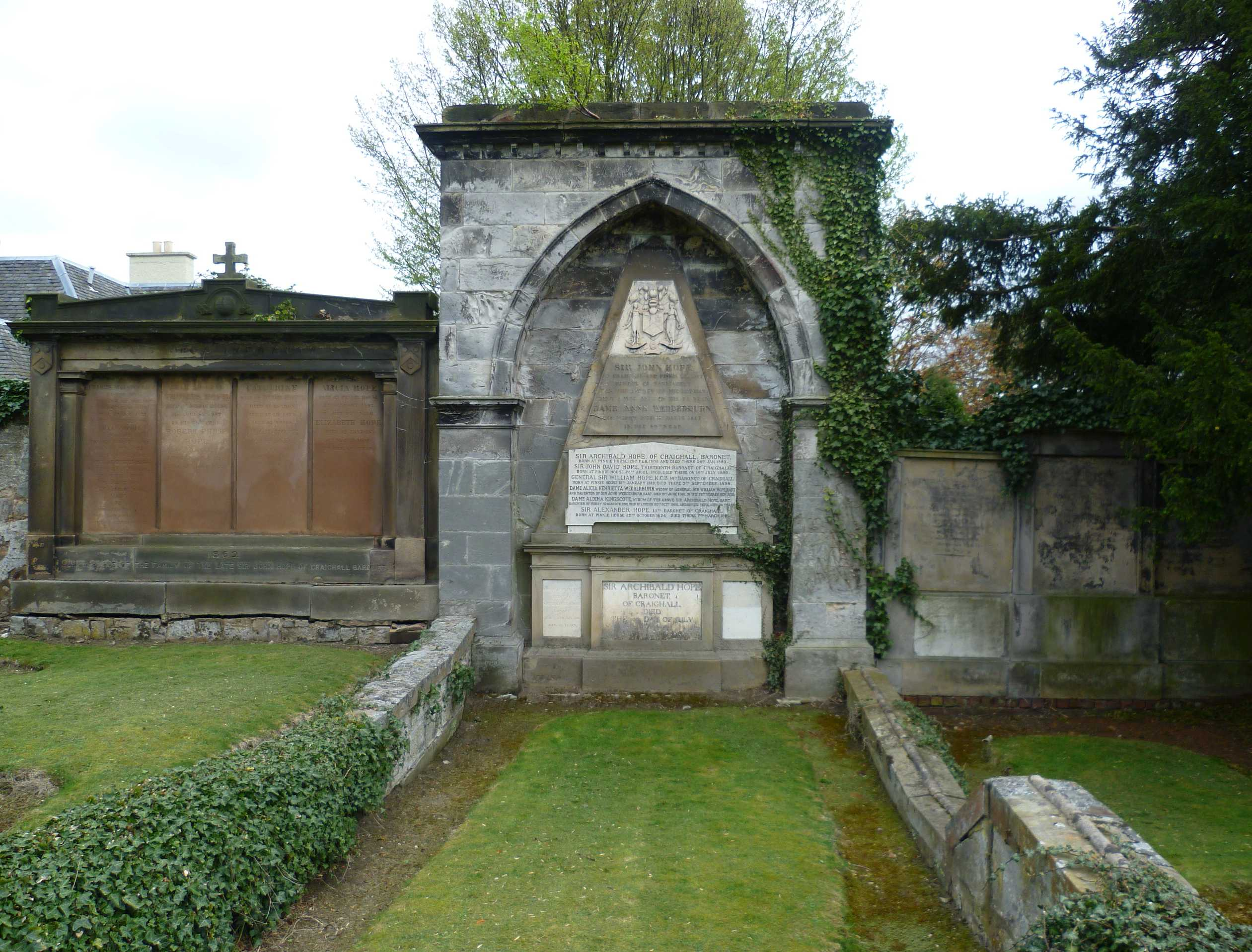
General Sir Archibald Hope's Grave, Inveresk Parish Kirkyard

Sir Archibald Hope was born in 1735, the only surviving son of Archibald Hope and Catherine Todd, eldest daughter of Hugh Todd. Sir Archibald's father was the oldest son of Sir Thomas Hope, 8th Baronet. Sir Thomas was an early promoter of agriculture in Scotland. One of his more ambitious projects was the draining and cultivating of a marshy piece of land south of Edinburgh. Today that area is known as The Meadows, but historically was often referred to as Hope Park. When his father died young, Sir Archibald became the heir to the baronetcy, which he succeeded to on 17 April 1771, upon the death of his grandfather.

The Hope Baronetcy of Craighall in the County of Fife, was created in the Baronetage of Nova Scotia on 19 February 1628 for Thomas Hope, a Scottish lawyer and advisor to Charles I.

In 1778 Sir Archibald purchased Pinkie House in Musselburgh, Edinburgh, Scotland from the Marquess of Tweeddale and established it as the seat of the Hopes of Craighall. Like his grandfather father before him, Sir Archibald had a great interest in agriculture, and was devoted to improving his estate, establishing a considerable and profitable salt and coal works on them.

The only public office Sir Archibald held was Secretary to the Board of Police, and upon the abolition of the office, received a life compensation in lieu of the office.

In 1789, caricaturist John Kay entitled his likeness of Sir Archibald, Knight of the Turf, likely as a nod to his presidency of the Caledonian Hunt.

Sir Archibald Hope died at Pinkie House on 10 July 1794. He is buried in the Hope family plot at St. Michael's Churchyard, Inveresk, Scotland.

== Family ==
Sir Archibald married twice, and had large families with both wives. In 1757 he married Elizabeth Macdowell (d. 1778), the daughter of William Macdowell of Castle Semple, Renfrewshire, and had the following children:

- Archibald Hope, (1762 - 1782), died a prisoner of Hyder Ali's at Seringapatam
- Sir Thomas Hope, 10th Baronet, (1768–1801), died without issue and was succeeded in the baronetcy by his half-brother, Sir John Hope, 11th Baronet
- Isabella Hope, married Colonel William Cullen of Parkhead, d. 1842; she survived the sinking of the Winteron East Indiaman off the coast of Madagascar, 20 August 1792
- Catherine Hope, d. 1826
- Grahame Hope, d. 1843
- Elizabeth Hope, d. 1827

In 1779, after his first wife's death, Sir Archibald married Elizabeth Patoun (d. 1818), the daughter of John Patoun of Inveresk, and had the following children:

- Sir John Hope, 11th Baronet, (1781–1853), was succeeded in the baronetcy by his eldest son, Sir Archibald Hope, 12th Baronet
- Hugh Hope (1782–1822), a civil servant for the East India Company, and a portrait of him by Sir Henry Raeburn hangs in The Cleveland Museum of Art
- William Hope, (1784–1837), was a master-attendant at Calcutta
- Magdalen Hope, married John Scott of Gala, d. 13 July 1873, her eldest child was Hugh Scott of Gala.

Baronetage of Nova Scotia
Preceded by Thomas Hope	Baronet (of Craighall); 1771–1794	Succeeded by Thomas Hope
