= Craighall Castle =

- United Kingdom

Location
- Location in Fife
- Coordinates: 56°17′05″N 2°57′30″W

Site history
- Built: 1637
- Built by: Sir Thomas Hope
- In use: Until 1957
- Materials: Rubble
- Fate: Demolished

Craighall Castle is located in Ceres, Fife, Scotland. It was built in 1637 by Sir Thomas Hope but there was a tower of previous land owners before 1637. It is now demolished and only some of the castle's walls remain.

== History ==
The lands were owned by Andrew Kinninmond and his family before selling it to Sir Thomas Hope. Hope built the castle in 1637. In 1954, the old tower was removed after the castle's granary burnt down. The castle was in very poor condition and was demolished in 1957. Some portion of walls still remain.

== Architecture ==
Craighall Castle was built with rubble and stones. The walls are 1 metre to 1.3 metres thick. An old wall which is 10 metres long and 3.5 metres high still remains in the site.
