= Sir Archibald Murray, 3rd Baronet =

Scottish soldier, parliamentary commissioner and Gentleman

Arms of Murray of Blackbarony: Or, a fetterlock azure; on a chief of the second three mullets argent.

Sir Archibald Murray of Blackbarony, 3rd Baronet (died before 28 May 1700), was a Scottish soldier, parliamentary commissioner and Gentleman.

He was the son of Sir Alexander Murray, 2nd Baronet of Blackbarony, Sheriff of Peeblesshire (died c.1698), and Margaret Cockburn. He married Mary, eldest daughter of William Keith, 7th Earl Marischal, and they had seven children.

He served as a commissioner for Peeblesshire in the Parliament of Scotland in 1661–63, 1665, 1667, 1669–74, 1678, 1681–82, 1685–86 and 1689–98.

On 1 December 1669, Murray was appointed Lieutenant-Colonel in the Militia Regiment of the counties of Linlithgowshire and Peeblesshire, by King Charles II. He was appointed to a commission in 1680, charged with seeking out and punishing Covenanters in Peeblesshire, particularly those who had been at the Battle of Bothwell Brig in 1679.

He was appointed "Sole Master of Work, Overseer, and Director-General of their Majesties' buildings" on 24 December 1689 by King William III, filling the post which had been vacant since Sir William Bruce's dismissal in 1678.

Political offices
| Vacant Title last held by Sir William Bruce | Master of Work to the Crown of Scotland; 1689–1700 | Succeeded by James Scott of Logie |
Baronetage of Nova Scotia
| Preceded by Alexander Murray | Baronet (of Blackbarony) c.1668–c.1700 | Succeeded by Alexander Murray |
