= John Bruce Hope =

Scottish politician (1684–1766)

Sir John Bruce Hope 7th Baronet

Governor of Bermuda
- In office 1721–1727

Member of Parliament for Kinross-shire
- In office 1727–1734
- In office 1741–1747

Personal details
- Born: 1684
- Died: June 6, 1766 (aged 81–82)
- Spouses: Charlotte Halkett; Marianne Denune

Military service
- Allegiance: Kingdom of Great Britain
- Branch/service: British Army
- Rank: Lieutenant-General
- Unit: 2nd Troop Horse Grenadier Guards; 3rd Regiment of Foot Guards; 26th Regiment of Foot

Lieutenant-General Sir John Bruce Hope, 7th Baronet (1684 – 6 June 1766) was a Scottish soldier and politician who was 7th Baronet Hope of Craighall.

== Life ==
He was born John Hope, the third son of Sir Thomas Hope, 4th Baronet of Craighall by his wife Anne, daughter and heiress of Sir William Bruce, 1st Baronet of Kinross. He succeeded his elder brothers in the Hope baronetcy and in their mother's estate of Kinross, assuming the additional surname of Bruce.

Hope was a lieutenant and captain in the 2nd Troop Horse Grenadier Guards in 1708, and captain and lieutenant-colonel in the 3rd Regiment of Foot Guards the same year. He was lieutenant-colonel of the 26th Regiment of Foot from 1716 to 1718, and Governor of Bermuda from 1721 to 1727. He sat in Parliament as Member for Kinross-shire from 1727 to 1734 and from 1741 to 1747; he was hereditary sheriff of the county from about 1715 until the Heritable Jurisdictions Act. He was colonel of a regiment of foot from 1743 to 1748, and was promoted major-general in 1754 and lieutenant-general in 1758.

== Family ==
Bruce Hope married firstly Charlotte, daughter of Sir Charles Halkett, 1st Baronet of Pitfirrane; they had no children. His second wife was Marianne, daughter of the Rev. William Denune, of Pencaitland. Their only surviving child, Anne, who married Thomas Williamson at Edinburgh in 1774, did not inherit the Kinross estates, which instead went to the descendants of Bruce Hope's mother by her second husband, Sir John Carstairs of Kilconquhar.

== Sources ==
- George Edward Cokayne, "Hope, [...] sometime [...] Bruce-Hope" in The Complete Baronetage, volume II (1902) page 344.
- Paula Watson, HOPE, John (c.1684-1766), of Culdraines. in The History of Parliament: the House of Commons 1715-1754 (1970).
- Bayne, Thomas Wilson (1886). "Bruce, John Hope" . In Stephen, Leslie (ed.). Dictionary of National Biography. Vol. 7. London: Smith, Elder & Co. p. 109.

Parliament of Great Britain
Preceded by William Douglas until 1722	Member of Parliament for Kinross-shire; 1727–1734; 1741–1747	Succeeded by Robert Colvile from 1754
Military offices
Preceded by Henry de Grangues	Colonel of Sir John Bruce's Regiment of Foot; 1743–1748	Succeeded by Regiment disbanded
Baronetage of Nova Scotia
Preceded by Thomas Bruce-Hope	Baronet (of Craighall); 1729–1766	Succeeded by Thomas Hope
