= Craighall =

- Location within Gauteng Location within South Africa
- Coordinates: 26.1143°S 28.0256°E
- Country: South Africa
- Province: Gauteng
- Municipality: City of Johannesburg
- Main Place: Randburg
- Established: 1902

Area
  - Total: 1.37 km^{2} (0.53 sq mi)

Population (2011)
  - Total: 2,639
  - Density: 1,930/km^{2} (4,990/sq mi)

Racial makeup (2011)
  - Black African: 29.9%
  - Coloured: 1.8%
  - Indian/Asian: 2.5%
  - White: 63.7%
  - Other: 2.0%

First languages (2011)
  - English: 70.8%
  - Afrikaans: 7.6%
  - Zulu: 5.6%
  - Northern Sotho: 3.0%
  - Other: 12.9%
- Time zone: UTC+2 (SAST)
- Postal code (street): 2196
- PO box: 2024

Craighall is a suburb of Randburg, South Africa and is bordered by Hyde Park, Dunkeld and Parkhurst. It sits in between the busy arterial routes of Jan Smuts Avenue and Winnie Mandela Drive and is located in Region B of the City of Johannesburg Metropolitan Municipality.

== History ==
Craighall was established in 1902 by the Scot, William Rattray, the owner of a large farm, Klipfontein, which at the time was an hour's journey by horse-carriage to the north of the bustling mining town of Johannesburg. He divided the farm into a residential development, which he named Craighall after his birthplace in Blairgowrie, Scotland, and a recreational development of lakes and parkland, much of which still exists as the open land of Delta Park. Craighall was an attractive, fertile piece of land on a gentle west/north facing slope.

The main natural feature of Craighall is the cascading rocky waterfall on the Braamfontein Spruit at the north-west corner of the suburb. It flows year-round but becomes a particularly dramatic spectacle during heavy rain-storms. Waterfall Avenue, the original centre-piece avenue of the suburb, was named after it.

Craighall was originally planned with erven (stand) sizes at just under an acre (3,850 square metres, known as a "Craighall Acre"), although more than half have since been sub-divided into smaller stand sizes. It remains a spacious, treed residential suburb with abundant bird-life, yet located within 6 minutes drive of Sandton.
