= Pinkie House =

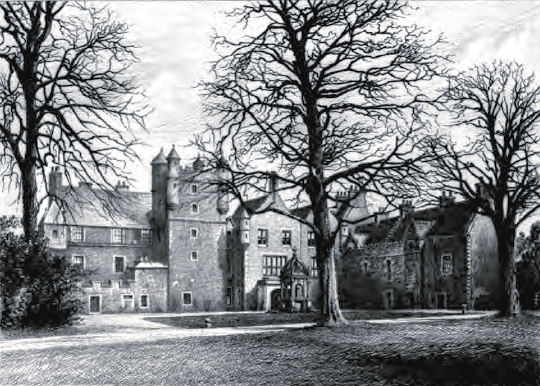
- Historical drawing of Pinkie House c. 1882
- Interactive map of the Pinkie House area

General information
- Type: Historic house
- Location: Musselburgh, Scotland
- Coordinates: 55.94262°N 3.043934°W
- Opened: 16th century
- Renovated: Early 17th century
- Owner: Loretto School

Technical details
- Floor count: 3

Listed Building – Category A
- Official name: High Street, Pinkie House the Mansionhouse and Draw Well
- Designated: 21 January 1971
- Reference no.: LB38314

Inventory of Gardens and Designed Landscapes in Scotland
- Official name: Pinkie House
- Designated: 30 March 2001
- Reference no.: GDL00313

Pinkie House is a historic house, built around a three-storey tower house located in Musselburgh, East Lothian, Scotland. The house dates from the 16th century, was substantially enlarged in the early 17th century, and has been altered several times since. Its location at grid reference NT348726 is to the east of the town centre, on the south side of the High Street. The building now forms part of Loretto School, an independent boarding school. Pinkie House is not far from the site of the disastrous Battle of Pinkie Cleugh, fought in 1547.

== Etymology ==
The name Pinkie, first recorded in the 12th century as Pontekyn, may derive from the Welsh words pant (valley) and cyn (wedge), referring to its situation at the end of the valley of the Esk. More logically (as the site is within the river delta rather than its valley, and has no Welsh connection) a Franco-Scots derivation of Pont Ekin (Esk) -bridge over the River Esk - would appear plausible for at least the original name.

== History ==
Pinkie was formerly the country seat of the Abbots of Dunfermline, and the tower house was built some time in the 16th century on the site of the Battle of Pinkie. In 1597, following the Reformation, it passed to Alexander Seton. He served as James VI's chancellor, and was created Earl of Dunfermline in 1605. The young Prince Charles, later Charles I, lived here as a boy, after his father's move to London at the Union of the Crowns in 1603. He slept in what is still known as "The King's Room". In 1607 Seton married his third wife, Margaret Hay of Yester, and from 1613 set about expanding the house, adding a long wing to the south, and decorating the interior:

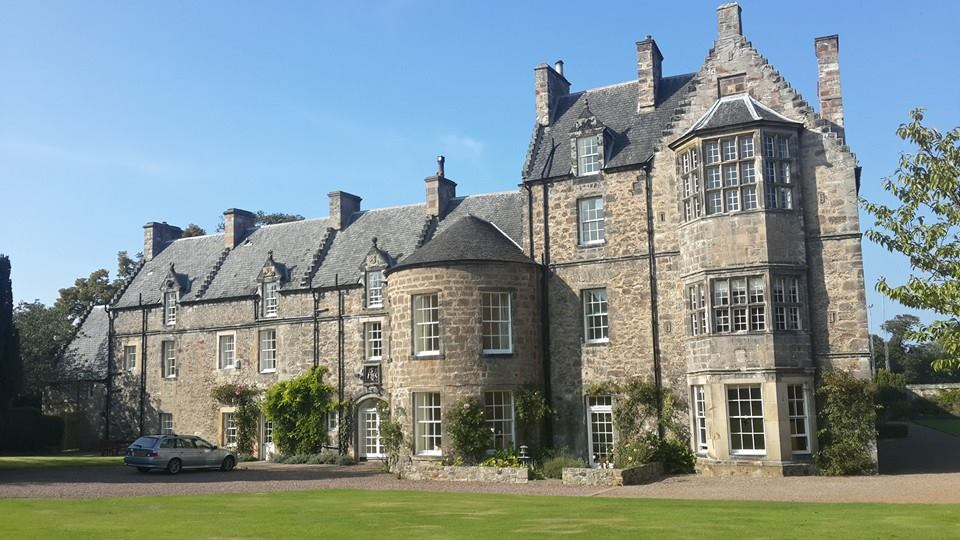
Pinkie House South Face

ALEXANDER SETONIUS VILLAM HORTOS ET HÆC SUBURBANA ÆDIFICIA FUNDAVIT EXSTRUXIT ORNAVIT … AMOENITATEM OMNIA AD CORDEM ANIMUMQUE HONESTE OBLECTANDUM COMPOSUIT
(Alexander Seton has planted, raised and decorated a country house … He has brought together everything that might afford decent pleasures of heart and mind.)

The Long Gallery is noted for its framed emblems and inscriptions. When Ben Jonson visited the house in 1619, he wrote to William Drummond of Hawthornden to enquire after this emblems.

Seton also altered his northern property Fyvie Castle before his death in 1622. In his will, he hoped the inner court at Pinkie would be completed with the roofing of a new low wing.

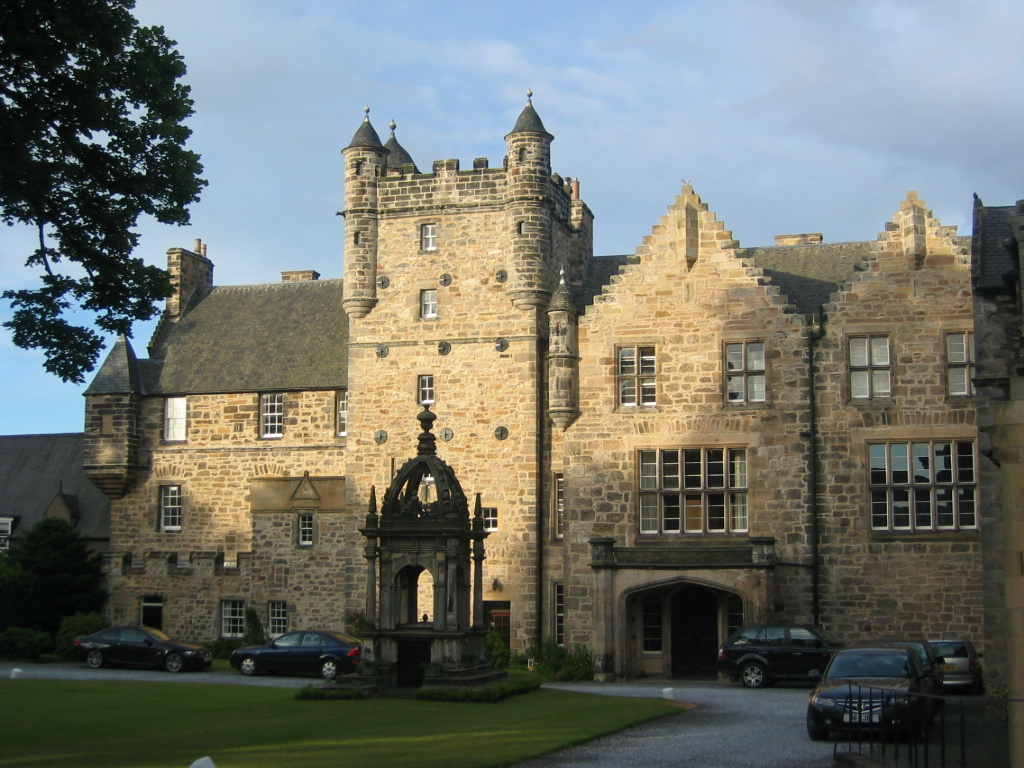
Pinkie House West Face

In 1694 the property passed to the Hays, the Marquess of Tweeddale adding a door to the east front. In 1745, following victory at the Battle of Prestonpans, Charles Edward Stuart, the "Young Pretender", stayed here, as well as using the building as a field hospital. In 1778 the Hays sold the building to Sir Archibald Hope, 9th Baronet Hope of Craighall, who made further alterations, and added a stable block in 1800 by John Paterson. Extensions and remodelling (crowstep gables) were carried out in 1825, designed by William Burn.

In 1951 Pinkie House was bought by Loretto School, and altered again in the 1970s, with the addition of two other buildings in the grounds. An annexe has been built at the north side and the south wing now serves as the headmaster's house. The rest of Pinkie House now has a number of functions including a 6th-form boys' boarding house. Loretto pupils also sit their examinations in the painted gallery.

== Description ==
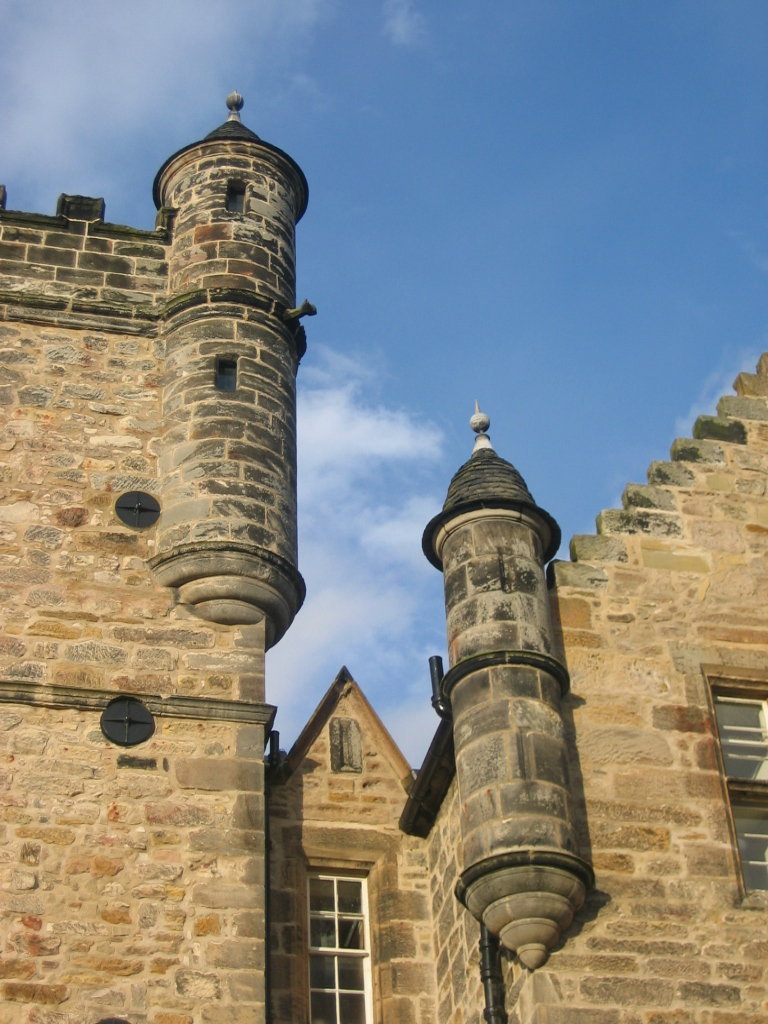

Pinkie House was originally an L-plan tower house, but extensions were added in the 17th, 18th and 19th centuries. The oldest part comprises a five-storey tower, to which Seton added bartizans and a crenellated parapet. This was attached to a strong three-storey main block with a pitched roof, again altered by Seton with square turrets. Inside there is a vaulted basement, and a wide turnpike stair up to the second storey. The interior has been modernised.

Seton's main addition was the long three-storey south wing, which includes on its upper floor the 96-foot Painted Gallery. His mason may have been William Wallace, although this attribution is only stylistic. On the south facade is a bay window, a feature new to Scotland in the early 17th century. The east façade is dominated by seven tall chimneys. There is a fine wooden ceiling, with classically inspired paintings in tempera, in the long gallery, as well as many 17th-century plaster ceilings. Another small painted ceiling was removed in 1951 and installed at the Huntly House museum in Edinburgh. Later interiors are by William Burn.

A Latin inscription above the door states that "Alexander Seton built this house not to the measure of his desire, but of his fortunes and estate".

A walled garden lies to the east of the house, with a shelter, doocot, and sundial. There is a Renaissance fountain or draw-well in the corner of the L, to the west of the house. This heavily ornamented structure was built around 1610.

== Gallery ==
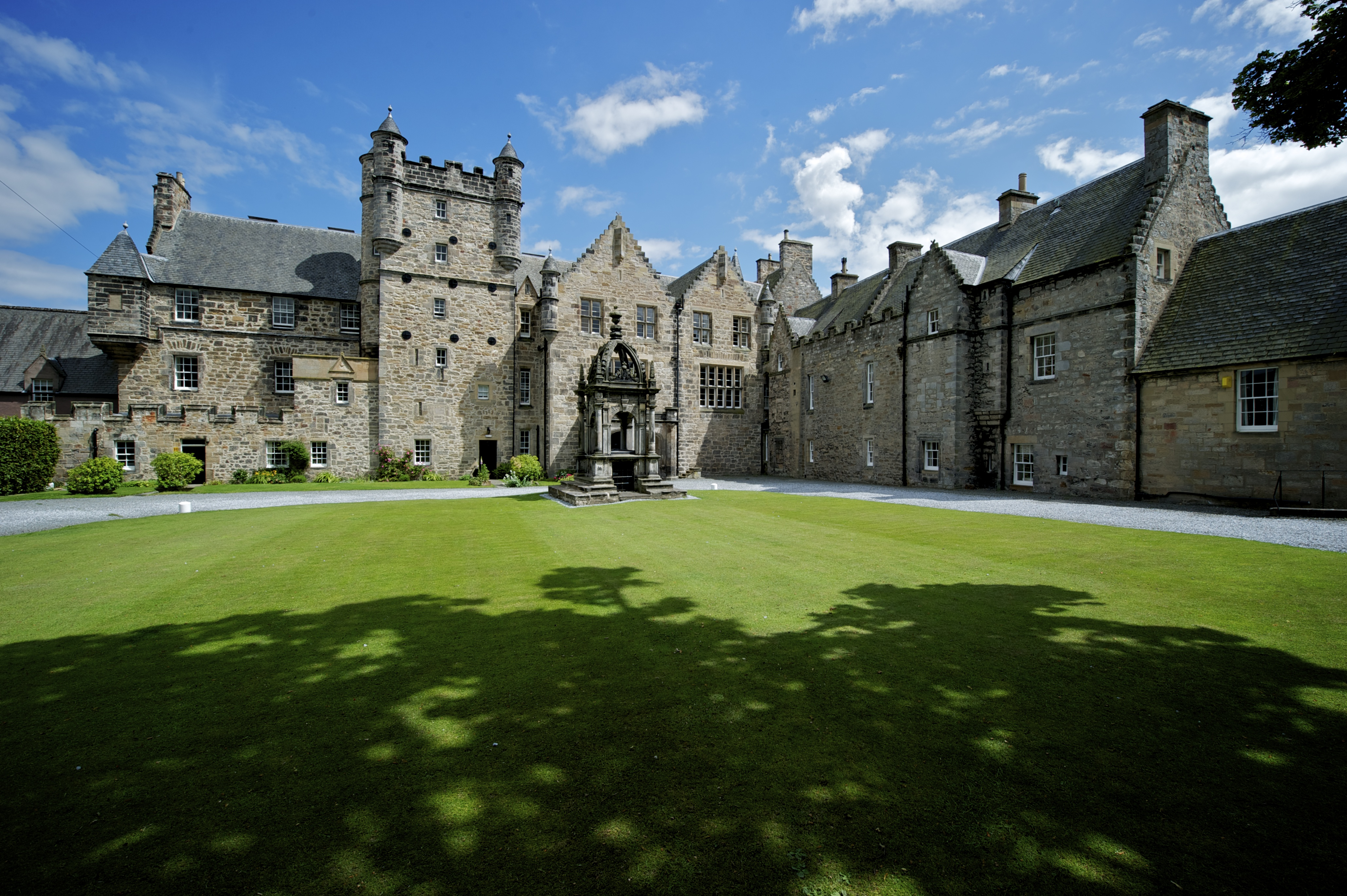
Pinkie House now Loretto School

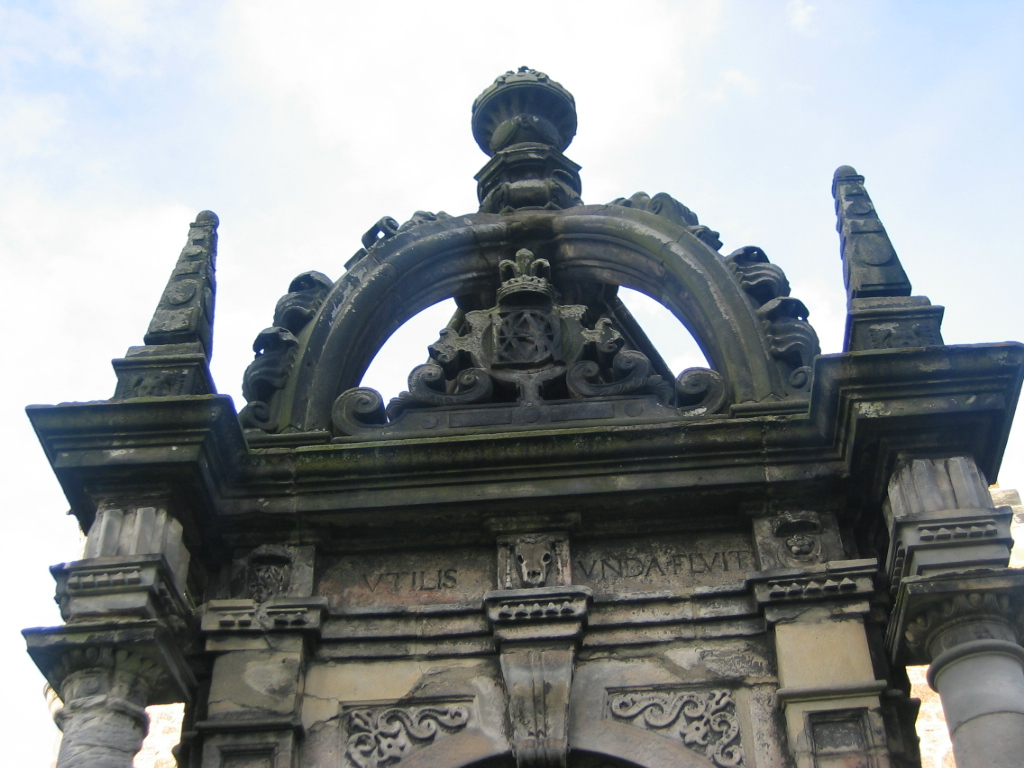
Renaissance fountain at Pinkie House

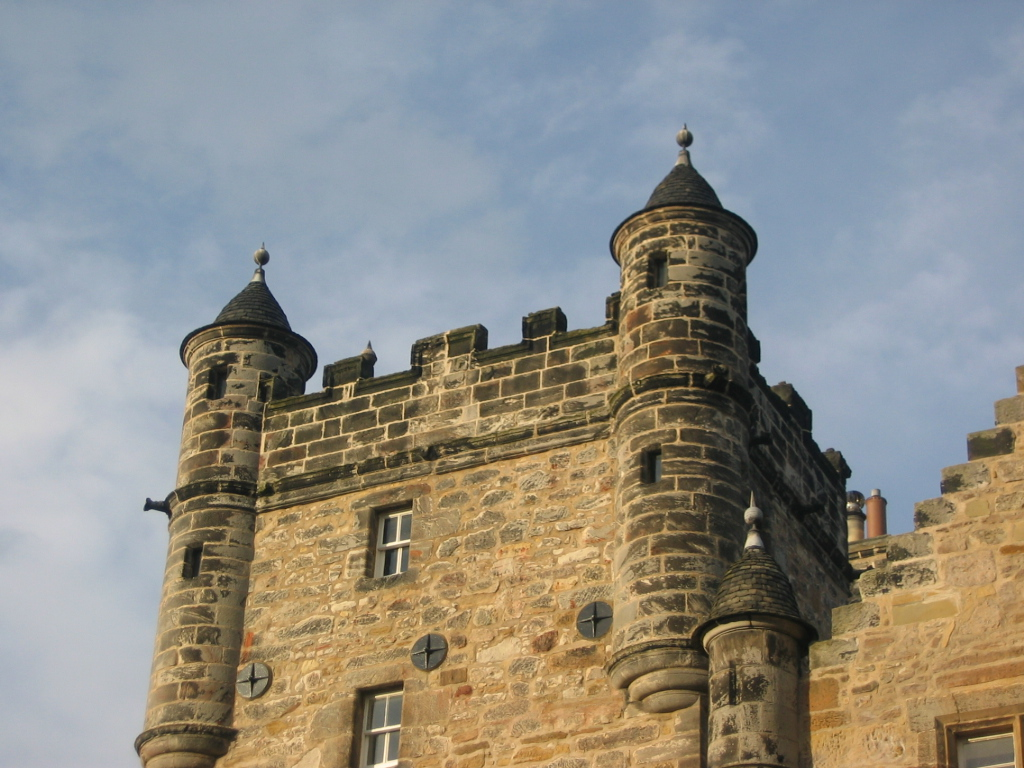
Pinkie Tower

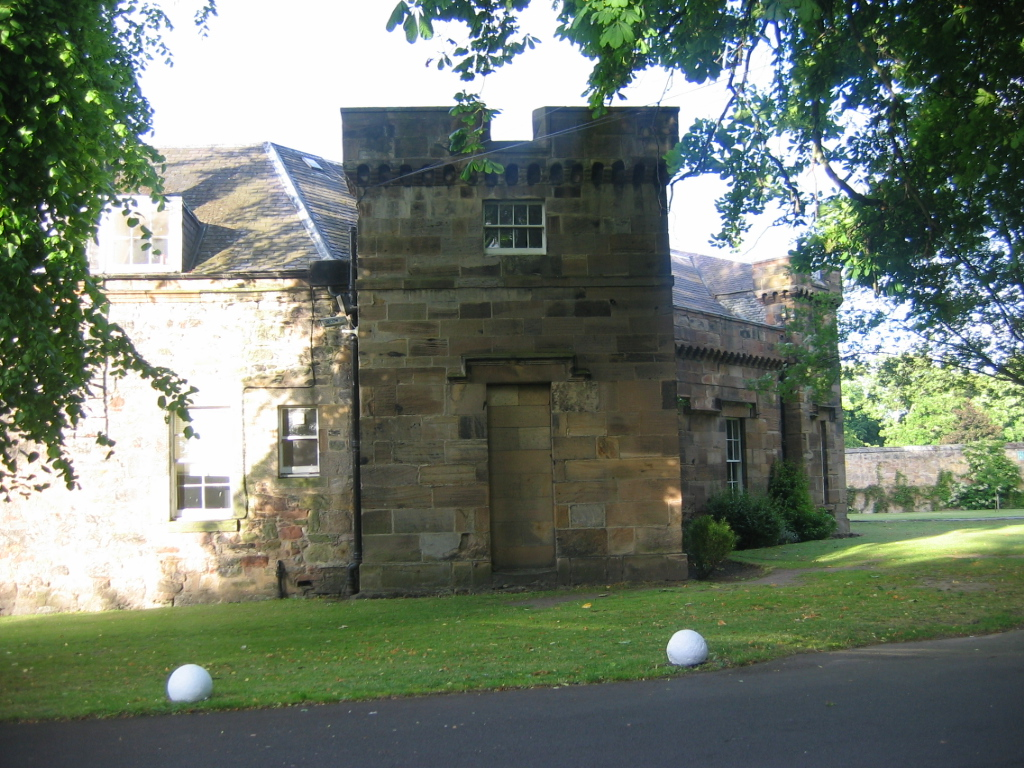
Entrance Lodge

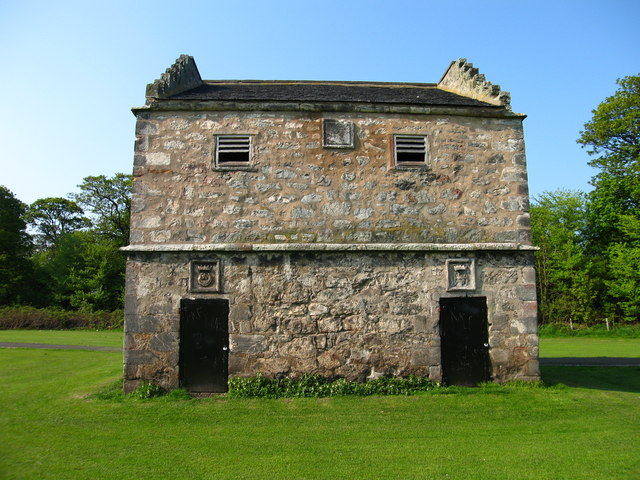
Doocot (English 'Dovecote') at Pinkie House with Seton's characteristic cipher of a crowned crescent and cinquefoil over door to right

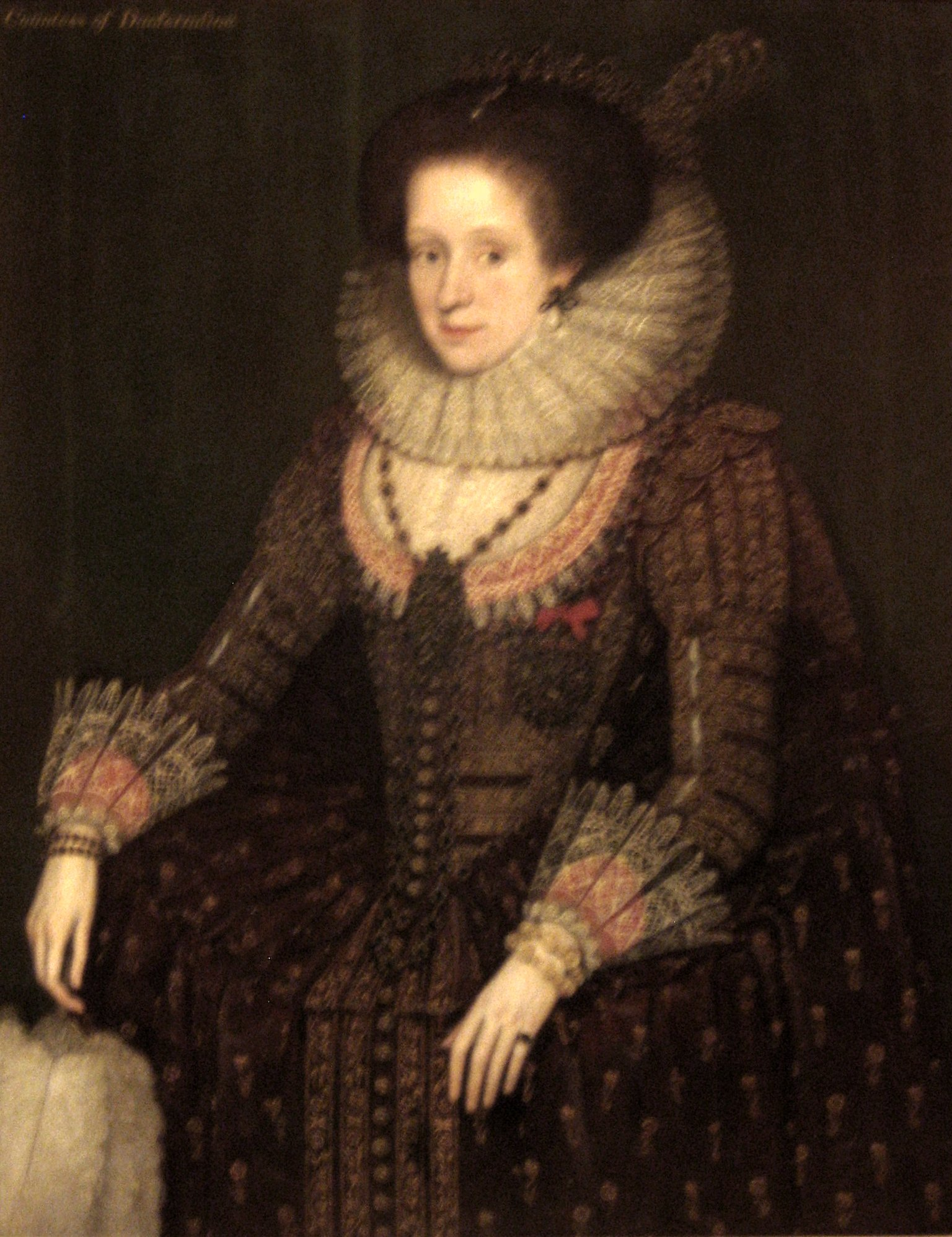
Lady Lilias Drummond
