= Sir Thomas Hope, 1st Baronet =

Scottish lawyer

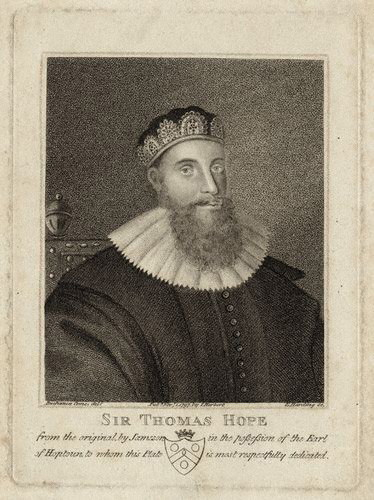
Sir Thomas Hope, 1st Baronet

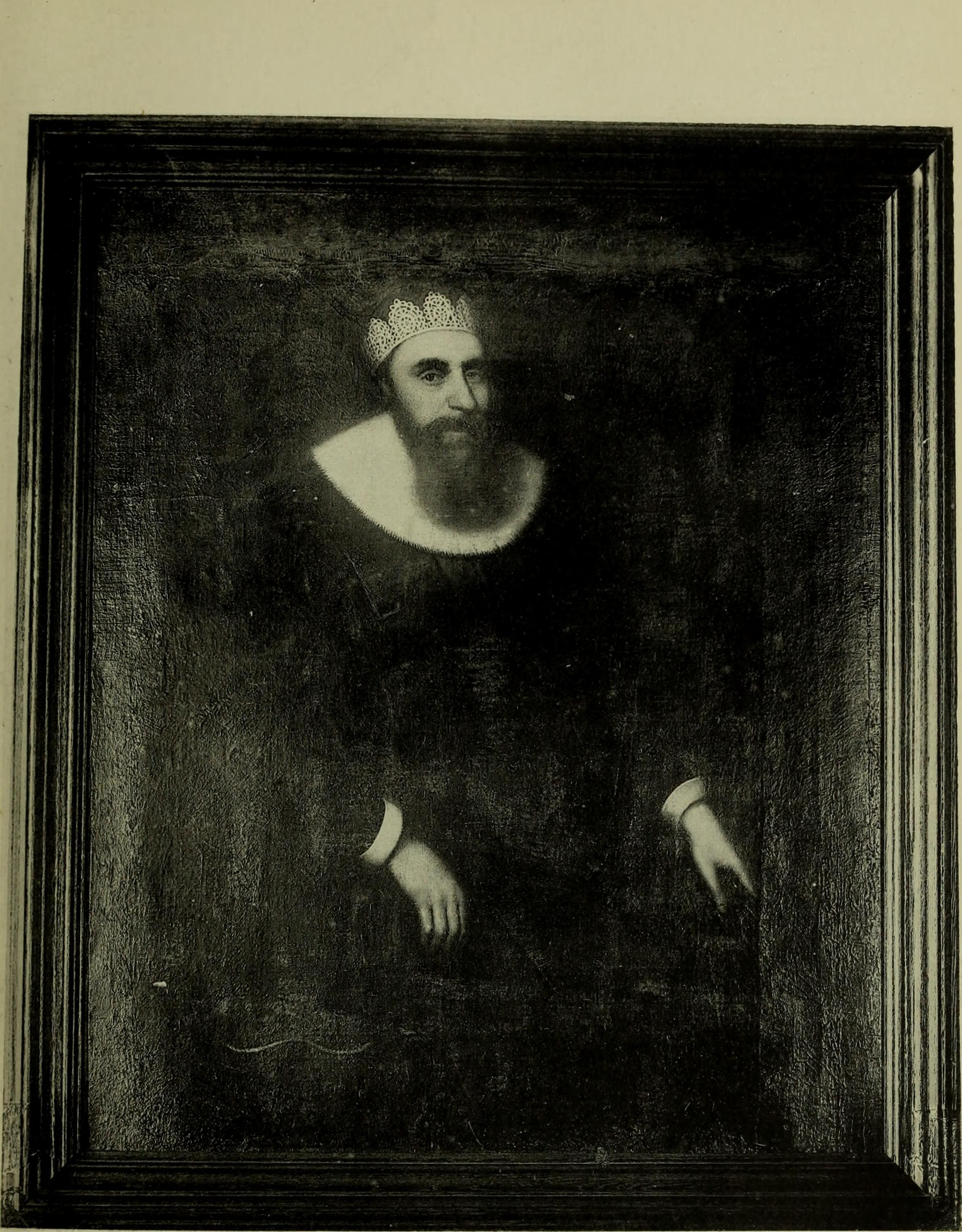
Sir Thomas Hope, 1st Baronet, Pinkie House Portrait by George Jamesone, 1638

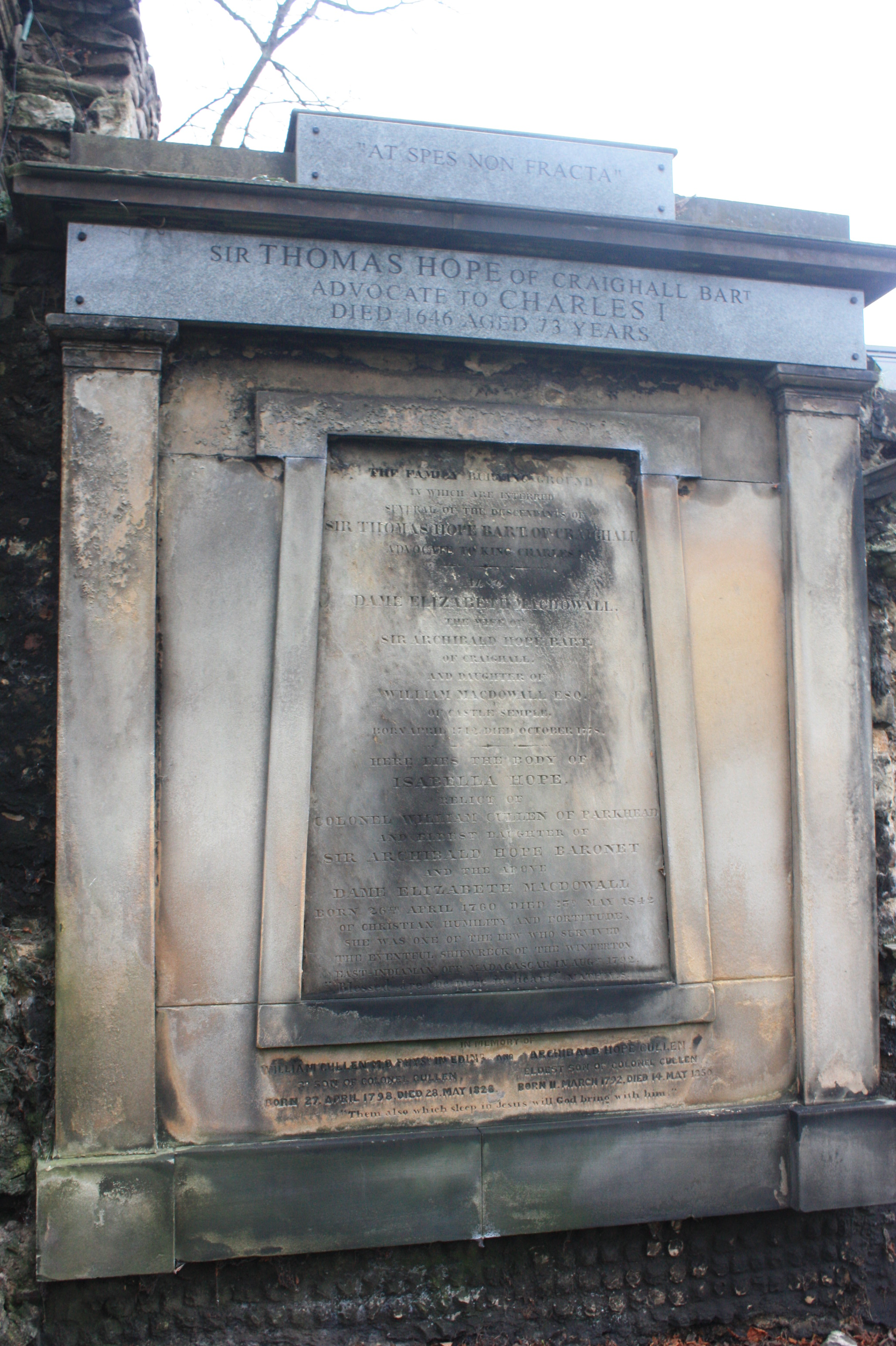
The grave of Sir Thomas Hope, Greyfriars Kirkyard

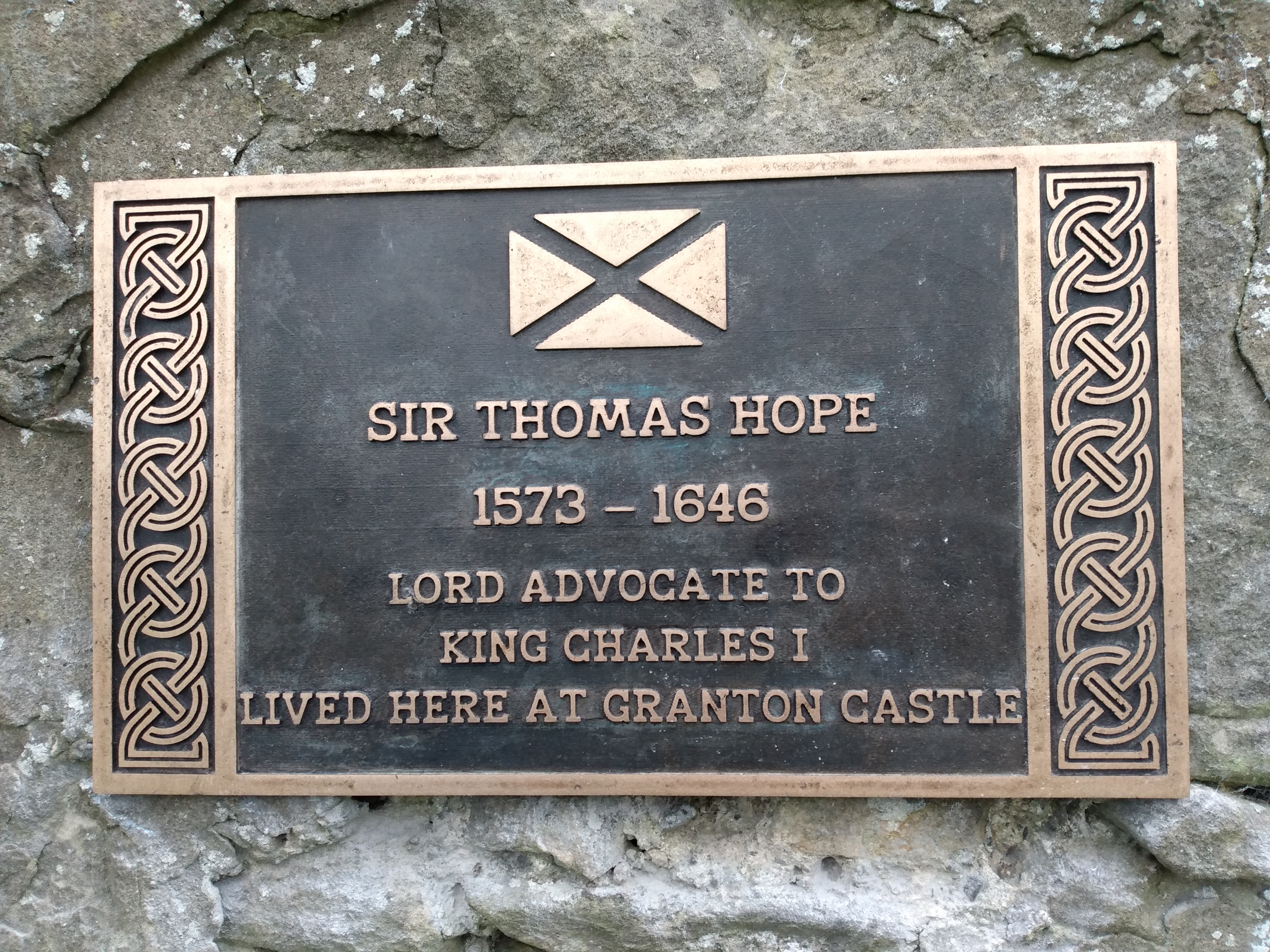
A plaque marking the former home of Sir Thomas Hope at Granton Castle in Edinburgh.

Sir Thomas Hope, 1st Baronet Hope of Craighall (1573 – 1646) was a Scottish lawyer, and Lord Advocate under Charles I.

== Life ==
He was the son of an eminent Edinburgh merchant, Henry Hope, and his French wife, Jacqueline de Tott, her parents of Swedish origin. His grandfather John Hope was an Edinburgh merchant of French origin.

Admitted as an advocate in 1605, he made his reputation in 1606 defending John Forbes, and five other ministers at Linlithgow who were charged with high treason. In 1608 he was on a team of lawyers, described as "the most learned and best experienced" who defended Margaret Hartsyde, a servant of Anne of Denmark accused of stealing her jewels.

He prepared the deed revoking James VI's grants of church property in 1625. He was appointed Lord Advocate under Charles I in 1626, and held the office until 1641. He was created a Baronet of Nova Scotia on 11 February 1628.

Hope worked for landowners, including Mary, Countess of Home, and Marie Stewart, Countess of Mar. He conducted the case against John Elphinstone, 2nd Lord Balmerino in 1634. As Lord High Commissioner to the General Assembly of the Church of Scotland in 1643, he maintained the king's temporising policy.

In 1645 Hope was appointed one of the Commissioners for managing the Exchequer, but died the next year.

He is buried in Greyfriars Kirkyard in Edinburgh. The grave lies in the north-west section of the original graveyard, against the west wall.

He bought the Fife estate of Craighall early in his career. His Cowgate home, built in 1616, was demolished in 1887 to make way for the Edinburgh Free Library.

== Related works ==
His "Practical Observations Upon divers titles of the Law of Scotland", commonly called the "Minor Practicks", were published in 1726, by Alexander Bayne.

In 1843 the Bannatyne Club published A Diary of the Public Correspondence of Sir Thomas Hope of Craighall, 1633–1645: From the Original, in the Library at Pinkie House, a collection Hope's official and private correspondence from the last twelve years of his life.

== Family ==
Hope married Elizabeth Bennet, daughter of John Binning or Bennet of Wallyford, Haddingtonshire. The couple had the following children:

- John Hope, Lord Craighall (1605?–1654)
- Thomas Hope, Lord Kerse (1606–1643)
- William, died young
- Henry, died young
- Sir Alexander Hope of Grantham/Granton (1611–1680), Carver Extraordinary and cup-bearer to Charles I.
- Sir James Hope of Hopetoun (1614–1661), progenitor of the Earls of Hopetoun
- David, died young
- Patrick, died young
- Charles, died young
- Elizabeth, died young
- Margaret, died young
- Mary/Marie, mother of Sir Charles Erskine, 1st Baronet of Alva
- Elizabeth, died unmarried
- Anne/Anna, married David Erskine, 2nd Lord Cardross

Of the four sons who survived infancy, three of these later qualified as advocates: John, Thomas and James. Two of these sons were elevated to judges in the Supreme Court.

Two of his sons were appointed to the bench while Hope was Lord Advocate; and it being judged by the Court of Session unbecoming that a father should plead uncovered before his children, the privilege of wearing his hat, while pleading, was granted to him. This privilege his successors in the office of Lord Advocate have in theory ever since enjoyed.

== Historical fiction ==
- Sir Thomas Hope is the subject of Nigel Tranter's last novel, Hope Endures (2005).

Legal offices
Preceded by Sir William Oliphant	Lord Advocate; 1626–1641	Succeeded by Sir Archibald Johnston
Baronetage of Nova Scotia
New creation	Baronet (of Craighall); 1628–1646	Succeeded by John Hope
