= Airfield Estate =

Urban farm, gardens and house, Dundrum, Dublin, Ireland

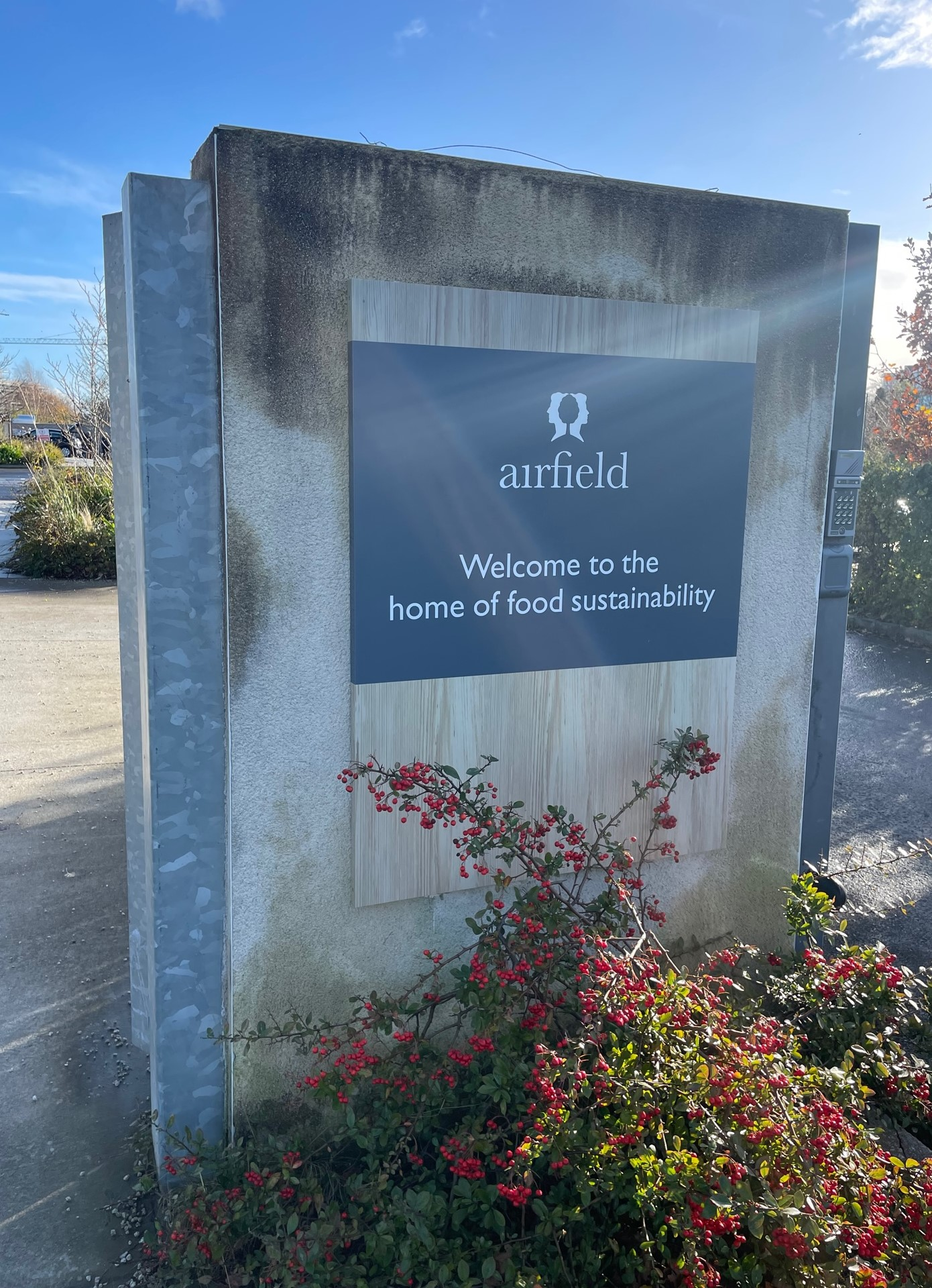

- Location within Dublin
- Town/City: Overend Avenue, Dundrum
- State: Dún Laoghaire–Rathdown
- Country: Ireland
- Coordinates: 53°17′19″N 6°14′04″W
- Established: c. 1830 (Airfield House built); 1894 (Overend family arrive, establish dairy herd); 1974 (Airfield Trust)
- Owner: Dromartin Estates Company and Airfield Trust
- Area: 38 acres (15 ha)
- Produces: milk, vegetables, meat
- Website: airfield.ie

Airfield Estate is a agritourism site in Dublin, Ireland. Describing itself as "Dublin's only urban working farm and gardens," it incorporates Airfield House, an Anglo-Irish big house, and welcomes visitors to learn about farming and the site's history. As of 2016, it had 75 employees and 280,000 annual visitors.

== History ==
The estate is located in the townland of Drummartin (Irish: Droim Máirtín, "Martin's ridge."). The house was built in circa 1830 by Thomas Mackey Scully, of a wealthy Anglo-Irish family from Naas, and named Bess Mount; in 1836 it became Airfield. Scully was a barrister and supported Daniel O'Connell and Repeal. Around 1830 he had married Elizabeth Walsh, a merchant's daughter from Summerhill, Dublin.

The Scullys were one of many landowning families who lost financially in the Great Famine (1845–50); in 1852 Airfield was in the hands of the Encumbered Estates' Court, who sold it to the printer Thomas Cranfield. In 1862 he sold it to the artist Francis Reynolds, who sold it to the Jury family of hoteliers in 1864.

In 1894 the house was sold to the Overend family; Trevor Overend was from a County Down grain-dealing family, but he became a solicitor and moved to Airfield with his wife Lily. They had three daughters: Letitia (1880–1977), Constance (who died in infancy) and Naomi (1900–1993). Letitia and Naomi were noted for their philanthropic work with the Children's Sunshine Home, St John Ambulance, DSPCA and National Society for the Prevention of Cruelty to Children; breeding of Jersey cattle; their world travelling; and their fondness for classic cars. When Trevor died in 1919 he, unusually for the time, left almost all his money to the women of the house, allowing them financial independence. The two daughters never married and were often regarded as eccentrics, driving their pre-war cars and refusing to sell their land for development, instead maintaining a Victorian-era farm in the midst of a suburbanising region.

In 1974 the Overend family left Airfield in trust for the Irish people.

In 2012, shortly after Apple Maps launched, the area was mistaken for being an airport simply titled "Airfield".

== Description ==
=== Farm and Garden ===
The farm raises animals including Jersey cattle; Jacob sheep; Oxford Sandy and Black pigs; Saanen goats; Rhode Island Red chickens; Irish Angus Cattle and donkeys. The farm also practises organic farming and soil regeneration.

From 2013 Kitty Scully and Colm O’Driscoll led the food and ornamental gardens. With Colm taking over head gardener of the estate from 2017-2022, he has led the eight acres of biodiverse, organically managed gardens. Continually evolving, they make the most of the temperate local climate. The ornamental gardens include a walled garden with generous borders and decorative pergola, as well as tropical borders, a shade garden, glasshouses and pollinator-friendly plantings. In the three-acre organic food garden there is always a bounty of seasonal crops to explore.

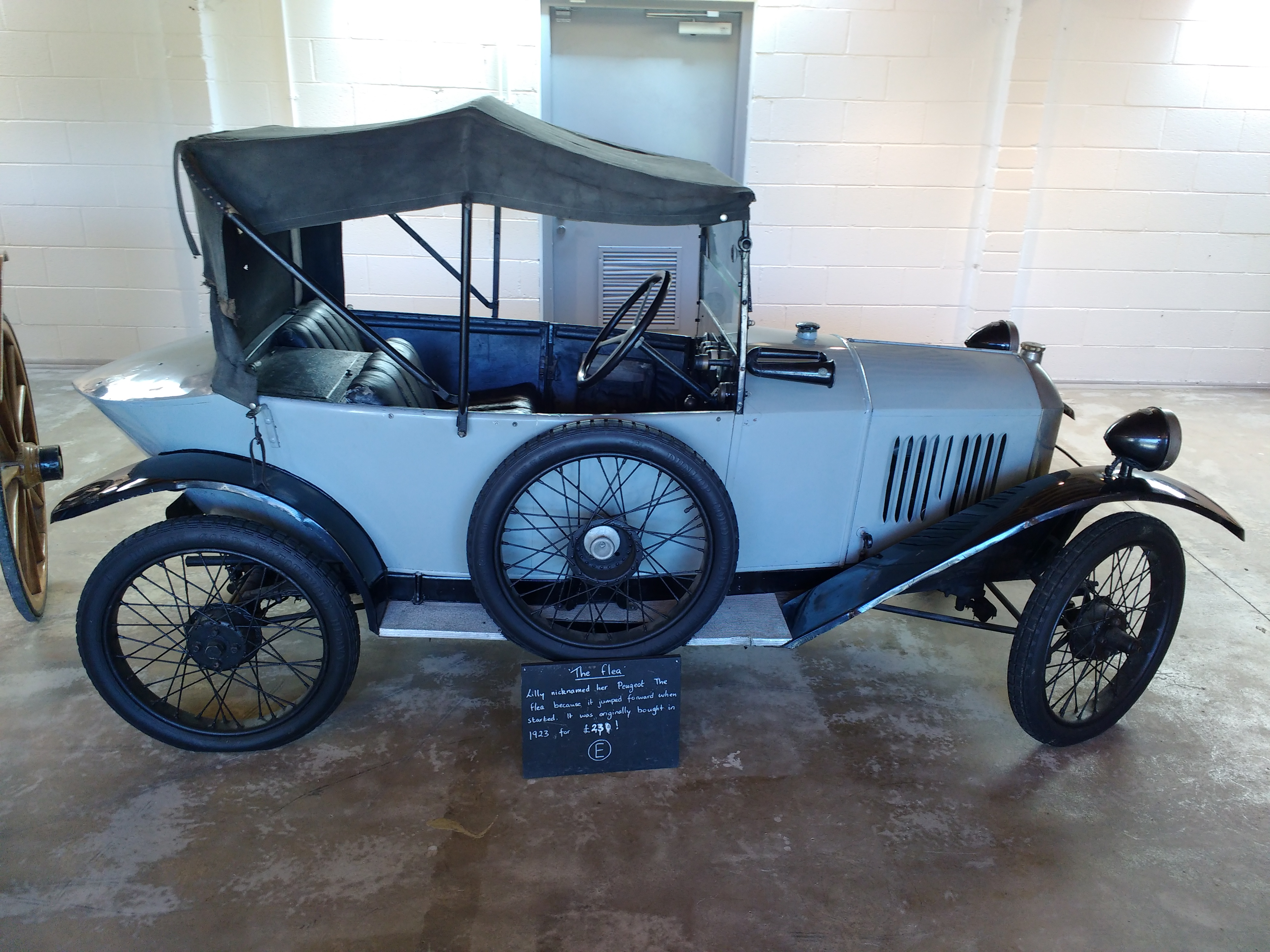
Lily Overend's Peugeot

The three cars driven by the Overend women are preserved:

- Letitia's 1927 Rolls-Royce Twenty Tourer
- Naomi's 1936 Austin 18 Tickford
- Lily's 1923 Peugeot "Quadrilette" Type 161

=== Airfield House ===
The house was refurbished in 2014. Its original entrance piers, railings and gates, as well as the house itself, a three-bay, two-storey Victorian structure, are protected structures.

== Cultural references ==
Airfield is mentioned in the 2021 Ross O'Carroll-Kelly novel, Normal Sheeple.
