= Ella Webb =

Irish paediatrician (1877–1946)

Isabella "Ella" Webb MBE
- Born: Isabella Gertrude Amy Ovenden; 16 October 1877; Dublin, Ireland
- Died: 24 August 1946 (aged 68)
- Known for: Founded the Children's Sunshine Home
- Medical career
- Profession: Physician
- Sub-specialties: Paediatrician
- Awards: Order of St. John Life Saving Medal (for acts of gallantry, Easter Rising, 1916)

Isabella ("Ella") Gertrude Amy Webb MBE (16 October 1877 – 24 August 1946) was a pioneering Irish paediatrician and founder of the Children's Sunshine Home for Convalescents (now LauraLynn Ireland Children's Hospice) a convalescence home for children with life limiting diseases.

== Early life and education ==
Isabella Gertrude Amy Ovenden was born on 16 October 1877, Webb's parents were Charles Ovenden, the Dean of St. Patrick's Cathedral, Dublin, and his wife Isabella Mary Ovenden (née Robinson). Webb is not to be confused with her cousin also called Isabella Gertrude, born 28 October 1877, whose parents, William Henry (Charles' brother) and Edith Ovenden née Lamb, who fought contentious divorce and custody proceedings in New Zealand, as a result of which a judge placed Webb's cousin in the custody of Charles and Isabella in Ireland.

Webb attended Alexandra College, Dublin, later continuing her education in Queen's College, London and subsequently University of Göttingen, then entering the Catholic University of Ireland. Webb was the first woman to attain the highest marks in the final medical examinations of the Royal University of Ireland, and graduating as an MD in 1906.

== Career ==
Webb worked in Trinity College until her marriage to George Webb, a Fellow of Trinity College Dublin, in 1907. They had two children, botanist D. A. Webb and Mary Ovenden Webb. Motorcycle racer Fay Taylour was a niece by marriage.

Following her marriage, Webb ran a private practice on Hatch Street. During this time she also working as honorary medical officer to St Patrick's Dispensary for Women and Children, attended two baby clinics, lectured, and acted as an external examiner to the Department of Agriculture & Technical Instruction.

Webb was lady district superintendent in the Alexandra College St John Ambulance Brigade in Ireland from 1914, and was on duty during the Easter Rising. During the conflict she set up an emergency hospital at the War Supply Depot, run by the Brigade in a building at 40 Merrion Square to deal with the wounded. For her bravery during this time she was awarded the Order of St. John Life Saving Medal (Silver) and later made a Lady of Grace of the Order of St John of Jerusalem (1916), and later awarded an MBE (1918).

In 1918, Webb was appointed anaesthetist in Adelaide Hospital in Dublin, making her the first female member of staff. Webb became focused on the treatment of childhood ailments, particularly those relating to poor diet and hygiene, reporting on the high mortality rate in children under one in Dublin. Webb is recognised as originating the first formal role for medical social workers in Ireland, then known as almoners.

In 1925 she founded the Children's Sunshine Home for Convalescents in Stillorgan, Dublin with help from Letitia and Naomi Overend. The Home initially specialised in treating children with rickets.

Webb was a physician in Saint Ultan's Children's Hospital, founded by Kathleen Lynn and Madeleine ffrench-Mullen from 1929 to 1946. She was elected fellow of the Royal Academy of Medicine in Ireland, and was awarded MA (jure officii).

Ella Webb died in 1946 at the age of 68.

== Legacy ==
The General Medicine and Cardiology ward in Adelaide Hospital is named in her honour. Webb was also the subject of a portrait by Seán Keating at the Golden Jubilee of the Easter Rising Exhibition in 1966 at the National Gallery of Ireland.

== Publications ==
- Hospital social service (1922)
- Ten years work at the Children's Sunshine Home, Stillorgan (Ir. Jn. Med. Sc., no. 113 (May 1935), 225–9)
- Maternity and child welfare in Dublin county borough (Dubl. Jn. Med. Sc., cxliv (August 1917), 86–97)
