= Naomi Overend =

Irish philanthropist and filmmaker

- Born: 19 August 1900; Dundrum, Dublin, Ireland
- Died: 24 October 1993 (aged 93); Dundrum, Dublin, Ireland

Naomi Overend (19 August 1900 – 24 October 1993) was an Irish philanthropist, filmmaker and motor enthusiast.

== Early life and family ==
Naomi Overend was born at Airfield House, Dundrum, Dublin on 19 August 1900. She was the youngest daughter of a solicitor, Trevor Overend and Bessie Anna "Lily" Overend (née Butler). She had two older sisters, Letitia born in 1880, and Constance born in 1894 who died in infancy. Initially Overend was educated at home by a governess, then went on to Alexandra College, Dublin.

== Philanthropy ==
Her philanthropy started at a young age, when at age 8 she organised a fete in aid of the Children's League of Pity, the junior division of the National Society for the Prevention of Cruelty to Children which had been established by her mother. Overend worked alongside her mother at the Dundrum and Ballinteer District Nursing Association, taking over as president when her mother retired in 1962.

She also supported the Society for the Prevention of Cruelty to Animals, and helped her mother to set up the Women’s National Health Association.

== Filmmaking ==
Overend travelled extensively throughout her life, and documented her travels in film and photography. She was present in Kitzbühel, Austria, when the Nazis invaded in 1938, and she documented the event in photographs.

The Irish Film Archive in Dublin currently holds the Overend film collection, containing 38 films (some of which are promotional material not filmed by the sisters). The University of East Anglia has included Naomi and Letitia Overend as part of their 'Women in Focus' project, which highlights female filmmakers within archives.

== Motoring ==
Along with her older sister, Overend was a motor car enthusiast. In 1936 her mother gave her an Austin 18 Tickford which she kept for the rest of her life, and a car that became well known around Dundrum and Dublin. Both sisters were members of the Irish Veteran and Vintage Car Club and the Leinster Motor Club. Overend developed an interest in cattle breeding at Airfield, particularly Jersey cattle. Her cattle were regular winners at the Royal Dublin Society annual spring show, with the cattle being recognisable by their Gilbert and Sullivan inspired names. Alongside her sister, Overend established the Airfield Trust to care for the farm and house, initially known as The Dromartin Trust. Overend travelled extensively with her sister, in Europe and internationally to India, Australia, and America. She was a keen skier, visiting Austria annually with friends until she was in her 60s.

== Death and legacy ==
Overend died at Airfield House on 24 October 1993. In 2006 Dún Laoghaire Rathdown County Council renamed Wyckham Way as Overend Way in recognition of the contribution of both the Overend sisters. The Airfield Estate archive, including Overend papers, from 1805 to 2001 is housed at the OPW-Maynooth University Archive and Research Centre at Castletown House.
