= Fay Taylour =

Irish motorcycle racer (1904-1983)

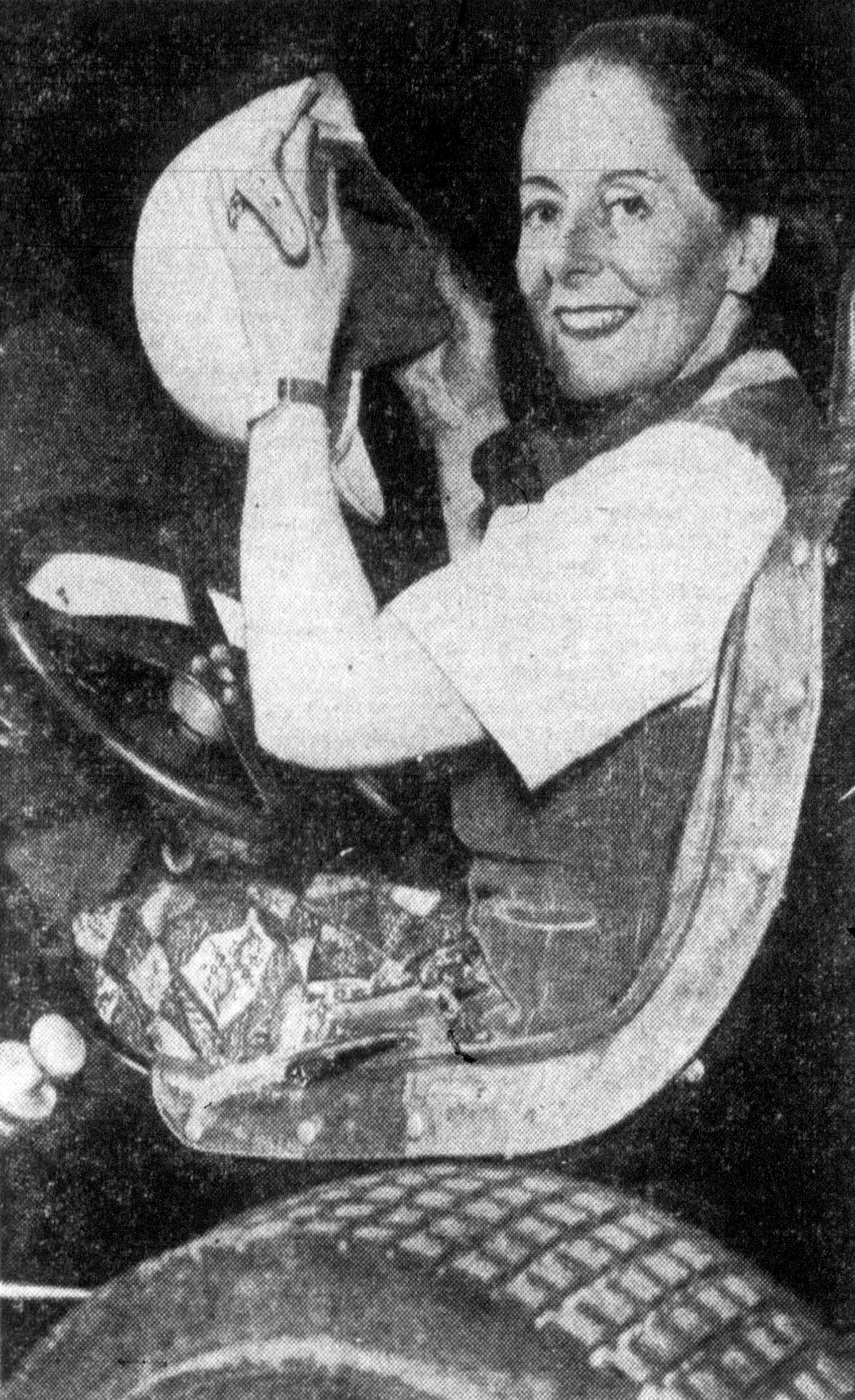
- Taylour, circa 1949

Personal information
- Nickname: Flying Fay
- Born: 5 April 1904 Birr, County Offaly, Ireland
- Died: 2 August 1983 (aged 79) Dorchester, Dorset, England
- Parents: Herbert Fetherstonhaugh Taylour (father); Helen Allardice Webb (mother)

Sport
- Sport: Motorcycle Racer

Fay Taylour (5 April 1904 – 2 August 1983), known as Flying Fay, was an Irish motorcyclist in the late 1920s and a champion speedway rider. She switched to racing cars in 1931. She was interned as a fascist during the Second World War. After the war, she managed to enter some races in the UK, Ireland, Sweden and Australia and took up midget car racing in the United States until she retired in the late 1950s.

== Early life ==
Helen Frances Taylour, known as Fay, was born in Birr, County Offaly, to Helen Allardice (née Webb) (1868/9–1925) and Herbert Fetherstonhaugh Taylour (1868/9–1952), a former colonel in the British army. Her family was well off by the standards of the time: her father was a district inspector in the RIC and they lived at Oxmanton Hall in the centre of Birr. One of her maternal aunts, Hilda Webb, was an active suffragette and a young Fay was taken to visit her when she was imprisoned in Holloway gaol. Her maternal uncle George Webb, was a mathematician and fellow of Trinity College Dublin, married to paediatrician Dr Ella Webb, founder of the Children's Sunshine Home in Stillorgan. Dublin.

Taylour was educated at Miss Fletcher's boarding school in Fitzwilliam Square, Dublin, and in 1919 went to Alexandra College, then in Earlsfort Terrace, where the Conrad Hotel now stands. She left school in 1922 and joined her family in Berkshire, where they had moved following the creation of the Irish Free State which had led to the end of the Royal Irish Constabulary, her father's employer. Her mother was terminally ill and Taylour looked after her and the home until her mother died in 1925. She had learned to drive a car at the age of 12 and learned how to ride a motorcycle in her new home. Following her mother's death, she used the prize money she had earned in school - a £50 prize for housecraft - to buy her first motorcycles.

== Motorcycling career ==
After leaving college, Taylour went to England and started to race motorcycles. During the 1920s, she took up motorcycle trials and grasstrack racing and became a major attraction. Then, in April 1928, on the opening of the new Leeds (Post Hill) speedway track, where she took part in a couple of races she changed course, favouring this latest form of motorcycling sports, which was very popular, more spectacular and it paid better. Already travelling the world, she became a familiar speedway competitor and a big attraction for the crowds in both England and Australia. One of her main racing rivals was Yorkshire woman Eva Askquith, against whom she regularly raced in hill climbs, grass tracks and, towards the end of the 1928 season, speedway.

In 1928, Taylour spent £500 of her own money to travel to race in Australia and New Zealand. She was the first rider from Europe to compete in Australia and New Zealand, ending her first race in Australia equalling the track record and beating Western Australia champion Sig Schlam. In Melbourne, she won against the local champion Reg West. She became popular with racing promoters as she could attract crowds of over 30,000 people to watch her race. Her popularity led to her appearing on cigarette cards, wearing scarlet racing leathers emblazoned with an Irish flag, and appearing on radio shows. Her motorcycle racing career came to an end when women were banned from competing in speedway, in the UK and then in Australia and New Zealand.

== Car racing ==
Taylour switched to racing cars in 1931. Competing in a women's handicap race at Brooklands in the autumn, driving a Talbot 105 and lapping at 107.80 mph. In a similar race at Brooklands in the autumn of the following year, she came second, lapping at 113.97 mph. After this particular race, in excitement she made several more very fast laps of the track, not stopping until a flagman stepped out in front of her 2.6-litre Monza Alfa Romeo. For this she was fined and disqualified. Taylour went to India in 1931 where she won her first major car race, setting a new course record for the Calcutta to Ranchi event.

In 1934, Taylour came home to Ireland and won the Leinster Trophy road race, in a front wheel drive Adler Trumpf. She was the only woman competitor in the race, as she had been when she drove a works Aston Martin in the Italian Mille Miglia. She also took part in 1934 in the Craigantlet hill climb in County Down. Her racing clothes were a jumper and a tweed skirt, according to a newspaper report of the event. Taylour said, that the day she met a man who was more difficult to handle than a racing car, she would probably give up racing. She remained unmarried.

Taylour raced in Ireland, England, Italy and Sweden. She also raced in the United States. Her last major race before the Second World War was with a Riley in the 1938 South African Grand Prix, where she received a hero's welcome for her spirited driving, even though she was unplaced.

== Second World War internment ==
In the late 1930s, Taylour became a follower of Oswald Mosley, the British fascist leader and joined the British Union of Fascists. Like Mosley, his wife, Diana Mitford and many other members of the party she was interned in Britain between 1 June 1940 and 5 October 1943 under Defence Regulation 18B, as a danger to the state. She was held without trial, first at Holloway gaol, where her aunt had once been imprisoned for suffragette activities, then in 1942 in a camp on the Isle of Man. She was released in 1943 on the condition that she live in neutral Eire, where she continued to be monitored by MI5.

== Post war and later life ==
Taylour became the only leading woman driver from pre-war days to resume racing after the war, when she returned to racing on circuits around the world, although her appearances became fewer. Usually, however, she was the only woman to take part. Her fascist affiliations were omitted from her post-war publicity.

In 1949, Taylour moved to Hollywood, where she sold British cars. In the US, she discovered the popular sport of midget car racing on dirt tracks. During the 1950s, she was still racing with a 500 cc Cooper at major British circuits like Brands Hatch and Silverstone. By this time she was competing against a new generation of young drivers including Stirling Moss and Peter Collins.

After retirement in the late 1950s, Taylour went to live at Blandford in Dorset. In March 1976 the British security services closed their file on her.

Taylour died from a stroke at the Dorset County Hospital, Dorchester, on 2 August 1983. She left her body to medical research.
