= Eva Askquith =

British motorcycle racer

- Born: 1905; Bedale, North Riding of Yorkshire, England
- Died: 1985 (aged 79–80); Bedale, North Yorkshire, England
- Other names: The Yorkshire Rose, Miss Eva
- Occupation: Motorcycle racer
- Years active: 1928–1932
- Known for: Pioneer female speedway motorcycle racer from 1928 to 1930

Eva Askquith (1905–1985), at times misspelt as Ashquith or Asquith, was a pioneering British female speedway motorcycle racer in the three seasons from 1928 and 1930 when female riders were allowed race speedway in Britain. She was one of only four British female speedway riders at this time and also raced internationally.

== Early life and early motorcycle trail racing ==
Born in 1905 in Bedale in North Riding of Yorkshire, Askquith was daughter of Charlie Askquith, a butcher. Some sources suggest she was a despatch rider during the First World War but this seems unlikely given she was 13 years of age when the war ended in 1918. This confusion may have arisen as she served as a despatch rider for the Auxiliary Fire Service during the Second World War.

In the early 1920s, Askquith was a keen, competitive and talented horse rider from an early age, winning cups for riding in local shows and at point-to-point events including the Bedale Derby in 1923. These skills may have eased her transition into motorcycle racing, when she took it up in the mid-1920s. She got a chance to ride a 350cc Matchless, borrowing it from a haulage man. Around 1926, Askquith acquired a small 250cc New Imperial motorcycle for £3 with a friend Elsie Clarkson but never got to ride it as the motorcycle caught fire and was destroyed as her friend rode it around a field. In 1926, Askquith bought her own motorcycle and in 1927 she entered the notorious and gruelling Scott Trial in nearby Swaledale – famous for being the largest one-day trial in the country – on an AJS TT Special. Just completing this gruelling local event was an achievement and Askquith went on to complete the Scottish six-day trial, winning a competitor's medal awarded only to those who finished. She also came second in a motorcycle trial from York to Edinburgh and back, which had to be completed in 24 hours or less.

In February 1928, Askquith was one of only four female riders (up from none the previous year) to ride the £200 100-mile reliability trial organised by Leeds Motor Club but not one of the 100 solo riders got through the muddy trial with a clean sheet, Askquith and the three other female riders included.

By June 1928, Askquith had acquired a new motorcycle, a Velocette, which was better suited to the trails she was competing in and used it to compete on grass courts and on the special hill runs at Post Hill and Dalton Bank. Askquith did not make the finals of the Dalton Bank hill climb but did win the Ladies Trophy for the fastest time in the hilltop race at Post Hill. In August 1928, Askquith defeated Irish motorcycle champion Fay Taylour at Rochdale grass track.

== Speedway racing ==
On 5 September 1928, shortly before the British speedway calendar was coming to a close, Askquith made the switch to speedway motorcycle racing, competing on outdoor circuits with dirt and grass tracks. Her main competition was Irish motorcycle champion Fay Taylour, with whom she had raced previously in hill climbs and grass tracks. Askquith first competed at Middlesbrough speedway track in a handicap scratch race against Taylour and, shortly afterwards, at Leeds where she won two heats in a junior handicap race with the prize money enabling to buy a Douglas DT 500.

In the 1929 and 1930 seasons, Askquith raced at Wembley and also travelled the world to win a clutch of cups and medals against competition from top male riders. In 1929, Askquith travelled to Copenhagen to race at the dirt track of Roskildevej before over 10,000 spectators. Askquith also raced internationally in South Africa, where she was the first female dirt track rider in South Africa and was known as "the Yorkshire Rose." Between the 1929 and 1930 racing seasons, Ackquith departed on a world tour to compete on three continents – first Australia, then America, and concluding with speedway races in Europe in Italy and Spain.

In April 1930 season, it was announced that women would not be allowed to compete in speedway racing in Britain due to concerns about women's safety and the "unladylike" nature of speedway racing. Nonetheless Askquith continued racing internationally including in Spain, where she once took a picador as pillion passenger around the ring pursued by a bull and where she was known simply as "Miss Eva".

== Later life and legacy ==
During the Second World War, Askquith served as a despatch rider for the Auxiliary Fire Service and was appointed first engineer of the auxiliary petrol pump, due to her pre-war knowledge of the petrol engine.

Askquith was injured while helping her father, Charlie Askquith, to deliver meat in his van and never returned to motorcycle racing, choosing to focus on gardening instead. Askquith competed in gardening with the same grit and determination she had shown in speedway – she won numerous medals awarded by the National Dahlia Society and the National Vegetable Society and entered many local horticultural shows. She won 21 first prizes at Ripon Show in 1958. In 1968, Askquith gave a cup to the Bedale Gardening Society to be awarded annually to the winner of monthly points competitions.

Askquith died in 1985, just one day short of her 80th birthday; she was unmarried and had no children.

Askquith is commemorated on an art panel on the Old Assembly Rooms in her home town of Bedale, in a display at Bedale Museum and features in the town's Heritage Trail.
