= R. B. McDowell =

Irish historian (1913–2011)

R. B. McDowell MRIA
- Born: 14 September 1913
- Died: 29 August 2011 (aged 97)
- Education: Trinity College, Dublin

Robert Brendan McDowell MRIA (14 September 1913 – 29 August 2011) was an Irish historian. He was a Fellow Emeritus and a former Associate Professor of History at Trinity College Dublin. He was born in Belfast. He was referred to colloquially as "RB", "McDowell" or "the White Rabbit". His politics were strongly Unionist and he was a member of the British Conservative Party.

== University career ==
McDowell was educated at the Royal Belfast Academical Institution, where he discovered his love of history. Here he met T. W. Moody, later an esteemed colleague in the History department at Trinity. He completed his graduate work at Trinity, having been elected a Scholar in Modern History and Political Science in 1936. He was first appointed a lecturer in Trinity in 1945, and for 13 years (1956–1969) was the Junior Dean of Students, or "Dean of Discipline", a role that involved disciplining students in the tumultuous 1960s and resulted in many amusing anecdotes. He resided in the college until the age of 94, when he retired to Celbridge.

In 2007, the College Historical Society, of which McDowell was a vice-president, unveiled a portrait of McDowell, which can be seen in the Graduates' Memorial Building, alongside Douglas Hyde and Theobald Wolfe Tone, amongst others.

== Bibliography ==
McDowell's published work concentrated on the era when Britain and Ireland shared a government, and aspects of the Irish-British relationship.

- Irish Historical Documents, 1172-1922 [with Edmund Curtis] (Dublin: Irish Manuscripts Commission,1943; reprinted, London: Methuen, 1977)
- Irish Public Opinion, 1750-1800 (London: Faber & Faber, 1944)
- British Conservatism, 1832-1914 (London: Faber & Faber, 1959)
- The Irish Administration, 1801-1914 (London: Routledge & Kegan Paul, 1964)
- Alice Stopford Green: a passionate historian (Dublin: Allen Figgis, 1967)
- The Correspondence of Edmund Burke (Cambridge: Cambridge University Press, 1969-1970)
- The Irish Convention, 1917-18 (London: Routledge & Kegan Paul, 1970)
- The Church of Ireland, 1869-1969 (London: Routledge & Kegan Paul, 1975)
- Public Opinion and Government Policy in Ireland, 1801-1846 (Westport: Greenwood Press, 1975)
- Mahaffy: a biography of an Anglo-Irishman [with W. B. Stanford] (London: Routledge & Kegan Paul, 1975)
- Social Life in Ireland, 1800-45 (Cork: Mercier Press, 1976)
- Ireland in the Age of Imperialism and Revolution, 1760-1801 (Oxford: Clarendon Press, 1979)
- Trinity College Dublin, 1592-1952: an academic history [with D. A. Webb] (Cambridge: Cambridge University Press, 1982)
- Burke and Ireland essay in The United Irishmen ed. David Dickson, Dáire Keogh and Kevin Whelan (Dublin: Lilliput Press, 1993)
- Land and Learning; Two Irish Clubs (Dublin: Lilliput Press, 1993)
- Crisis and Decline: the fate of the Southern Unionists (Dublin: Lilliput Press, 1998)
- The Writings of Theobald Wolfe Tone [with T. W. Moody & C. J. Woods] (Oxford: Clarendon Press, 1998-2007)
- Proceedings of the Dublin Society of the United Irishmen (Dublin: Irish Manuscripts Commission, 1998). ISBN 1-874280-16-9
- Grattan: a life (Dublin: Lilliput Press, 2001) ISBN 978-1-901866-72-8
- Historical Essays, 1938-2001 (Dublin: Lilliput Press, 2003)
- Trinity College, Dublin, 1592-1952: an academic history, by R. B. McDowell (Author), David A. Webb (Author), F. S. L. Lyons (Foreword), Cambridge: Cambridge University Press, 1982 ISBN 978-0-521-23931-8
- McDowell on McDowell: a memoir (Dublin: Lilliput Press, 2012)

== Books about McDowell ==
As well as his scholarship, McDowell became celebrated for his eccentric dress, his Ulster diction and his ability to talk knowledgeably at great length. Hundreds of anecdotes by former colleagues and students were published in 2 volumes after his retirement:

- The Junior Dean, R B McDowell: Encounters with a Legend (Lilliput Press, 2003) to celebrate his 90th birthday;
- The Magnificent McDowell: Trinity in the Golden Era (Eccleston Press, 2006). Both books are edited by Anne Leonard, a graduate of Trinity College Dublin.
