= D. A. Webb =

Irish botanist

David Allardice Webb
- Born: 12 August 1912; Dublin, Ireland
- Died: 26 September 1994 (aged 82); Oxford, England
- Scientific career
- Fields: Botany
- Workplaces: Trinity College Dublin

David Allardice Webb (12 August 1912 – 26 September 1994) was an Irish botanist and chair of botany at Trinity College, Dublin from 1949 to 1966. He was son of George and Dr Ella Webb. He studied botany at Trinity under Henry Horatio Dixon, later completing a PhD at Cambridge University. In addition to his botanical work, he edited a history of Trinity College with R. B. McDowell, and published a book on the history of art in Trinity College. In 1982 he received the Boyle Medal of the Royal Dublin Society. His botanical specialties included his work as a leading taxonomist of Saxifraga. He died in a car accident on his way to the University of Reading's herbarium. The eighth edition of An Irish Flora was renamed Webb's An Irish Flora in his honour.

== Publications ==
- Webb, D.A. 1943. An Irish Flora. 1st ed. W. Tempest, Dundalgan Press. Dundalk.
- ——— and Hart, A.V. 1945. Contributions towards an understanding of the calcicole and calcifuge habit in some Irish plants. Sci. Proc. Roy. Dublin Soc. N.S. 25, 19 – 28.
- ——— 1952. The flora and vegetation of Ireland in Die Pflanzebwelt Irlands." Veroff. Geobot. Inst. Rubels, Zurich, 25 H, 46–84.
- ——— 1977. An Irish Flora 6th ed. Dundalgan Press (W.Tempest) Ltd, Dundalk.
- ——— 1954. Notes on four Irish heaths Part 1 Erica mackaiana. Ir Nat, J. 11: 187–192.
- ——— 1955. Biological flora of the British Isles. Erica mackaiana, Journal of Ecology. 43: 319–330.
- ——— 1980. The flora of the Aran Islands. Journal Life Sciences, Royal Dublin Society. 2: 51–83.
- ——— and Hodgson, J. 1968. The Flora of Inishbofin and Inishark. Proceedings of the Botanical Society of the British Isles. 7: 345–363.
- ——— and Scannell, M.J.P. 1983. Flora of Connemara and the Burren. Royal Dublin Society & Cambridge University Press, Cambridge.
- ——— and Scannell, M.J.P. 1984. Flora of Connemara and the Burren; some corrections and additions. Ir. Nat.J. 21: 286–288.
- ———, Doogue, D. and Parnell, J. 1996. An Irish Flora. 7th ed Dundalgan Press (W. Tempest) Ltd, Dundalk.
