= Austin 18 =

Austin Eighteen Iver, Windsor and Norfolk
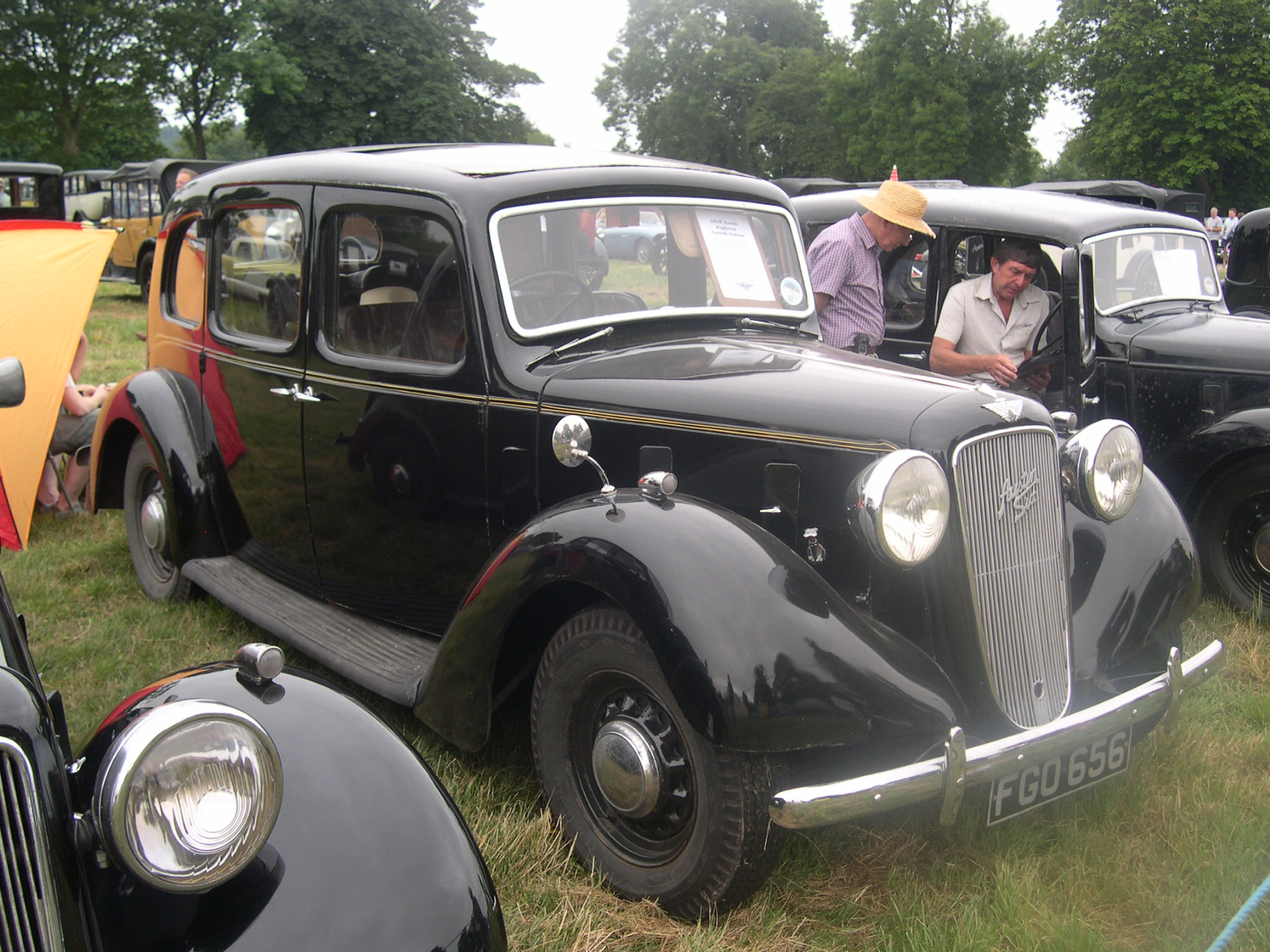
- Norfolk 5-seater first registered October 1938

Overview
- Manufacturer: Austin
- Production: July 1937 – September 1939; Quantity (sold); Longbridge

Body and chassis
- Body style: saloon: Norfolk 5-seater, Windsor 7-seater LWB with division: Iver LWB

Powertrain
- Engine: 2,510 cc (153 cu in) Straight-six
- Transmission: in one unit with the engine: single-plate clutch, 4-speed centrally controlled gearbox with synchromesh on 2, 3 & top.Three quarter floating rear axle

Dimensions
- Wheelbase: SWB: 112.5 in (2,860 mm); LWB: 123 in (3,100 mm); Track front: 58 in (1,500 mm); Track rear: 58.5 in (1,490 mm)
- Kerb weight: Windsor LWB: 32 long cwt (3,584 lb; 1,626 kg)

Chronology
- Predecessor: Austin Sixteen 16 or 18 hp
- Successor: Austin Sheerline

Austin Eighteen engine

Overview
- Manufacturer: Austin
- Production: Longbridge

Layout
- Configuration: Straight 6-cylinder
- Displacement: 2,510 cc (153 cu in)
- Cylinder bore: 69.35 mm (2.730 in)
- Piston stroke: 111 mm (4.4 in)
- Cylinder block material: Cast iron. Aluminium pistons with anodised surfaces. Four-bearing crankshaft
- Cylinder head material: aluminium, detachable
- Valvetrain: inclined side valves, inlet larger than exhaust
- Compression ratio: 6.5:1

Combustion
- Fuel system: downdraught carburettor with hot spot induction and new manifolding
- Oil system: floating filter pick up for the oil pump and anti-surge valve
- Cooling system: forced water circulation thermostatically controlled

Output
- Power output: 65 bhp (48 kW; 66 PS) @3,400 rpm Tax horsepower 17.9

Chronology
- Predecessor: Austin Sixteen 18 hp engine
- Successor: Austin Sheerline 3460 cc and 3995 cc

The Austin Eighteen is a large saloon car, supplied in two different wheelbases to carry five or seven passengers, that was introduced by Austin on 14 July 1937. Its engine and front seat were mounted nine inches (230 mm) further forward than on the old York Sixteen it replaced. The chassis was also extended three inches (76 mm) to provide a total of twelve inches (300 mm) more passenger space. One result was a relatively short bonnet and a good driving position. Its new shape followed the lines of the other Austin cars introduced the previous autumn and it was remarkable for having a completely flat floor in both front and rear passenger compartments with exceptionally wide doors and draught-free ventilation.

== Chassis ==
The engine and gearbox unit had four live rubber mountings and the silencer and exhaust pipe were similarly insulated. The frame was rigidly cross braced with the deep side members dropped in order to give a low body mounting. Where the cross bracings ran into the side members they were welded to form a box section which gave stiffness.

=== Engine ===
The engine, carried forward from the 18 h.p. York model of the Sixteen had received small improvements which increased the engine's output. The engine benefited from improvements to the 12 hp engine found in the new Ascot of 1936. The crankshaft is supported on 4 bearings and the main and big end bearings are of the shell type. The 1938 season engine benefited from higher compression, bigger valves and an aluminium cylinder head with thermostat fitted. These often cracked upon removal.

=== Gearbox ===
Austin own design 4 speed with synchromesh on 2nd, 3rd and top (dog clutch). Borg and Beck dry plate clutch and 2 piece propshaft, supported in a central rubber-mounted bearing.

=== Braking ===
Braking is provided through Girling rod brakes, with a similar design found on the Austin 14 Goodwood.

=== Steering ===
The steering column was adjustable for length. The steering system by Marles-Weller had been improved. Because the engine had moved forward the track rod was now forward of the front axle.

=== Suspension ===
The low periodicity half-elliptical springs were zinc interleaved with oilite self-lubrication discs at the end of the main leaves. Oil could be fed between the leaves by grease gun through a nipple under each spring.

Norfolk 5-seater first registered February 1939
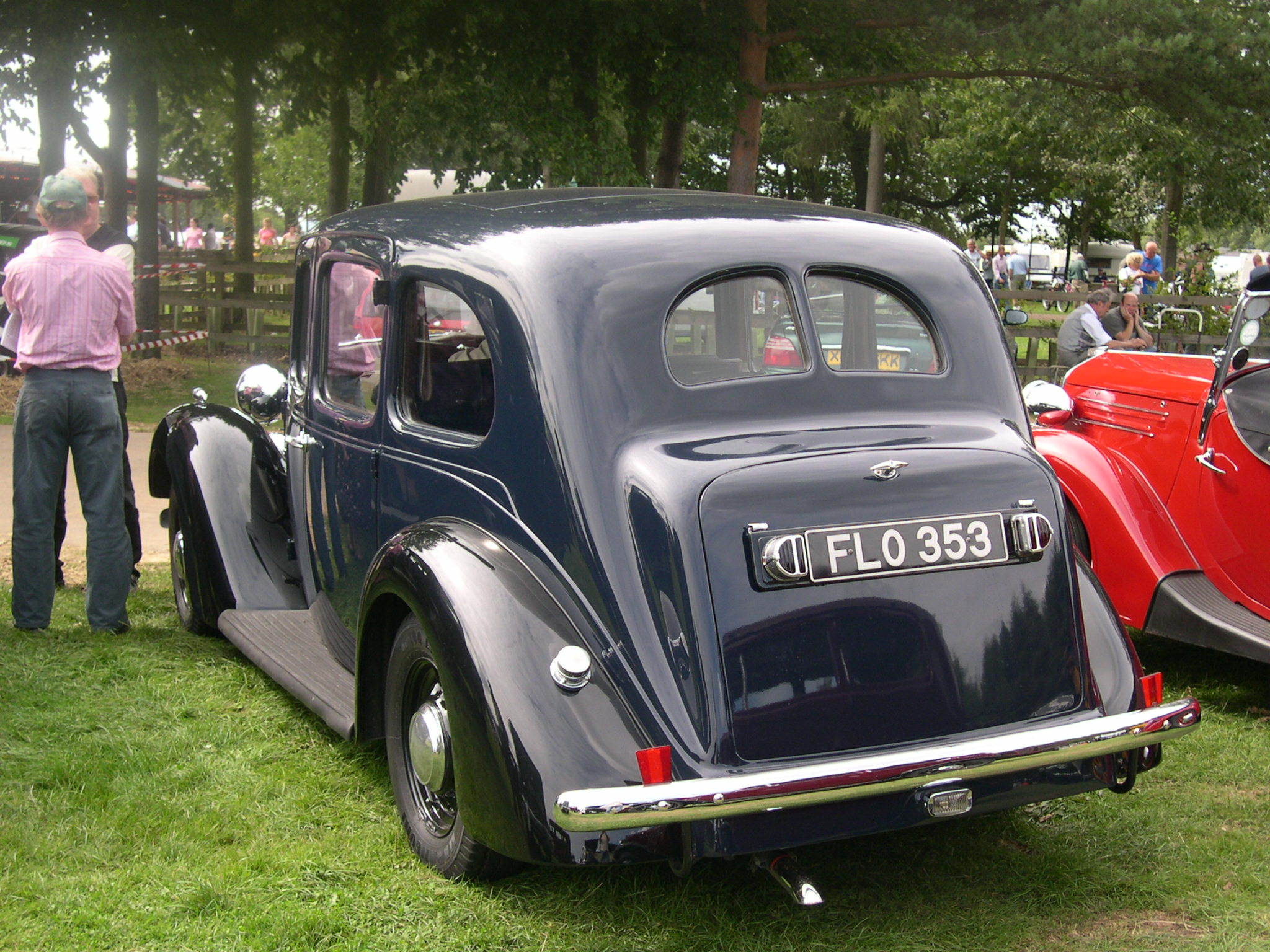
rear view

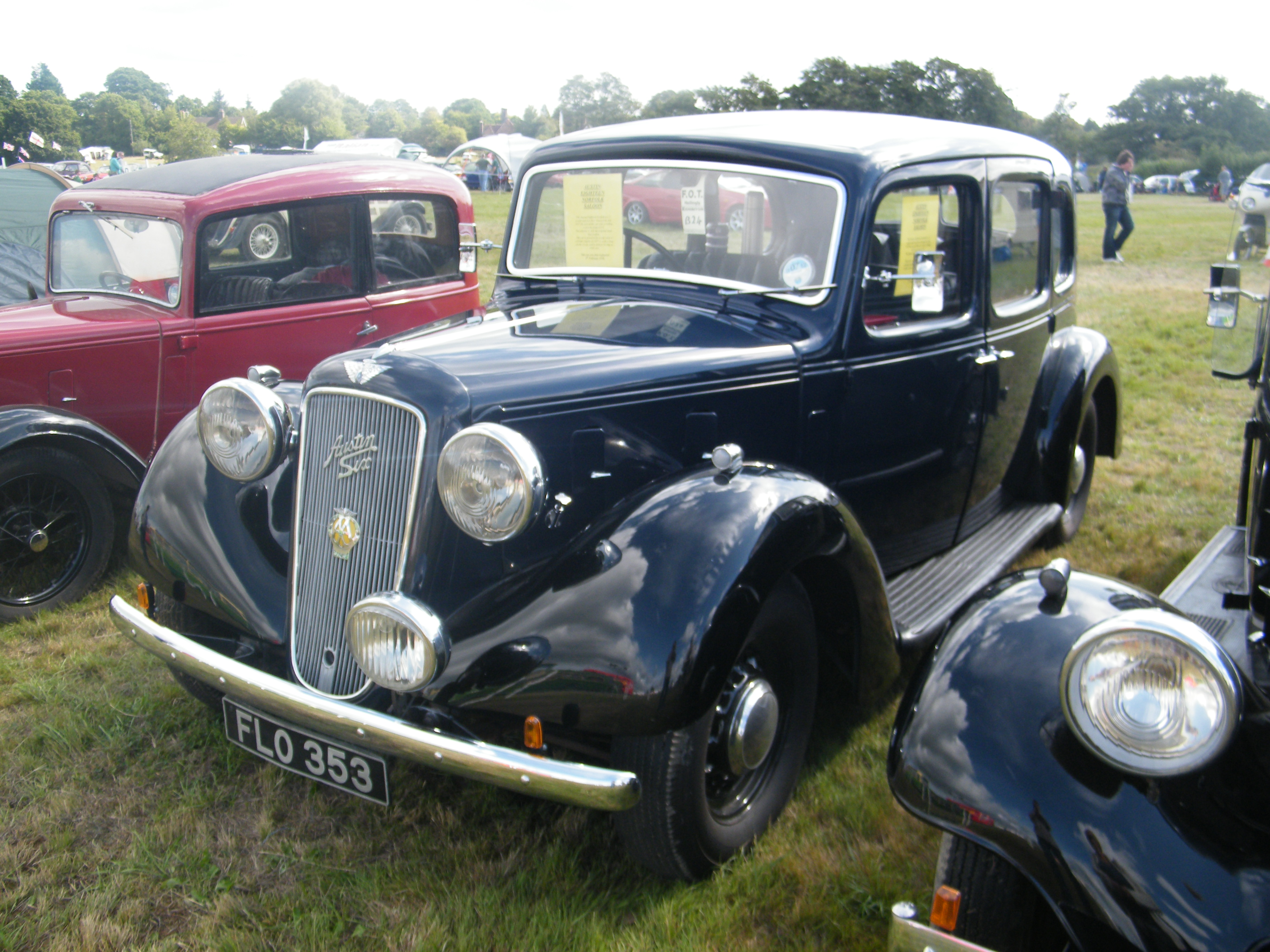
front view

== Road test ==
The Windsor car, roomy and well-proportioned, has unusually wide and deep side-windows. . . . There are two good-sized suitcases in the boot above a separate compartment for the spare wheel and tyre and room for extra luggage on the platform made by the open boot door. . . . Seating is generous and head clearance "most satisfactory". The folding occasional seats are comfortable within their limits. . . ."The engine is much helped by the latest (cylinder) head towards a greater and smoother delivery of power". Acceleration and speed was rated as adequate in view of the reliable and economical usage for which the car was intended. The brakes were "powerful".
Motoring Correspondent, The Times

Bletchley Park ambulance
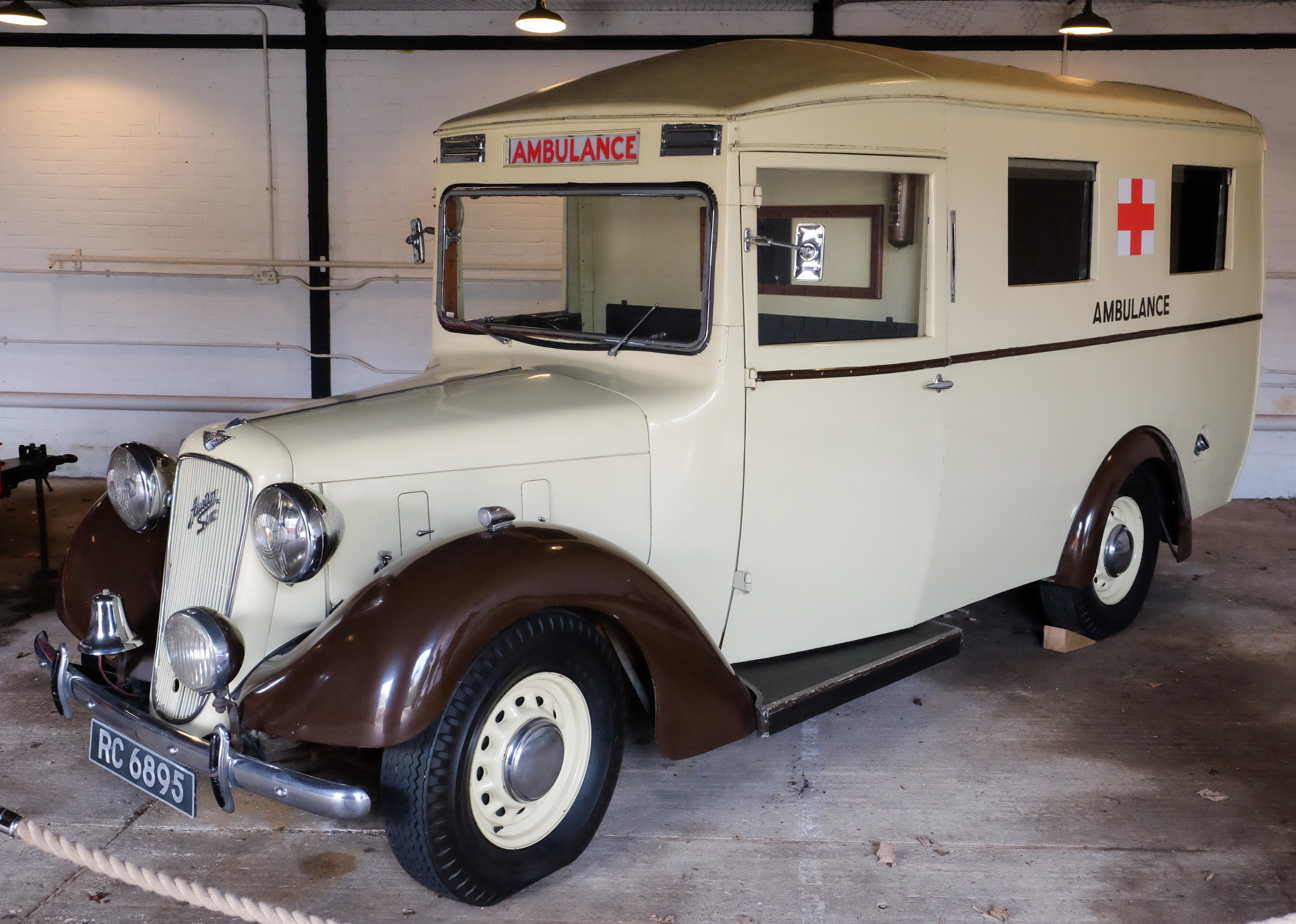
Austin 18 Six Cylinder Ambulance, 1938

Ambulance body on a 1939 Austin 18 chassis

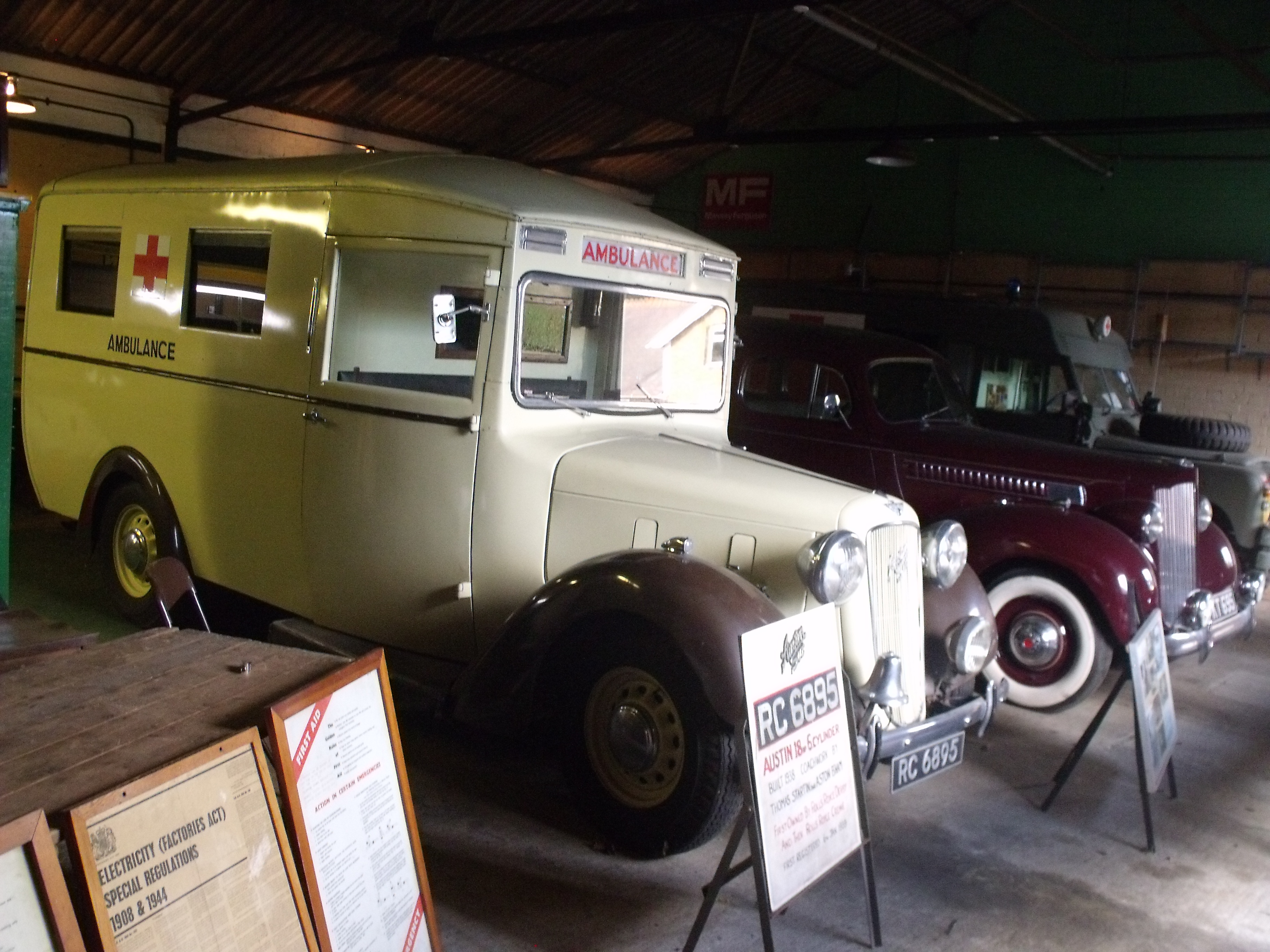
Austin 18 Ambulance, 1939

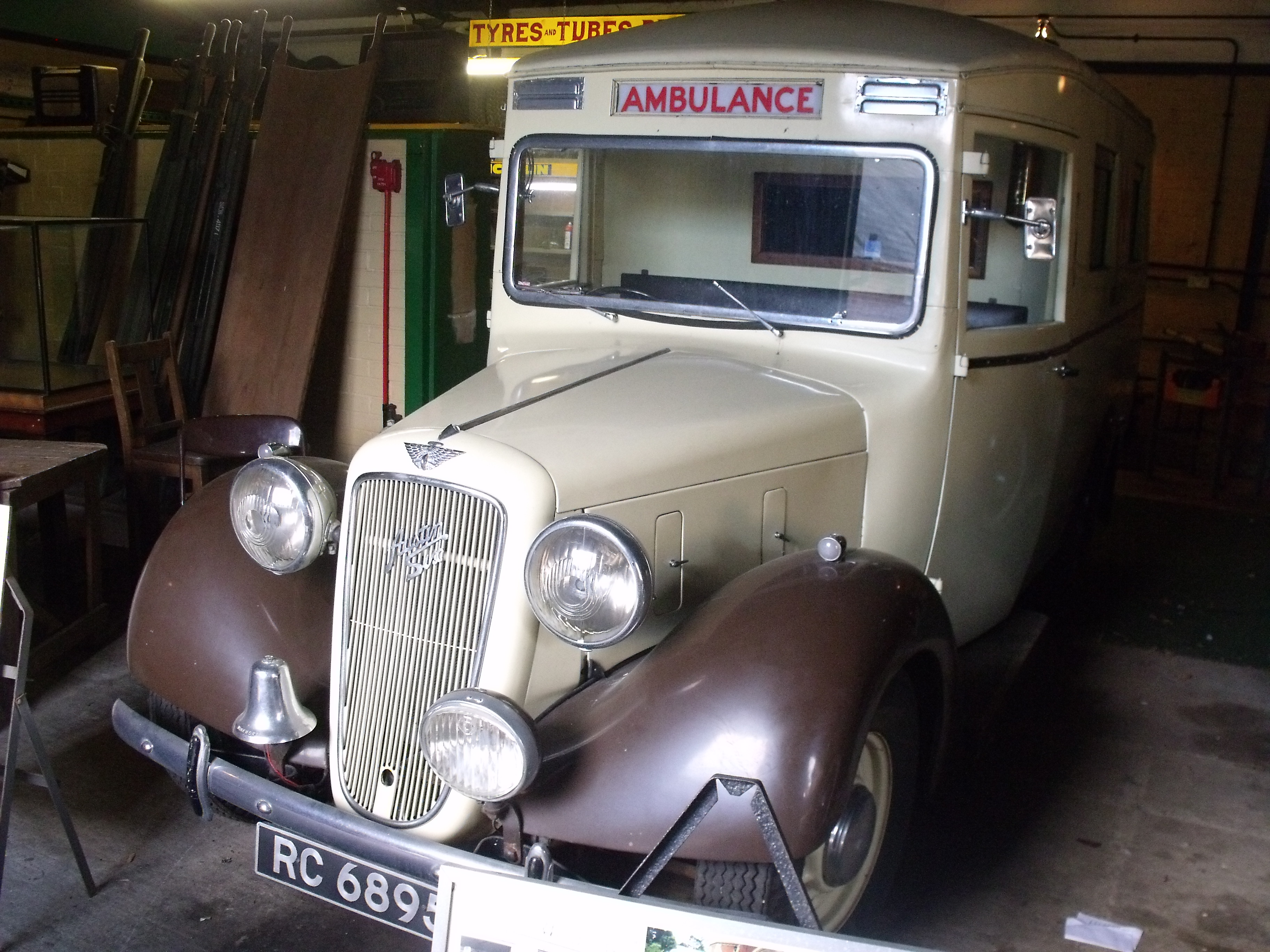
Austin Ambulance dating from 1938 / 1939
