= Austin 16 =

Austin Sixteen Light Six
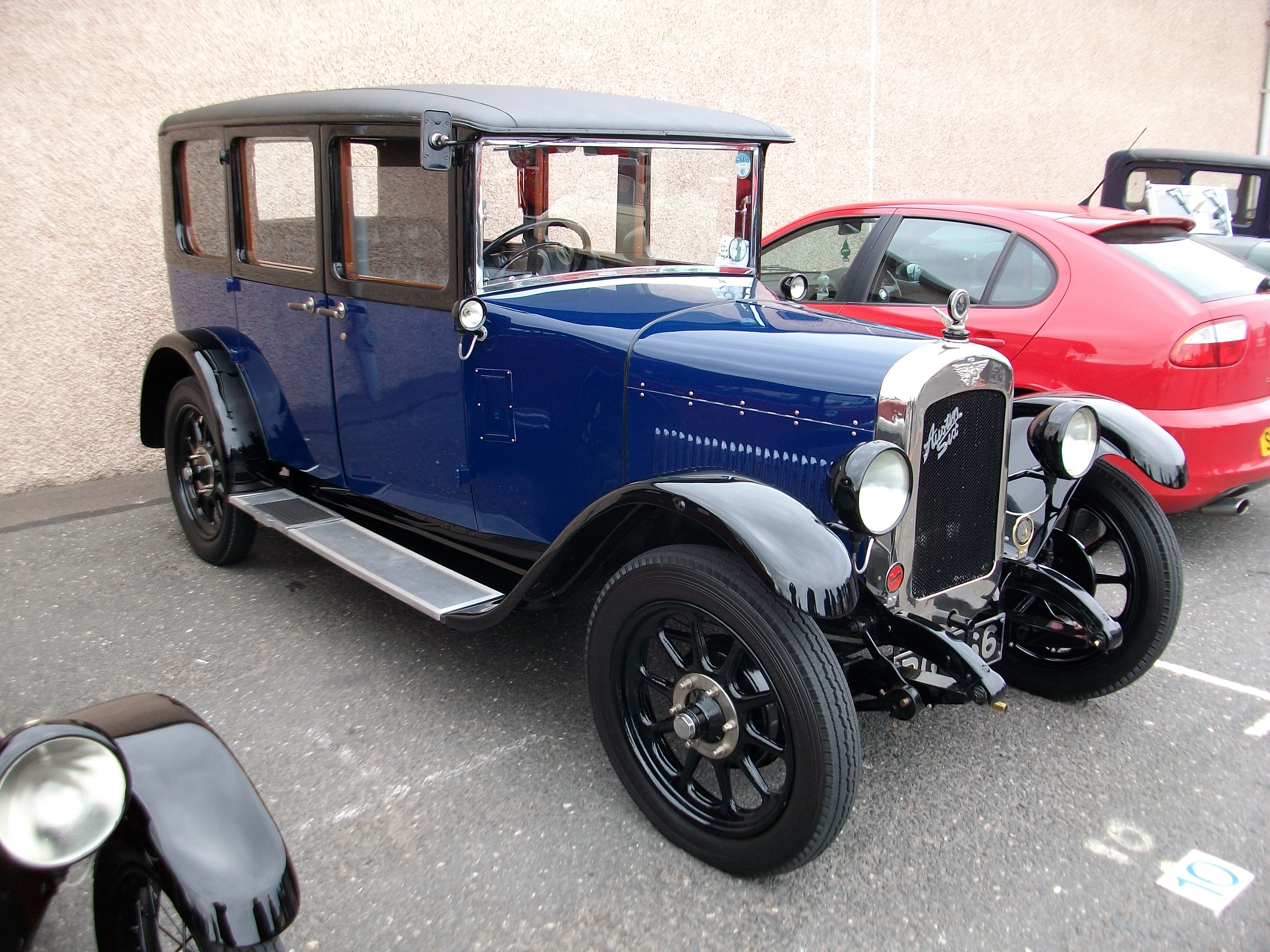
- Sixteen Light Six Burnham saloon 1929

Overview
- Manufacturer: Austin
- Production: 1927–1937

Body and chassis
- Body style: see detail in text most popular: tourer—Open Road saloon—Burnham —> Westminster

Powertrain
- Engine: 2249 cc or 2510 cc 6-cylinder side-valve
- Transmission: single plate dry clutch, gearbox 4-speed manual fitted behind with a locomotive contracting brake. Drive is taken by an open propeller shaft at the front by a Hardy type joint and rear by a metal universal to the three quarter floating back axle

Dimensions
- Wheelbase: 112 in (2,800 mm) track 4' 8", 56 in (1,400 mm)
- Kerb weight: Chassis only 14 long cwt (1,568 lb; 711 kg); Windsor saloon 25 1/4 long cwt (2,828 lb; 1,283 kg); York long wheelbase saloon 31 1/2 long cwt (3,528 lb; 1,600 kg)

Chronology
- Predecessor: none
- Successor: Austin Eighteen 1938-39

Austin Sixteen engine Light Six 2249 cc

Overview
- Manufacturer: Austin
- Production: late 1927–1937

Layout
- Configuration: Straight 6-cylinder
- Displacement: 2,249 cc (137 cu in)
- Cylinder bore: 65.5 mm (2.58 in)
- Piston stroke: 111 mm (4.4 in)
- Cylinder block material: cast iron, alloy crankcase, crankshaft runs in 8 bearings
- Cylinder head material: detachable, pistons are aluminium
- Valvetrain: side-by-side valves, tappet covers may be easily removed, timing is driven by chain

Combustion
- Fuel system: single down-draught carburettor supplied by Autovac which draws from a reservoir beneath the driver's seat, ignition by magneto driven by chain placed behind the timing, dynamo driven by same chain
- Fuel type: petrol
- Oil system: lubrication by forced feed, filler on the offside
- Cooling system: radiator, fan, cooling water is circulated by a pump forward of the timing on the nearside

Output
- Power output: 36 bhp (27 kW; 36 PS) @2,400 rpm Tax horsepower 15.96

Austin 18 hp engine 2510 cc

Overview
- Manufacturer: Austin
- Production: mid-1934–1939 see Austin 18

Layout
- Configuration: Straight 6-cylinder
- Displacement: 2,501 cc (153 cu in)
- Cylinder bore: 69.5 mm (2.74 in)
- Piston stroke: 111 mm (4.4 in)
- Cylinder block material: cast iron, cast in one piece with crankcase, crankshaft runs in 4 bearings, it is counter-balanced and has a vibration damper. Engine mountings employ rubber bushes within bosses secured to flat steel plates bolted to the cylinder casting.
- Cylinder head material: detachable, pistons are aluminium
- Valvetrain: side-by-side valves, tappet covers may be easily removed, timing is driven by chain

Combustion
- Fuel system: single carburettor supplied by Autovac which draws from a reservoir beneath the driver's seat, ignition by magneto driven by chain placed behind the timing, dynamo driven by same chain
- Fuel type: petrol
- Oil system: lubrication by forced feed, filler on the offside
- Cooling system: radiator, fan, cooling water is circulated by a pump forward of the timing on the nearside

Output
- Power output: 43 bhp (32 kW; 44 PS) @2,600 rpm Tax horsepower 17.9

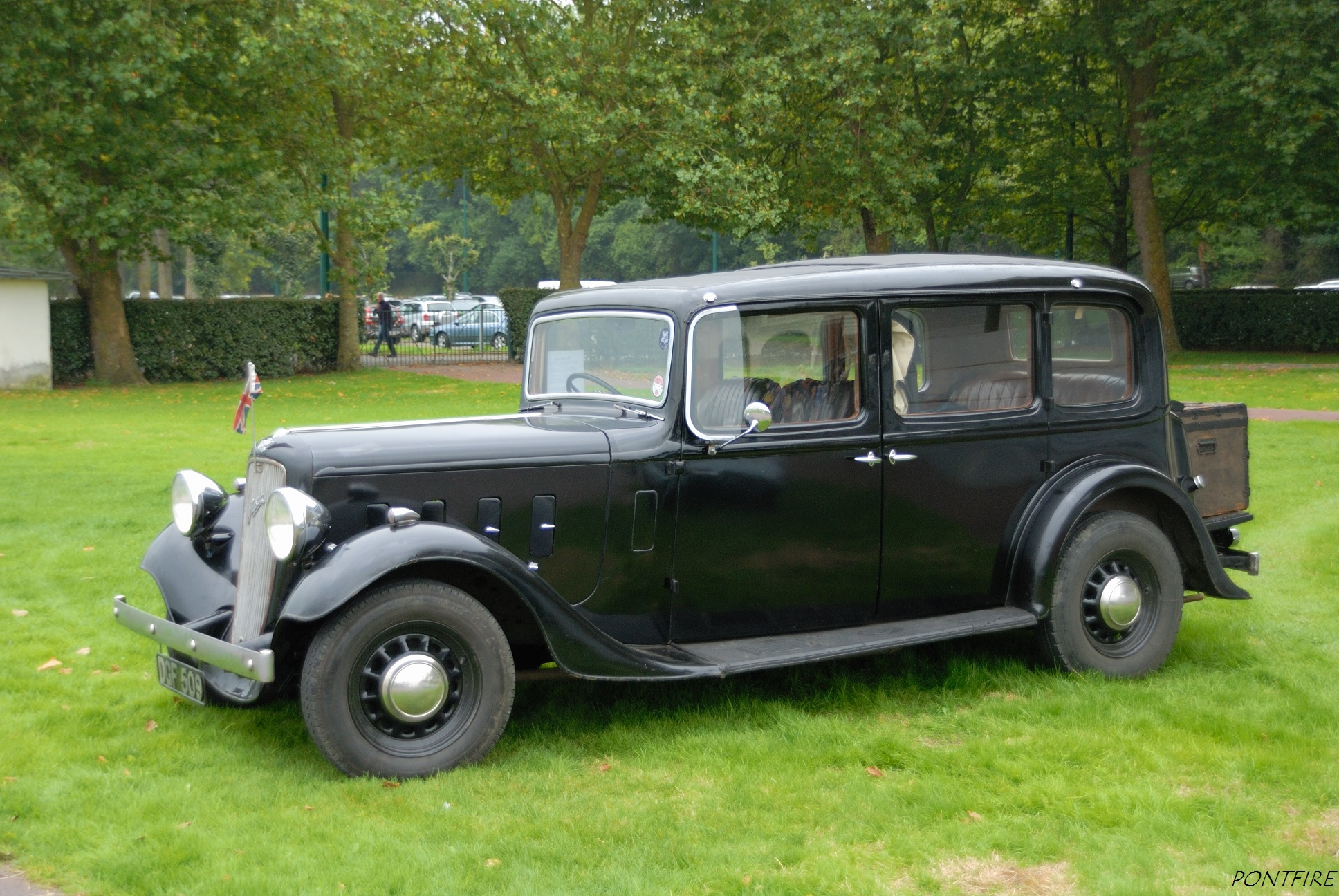
Chalfont Sixteen 18 hp limousine 1936

The Austin Sixteen Light Six is a British car that was made by Austin from 1927. Announced in October 1927, the first deliveries were planned for March 1928.

To distinguish the car from the smaller engined models in the range a plated Austin Six script was fixed to the radiator grille.

== 1927 ==
The Austin Sixteen was announced as a medium saloon sitting within Austin's range above the Seven and Twelve models but still much smaller than the 3.6 Litre Twenty.

The first Austin Sixteens were not available until 1928 when they were released to the market.

The six-cylinder engine was new but had similarities to the engine fitted to the Twenty with its timing chain at the rear of the block. The design was up to date with the gearbox mounted in-unit with the engine and semi elliptic springs all round for the suspension. Triplex safety glass was fitted to all front screens from March 1929.

A wide range of body types was available at first but was simplified over the years. The coupés went first in 1930 followed by the Weymann type fabric saloons in 1931.

== 1934 ==
In August 1933 various improvements were announced for 1934 models. The gearbox gained synchromesh on 3rd and 4th gears and an alternative larger (2511 cc) 18 hp engine was made available at no extra charge. An early automatic gearbox was available between 1934 and 1936 but few sold. A longer 120 in (3,000 mm) wheelbase chassis became an option.

Of this version 5742 16s and 2630 18s were made.

=== Hayes selfselector transmission ===
"This provides a drive which is automatic in variation of ratio within limits, easily set by a finger and thumb lever on the top of the steering wheel. The actual transmission is through steel rollers which transmit the drive between curved steel races, the ratio being altered by rocking the rollers to different driving positions to engage with differing diameters of the driving and driven races. There are no gears—except for reverse—and a wide variation in ratios is available automatically. The driving rollers are rocked or precessed to give varying ratios by hydraulic means and the driver by his little lever can modify the performance as road conditions require. Subject to the control setting, the automatic functioning ensures a constant engine speed whatever the tractive resistance met with on the road, the transmission varying its ratio to balance the resistance as it increases or decreases. The engine speed by creating oil pressure in the hydraulic control system, tends to precess the rollers to give a high ratio drive. This is counterbalanced by the reaction of the tractive resistance, which tends to give a low ratio precession. A valve worked by the movement of the forward and reverse lever which engages the drive —in the ordinary way and is centrally placed like the ordinary speed lever—releases the pressure in the hydraulic control unit when the lever is in its neutral and reverse positions, so that the drive is always at low ratio for starting from rest or reversing.

"The finger and thumb control lever works in a small quadrant which is marked at the top "Traffic" then "High" and at the bottom "Low" and finally "Cold" with spaces in between. Variations of this lever govern engine speeds. The forward, neutral and reverse positions for the central hand lever are stepped. To start the car from rest a driver presses out his clutch, moves his hand lever forward, and lets in the clutch in the ordinary way with slight acceleration. Thereafter the whole of the drive is done with the accelerator pedal, the accelerator allowing the engine to run up and keep constant maximum speed governed by the control lever on the top of the steering wheel by which engine braking power can also be regulated. When the accelerator is pressed after being released the effect is rather similar to that with a free wheel in use, in that the engine picks up to the speed that is suitable to the drive. The engine is available as a brake, and greater power of this kind can be had by moving the control lever down towards low"
Motoring correspondent, The Times

== 1935 ==
Further upgrades were made in 1935. The body range was simplified and now had only the 5 and 7 seat saloons. Externally the most obvious change was to the radiator surround which was painted body colour rather than chrome plated, and a small external boot was added to the rear which contained the spare wheel. Synchromesh was added to second gear. The larger engine was modified to have only four rather than eight main bearings.

1936	Westminster saloon (4-light) 18 or 16 hp	Chalfont saloon (6-light) with division 18 or 16 hp	York saloon (6-light) 18 or 16 hp	Hertford saloon (6-light) 18 or 16 hp
length	168 in (4,300 mm)	176 in (4,500 mm)	176 in (4,500 mm)	168 in (4,300 mm)
width	68.5 in (1,740 mm)	68.5 in (1,740 mm)	68.5 in (1,740 mm)	68.5 in (1,740 mm)
height	70.5 in (1,790 mm)	75 in (1,900 mm)	70.5 in (1,790 mm)	70.5 in (1,790 mm)
wheelbase	112 in (2,800 mm)	120 in (3,000 mm)	120 in (3,000 mm)	112 in (2,800 mm)

== 1937 ==
In 1937, the last year this car was made, the smaller engined Sixteen was dropped and pressed steel road wheels replaced the previously fitted wire wheels.

Between 1935 and 1937 12,731 were produced.

== Performance ==
The 16 hp engined car could reach 60 mph (97 km/h) and return 21 miles per imperial gallon (13 L/100 km; 17 mpg_{‑US}) depending on the body fitted.

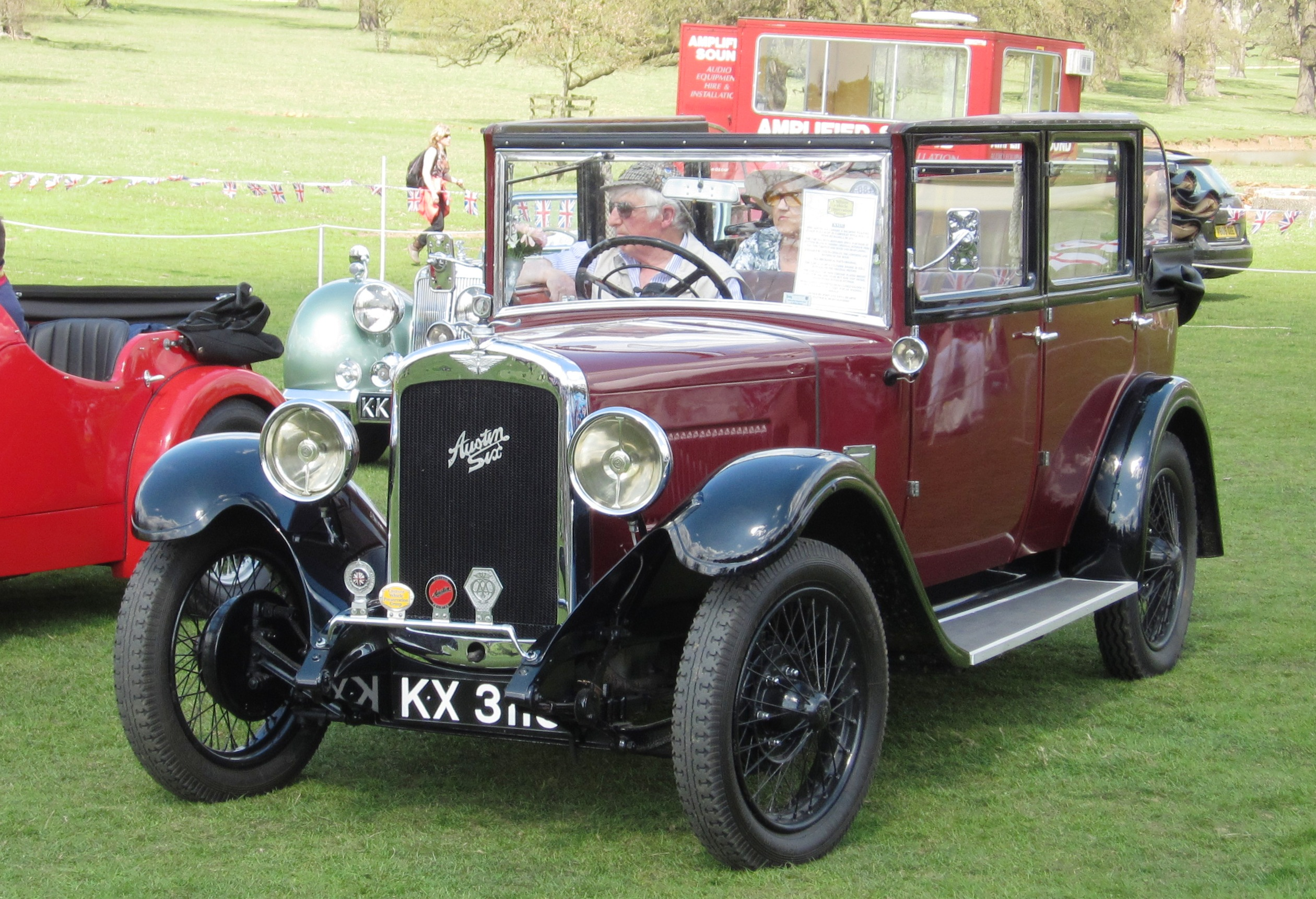
Sixteen with Tickford
body by Salmons 1929

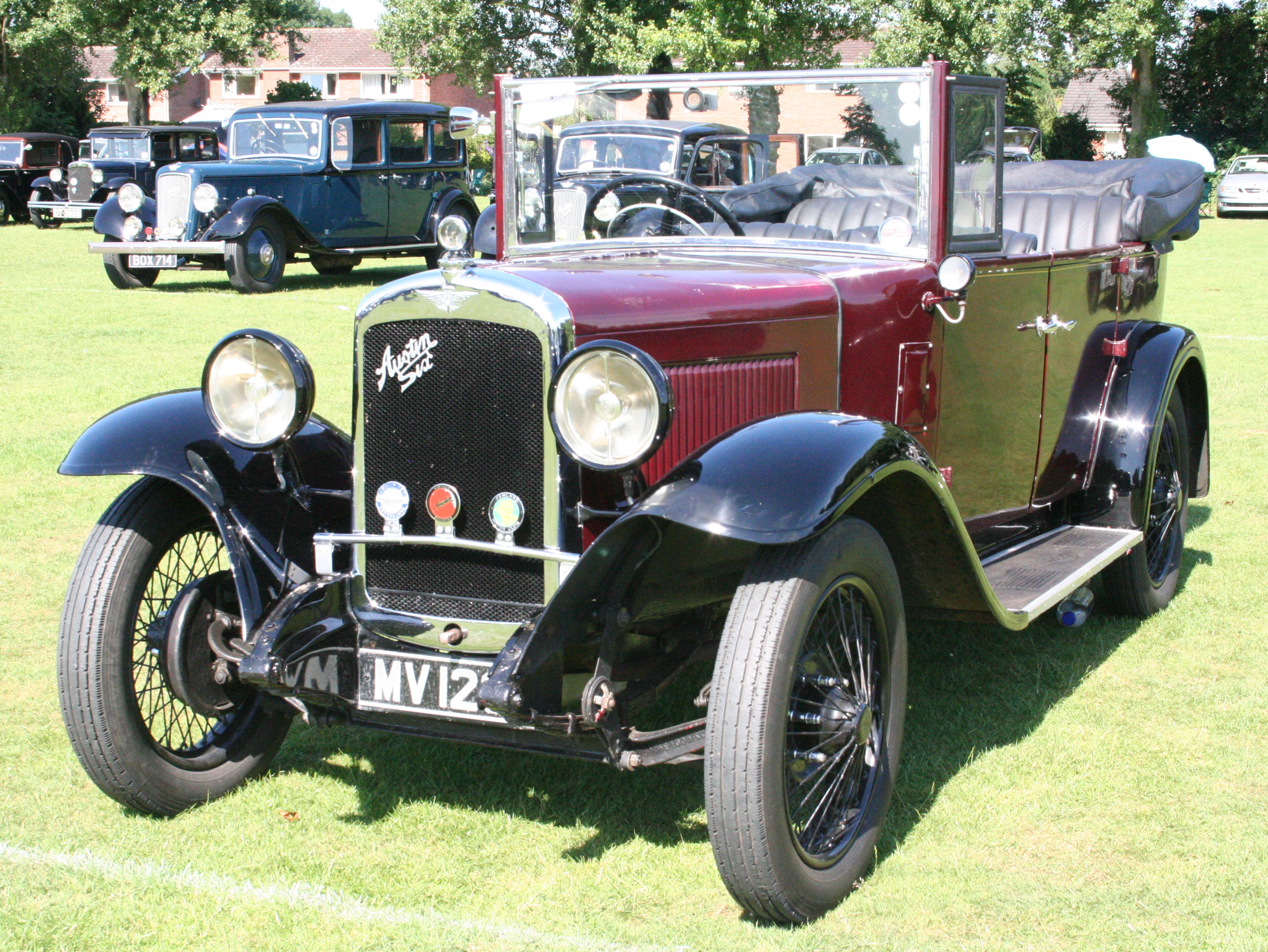
Open Road Sixteen
tourer 1932

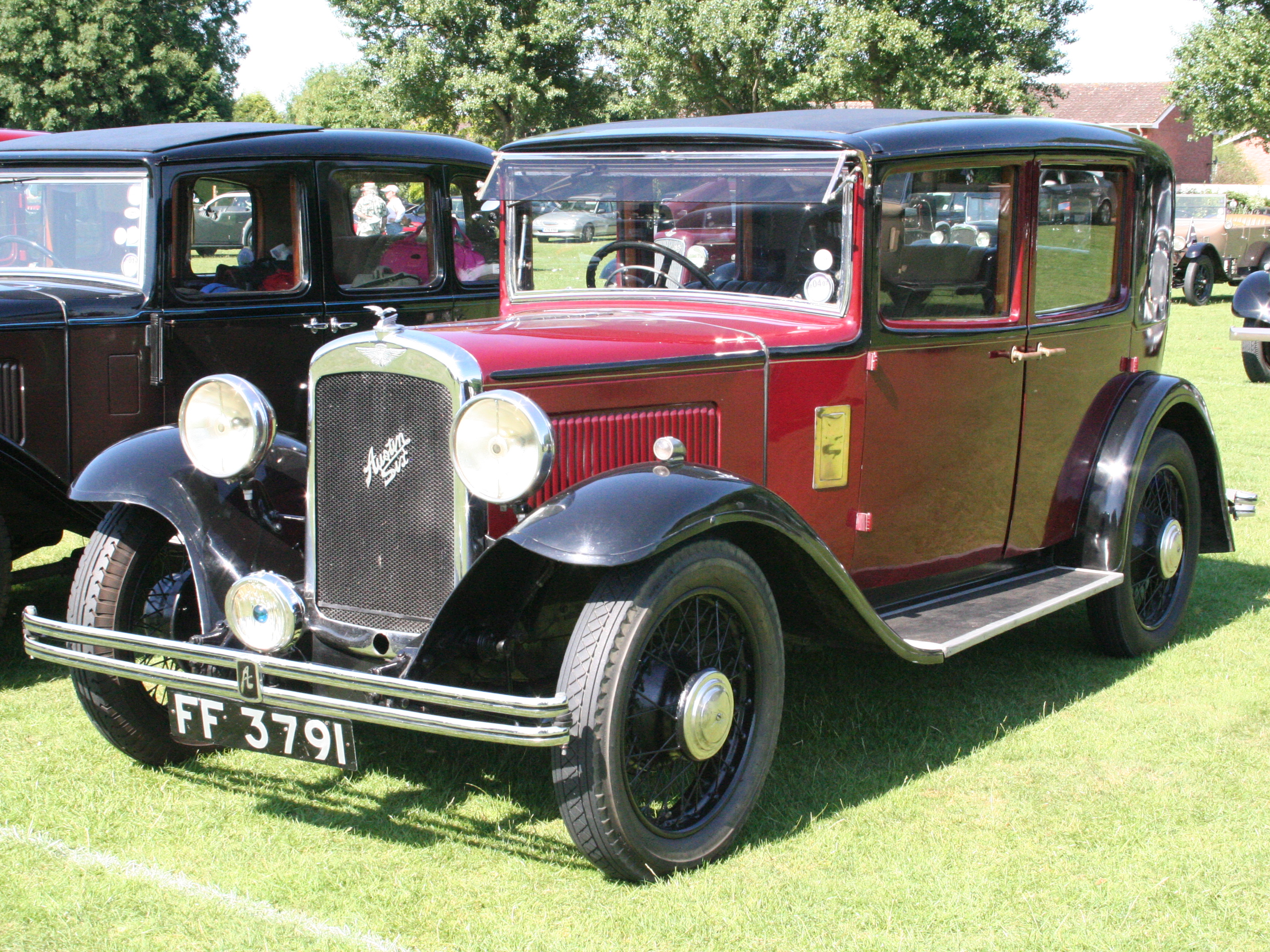
Westminster 4-light
saloon 1932 (Note: Supplied with bumpers, front and rear, at no extra charge)

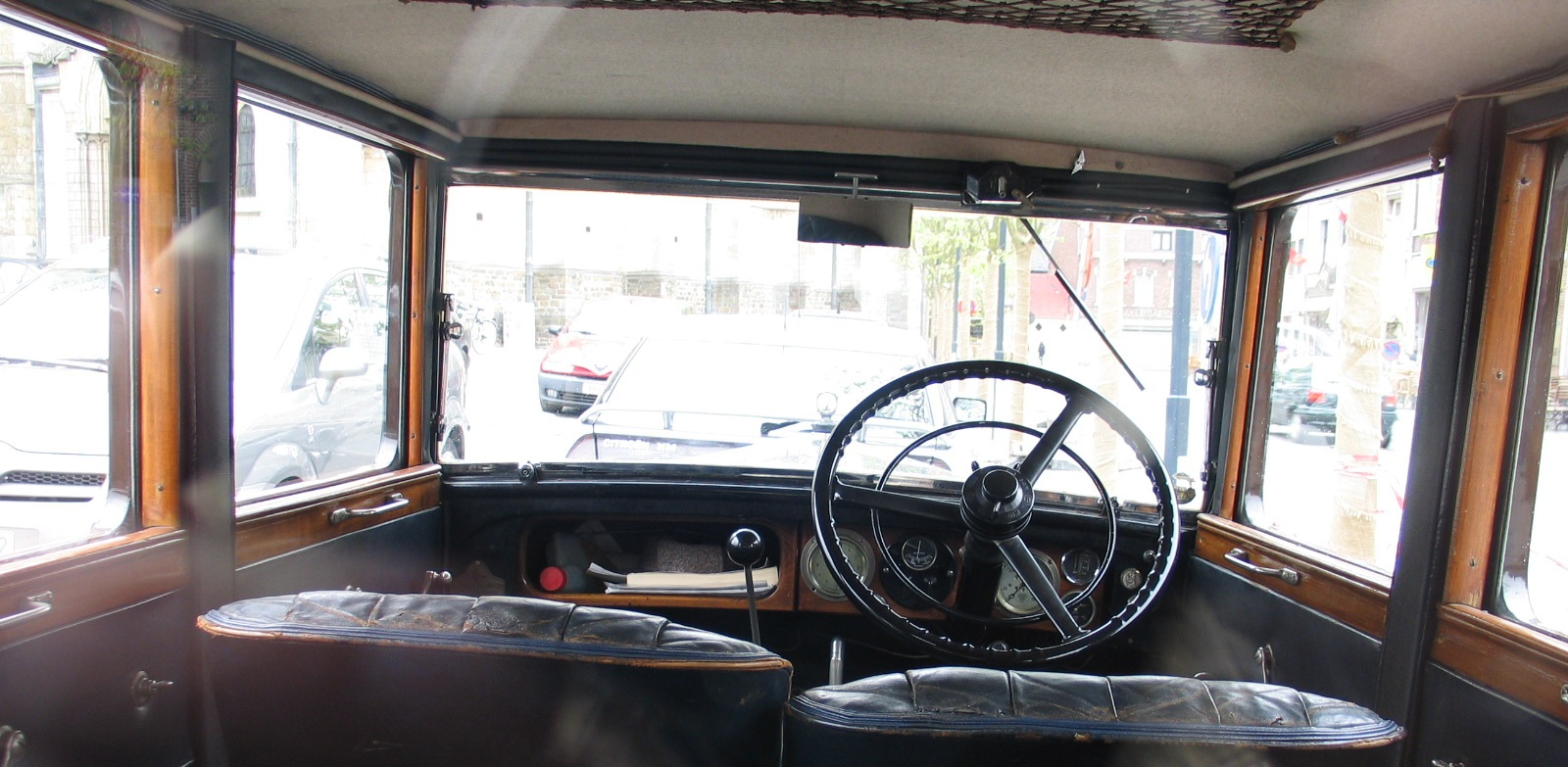
Berkeley Sixteen
saloon interior 1932

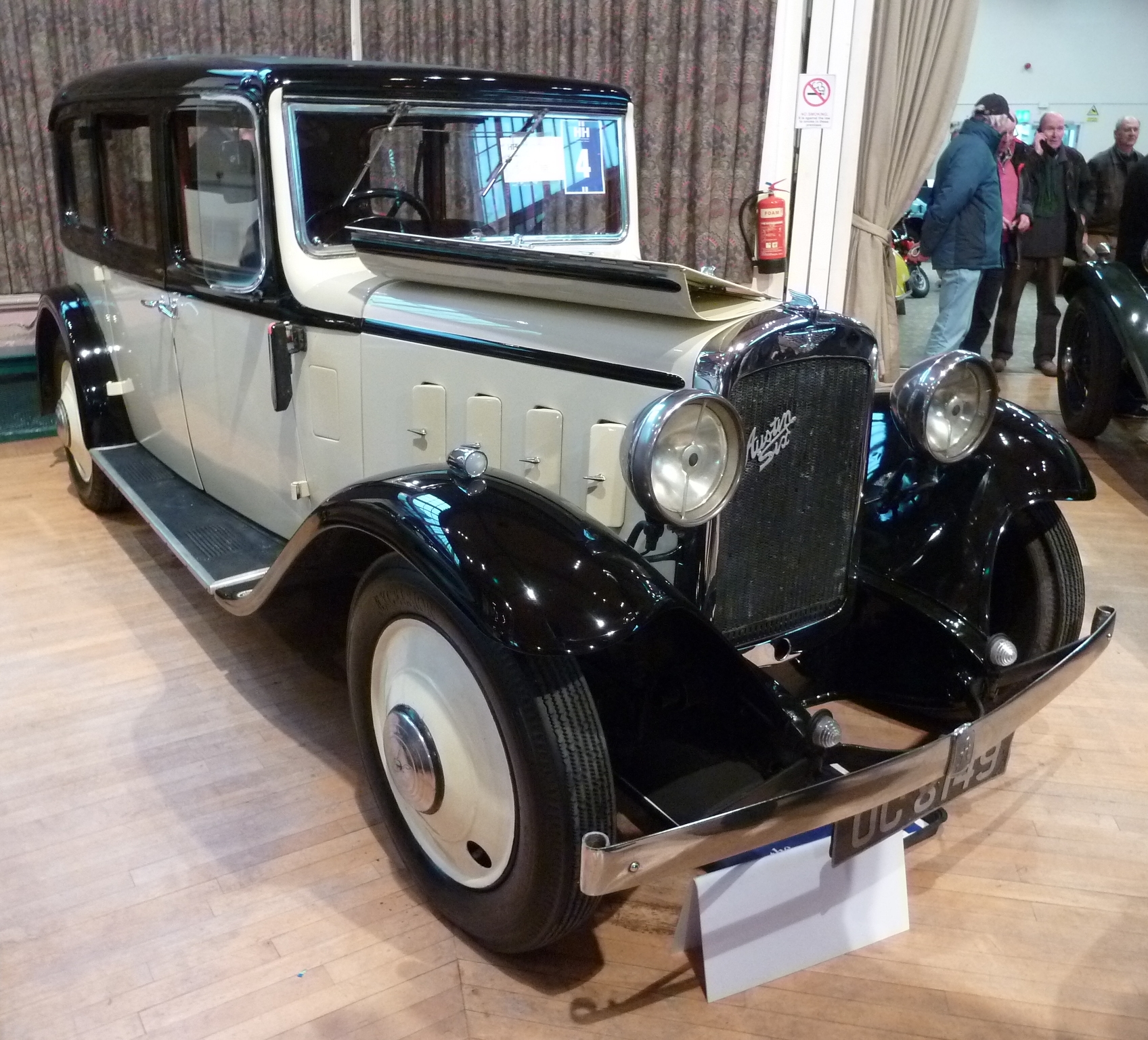
Carlton Sixteen 7-seater
long wheelbase saloon 1934

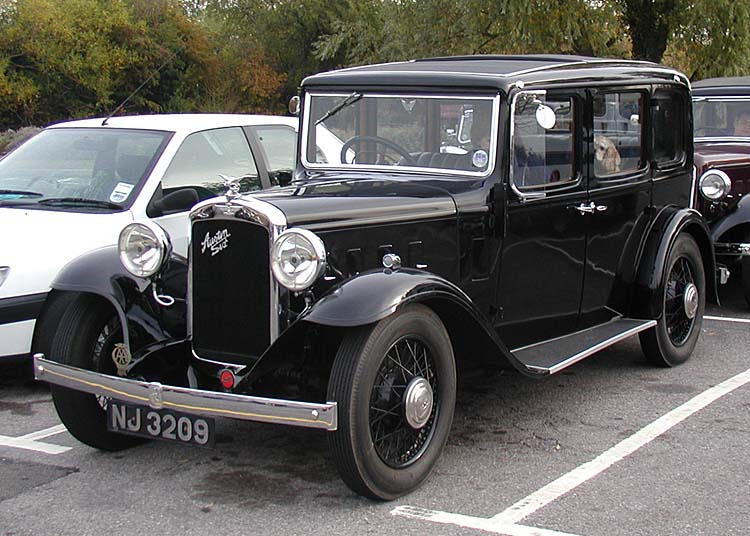
Berkeley Sixteen
saloon 1934

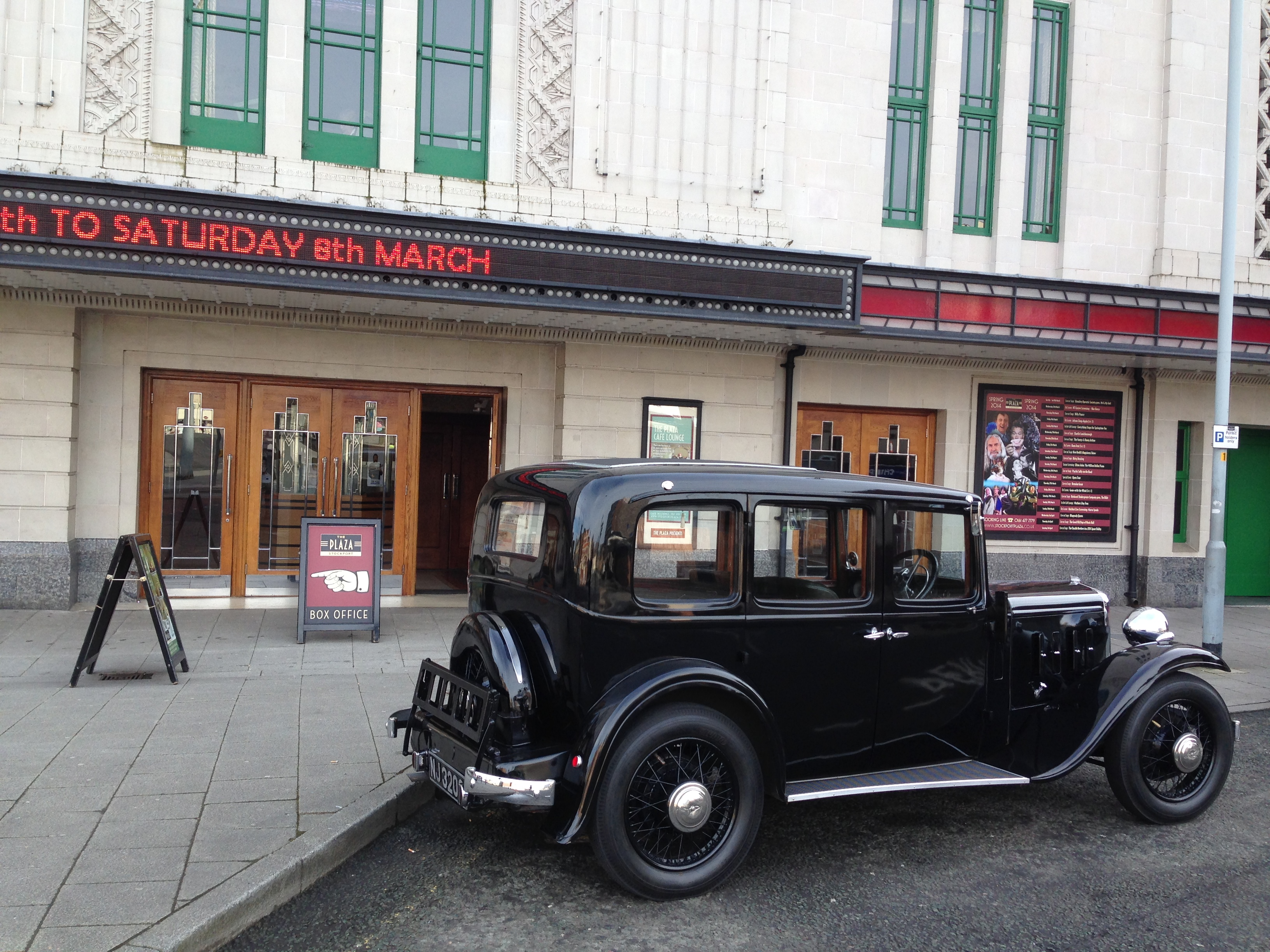
Berkeley Sixteen
saloon 1934
in period setting

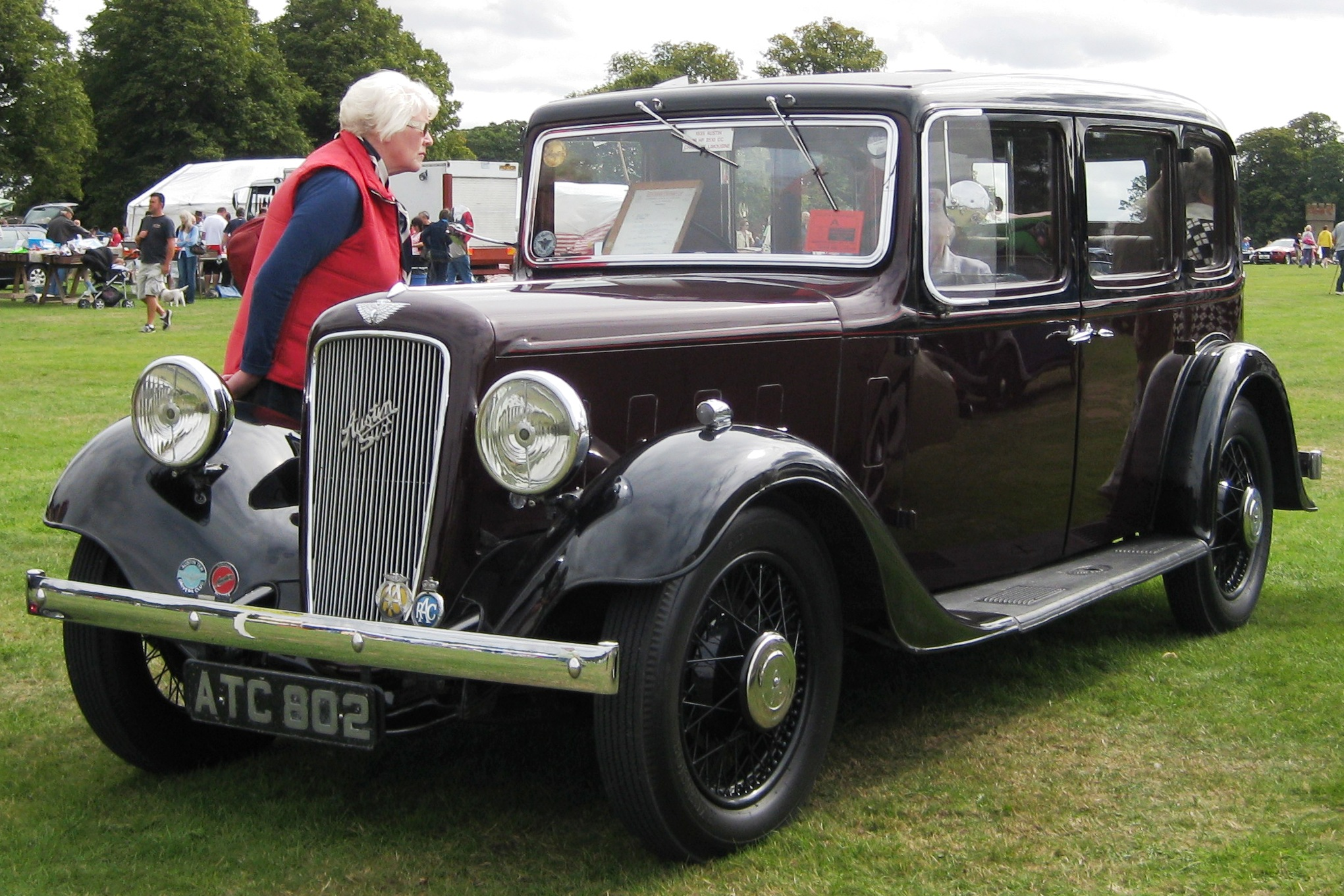
Chalfont Sixteen 18 hp
5-seater saloon 1935
wire wheels (Note: Description from display in windscreen)

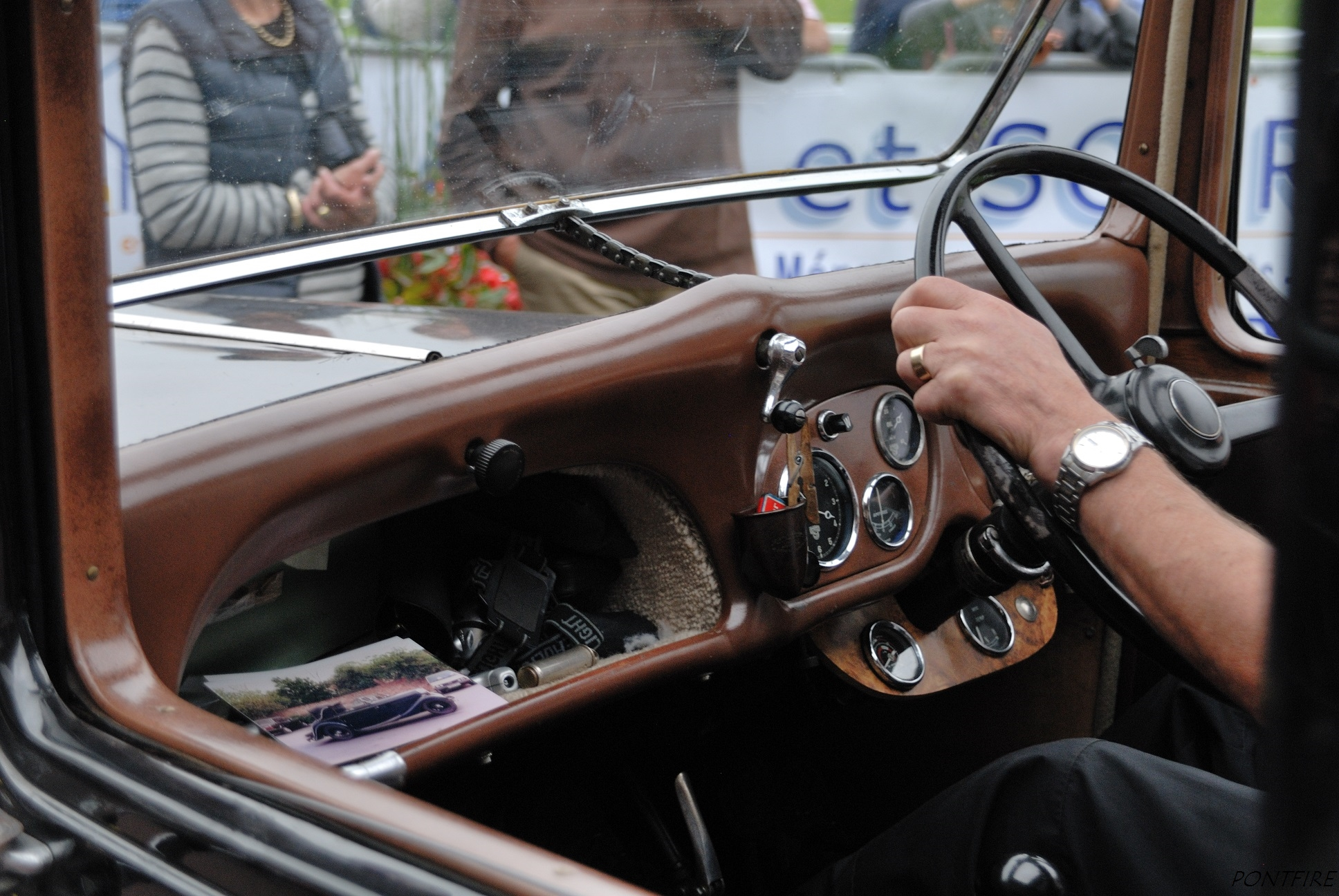
Chalfont Sixteen 18 hp
limousine interior 1936

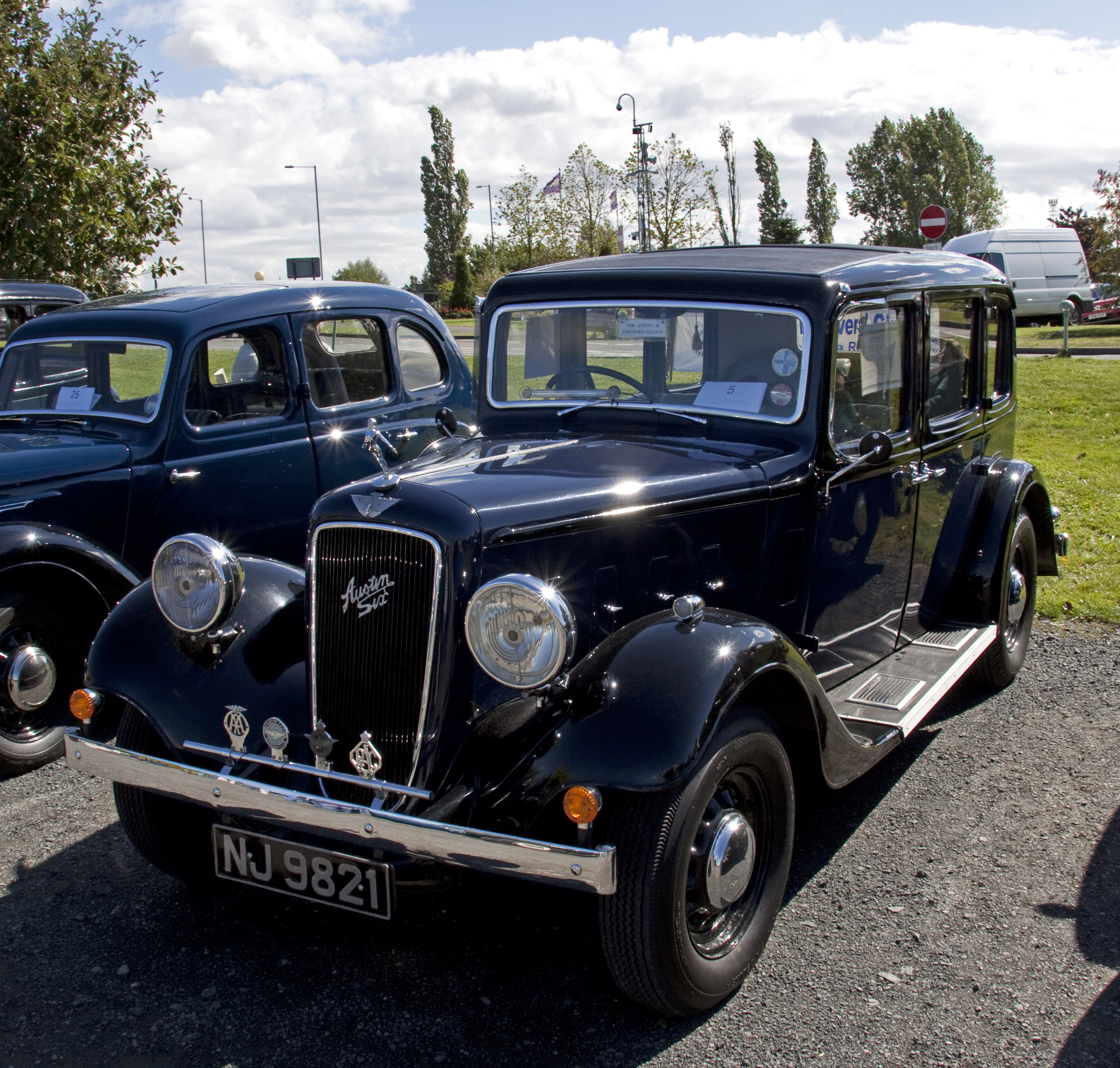
Hertford Sixteen 18 hp
5-seater saloon 1936
pressed steel wheels

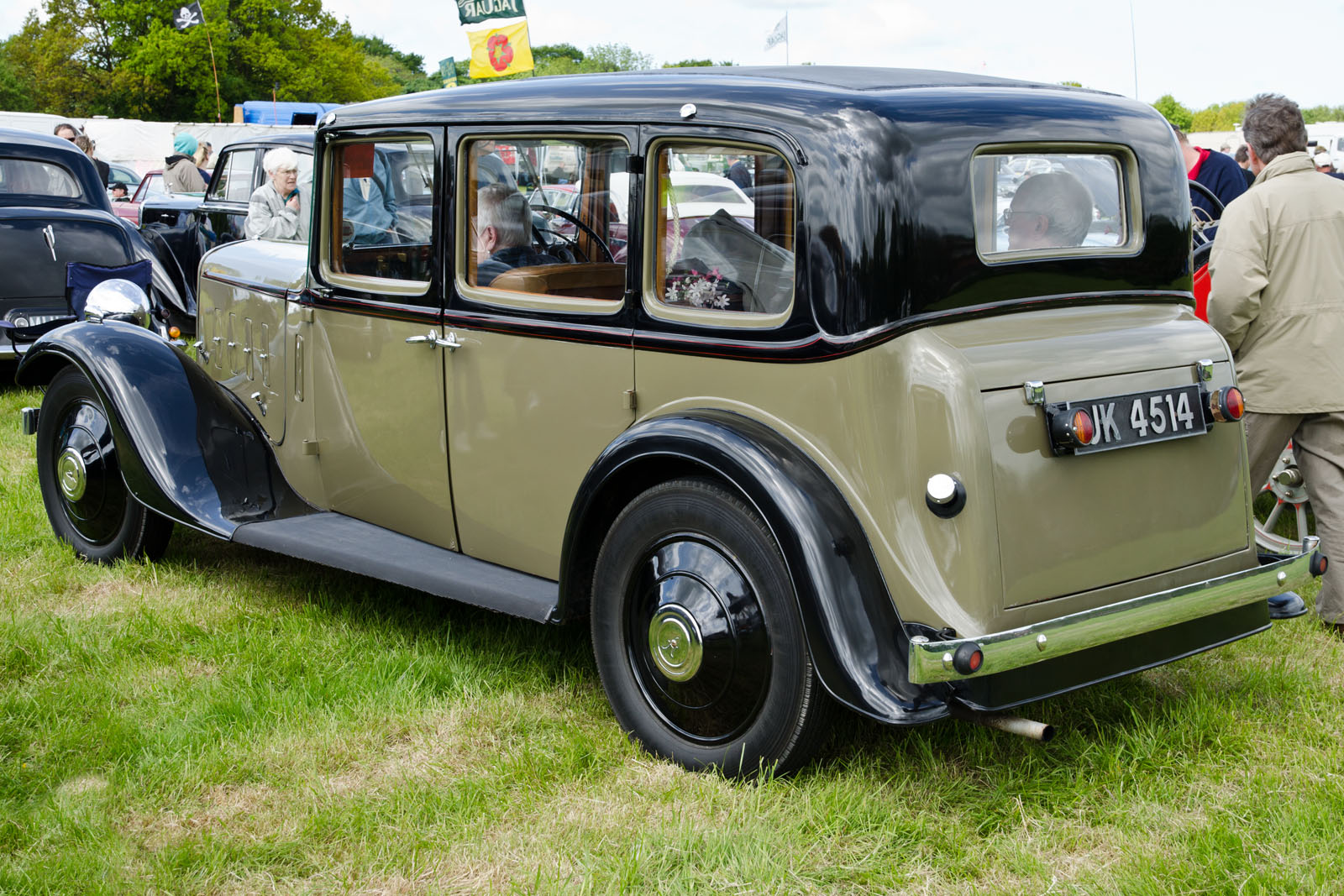
York Sixteen
5-seater saloon 1935
wire wheels

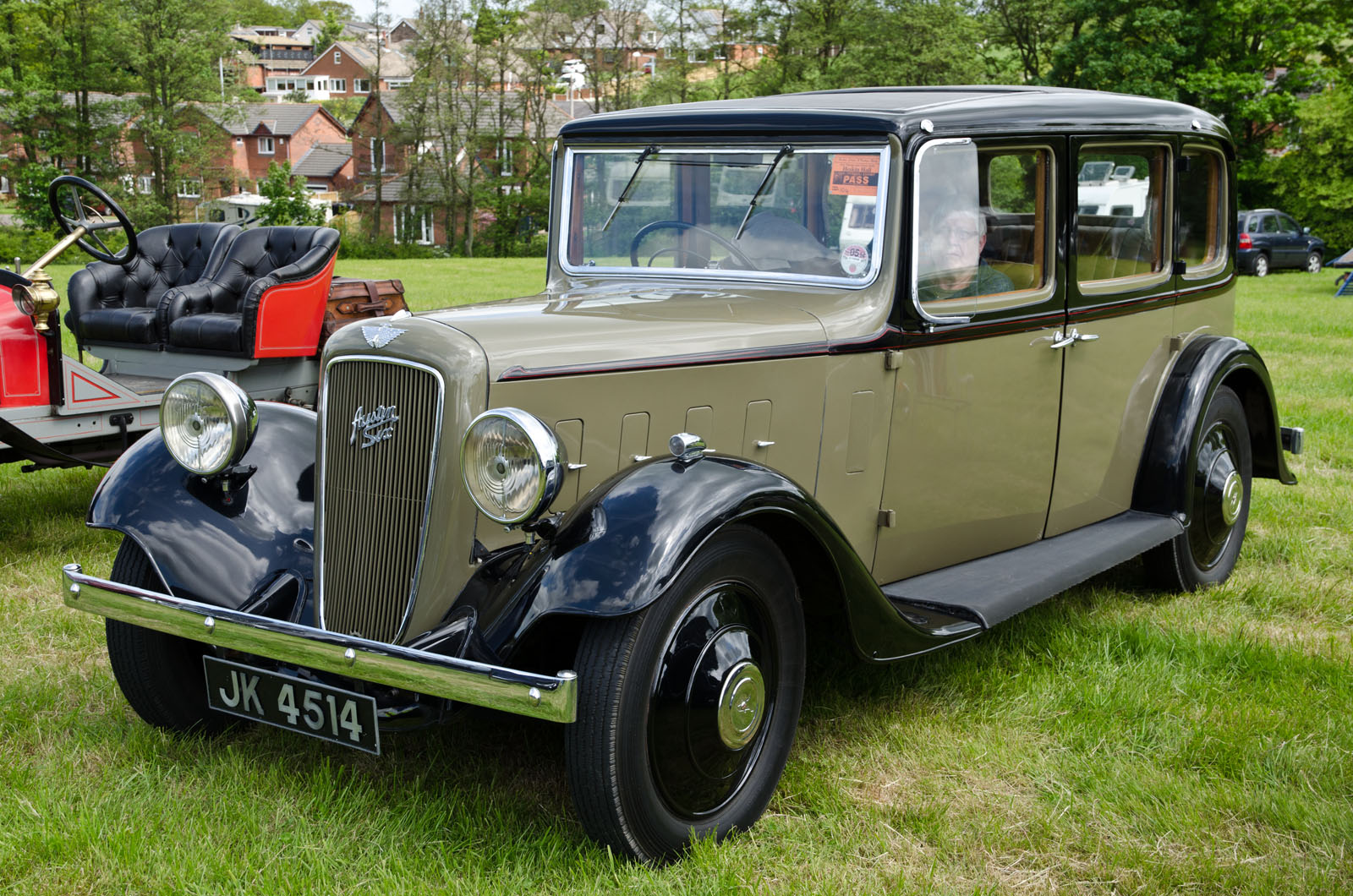
York Sixteen
5-seater saloon 1935
wire wheels

== Catalogue 1927 to 1937 ==
The first name for this car was Austin Sixteen Light Six. In 1930 Light Six was dropped and it was an Austin Sixteen. From 1933 it was deemed necessary to offer an 18 hp engine at no extra charge, in mid 1937 this car's body was replaced by a new shape only available with the 18 hp engine and known as an Austin Eighteen.

Body	Model	seats	side windows (lights)	wheel base	March 1928	March 1929	Oct. 1929	May 1930	Feb. 1932	Aug. 1933	April 1935
					Light Six	Light Six	Light Six	Sixteen	Sixteen	Sixteen; 16 or 18	Sixteen; 16 or 18
Chassis only							£240
Tourer	Open Road	5			£355	£325		£310	£290	£295
Tourer	Open Road	2				£325		£310	£290
Tourer	Clifton	5				£305	£305
Tourer	Harrow	2								£295
Saloon	Burnham	5			£395	£375	£375	£375	£325
Saloon	Burnham drophead (Note: The advertisement states that this car is a 'saloon')	5							£325
Saloon	Fabric	5	4		£435	£365	£365	£365
Saloon	Fabric	5	6			£375		£375
Saloon	Windsor	5							£298
Saloon	Westminster	5	4						£350	£348	£348
Saloon	Berkeley	5	6							£318
Saloon	Hertford	5									£318
Saloon	Carlton	7	6	long						£328
Saloon	Iver	7	6	long						£338
Saloon	York	7	6	long							£328
Saloon	Chalfont	7	6	long							£338
