= Irish Film Archive =

Irish Film Institute body for film culture preservation

- Interactive map of Irish Film Archive
- 53.34466670556333°N 6.264474148079186°W
- Location: 6 Eustace St, Temple Bar, Dublin, Ireland
- Established: 1943
- Website: https://ifi.ie/

The Irish Film Archive is part of the Irish Film Institute (formed in 1943, incorporated in 1945) the body charged with the promotion and preservation of film culture in Ireland.

The Archive collects, preserves and makes accessible Ireland's moving image heritage. It is the leading resource for students of Irish film and film history. Its collection includes 30,000 cans of film,15,000 tapes, the Tiernan MacBride reference library and over 30,000 stills, posters and documents. The collection reflects Irish film production for over a century, with material from 1897 to the present day held in climate controlled vaults in Dublin's cultural quarter, Temple Bar. The collection incorporates fiction, features, public information films, amateur material, documentaries, newsreels, experimental film and animation.

The Archive was originally formed as a department of the IFI in 1986, becoming formally established in 1992 when the Irish Film Institute building in Temple Bar was opened. By the mid-2000s were almost full and a campaign was launched in November 2011 to fund a new archive facility. The campaign sought to raise €300,000, and featured Irish actor Saoirse Ronan. The Archive partnered with Maynooth University to develop a second archive, building on the Maynooth campus and in 2018, the new facility was officially opened, tripling the archive’s capacity.

As part of the Irish Film Institute the Archive receives 25 percent of its funding from the Arts Council of Ireland. The Archive has paid agreements with Screen Ireland and Coimisiún na Meán thus ensuring a comprehensive collection of state funded audiovisual production is centralised and preserved. The Archive has also received project specific funding from both organisations, as well as the Heritage Council, the EU Commission and the Irish Research Council amongst others.

Regular screenings of material from the collections are held at the Irish Film Institute and at other venues in Ireland and abroad. The Archive collections are exhibited nationally and internationally through the IFI’s Irish Film Programming Department. Collections from the Archive are also made available to the public via the IFI Archive Player, which is an online viewing room that is free to use and available worldwide www.ifiplayer.ie. It is a resource for those interested in Ireland's film heritage and is used regularly by academics, students, teachers, film-makers, researchers, film enthusiasts and the general public.

The Archive is the only Irish member of The International Federation of Film Archives (FIAF) contributing to the FIAF book Tales from The Vaults in 2023. IFI Archive staff have been included as faculty in FIAF training initiatives and have presented at a number of FIAF Congresses. In 2019 the IFI Irish Film Archive was awarded full accreditation by the Museum Standards Programme of Ireland (MSPI), an initiative run by the Irish Heritage Council. The Head of the IFI Irish Archive is Kasandra O’Connell who has been in the position since 2000.

== Collection ==
The IFI Irish Film Archive holds one of the largest collections of film and film-related materials in Ireland. Over 700 individuals or organisations have entrusted their films to its care. The collection numbers over 30,000 cans of film, 15,000 broadcast tapes, and an extensive collection of digital material. In addition to moving image collections, the Archive holds a large number of items in its Special Collections, i.e. artefacts posters, stills, and documents. The archive has a non-purchase acquisitions policy, and material is accepted from private sources, production companies and professional bodies. In addition to commercial output, the Archive acquires amateur material, once it falls within its acquisition policy. The archive has formal preservation agreements with Screen Ireland, The Arts Council and Coimisuin na Mean thus ensuring a comprehensive collection of state funded production is centralised and preserved.

=== Preservation and restoration activities ===
The Archive has an active programme of restoration and has worked on a variety of key Irish titles including Guests of the Nation (1935), Beloved Enemy (1936), She Didn’t Say No (1958), This Other Eden (1959) and the Isaac Eppel–produced Irish Destiny (1926) which was screened with a new score by Mícheál Ó Súilleabháin performed by the RTÉ Concert Orchestra at the National Concert Hall in Dublin. In addition to this restoration work the Archive has partnered with filmmakers and cultural partners on large scale preservation projects such as the Irish Adverts Project, The Loopline Collections and The Irish Independence Collection. The IFI has made archival material available on DVD, including The O’Kalem Collection, Seoda (a collection of short films dating from 1948 to 1970), several GAA compilations and a collection of Thaddeus O’Sullivan’s early work.

From 2016 with the launch of the IFI Archive Player access to the collections has largely been online. The IFI Archive player provides free, global access to a wide range of archival material and is available both as an online web player and as a variety of apps.

The Archive has collaborated with a number of academic partners in recent years in order to undertake research and access projects. These include Maynooth University and University of East Anglia on the Women in Focus project, University College Cork and Kingston School of Art on the Make Film History Project, Galway University on the Kalem Collection digitisation and repatriation project and Maynooth University and University of East Anglia on the Women In Focus project.

=== Digital Technology ===
In the last 10 years the Archive has embraced the use of digital technology for access and preservation. In 2014 with financial support from the Irish government digital infrastructure including a fibre optic network and high volume digital storage was installed. This was followed in 2015 by the launch of a Digital Preservation and Access Strategy which emphasised the use of digital technology not only to preserve content but also to make that content available to the public. In 2016/7 the Archive acquired a 2K digital scanner followed by a 4K scanner thus allowing the archive to create preservation-quality digital files. At this time the Archive also developed IFIScripts, a set of open source scripts created inhouse in order to automate preservation activities and improve efficiency for small archives that cannot afford large Digital Asset Management systems. These open source tools are available to the public via the IFI’s Githib page and have won several international awards.
