= Inveresk Lodge Garden =

Coordinates: 55.93425°N 3.04478°W

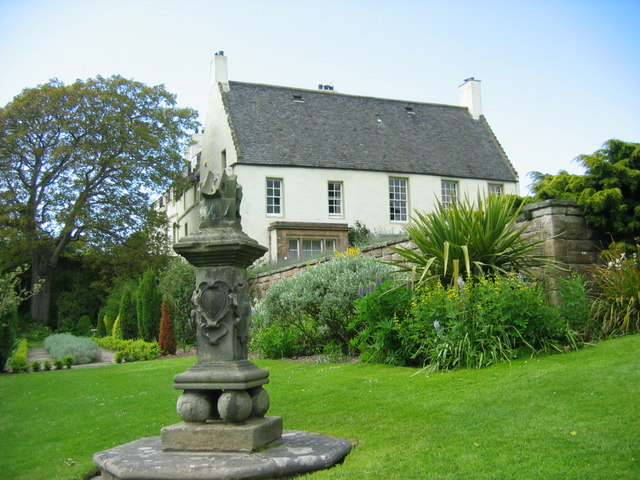
Inveresk Lodge and Garden

Inveresk Lodge Garden is in the care of the National Trust for Scotland, in the village of Inveresk, East Lothian. The lodge lies about 10 km south-east of Edinburgh, and for over a century was one of the homes of the Wedderburn family.

== Wedderburn History ==
Inveresk Lodge was built in 1683, and between 1774 and 1911 it was the home of the Wedderburn family.

James Wedderburn travelled to Jamaica in 1747, and purchased land and slaves, becoming wealthy in the sugar trade. Wedderburn returned to Scotland in 1773; he married Isabella Blackburn in 1774 and bought Inveresk Lodge, where he lived in comfort until his death in 1807. James Wedderburn's brother John Wedderburn of Ballindean was the largest landowner in Jamaica, he is known for the Joseph Knight Legal case which confirmed in principle that Scots Law would not uphold the institution of slavery.

James Wedderburn had children by a number of slave women, one of whom was the radical abolitionist, Robert Wedderburn, who visited his father's family at Inveresk. He recalled that his father did not deny him to be his son "but called me a lazy fellow, and said he would do nothing for me. From his cook I had one draught of small beer, and his footman gave me a cracked sixpence".

James Wedderburn's other son Andrew Colville, born at Inveresk in 1779, became the governor of the Hudson's Bay Company in Canada.

== Later History ==
The portrait painter Archibald Skirving died at the Lodge in 1819.

John Brunton, a Quaker, bought Inveresk Lodge in 1911. His Brunton Wireworks provided the cable for the Forth Road Bridge. During World War II, Inveresk Lodge's garden was needed to grow vegetables in support of the war effort. After the war, he bought and sold exotic birds such as pheasants.

In 1958, Mrs Helen Brunton left the house and gardens to the National Trust for Scotland. The Lodge is let by the Trust for private occupation, but visitors can enjoy the terraced garden.

== Garden ==
The earliest evidence of a garden at Inveresk comes from a 1781 court case to reduce trees overhanging from Inveresk Lodge's Garden to Halkerson's lodge next door.

At the start of the 20th century, four gardeners were employed at Inveresk Lodge. After having been used for vegetable growing for the war effort, the garden became neglected. The National Trust redesigned the garden so that it could be managed by just one gardener.

Inveresk Lodge Garden is a hillside garden, composed of a series of garden rooms, each with its season and theme. Many of the plants have been recognised by the Royal Horticultural Society with an "Award of Garden Merit".

Main features:

- Rose border designed by the horticulturalist and artist Graham Stuart Thomas
- Victorian conservatory, greenhouse and aviary
- herbaceous borders
- Woodland walk
- Meadow pond
- Croquet lawn
- Island beds
- Summer house

== Photo gallery ==
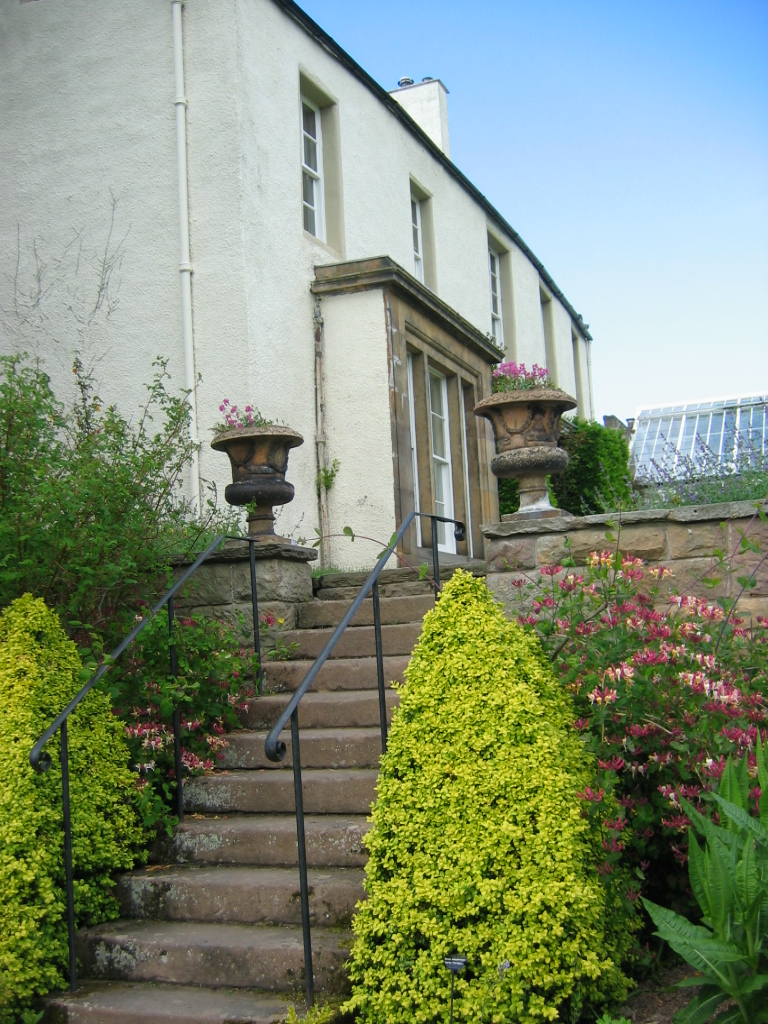
Inveresk Lodge

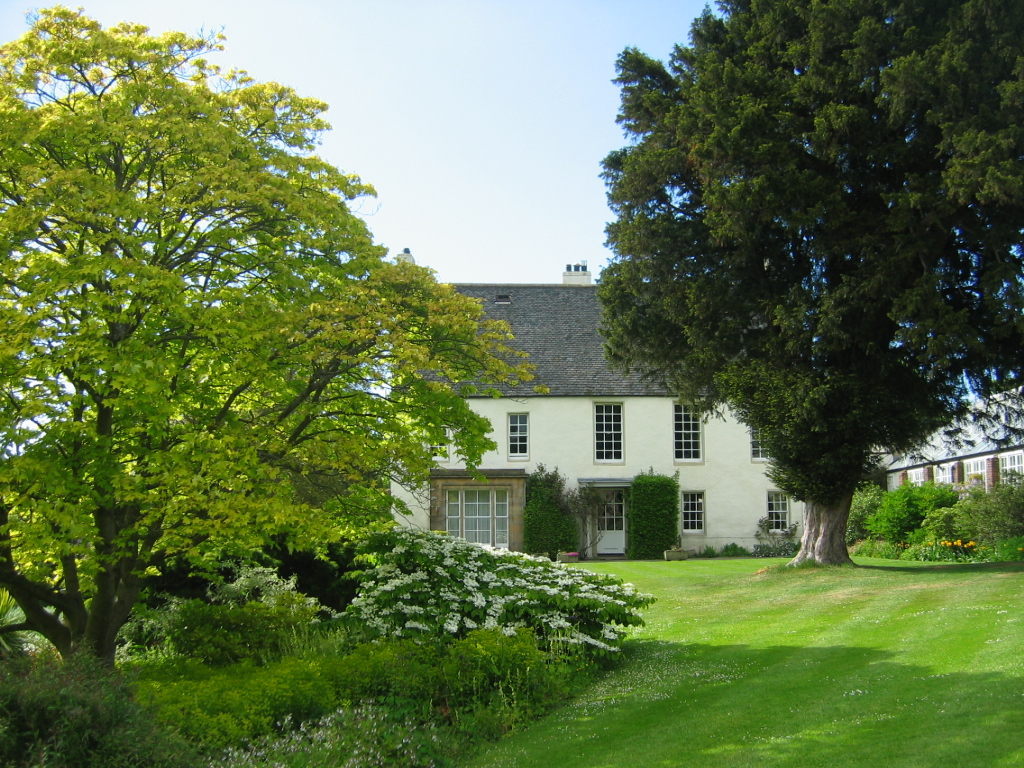
Lodge & Croquet Lawn

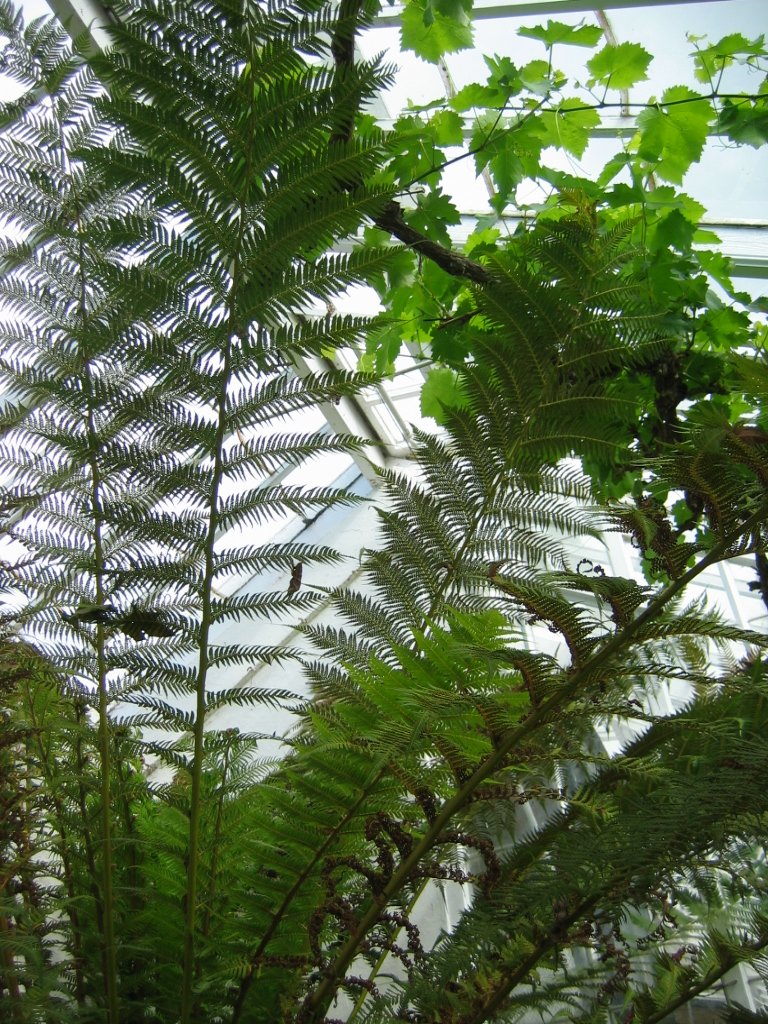
Ferns in the Glasshouse

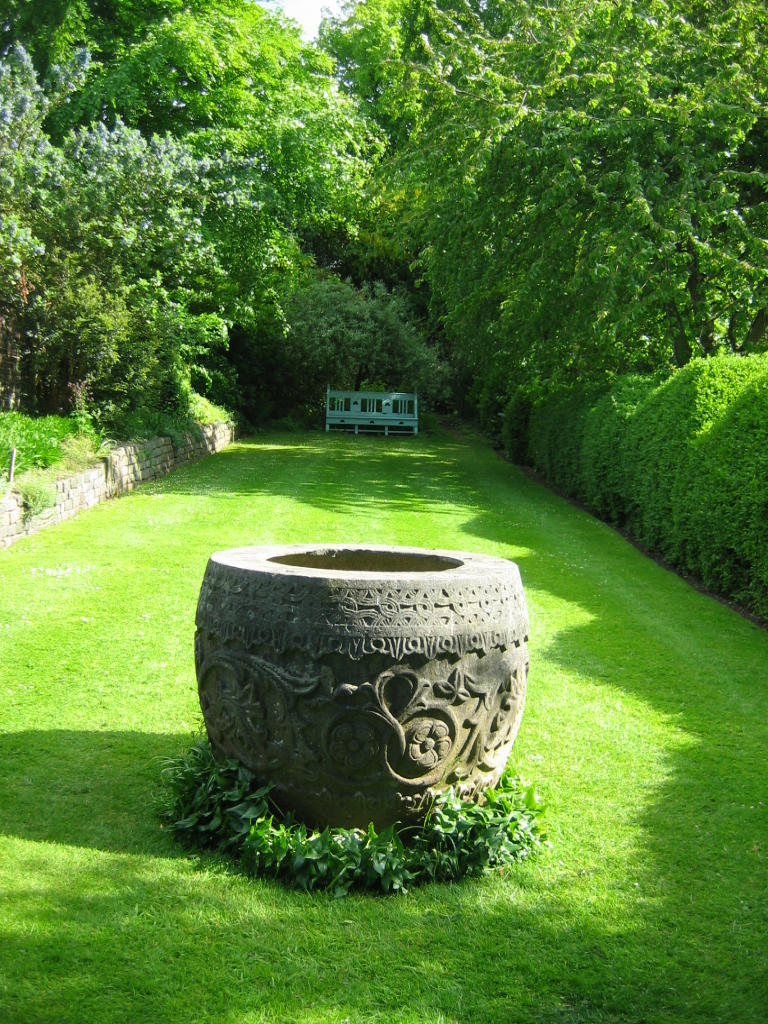
A garden room

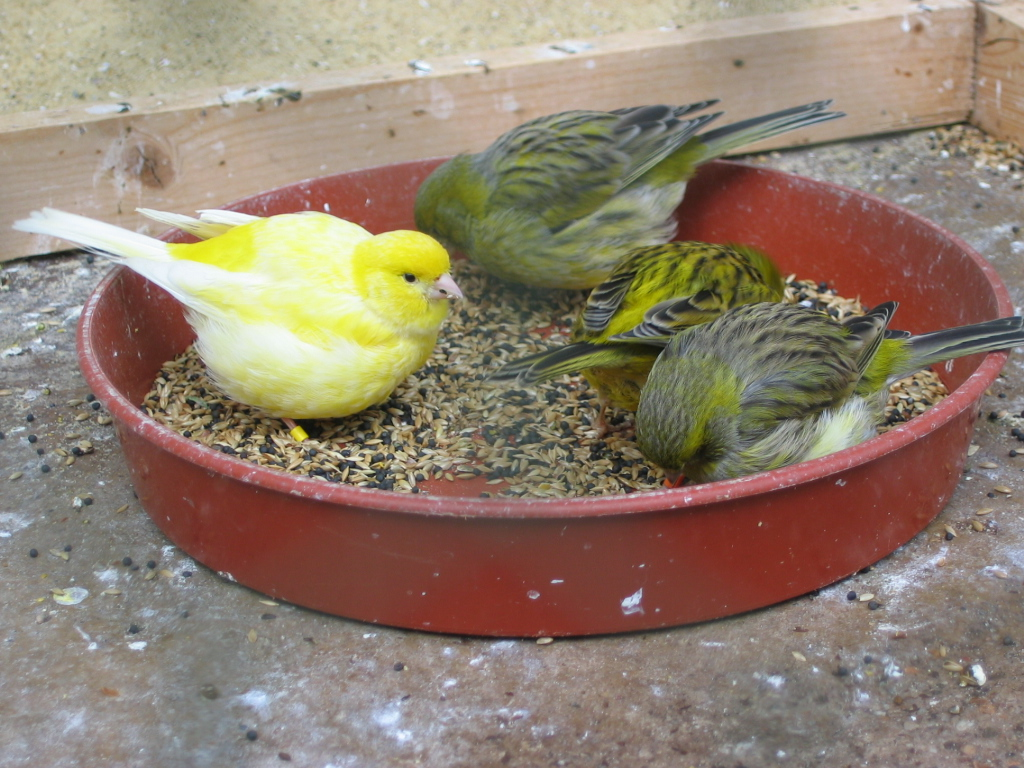
Aviary

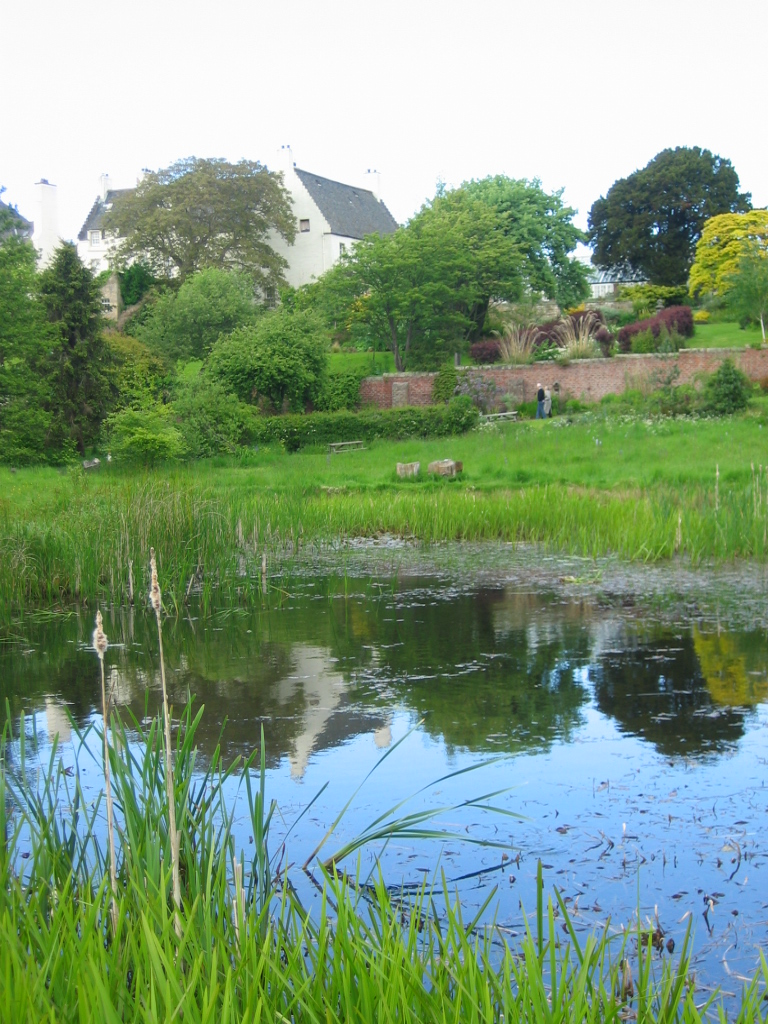
Wildlife pond

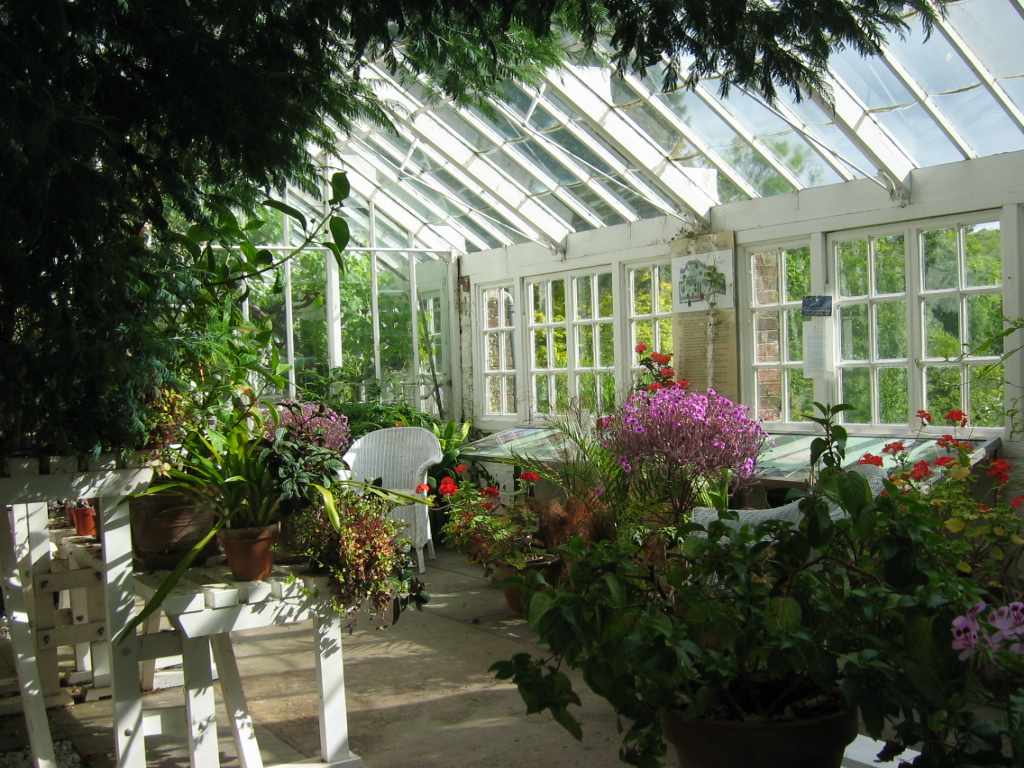
Conservatory

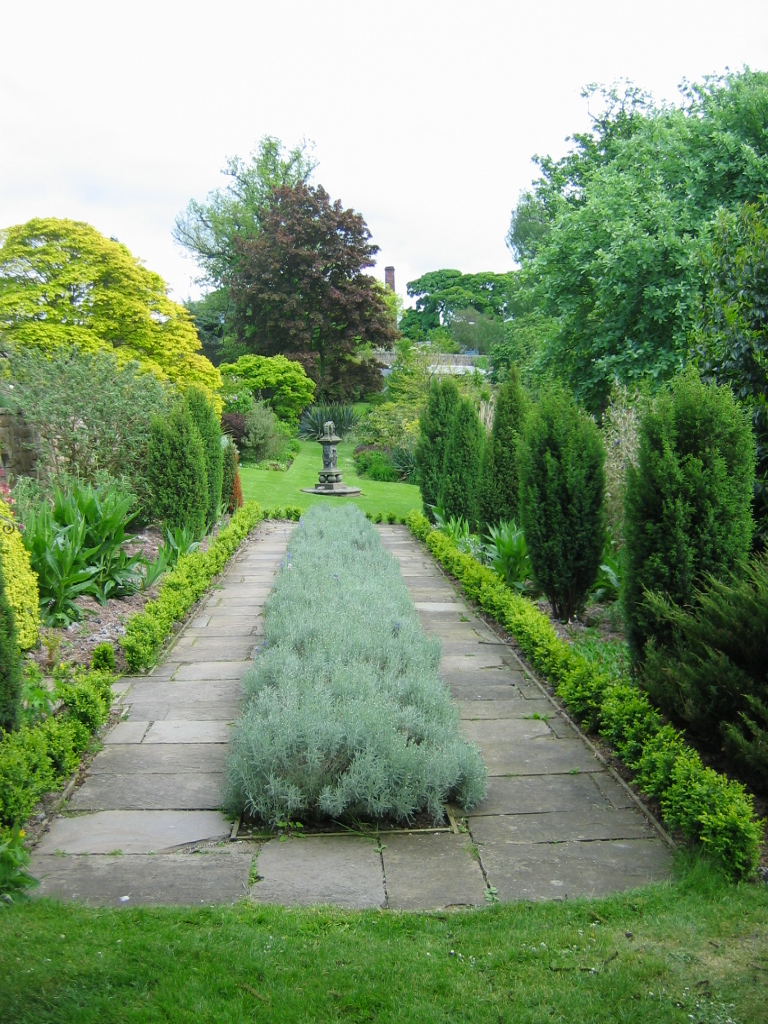
Sundial
