= Wedderburn baronets of Blackness (1704) =

The Wedderburn baronetcy of Blackness in County Forfar was created in the Baronetage of Nova Scotia in 1704, for John Wedderburn. He was an advocate and Clerk of Bills. On 9 August 1704 he was created a baronet, of Balindean in the County of Perth, in the Baronetage of Nova Scotia, with special remainder to his heirs male whatsoever. On the death of the third Baronet in 1723 the title was inherited by Alexander Wedderburn, the nephew of the first Baronet.

Sir John Wedderburn, 5th Baronet of Blackness was a Jacobite supporter of the 1745 rebellion, and the baronetcy was forfeited in 1746, on his execution for high treason.

== Wedderburn baronets, of Blackness (1704) ==
- Sir John Wedderburn, 1st Baronet (1641–1706)
- Sir Alexander Wedderburn, 2nd Baronet (1672–1710)
- Sir John Wedderburn, 3rd Baronet (1700–1723)
- Sir Alexander Wedderburn, 4th Baronet (1675–1744)
- Sir John Wedderburn, 5th Baronet (1704–1746) (forfeit 1746)

After the forfeiture, the title was assumed by the self-proclaimed baronets Sir John Wedderburn, 6th Baronet (1729–1803) and Sir David Wedderburn, 7th Baronet (1775–1858). The latter was created a baronet, of Balindean, in 1803; at which point, according to Cokayne, the original baronetcy could be considered extinct.
