= Sir David Wedderburn, 1st Baronet =

Scottish businessman and Tory politician

Sir David Wedderburn, 1st Baronet MP

Member of Parliament for Perth Burghs
- In office 1805–1818
- Preceded by: David Scott
- Succeeded by: Archibald Campbell

Personal details
- Born: 10 March 1775
- Died: 7 April 1858 (aged 83)
- Party: Tory
- Spouse: Margaret Brown
- Parents: John Wedderburn (father); Margaret Ogilvy (mother)
- Relatives: Sir John Wedderburn (paternal grandfather); Lord Ogilvy (maternal grandfather); Margaret Ogilvy (maternal grandmother); John Wedderburn (half-brother); James Wedderburn-Colville (uncle)

Sir David Wedderburn, 1st Baronet (10 March 1775 – 7 April 1858) was a Scottish businessman and Tory politician. He was Postmaster General for Scotland 1823-31 and a member of two London militias before that.

== Family background ==
Wedderburn was the oldest surviving son of John Wedderburn (1729–1803, styled 6th Baronet) of Ballindean and his first wife Margaret Ogilvy, daughter of David Ogilvy (styled Lord Ogilvy) and Margaret Ogilvy. Both his father's and his mother's family had been attainted after the Jacobite rising of 1745, losing their titles, but his father continued to style himself as a baronet.

His father had escaped to Jamaica after the execution of his own father, Sir John Wedderburn, 5th Baronet of Blackness, and had established a successful business based on slave sugar, trading with his brother and cousins in their London trading house Wedderburn, Webster & Co.

His mother died two weeks after his birth. When he was five years old, his father re-married, giving him as stepmother Alice Dundas, who was related to Henry Dundas, 1st Viscount Melville, the Tory politician. David Wedderburn had two full sisters, Margaret and Jean, and according to the Legacies of British Slave-ownership project, seven half-siblings. The eldest, James, died young. John (1789–1862) succeeded David as the second baronet. (Genealogist Joseph Foster writes that the second baronet's children included David (1835-1882) and William (1838-1918), the third and fourth baronets respectively; the eldest son John had joined the Bengal Civil Service and died in the Indian Mutiny of 1857.) Alexander (1791-1839) was a soldier. The four girls were Maria, Susan, Louisa Dorothea, and Anne. On 9 February 1803, aged 16, Louisa married General John Hope, 4th Earl of Hopetoun. Anne married Sir John Hope, 11th Baronet Hope of Craighall.

== Business and politics ==
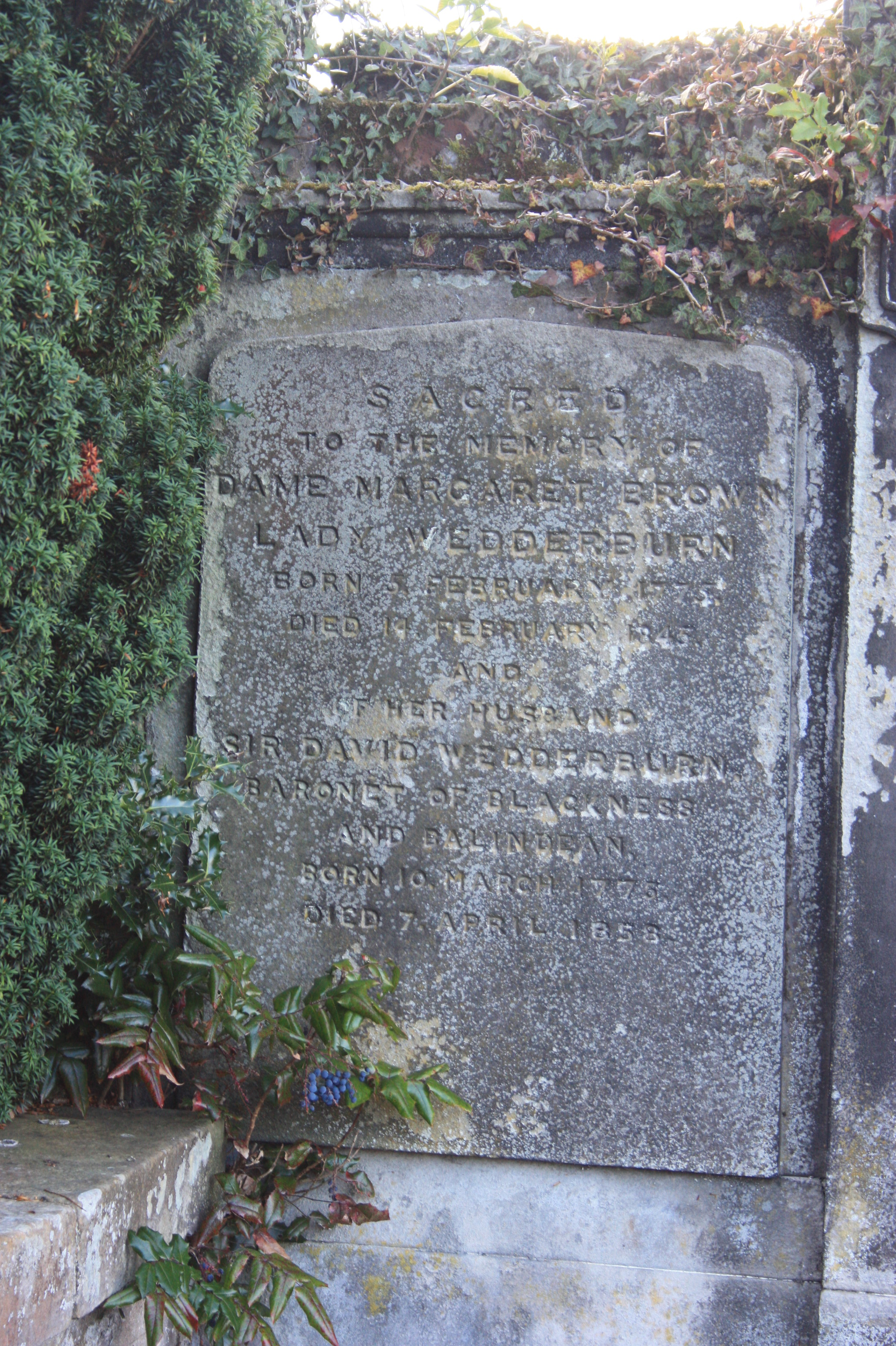
The grave of Sir David Wedderburn, Inveresk churchyard

In 1796 David Wedderburn joined the business, at 35 Leadenhall Street in London, and made large profits. In 1803, he inherited his father's estates in Jamaica and at Ballindean, and was made a baronet, of Ballindean in Perthshire.

He was elected at a by-election in 1805 as the Member of Parliament (MP) for the Perth Burghs. He had the support of the 9th Earl of Kellie, but was opposed by Sir David Scott, 2nd Baronet, son of the deceased MP David Scott (of Dunninald). Scott had the support of the powerful Lord Melville, but by the time he began his canvassing, Wedderburn was too far ahead to be dislodged. He was re-elected unopposed at the next three general elections.

In the House of Commons he voted as a loyal Tory, though after 1812 he did not attend Parliament frequently. He is believed to have never spoken in the Commons.

Wedderburn left Wedderburn, Webster & Co in 1816 and retired from Parliament at the 1818 general election. He sold the Ballindean estate in 1820 to William Trotter for 67 000. He served as Postmaster General for Scotland from 1823 to 1831.

He is buried in Inveresk churchyard. The grave lies midway along the western boundary of the original churchyard, backing onto the Victorian cemetery.

== Marriage and legacy ==
He married Margaret Brown (1775-1845). They had two sons, but both died before Sir David, so the title went to his half-brother, Sir John Wedderburn, son of Alice Dundas.

== See also ==
- Clan Wedderburn

Parliament of the United Kingdom
Preceded by David Scott	Member of Parliament for Perth Burghs; 1805–1818	Succeeded by Archibald Campbell
Baronetage of the United Kingdom
New creation	Baronet (of Balindean, Perthshire); 1803–1858	Succeeded by John Wedderburn
