= Ogilvy-Wedderburn baronets =

Baronetcy in the Baronetage of the United Kingdom

Escutcheon of the Wedderburn baronets

The Wedderburn, later Ogilvy-Wedderburn Baronetcy, of Balindean in the County of Perth, is a title in the Baronetage of the United Kingdom created in 1803.

The third Baronet sat as Member of Parliament for Ayrshire South and Haddington Burghs while the fourth Baronet represented Banffshire in Parliament as a Liberal. On the latter's death in 1918 the title was inherited (according to the special remainder) by his kinsman John Andrew Ogilvy-Wedderburn, the fifth Baronet, who had assumed the surname of Ogilvy-Wedderburn the same year. He was a descendant of James Wedderburn-Colville, youngest son of the fifth Baronet of the 1704 creation. His grandfather Peter Wedderburn had in 1811 married Anna, daughter and heiress of James Ogilvy, and assumed the surname of Wedderburn-Ogilvy on the death of his father-in-law in 1826.

== Revival of Wedderburn title ==
The baronetcy is a revival of an earlier title held by the family, which had been forfeited in 1746 following the 1745 Rebellion. On 18 August 1803 David Wedderburn, "7th Baronet of Balindean" (but for the attainder), was created a baronet, of Balindean in the County of Perth, in the Baronetage of the United Kingdom, with remainder, failing heirs male of his own, to the heirs male of the fourth Baronet of the 1704 creation. Sir David later represented Perth Burghs in the House of Commons and served as Postmaster-General for Scotland.

== Wedderburn, later Ogilvy-Wedderburn baronets, of Balindean (1803) ==
- Sir David Wedderburn, 1st Baronet (1775–1858)
- Sir John Wedderburn, 2nd Baronet (1789–1862)
- Sir David Wedderburn, 3rd Baronet (1835–1882)
- Sir William Wedderburn, 4th Baronet (1838–1918)
- Sir John Andrew Ogilvy-Wedderburn, 5th Baronet (1866–1956)
- Sir (John) Peter Ogilvy-Wedderburn, 6th Baronet (1917–1977)
- Sir Andrew John Alexander Ogilvy-Wedderburn, 7th Baronet (1952–2025)
- Sir Peter Robert Alexander Ogilvy-Wedderburn, 8th Baronet (born 1987)

The heir apparent to the baronetcy is Gus Ogilvy-Wedderburn, son of the 8th Baronet.

== Balindean ==
The place-name associated with the baronetcy is Balindean; the place itself is now spelled Ballindean. The estate lies near Inchture, a village between Dundee and Perth on the northern side of the Firth of Tay. In 1769 it was purchased by John Wedderburn, who had rebuilt the family fortune by slave sugar plantations in Jamaica.

In 1820 his son, the 1st baronet sold the Balindean estate to William Trotter, later Lord Provost of Edinburgh, for £67,000. The Wedderburn baronets had no further connection with Balindean, other than in the place-name associated with the title.

The Ballindean House (NB spelling), the listed building visible today, is an 1832 rebuild.

== See also ==
- Clan Wedderburn
- Halkett baronets

== Notes ==
Baronetage of the United Kingdom
Preceded by Barlow baronets	Ogilvy-Wedderburn baronets of Balindean; 18 August 1803	Succeeded by Watson baronets
