= Andrew Ogilvy-Wedderburn =

British bobsledder (1952–2025)

Personal information
- Full name: Andrew John Alexander Ogilvy-Wedderburn
- Nationality: British
- Born: 4 August 1952; Gosport, England
- Died: 9 April 2025 (aged 72)

Sport
- Sport: Bobsleigh

Sir Andrew Ogilvy-Wedderburn, 7th Baronet (4 August 1952 – 9 April 2025) was a British bobsledder. He competed at the 1976 Winter Olympics and the 1980 Winter Olympics. He was also the 7th Baronet of Ballindean. Ogilvy-Wedderburn died on 9 April 2025, at the age of 72.

Baronetage of the United Kingdom
Preceded by Peter Ogilvy-Wedderburn	Baronet (of Balindean); 1977–2025	Succeeded by Peter Ogilvy-Wedderburn
