= William Trotter (cabinet-maker) =

William Trotter of Ballindean JP DL (1772–1833) was a Scottish cabinet-maker who served as Lord Provost of Edinburgh from 1825 to 1827.

A highly respected maker of Regency furniture he has been called Scotland's greatest cabinet-maker. He has a distinctive and recognisable style.

== Family background ==
The Trotter family were part of the Merchant Company of Edinburgh from 1691.

William was born in Edinburgh on 10 November 1772 one of at least eleven children of Thomas Trotter (1724–1804) and his wife, Charlotte Knox. His grandfather Thomas Trotter (1685–1767) was a major supplier of provisions and is recorded as supplying the Duke of Cumberland's army in the 1745 rebellion. His eldest uncle, also William Trotter, was the Shore Dues Officer in Leith and lived at 79 Princes Street. His uncle Rev John Trotter was minister of Ceres, Fife and later minister of the Scots Church in London. His brother Thomas Trotter joined the army and rose to the rank of Major General in the Royal Artillery.

Some time in the 1740s his father had gone into partnership with Robert Young to create the furniture company of "Young & Trotter". In 1796 a further partner was added and it was renamed "Young, Trotter & Hamilton".

The family home until 1797 was on Gosford Close on Edinburgh's Royal Mile. They then moved to 23 George Street: a new house in Edinburgh's First New Town.

== Career ==
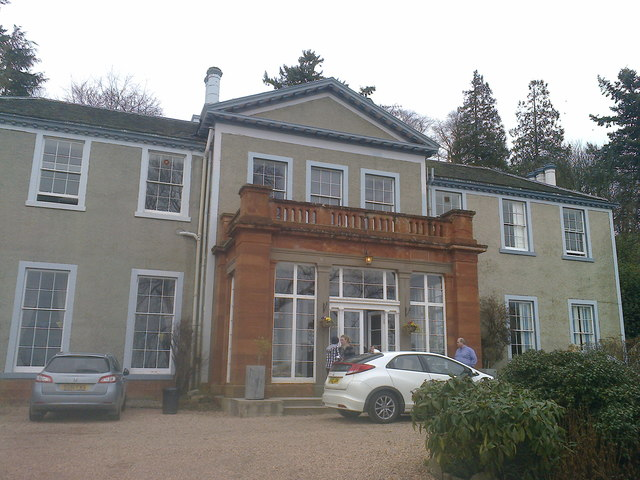
Ballindean House

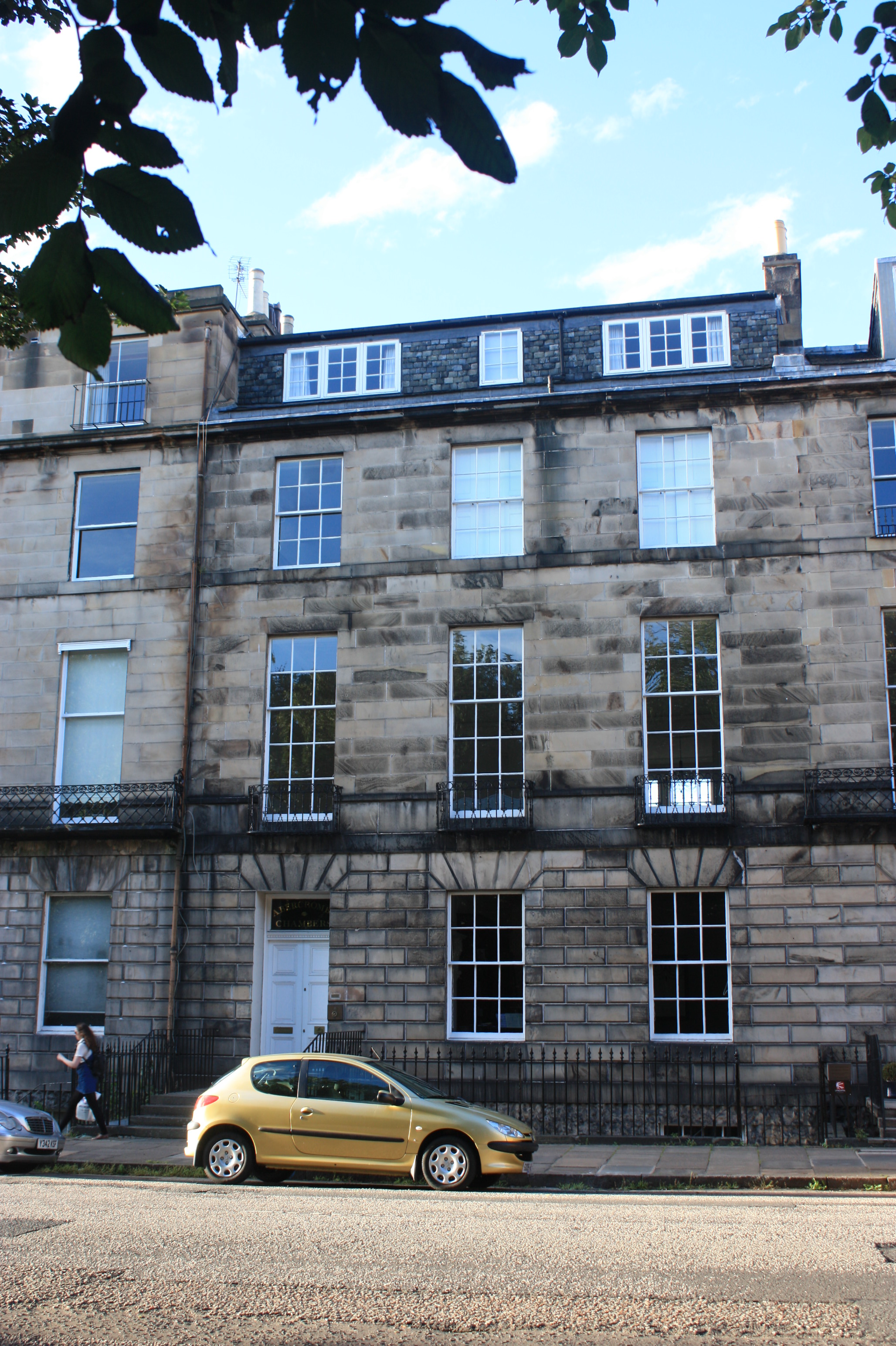
13 Abercromy Place

In 1810 he was living and trading in the small section of houses on the south side of Princes Street at its east end (later rebuilt as the North British Hotel). These had previously been the premises of "Young & Trotter". He is then described as a cabinet-maker, upholsterer and undertaker. From this time until 1817 the family lived at 25 Northumberland Street in Edinburgh.

In 1820 he bought the Ballindean estate in Perthshire from Sir David Wedderburn, 1st Baronet at a cost of £67,000. It lies midway between Perth and Dundee and was previously the home of John Wedderburn. The estate includes the home farm and four tenanted farms in the parishes of Inchture and Longforgan.

In 1825 William succeeded Alexander Henderson of Press as Lord Provost. He was then living at 13 Abercromby Place. His most notable decision as Lord Provost was agreeing the layout of the Grindlay estate in south-west Edinburgh: Castle Terrace, Lothian Road (north), Cambridge Street, Spittal Street and Grindlay Street. The feuing and masterplan was by William Burn.

In July 1825 he was commissioned to provide furniture for the Chinese Room at the newly completed Kinfauns Castle, a neighbour to the Ballindean estate. The furniture was ready for the castle's first occupation by Francis, 14th Lord Gray in 1826.

In 1830 he added the estate of South Ballo to the Ballindean estate and in 1832 he rebuilt Ballindean House (originally built in 1711 and owned by the Trotters since 1741) to his own specification. The architect was Thomas Hamilton thought to be a cousin of Hamilton his business partner. The house includes a very large ballroom. The old house was downgraded to estate offices and demolished in 1962.

His final shop was at 9 Princes Street. It had a substantial warehouse attached to its rear.

== Death and legacy ==
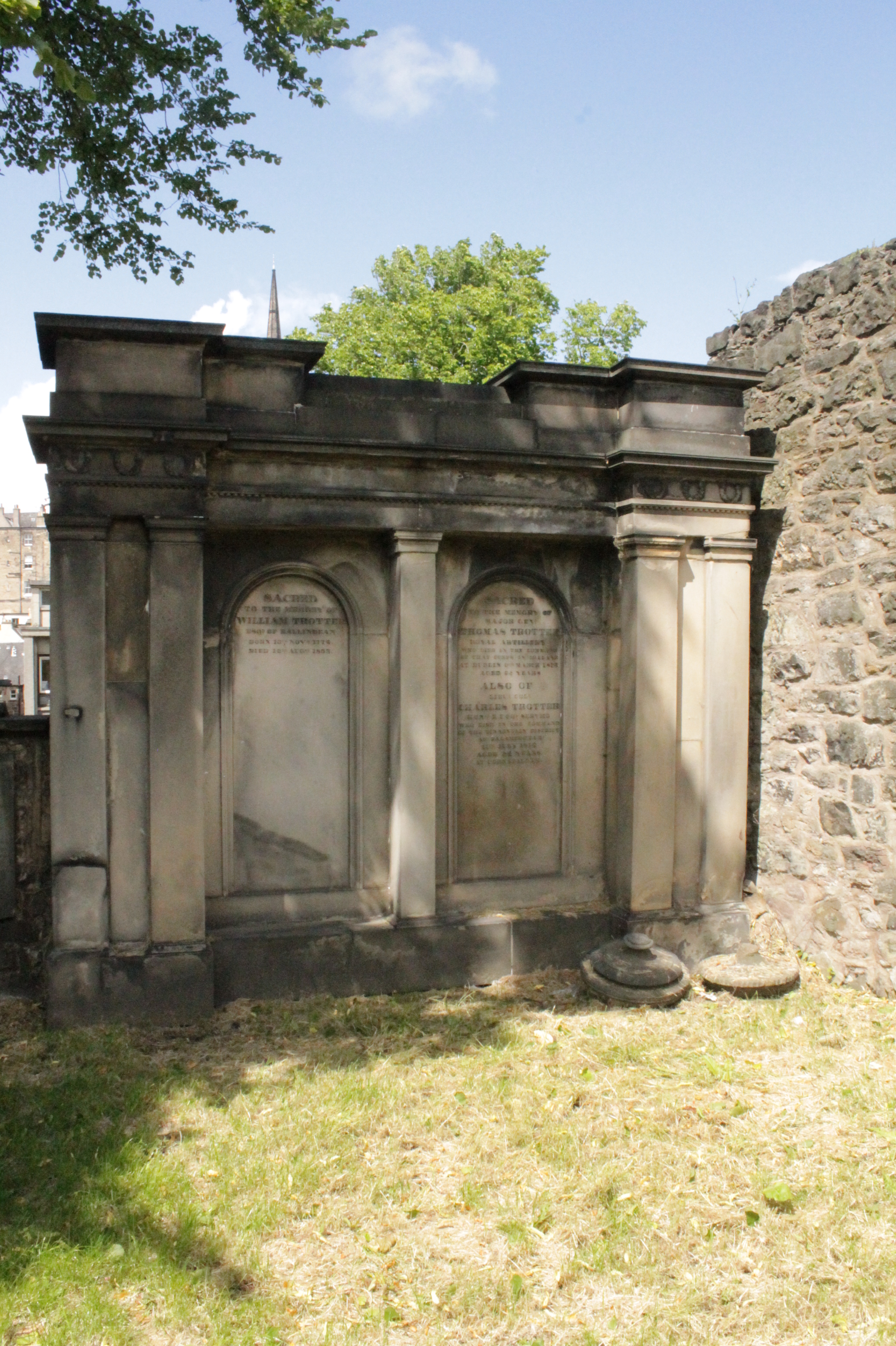
The grave of William Trotter of Ballindean, Greyfriars Kirkyard

He died at home, 13 Abercromby Place in Edinburgh's Second New Town on 16 August 1833. He is buried in Greyfriars Kirkyard. The grave lies in the extreme north-east corner of the western extension.

Both Ballindean and Abercromby Place survive and both are listed buildings. His shop and warehouse on Princes Street were redeveloped to create the North British Hotel, now called the Balmoral Hotel.

== Family ==
In 1801 he married his cousin, St Clair Stuart Knox. They had six sons and three daughters.

The oldest son Robert Knox Trotter of Ballindean (1807–1876) joined the army and married Lord Rollo's daughter, Mary Rollo, who notoriously had an affair with Napoleon III.

His youngest son, Charles Trotter (b.1816) inherited the Princes Street store when he reached the age of 21 in 1837.
