= 1879 Haddington Burghs by-election =

UK Parliamentary by-election

The 1879 Haddington Burghs by-election was fought on 25 February 1879. The by-election was fought due to the succession to a peerage of the incumbent Liberal MP, William Hay, 10th Marquess of Tweeddale. It was won by the Liberal candidate Sir David Wedderburn.

1879 Haddington Burghs by-election
Party	Candidate	Votes	%	±%
Liberal	David Wedderburn	921	56.0	N/A
Conservative	John Macdonald	723	44.0	N/A
Majority		198	12.0	N/A
Turnout		1,644	89.1	N/A
Registered electors		1,846		
Liberal hold		Swing	N/A	
