= Clan Wedderburn =

Lowland Scottish clan

- Crest: An eagle's head erased Proper.
- Motto: Non Degener (Not Degenerate

Profile
- Plant badge: Beech

Chief
- Henry David Scrymgeour-Wedderburn
- Lord Scrymgeour
- Historic seat: Blackness House

Clan Wedderburn is a Lowland Scottish clan.

== History ==
=== Origins of the clan ===
The first person of the name of this clan on record in Scotland is Wautier de Wederburn who rendered homage to Edward I of England in 1296. The lands of Wederburn were in Berwickshire. Other early references to the name are John de Wedderburn living in 1364 and William de Wedderburn who lived between 1426 and 1452. The lands of Wedderburn however passed to the Clan Home at an early date.

After the decline of the Wedderburns in the Scottish Borders, the family seems to have settled in Forfarshire. By 1400 there were four distinct yet closely related Wedderburn families who could be found in Dundee and Kingennie in Forfar.

=== 16th and 17th centuries ===
One of the Dundee families was that of James Wedderburn. His three sons, James, John and Robert, were among the earliest Scottish Protestant reformers. They united to write the famous Guide and Godlie Ballads which were known as the Wedderburn Psalms.

From the eldest brother James is descended James Wedderburn, Bishop of Dunblane in 1636, who, as the friend of Archbishop Laud and those responsible for introducing a new liturgy to the Church, was driven from Scotland in 1638. He retired to Canterbury and is buried in its cathedral.

The third brother was Robert Wedderburn whose grandson was Alexander Wedderburn who was clerk of Dundee from 1557 to 1582. His son was Wedderburn of Kingennie who was a favourite of James VI of Scotland. He accompanied the king to England in 1603 and when he returned, the king presented him with a ring from his own hand. This line in the direct male line became extinct in 1761 upon the death of David Wedderburn, and the estates passed to the Scrymgeours who added the additional surname of Wedderburn to their own.

David Wedderburn's brother James had a son, Alexander Wedderburn of Blackness. Alexander Wedderburn was one of the commissioners for the Treaty of Ripon in 1641.

=== 18th century & Jacobite risings ===
Blackness House, in Dundee was owned by a branch of the Clan Wedderburn in the 17th and 18th centuries. Sir John Wedderburn of Blackness entered the British Army, and married and died in 1723. He had sold Blackness House to his cousin Alexander, who succeeded to the baronetcy.

However, Alexander was deposed from the office of Clerk of Dundee for having Jacobite sympathies. His eldest son Sir John Wedderburn, 5th Baronet of Blackness was also a Jacobite and served as a volunteer in Lord Ogilvy's regiment. He was taken prisoner at the Battle of Culloden in 1746 and was convicted and executed for treason. The baronetcy was then forfeited, a process known as attainder. His eldest son, John Wedderburn of Ballindean, was also at the Battle of Culloden but survived and fled to Jamaica. Several of the family, including his second son, later James Wedderburn-Colville, made their fortunes in the slave-run West Indian sugar plantations, or the London trading house that underpinned the venture.

In 1775, David Wedderburn of Balindean, who was MP for Perth and Postmaster General for Scotland, succeeded to the chiefship of the clan. He was also created a baronet. Alexander Wedderburn, the great-grandson of the judge, Sir Peter Wedderburn of Gosford, became a distinguished lawyer and Solicitor General for Scotland. He spoke out against the British government's policies in the American colonies, and predicted that they would break away from the British Empire. He was created Lord Loughborough in 1780 and Earl of Rosslyn in 1801.

== Clan Chief ==
The chiefship of the family is now held within the family of the Scrymgeour-Wedderburns, the Earls of Dundee. By family arrangement, the chiefship of Wedderburn is held by the eldest son of the earl who is himself chief of the Clan Scrymgeour. When the Wedderburn chief succeeds to the earldom, the chiefship passes to his heir.

== Castles ==
- Blackness House, a mansion in Dundee, was owned by the Wedderburn family from the mid 17th to early 18th century. (Disambiguation - Not medieval Blackness Castle, on the river Forth, West Lothian)

== See also ==
- Scottish clan
