= James Wedderburn (judge) =

Scottish judge

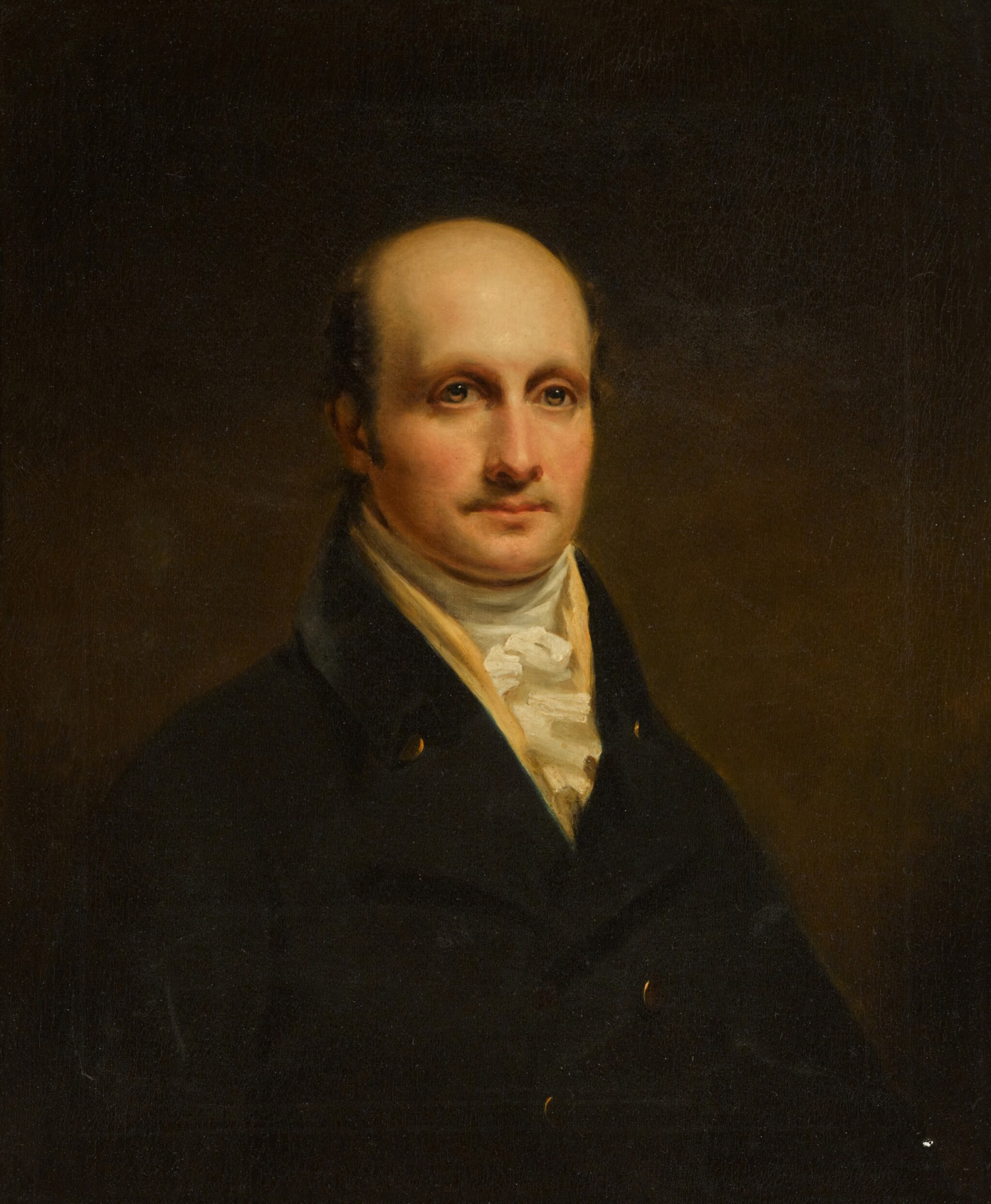
Portrait of the Hon. James Wedderburn (Studio of Sir Henry Raeburn)

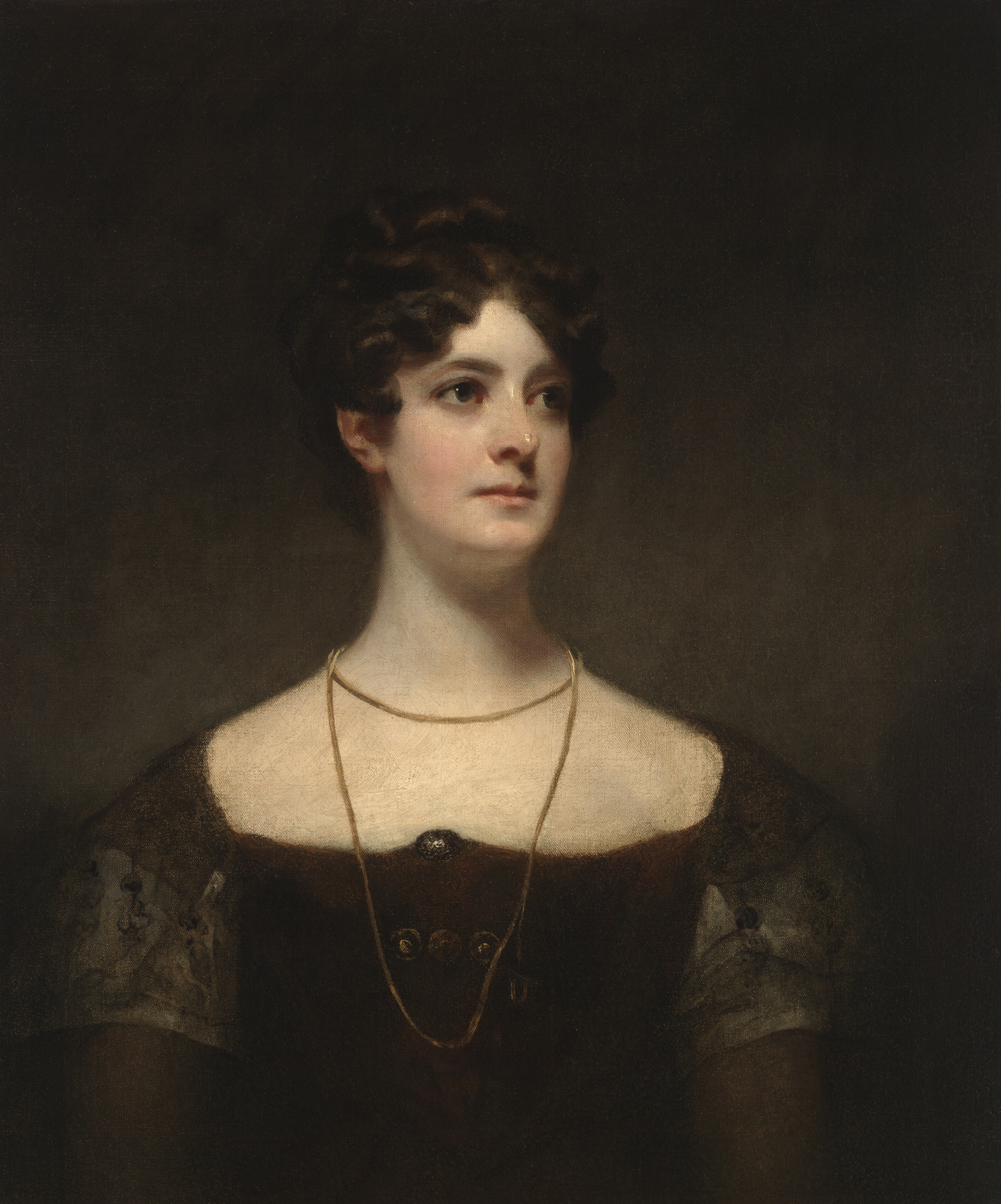
Isabella Clerk - Mrs. James Wedderburn, by Sir Henry Raeburn

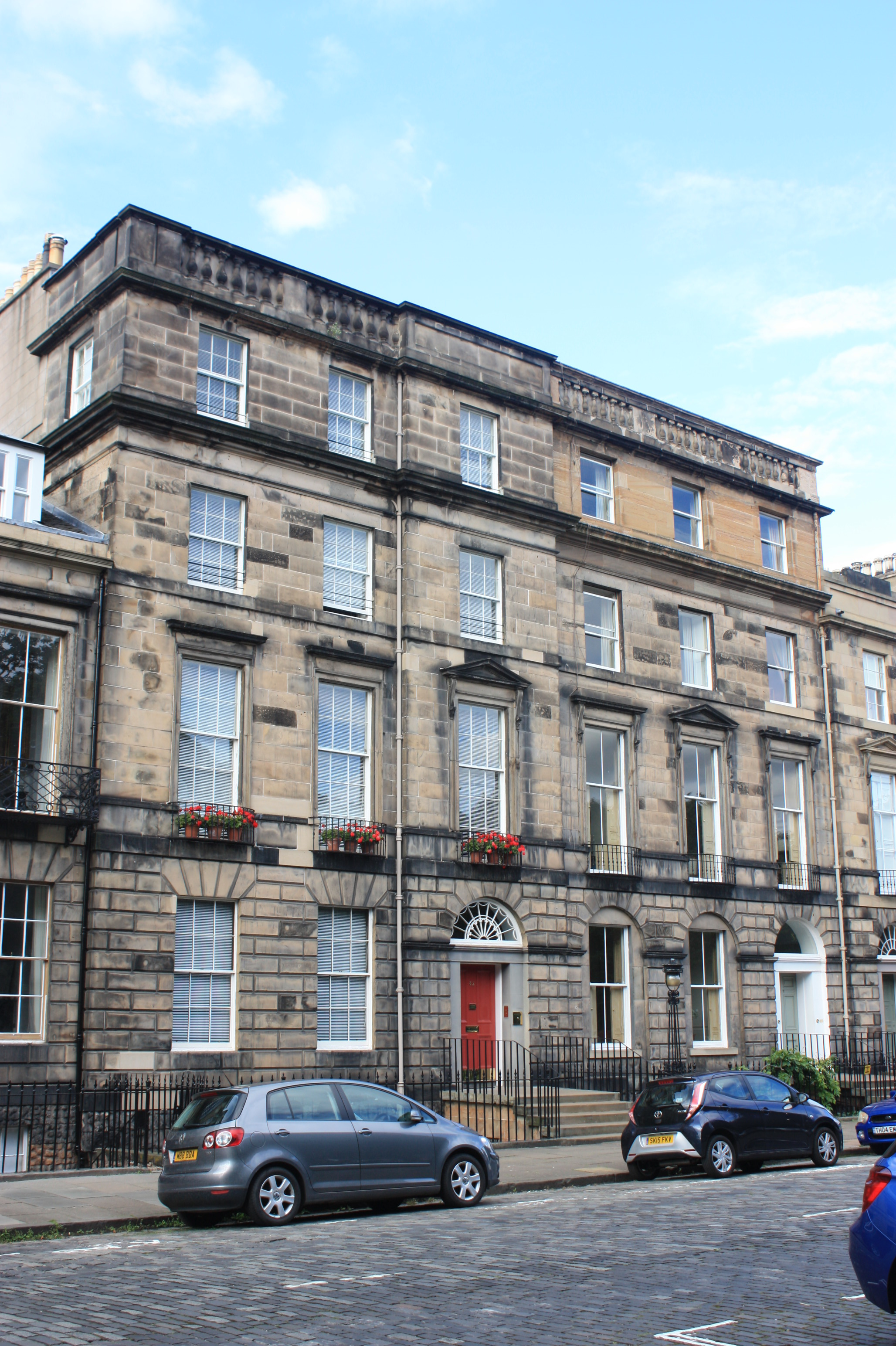
31 Heriot Row, Edinburgh (right)

The Honourable James Wedderburn FRSE (12 November 1782 – 7 November 1822) was a 19th-century Scottish judge who served as Solicitor General for Scotland from 1816, dying in office aged 39. He is sometimes called James Wedderburn-Colville.

== Life ==
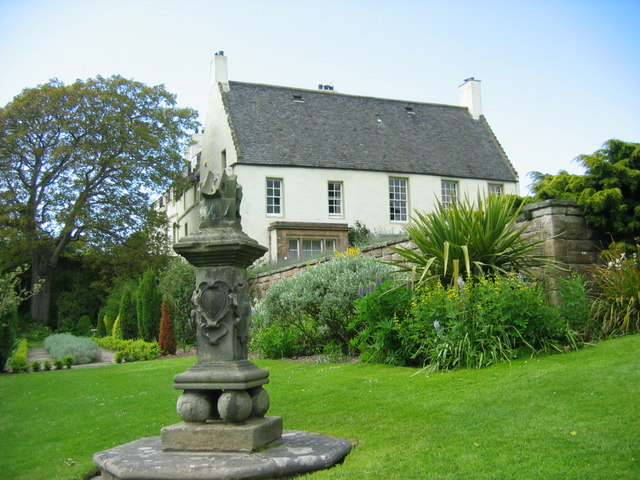
His birthplace, Inveresk Lodge

He was born in Inveresk House on 12 November 1782, the fourth son of Isabella Blackburn and James Wedderburn-Colville of Ochiltree House in Ayrshire. John Wedderburn of Ballindean, 6th Baronet of Blackness (1729–1803) was his father's elder brother. Both brothers spent decades buying and managing sugar plantations in the Caribbean, re-establishing the family fortune following the execution and attainder of their father the 5th baronet after the Jacobite uprising of 1745.

James was educated at the grammar school in Musselburgh. His father died in 1802 and, not yet of age, he became wealthy. The following year he was admitted as an advocate at the Scottish bar. In 1804 he undertook further study at Lincoln's Inn in London the aim at the English bar.

In 1810 Allan Maconochie, Lord Meadowbank appointed him Advocate Depute to Scotland. However he resigned in 1811 to take on the role of Sheriff of Peebles. In 1814 he was living with his family at 126 George Street in Edinburgh's New Town.

In July 1816 he was appointed Solicitor General for Scotland. In 1821 he was elected a Fellow of the Royal Society of Edinburgh. His proposer was Sir William Arbuthnot.

He lived his final years at 31 Heriot Row in Edinburgh. He died on 7 November 1822, aged 39, during a visit to his sister Lady Selkirk at St Mary's Isle in Kirkcudbrightshire. He is buried there.

== Family ==
He was brother to Andrew Colville.

In December 1813 he married Isabella Clerk (1789–1865), sister of Sir George Clerk, 6th Baronet of Penicuik and John Clerk Maxwell of Middlebie (father of James Clerk Maxwell). They had three daughters and four sons:

- James Wedderburn (1814–1863)
- Janet Isabella (1815–1852) married James Hay Mackenzie WS
- George Wedderburn (1817–1865)
- Jean (1818–1897) married Peter Blackburn of Killearn
- John Wedderburn (1820–1879)
- Andrew Wedderburn (1821–1896)
- Jemima (1823-1909), a noted artist, married Prof Hugh Blackburn, Peter's brother

== Artistic recognition ==
His wife Isabella was portrayed by Sir Henry Raeburn around the time of their marriage.
