= Andrew Colvile =

Scottish businessman (1779–1856)

- Born: Andrew Colvile-Wedderburn; 6 November 1779; Inveresk, East Lothian, Scotland
- Died: 3 February 1856 (aged 76); London, Middlesex England
- Employer: Hudson's Bay Company
- Father: James Wedderburn-Colville
- Relatives: James Wedderburn (brother)

Andrew Colvile (born Andrew Wedderburn; 6 November 1779 – 3 February 1856) was a Scottish businessman, notable as the governor of the Hudson's Bay Company, a huge organisation set up for the North American fur trade but also instrumental in the early history of Canada. He was also chairman of the West India Docks.

== Early life and family background ==
Andrew was born Andrew Wedderburn in 1779. His grandfather, Sir John Wedderburn, 5th Baronet of Blackness, was involved with the Jacobite rising of 1745, and was convicted of treason. The punishment for this was threefold: the death penalty, the confiscation of all his estates (he had property at Inveresk), and the attainting of his family, including the baronetcy. At least two of his sons moved to Jamaica, including Andrew's uncle and father. The former, John Wedderburn of Ballendean, is notable for the civil case brought under Scots law by his former slave Joseph Knight.

Andrew's father, James Wedderburn, set up as a doctor without academic qualification. After 28 years, James had become a wealthy slave-owner and sugar planter. In 1773 James moved back to Inveresk—the estate had been restored—and married. At some point James changed his name from Wedderburn to Wedderburn Colvile.

Andrew's sister Jean married Thomas Douglas, 5th Earl of Selkirk, in 1807. His brother James Wedderburn (born c. 1782) was Solicitor General for Scotland until his death in 1822; his posthumous daughter Jemima Blackburn became a highly regarded artist, and played the role of an elder sister to her cousin James Clerk Maxwell, the physicist. Andrew's other legitimate brother was Peter Wedderburn Ogilvy, who became a sea captain; his sons went into the army.

Andrew had a half-sibling whom he very publicly rejected: the son of his father by an enslaved woman in Jamaica. When the mixed-race Robert Wedderburn showed up at the family seat seeking to claim kinship, he was sent away with a flea in his ear. After that rejection, Robert wrote The Horrors of Slavery, which was circulated by the abolitionist movement. Andrew furiously denied the claims, and in turn insulted Robert's mother.

== Career ==
Andrew remained in Europe, inherited his father's estates and set up as a sugar broker (Wedderburn and Company). When his brother-in-law began buying into the Hudson's Bay Company, Andrew followed suit. By 1810, he was on the HBC board, and worked to rationalize the company's administration. In 1820, he was largely responsible for sending out Sir George Simpson to take charge of HBC affairs in North America. During Simpson's long administration (1821–1860) the two worked closely together, one in London business circles and the other in the wilds of Rupert’s Land, which eventually became western Canada.

After the Slavery Abolition Act of 1833, Andrew was one of the first plantation owners to develop indentured labour schemes to take workers from India to the British Caribbean. In January 1838, the wooden sailing ship Whitby left Calcutta carrying 246 workers for Colvile and Davidson's, Barkly & Company. The ship arrived in British Guiana in May 1838. Workers were assigned to different estates for five years. Andrew brought 78 men, two women and two girls from Calcutta to work on his Bellevue planation under an indenture of 5 years. Within a year of arriving at Colvile's Bellevue plantation, one of the children had reportedly died after being raped, and 12 of the men were dead (15 men died according to other reports).

In 1839, the British Emancipator and John Scoble (of the Anti-Slavery Society) reported cases of sickness and abuse at Colvile's Bellevue estate. Workers were reported to have been poorly treated, and the case became an example for abolitionists and humanitarians who argued that the indenture system was little better than slavery. In self-defence, Colvile reported that most of the coolies who died at Bellevue were elderly men.

These reports later led to official investigations. Critics of indentured labor including Joseph Sturge and the Society of Friends also argued that it was a revival of slavery and unfair to freed Black workers. This led to petitions and a debate in Parliament, and although repeal efforts failed, the British government suspended Indian emigration in 1838 for investigation, resuming it six years later under tighter oversight.

Though 1838 accounts still describe the estate as his, Bellevue was not listed in his will among properties still held by Colvile at his death.

== Marriages and children ==
His first wife was Elizabeth Susannah, daughter of John Wedderburn of Clapham, but she died in 1803, only a year after their marriage. They had no children, but he inherited the Wedderburn estate in Jamaica.

In 1806, he married the Hon. Mary Louisa Eden (1788–1858), fifth daughter of William Eden, 1st Baron Auckland, and was thus connected to an influential family of politicians and diplomats. The couple had four sons and 12 daughters:

1. Eleanor Colvile (1808–1824)
2. James William Colvile (1810–1880) was a lawyer, civil servant and then judge in India, and a judge on the Judicial Committee of the Privy Council, the court of last resort for the British colonies.
3. John Colvile (1811–1830)
4. Isabella Colvile (1812–1896) married a clergyman in rural England and was the mother of Francis Marindin, a key figure in early football.
5. George Colvile (1813–1814)
6. Louisa Colvile (1815–1836)
7. Emily Colvile (1817–1889)
8. Eden Colvile (1819–1893) was appointed Governor of Rupert's Land and also governor of the HBC.
9. Jean Colville (1820–1895)
10. Georgiana Mary Colvile (1822–1889) married Frederic Rogers, 1st Baron Blachford, a mandarin of Whitehall.
11. Charlotte Colvile (1823–)
12. Isalen Mary Colvile (1825–)
13. Caroline Colvile (1827–1846)
14. Margaret Agnes Colvile (1829–1905) in 1858 married the writer and publisher Charles Kegan Paul. Their son was Eden Paul, the socialist physician and translator.
15. Alice Douglas Colvile (1830–1845)
16. Katharine Colvile (July 1834–November 1834)

== Legacy ==
Several places were named after him, directly and indirectly. Many of them are near Kettle Falls, an ancient and important salmon fishing site on the upper reaches of the Columbia River, in what is today the state of Washington, near the Canada–United States border. In 1825 the HBC moved its trading post for that region from Spokane House and named the new site Fort Colvile (NB spelling). It was abandoned in 1870, and flooded over by the Grand Coulee Dam in 1940; the Colville people derive their name from their association with this trading post. In 1859, the U.S. Army established a new Fort Colville (two Ls) at Pinkney City, Washington, which was operational till 1882. The city of Colville, Washington was established nearby at about that time. Colville National Forest has its headquarters there. Near to the city is the Colville Air Force Station (now closed).

On Vancouver Island a new settlement was named Colville Town, but was renamed Nanaimo in 1860.

The Colville River (Alaska) is named after him.
