= John Wedderburn of Ballindean =

Scottish slavery profiteer (1729-1803)

Sir John Wedderburn of Ballindean
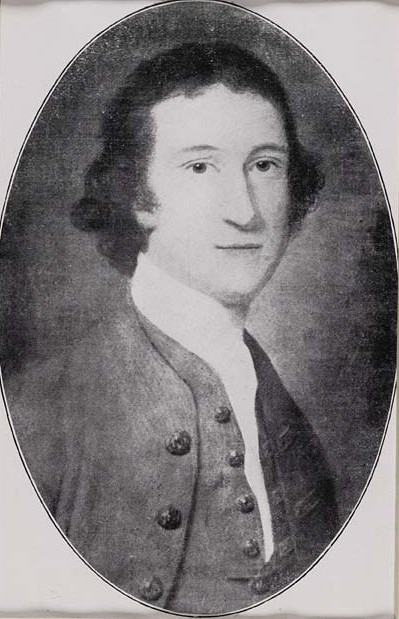
- Born: 21 February 1729; Perthshire, Scotland
- Died: 13 June 1803 (aged 74); Scotland
- Occupation: Planter
- Known for: Knight -v- Wedderburn
- Father: Sir John Wedderburn
- Relatives: James Wedderburn-Colville (brother); Robert Wedderburn (nephew); Catherine Read (cousin); Margaret Ogilvy (mother-in-law)

Sir John Wedderburn of Ballindean, 6th Baronet of Blackness (1729–1803) was a Scottish landowner who made a fortune in slave sugar in the West Indies. Born into a family of impoverished Perthshire gentry, his father, Sir John Wedderburn, 5th Baronet of Blackness, was executed for treason following the Jacobite uprising of 1745, and the young Wedderburn was forced to flee to the West Indies, where he eventually became the largest landowner in Jamaica. In 1769 he returned to Scotland with an enslaved man, one Joseph Knight, who was inspired by Somersett's Case, a judgment in London determining that slavery did not exist under English law. Wedderburn was sued by Knight in a freedom suit, and lost his case, establishing the principle that Scots law would not uphold the institution of slavery either. Wedderburn ended his days as a wealthy country gentleman, having restored his family fortune and recovered the title Baronet of Blackness.

Ballindean is a country estate midway between Perth and Dundee.

== Early life ==
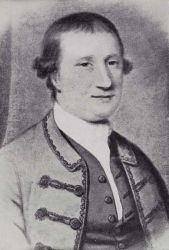
John Wedderburn's father, Sir John Wedderburn, 5th Baronet of Blackness

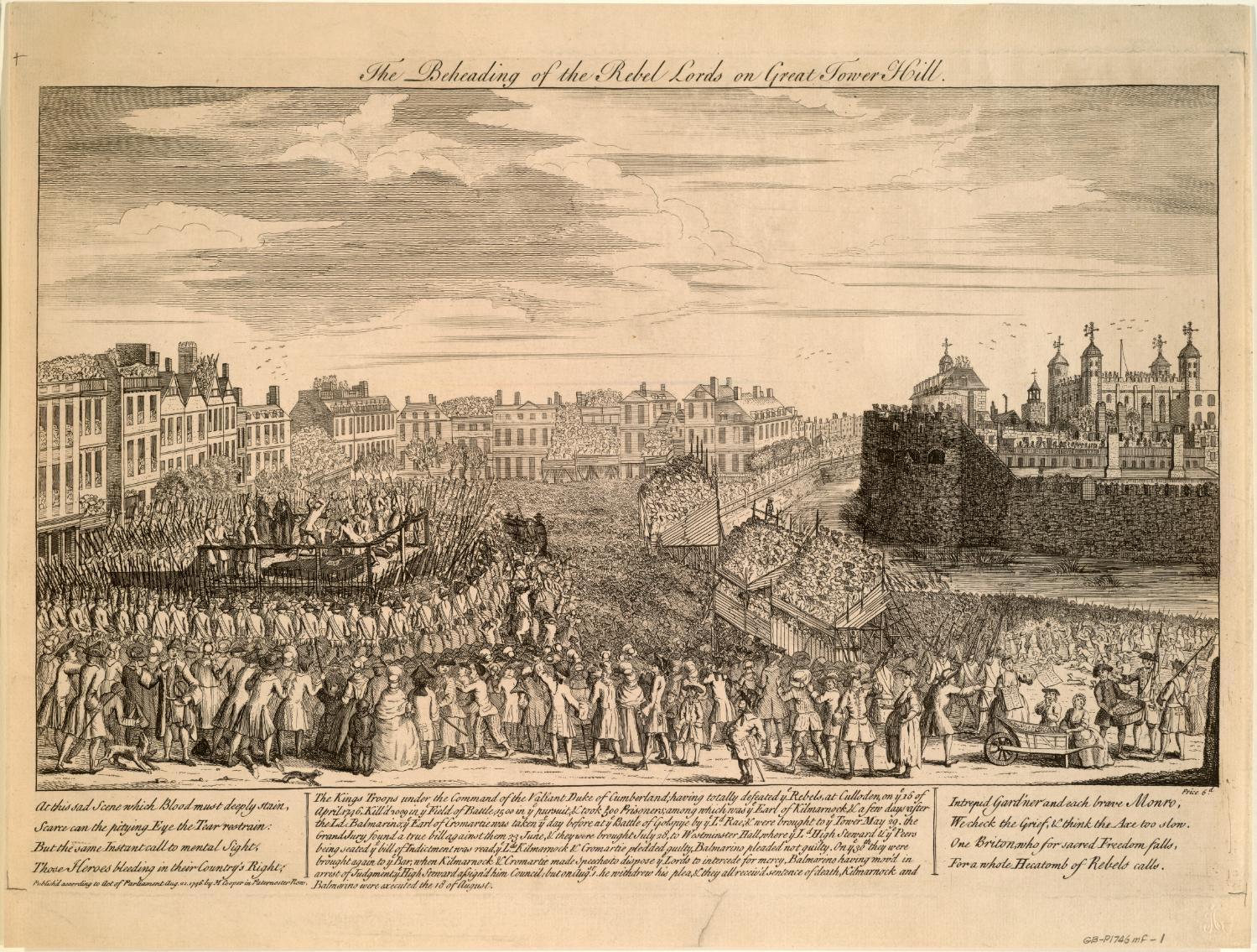
Execution of rebels following the Jacobite rebellion in 1745–1746. Published in London in 1746 by M. Cooper.

John Wedderburn was born in Scotland on 21 February 1729, the son of Sir John Wedderburn, 5th Baronet of Blackness, a Perthshire gentleman who had fallen on hard times. The Blackness in his title is Blackness House in Dundee rather than Blackness in Lothian just west of Edinburgh. Sir John Wedderburn's expectations of an inheritance were not fulfilled and he raised his large family in "a small farm with a thatched house and a clay floor, which he occupied with great industry, and thereby made a laborious but starving shift to support nine children who used to run about in the fields barefoot".

In 1745 Sir John joined the rebellion of Charles Edward Stuart against the Hanoverian crown, serving as a colonel in the Jacobite army before being captured at the Battle of Culloden and hauled off to London to face trial and execution. He was indicted for treason at St Margaret's Hill, Southwark on 4 November 1746, and was found guilty, despite arguing in his defence that he had not personally taken up arms against the Crown, and was executed at Kennington Common on 28 November 1746.

The young Wedderburn made his way to London to plead with such friends as his family still had for his father's rescue and pardon. His mission failed, and he was to witness his father's execution as a traitor by hanging, drawing and quartering, after which he was forced to return to Scotland where he found himself cut off from his inheritance and, without prospects, obliged to take ship to the New World. In Glasgow he found a ship's captain prepared to let him work his passage on a ship bound for the Caribbean.

== Career ==
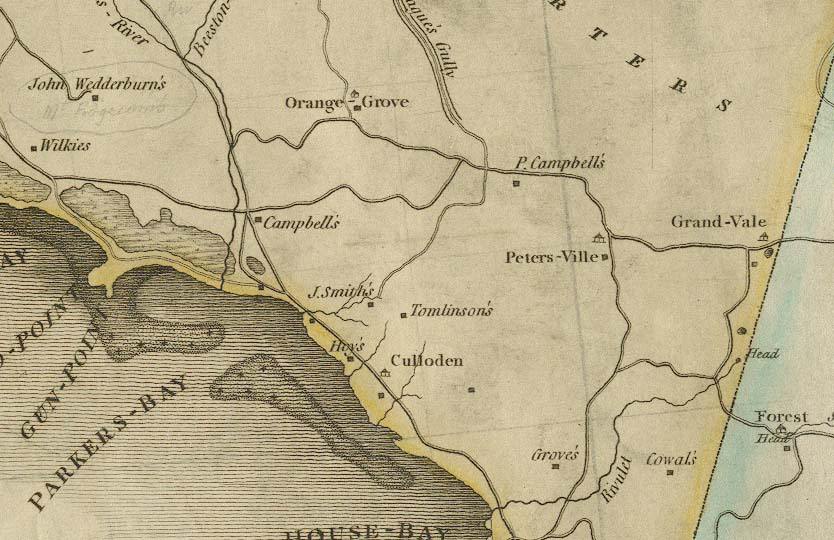
1804 map of Parker's Bay, Westmoreland, Jamaica, showing John Wedderburn's land on the left

Some time in early 1747 Wedderburn landed in the British Colony of Jamaica, an island which had been seized from the Spanish in 1655, and was fast becoming an important centre for the production and export of sugar. The young Wedderburn settled in the west of Jamaica, near Montego Bay, and tried his hand at a number of occupations, even practising for a few years as a medical doctor, despite having no qualifications. He managed to acquire sufficient capital to become a planter, investing in land, slaves and sugar, at the time an immensely profitable business. Wedderburn's sugar plantations prospered and he acquired huge amounts of land and wealth, becoming at one time the largest landowner in Jamaica, with around 17,000 acres of land. Other members of his family followed him, and the Wedderburns built up extensive estates in the colony.

In 1762 Wedderburn attended a "scramble" (an early form of slave auction) and purchased a young African boy aged 12 or 13 years, named Joseph Knight after the captain of the ship that had brought him to the West Indies. Rather than set Knight to work as a field hand, Wedderburn made him a house servant, teaching him to read and write and having him baptised as a Christian.

== Return to Scotland, first marriage and family ==
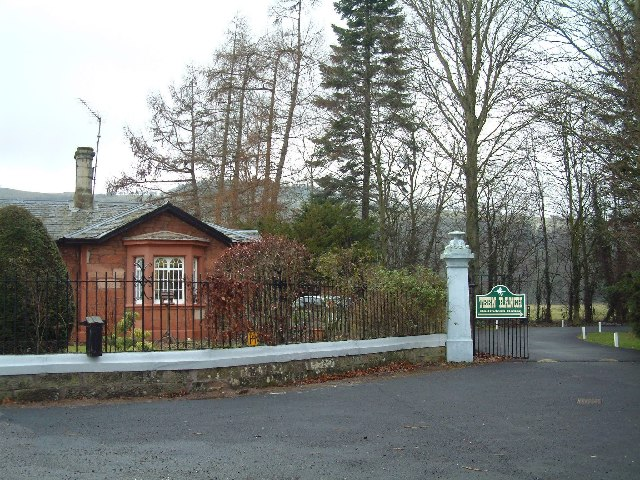
Gatehouse to Ballindean Estate

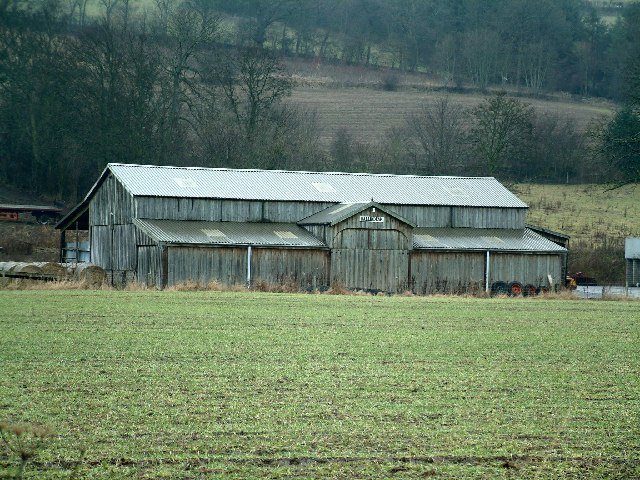
A barn on Ballindean Farm

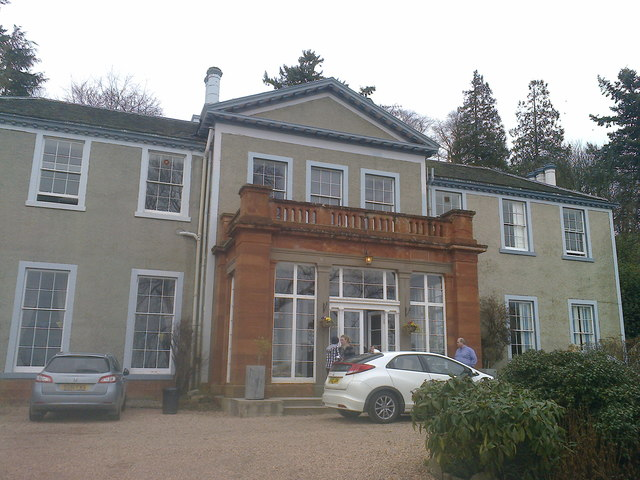
The 1832 Ballindean House

Seven years later, in 1769, Wedderburn returned to Scotland, and brought Joseph Knight with him. He returned to Perthshire where he sought to re-establish his family's respectability, marry and raise a family, and reclaim the title Baronet of Blackness. In 1769 he purchased the Ballindean estate, near Inchture, a village between Dundee and Perth on the northern side of the Firth of Tay. The Ballindean House (NB spelling), the listed building visible today, is an 1832 rebuild.

On 25 November 1769, aged 40 years, Wedderburn married his first wife, Margaret Ogilvy, daughter of David Ogilvy, de jure 6th Earl of Airlie and Margaret, Lady Ogilvy (i.e. from a family like his, attainted by the stain of treason). They married in Cortachy, Angus. They had four children, of whom three survived to adulthood:

- Margaret (1772–1807) Margaret married Philip Dundas, a senior official with the East India Company, and later an MP and Governor of Prince of Wales Island, now known as Penang.
- Jean (1773–1861). Jean married John Hope Oliphant, also of Prince of Wales Island. (Her husband was a younger son of Robert Oliphant of Rossie, Postmaster General for Scotland, a position later held by her brother David.). Dundas and Oliphant are buried next to each other at the Old Protestant Cemetery, George Town, Penang.
- Sir David Wedderburn, 1st Baronet.(1775–1858)

Margaret Ogilvy died two weeks after David's birth.

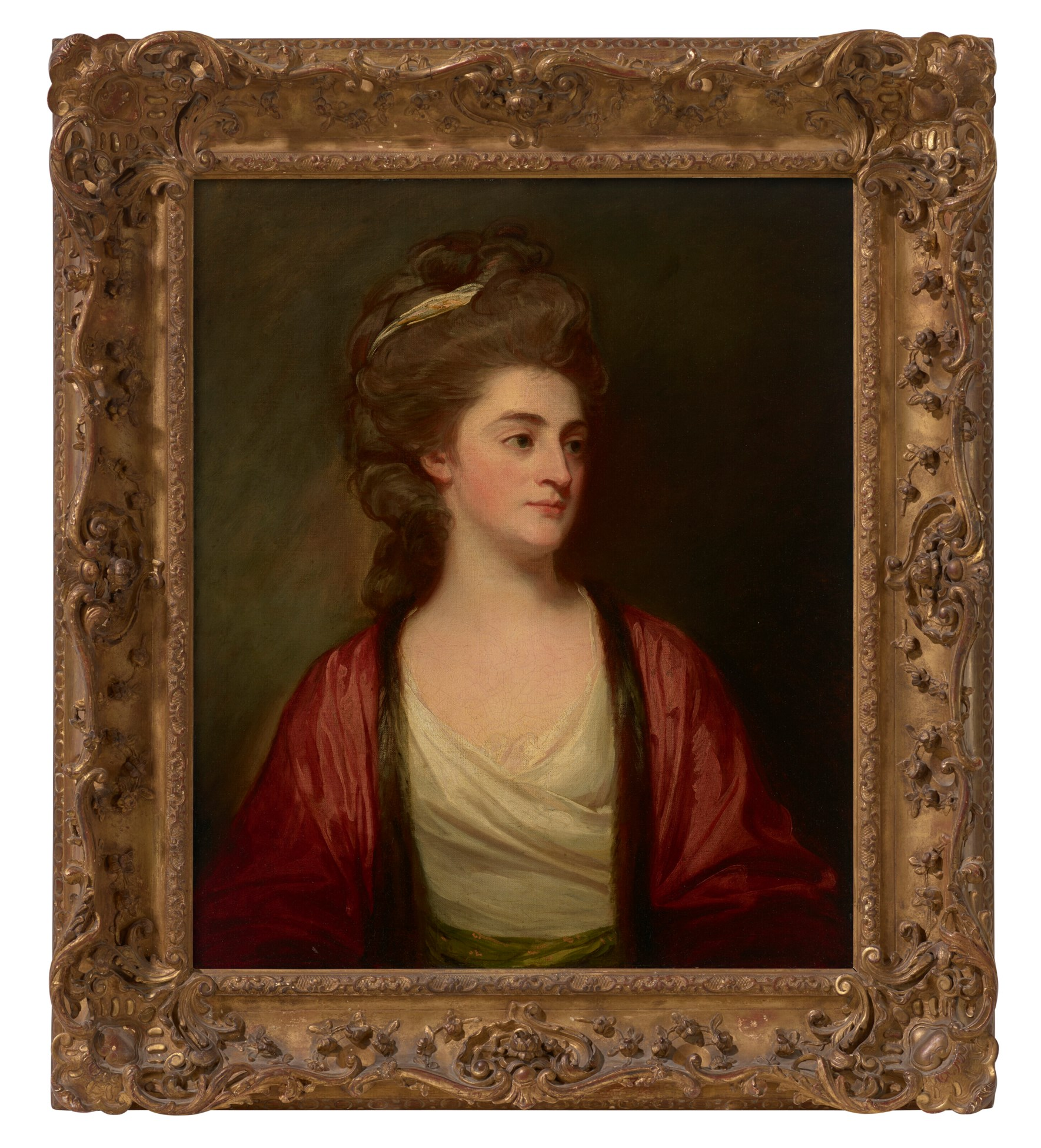
Portrait of Lady Alicia Wedderburn by George Romney

Wedderburn's second wife was Alicia Dundas, daughter of Col. James Dundas, of Dundas. The couple had the following children:

- Sir John Wedderburn, 2nd Baronet (1789–1862), married in Bombay Henrietta Louisa, daughter of William Milburn, Esq.
- Mara/Maria
- Susan
- Louisa Dorothea, married General Sir John Hope, 4th Earl of Hopetoun
- Anne (1788–1867), married Sir John Hope, Bart., of Craighall and Pinkie

Meanwhile, Joseph Knight fell in love with a servant girl from Dundee, one Annie Thompson, and Wedderburn gave permission for the couple to marry.

== Knight v Wedderburn ==
In around 1778, Knight became aware of the ruling in the Somerset Case in England, which held that slavery did not exist under English law. Perhaps assuming (wrongly) that a ruling in an English court applied equally in Scotland, Knight demanded his freedom, and even asked for back wages, which Wedderburn refused. Wedderburn was indignant, feeling that he had bestowed considerable gifts on Knight by educating and taking care of him. Soon, Thompson was pregnant with Knight's child and Wedderburn dismissed her, refusing Knight permission to go as well. When Wedderburn found Knight packing his bags to leave, he summoned the magistrate and had him arrested and thrown into Perth jail. Knight managed to persuade John Swinton, the deputy sheriff at Perth Sheriff Court, that he was entitled to his freedom. Knight therefore brought a claim before the Justices of the Peace court in Perth, a case that would be known as Knight -v- Wedderburn.

=== Appeal to the Sheriff ===
At first, events moved in Wedderburn's favour. The Justices of the Peace found against Knight, but the latter soon appealed to the Sheriff Court of Perth, who found against Wedderburn, stating that:

"the state of slavery is not recognised by the laws of this kingdom, and is inconsistent with the principles thereof: That the regulations in Jamaica, concerning slaves, do not extend to this kingdom".

=== Appeal to the Court of Session ===
Henry Home, Lord Kames.

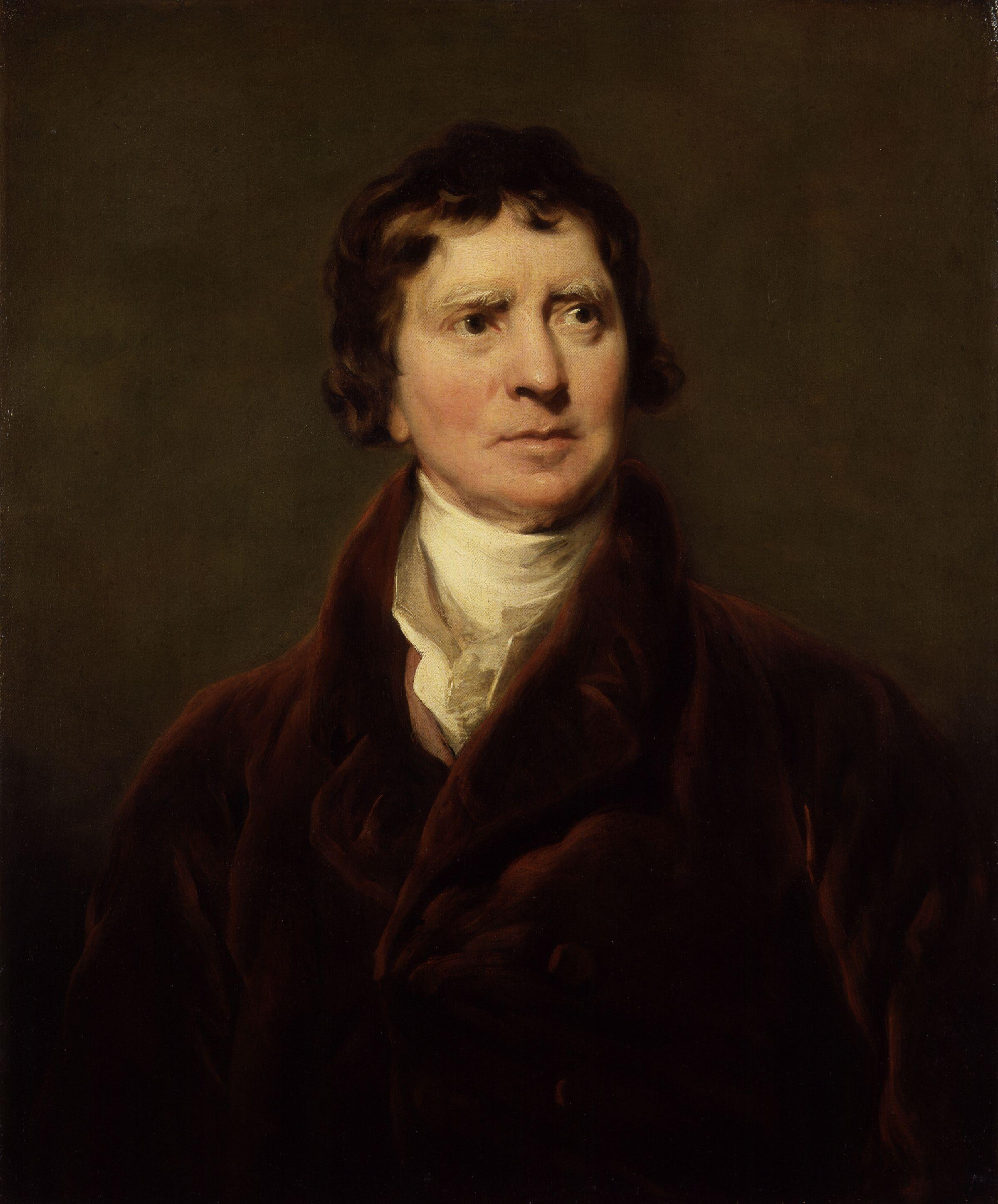
Henry Dundas, 1st Viscount Melville by Sir Thomas Lawrence

In 1777 Wedderburn in turn appealed to the Court of Session in Edinburgh, Scotland's supreme civil court, arguing that Knight still owed perpetual service, in the same manner as an indentured servant or an apprenticed artisan. The case was important enough that it was given a full panel of twelve judges including Lord Kames, the important legal and social historian.

Knight was represented by Henry Dundas, the Lord Advocate, who was outraged by Knight's condition. Dundas was in turn helped in the preparation of the case by James Boswell and Samuel Johnson, who took a keen interest in the case, lending their considerable weight to Knight's defence. Their argument was that 'no man is by nature the property of another'. Since there was no proof that Knight had given up his natural freedom, he should be set free. Conversely, Wedderburn's counsel argued that commercial interests, which underpinned Scotland's prosperity, should prevail.

In an unexpected decision, Lord Kames stated that 'we sit here to enforce right not to enforce wrong' and the court emphatically rejected Wedderburn's appeal, ruling by an 8 to 4 majority that:

"the dominion assumed over this Negro, under the law of Jamaica, being unjust, could not be supported in this country to any extent: That, therefore, the defender had no right to the Negro’s service for any space of time, nor to send him out of the country against his consent: That the Negro was likewise protected under the act 1701, c.6. from being sent out of the country against his consent."

In effect, slavery was not recognised by Scots law and runaway slaves (or 'perpetual servants') could be protected by the courts, if they wished to leave domestic service or were resisting attempts to return them to slavery in the colonies.

== Later life and second marriage ==
Wedderburn, undismayed by his defeat, devoted the rest of his days to upholding the rights of slaveholders (see London Society of West India Planters and Merchants), and was eventually successful in claiming the title 6th Baronet of Blackness, thereby restoring his family's respectability after the disaster of defeat and humiliation at Culloden.

On 27 December 1780 he married again, this time to Alice Dundas, who was related to Henry Dundas, 1st Viscount Melville, the Tory politician. According to research by the Legacies of British Slave-ownership project, there were three boys and four girls born to this marriage. The eldest son, James, died before his father. John (1789–1862) succeeded his half-brother David as the second baronet. (Genealogist Joseph Foster writes that the second baronet's children included David (1835–1882) and William (1838–1918), the third and fourth baronets respectively; the eldest son John had joined the Bengal Civil Service and died in the Indian Mutiny of 1857.) Alexander (1791–1839) was a soldier. The four girls were Maria, Susan, Louisa Dorothea, and Anne. On 9 February 1803, aged 16, Louisa married General John Hope, 4th Earl of Hopetoun. Anne married Sir John Hope, 11th Baronet Hope of Craighall.

John Campbell, 1st Baron Campbell recounted meeting John Wedderburn around 1798. He asked whether Wedderburn was "of the family of" Alexander Wedderburn, 1st Earl of Rosslyn, to which the reply was, "The Chancellor is of mine."

John Wedderburn died on 13 June 1803, aged 74 years.

== In fiction ==
Sir John Wedderburn features as a character in James Robertson's novel, Joseph Knight (2003).

== Extended family ==
Wedderburn's first cousin Catherine Read, a portrait painter, took in his sisters after the execution of the 5th baronet.

Wedderburn's brother James Wedderburn-Colville had several children. One whom he did not acknowledge was Robert Wedderburn, a radical preacher and a tireless campaigner against slavery, who published in 1824 an anti-slavery book entitled The Horrors of Slavery, printed by William Dugdale and possibly coauthored by George Cannon.

Others of James's children include Andrew Colvile, governor of the Hudson's Bay Company; Jean, who married Thomas Douglas, 5th Earl of Selkirk; and James Wedderburn, Solicitor General for Scotland until his death in 1822. Another son, Peter, went to sea; one of the ships he captained was the Arniston (East Indiaman).

His grandchildren included Jemima Blackburn (1823 – 1909), an artist much respected for her observations and illustrations of birds.

== See also ==
- List of slave owners
- Clan Wedderburn
