= Sir David Wedderburn, 3rd Baronet =

British politician

Sir David Wedderburn 3rd Baronet
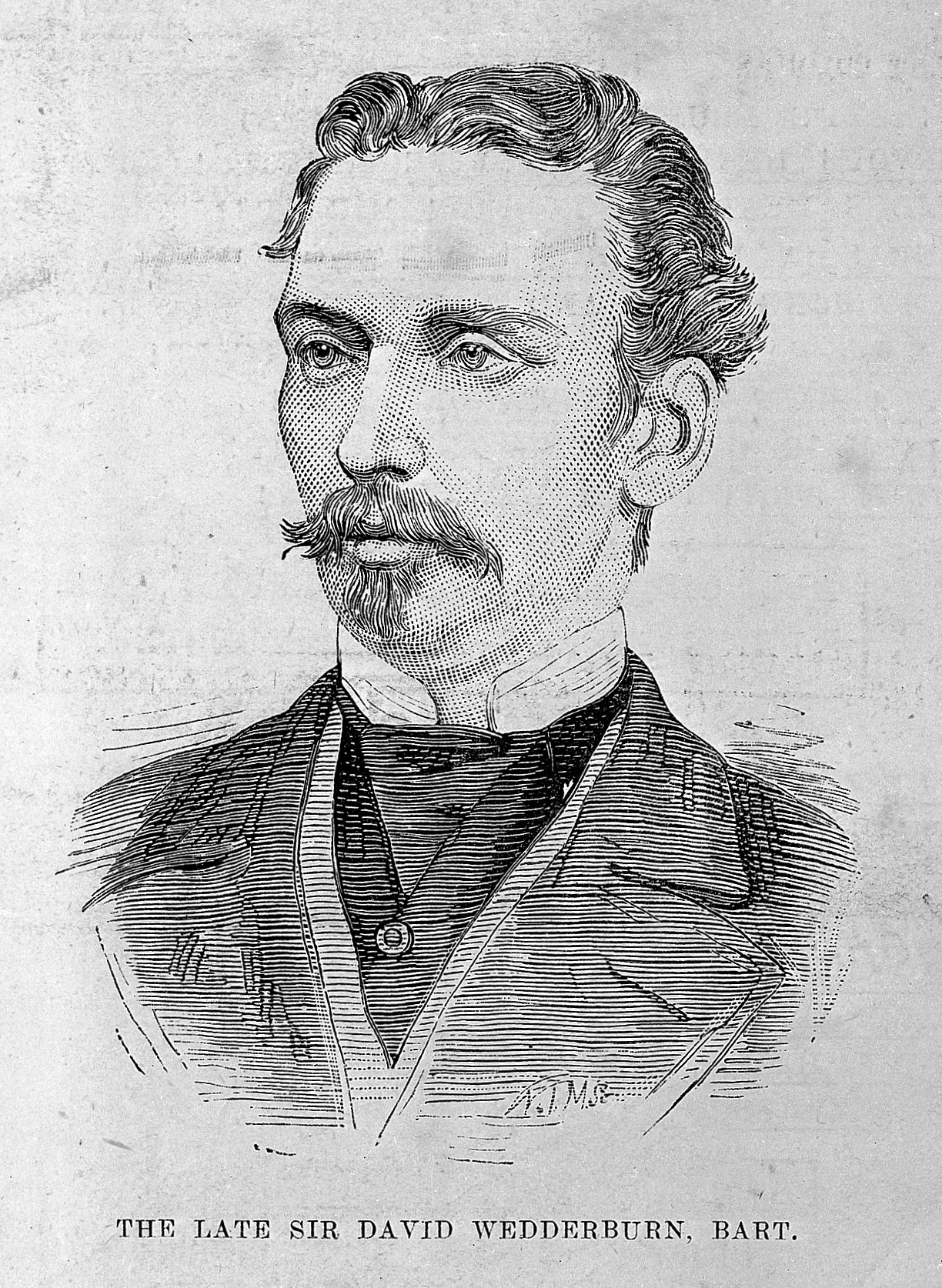
- Portrait in The Illustrated London News (30 Sep 1882)

Member of Parliament for South Ayrshire
- In office 1868–1874
- Preceded by: New constituency
- Succeeded by: Claud Alexander

Member of Parliament for Haddington Burghs
- In office 1879–1882
- Preceded by: William Hay
- Succeeded by: Alexander Craig Sellar

Personal details
- Born: 20 December 1835
- Died: 18 September 1882 (aged 46)
- Resting place: St. Michael's churchyard, Inveresk
- Party: Liberal
- Parents: Sir John Wedderburn (father); Henrietta Louise Milburn (mother)
- Relatives: Sir David Wedderburn (paternal grandfather); William Wedderburn (brother)
- Education: Trinity College, Cambridge

Sir David Wedderburn, 3rd Baronet (20 December 1835 – 18 September 1882) was a British politician.

== Life ==
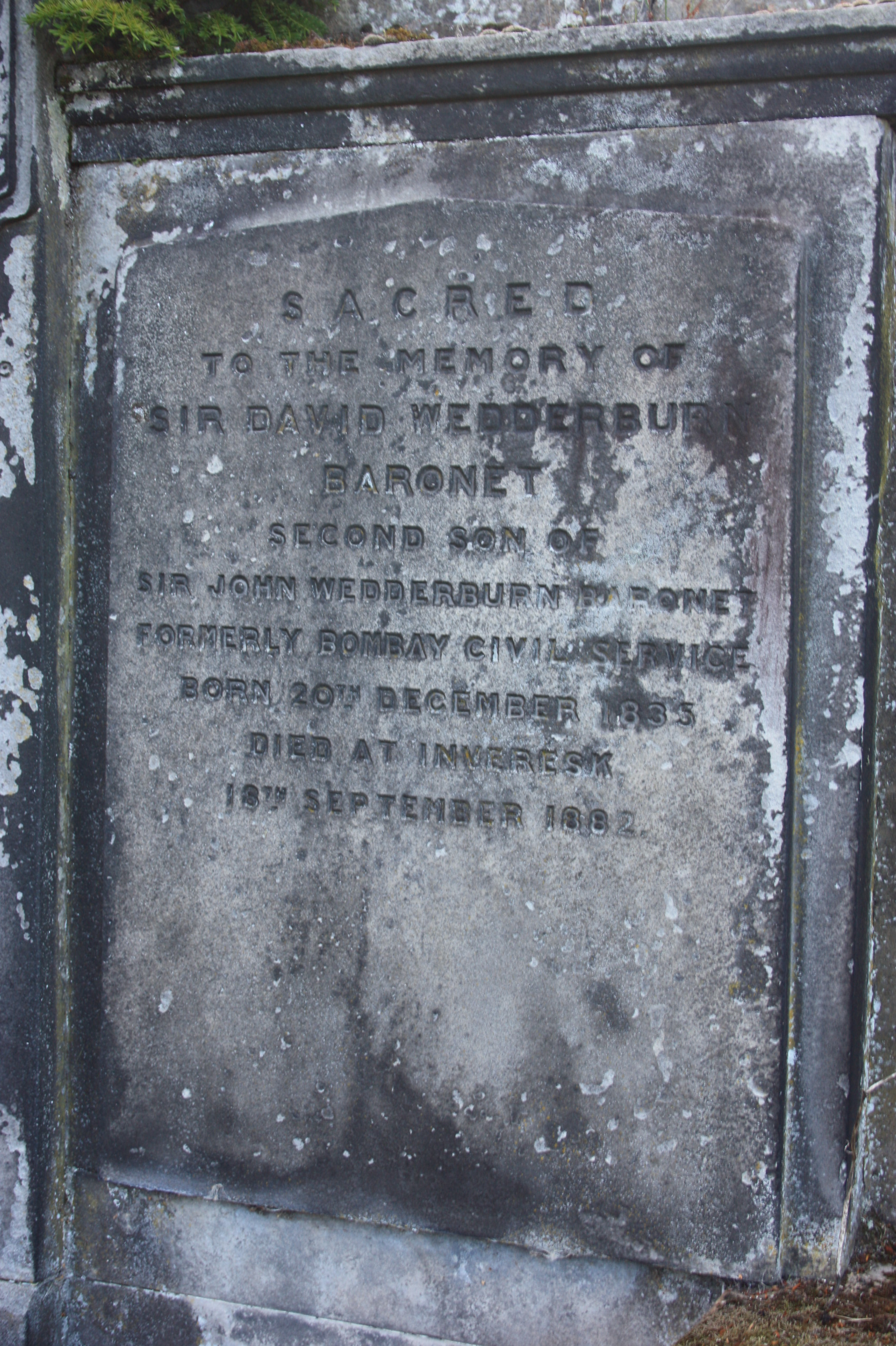
The grave of Sir David Wedderburn, 3rd baronet, Inveresk churchyard

David Wedderburn was the second son of Sir John Wedderburn, 2nd Baronet, and Henrietta Louise Milburn. His grandfather, Sir David, had had the title of the Wedderburn baronetcy restored to the family, following the attainder after the Jacobite rising of 1745 and the subsequent regain of fortune via the slave sugar plantations of Jamaica.

He studied law at Trinity College, Cambridge, where he graduated as senior optime in 1858. He was called to the Scottish bar as an advocate in 1861. He succeeded to the title upon his father's death in 1862, his elder brother John having died in the Indian Rebellion of 1857.

He was a justice of the peace for Midlothian and a captain in the Midlothian Yeomanry.

He was elected as a Liberal Member of Parliament for South Ayrshire in 1868, holding the seat until 1874. He was then elected for Haddington Burghs in an 1879 by-election, resigning in 1882 by becoming Steward of the Manor of Northstead.

In April 1873, he visited Victor Hugo in Guernsey. He confessed his republican convictions to the great French poet, but added : "If I said that aloud, I would not be re-elected".

He travelled widely, returning to India as an adult, and visiting the United States, Canada, China, Japan, Java, Iceland, South Africa, and throughout Europe. His travel journals and his political writings were edited and published after his death by his youngest sister, Louisa Jane, assisted by her husband Edward Hope Percival. He wrote for The Nineteenth Century and The Fortnightly Review, two of the most prominent periodicals of the time.

He lived at Inveresk Lodge, south of Musselburgh. He never married. On his death in 1882, the title went to his youngest brother, William Wedderburn, one of the founders of the Indian National Congress.

He is buried in St. Michael's churchyard in Inveresk. The grave lies midway along the western boundary of the original churchyard, backing onto the Victorian cemetery.

== Sources ==
- Debrett's House of Commons and the Judicial Bench, 1870, page 282

Parliament of the United Kingdom
New constituency	Member of Parliament for South Ayrshire; 1868–1874	Succeeded by Claud Alexander
Preceded by William Hay	Member of Parliament for Haddington Burghs; 1879–1882	Succeeded by Alexander Craig Sellar
Baronetage of the United Kingdom
Preceded by John Wedderburn	Baronet (of Balindean, Perthshire); 1862–1882	Succeeded by William Wedderburn
