= Robert Wedderburn =

British-Jamaican radical and abolitionist

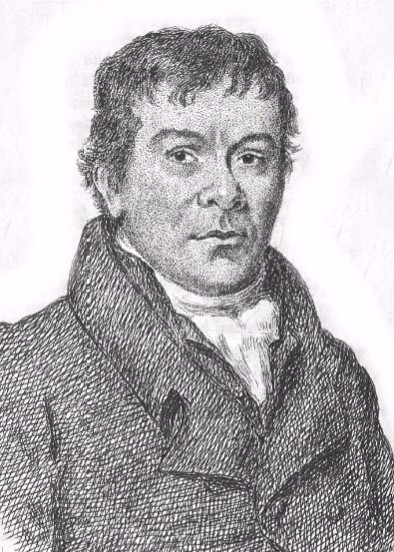
- Born: 1762; Jamaica
- Died: 1835/1836? London, England
- Known for: The Horrors of Slavery, published in 1824
- Parent(s): James Wedderburn; Rosanna

Robert Wedderburn (1762 – 1835/1836?) was a British-Jamaican radical and abolitionist of multiracial descent active in early 19th-century London. Wedderburn was born in Kingston, Jamaica, an illegitimate son of an enslaved Black woman, Rosanna, and Scottish sugar planter James Wedderburn. During his life, Robert Wedderburn sought to reconcile his political priorities and religious views.

Influenced by millenarian ideas, he moved from Methodism and towards Unitarian leanings, before rejecting Christianity and embracing a deist outlook. An early freethinker, the combination of his deist views, associations with well-known radicals and atheists, and utopian political ideals, led to his arrest for breach of blasphemy laws. In 1824 he published The Horrors of Slavery, a tract which influenced the Abolitionist movement.

== Biography ==
=== Early life ===
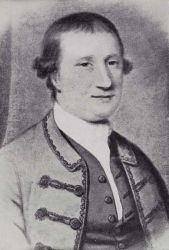
Sir John Wedderburn, 5th Baronet of Blackness; Robert Wedderburn's grandfather

Robert Wedderburn was born in Jamaica in around 1762. His mother Rosanna was a black woman of dark brown complexion, and was enslaved in his white Scottish father's house as a house worker. His father was James Wedderburn, a slave-owner and plantation owner who was born in Scotland, and was the son of Sir John Wedderburn, 5th Baronet of Blackness, who was executed for treason following the Jacobite rising of 1745. Following this catastrophe, the young James and his brother John Wedderburn of Ballendean fled Scotland for the West Indies. James Wedderburn settled in Kingston, making a living as a medical doctor before making his fortune as a sugar plantation owner. While in Jamaica he fathered children with several enslaved women.

While Rosanna was five months pregnant with his third child, having already given birth to two children prior to that, he sold her to her previous enslaver.

James Wedderburn stipulated, however, that Rosanna's child when born should be legally free, and he officially registered both Robert and an elder brother James as free men. In later years, James Wedderburn returned to live in Britain, where his legitimate son and heir Andrew Colvile defended his father when these details were made public in the British press, denied the paternity and further claimed Rosanna was both promiscuous and unable to control her temper.

Although born free, Wedderburn was raised in a harsh environment, as his mother was often flogged due to her "violent and rebellious temper". She was eventually re-sold away from her son, who was then raised by his maternal grandmother, a woman known as "Talkee Amy".

To escape the insecurity and abuse of the plantation, Wedderburn signed on with the Royal Navy at the age of 16. On the ships, the quality of food and living conditions were abysmal, and it was during this time that Wedderburn became increasingly opposed to the method of punishments used by the Royal Navy.

=== Arrival in Britain ===
Robert Wedderburn arrived in Britain aged 17 and settled down in St. Giles, London, an ethnically diverse district of the city which was inhabited by numerous free people of colour, Jews, Indian sailors and Irish immigrants. During this period, Wedderburn found employment as a tailor, becoming trained in the profession; though he was also reported to have been involved in occasional incidents of petty theft.

Through means that remain unclear (it is possible that he had been an apprentice in Jamaica or had learned while in the Navy), Wedderburn eventually became a journeyman tailor. As he referred to himself as a "flint" tailor, this suggests he was registered in the book of trades and shared values typical of other artisans - including pride in his craft and a belief in economic independence. Unfortunately, the instability of his career made him increasingly susceptible to the effects of a trade recession, inflation and food shortages, and he was soon reduced to part-time mending work on the outskirts of town.

By now married and desperate for money during one of his wife's pregnancies, Wedderburn visited his father's family at Inveresk near Edinburgh. He recalled that his father did not deny him to be his son "but called me a lazy fellow, and said he would do nothing for me. From his cook I had one draught of small beer, and his footman gave me a cracked sixpence". Wedderburn thereafter dabbled in petty theft and keeping a bawdy house. In 1824, Bell's Life in London published a letter from Robert Wedderburn addressed to William Wilberforce giving an account of his origins and his father's failure to provide for him. It also published his alleged half-brother, Andrew Colvile's, reply citing his father's denial of paternity and threatening to sue the paper if it published any further slanders.

=== Radicalism and activity ===
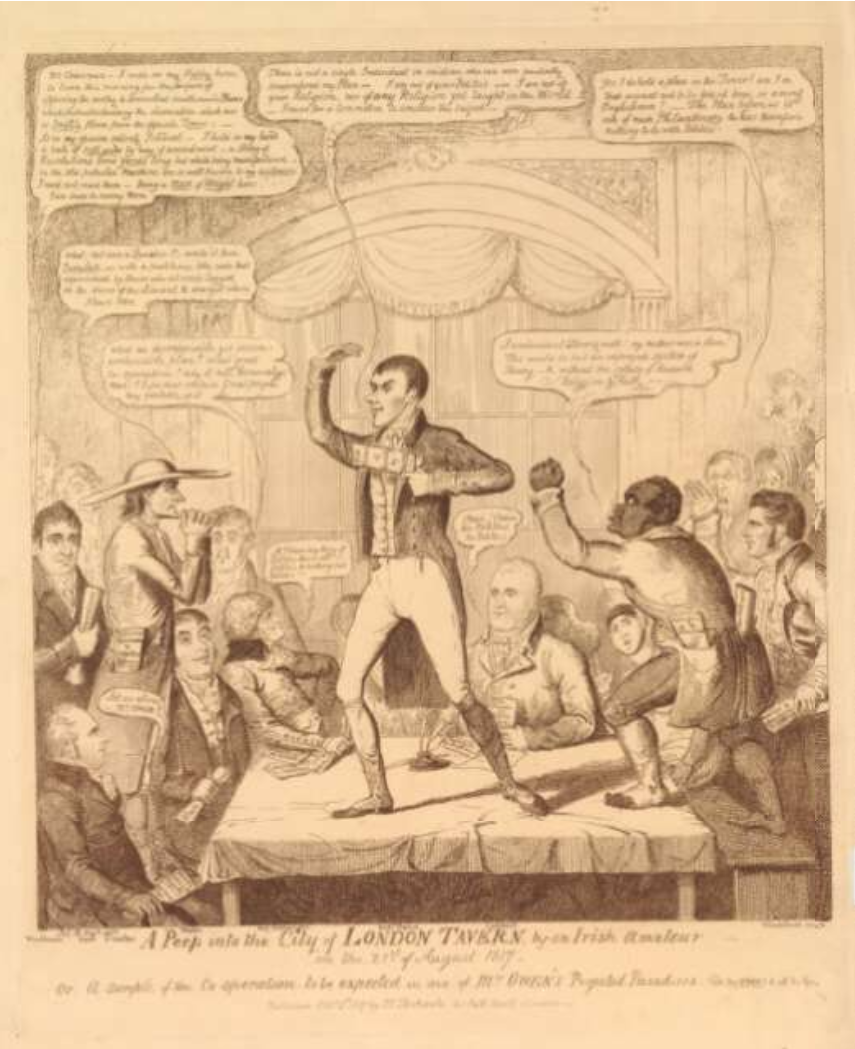
A Peep into the City of London Tavern by George Cruikshank, 1817, caricatures Robert Owen (centre) and Robert Wedderburn (right).

In 1786, Wedderburn stopped to listen to a Wesleyan preacher he heard in Seven Dials. Influenced by a mixture of Arminian, millenarian, Calvinist, and Unitarian ideas, he converted to be a Methodist, and soon published a small theological tract called Truth Self Supported: or, a Refutation of Certain Doctrinal Errors Generally Adopted in the Christian Church. Although this work contained no explicit mention of slavery, it does suggest Wedderburn's future path in subversive and radical political action.

Wedderburn was sufficiently well known to be the subject of at least one satirical print by the caricaturist George Cruikshank, who in 1817 published "A Peep into The City of London Tavern" in which Wedderburn is caricatured alongside the social reformer Robert Owen. The central figure in Cruikshank's 1819 print The New Union Club may also be a caricature of Wedderburn.

Politically influenced by Thomas Spence, Wedderburn was an impassioned speaker and became de facto leader of the Spencean Society in 1817 after the nominal leaders were arrested on suspicion of high treason. Wedderburn published fiery periodicals advocating republican revolution, using violence if necessary, to bring about redistribution of property in Britain and the West Indies. In 1824, he published an anti-slavery book entitled The Horrors of Slavery, printed by William Dugdale and possibly coauthored by George Cannon.

To promote his religious message, he opened his own Unitarian chapel in Hopkins Street in Soho, London. After, he began to question Christian tenets. He was later associated with the freethought movement, including popular deists and atheists such as Richard Carlile. He also campaigned for freedom of speech.

=== Prison ===
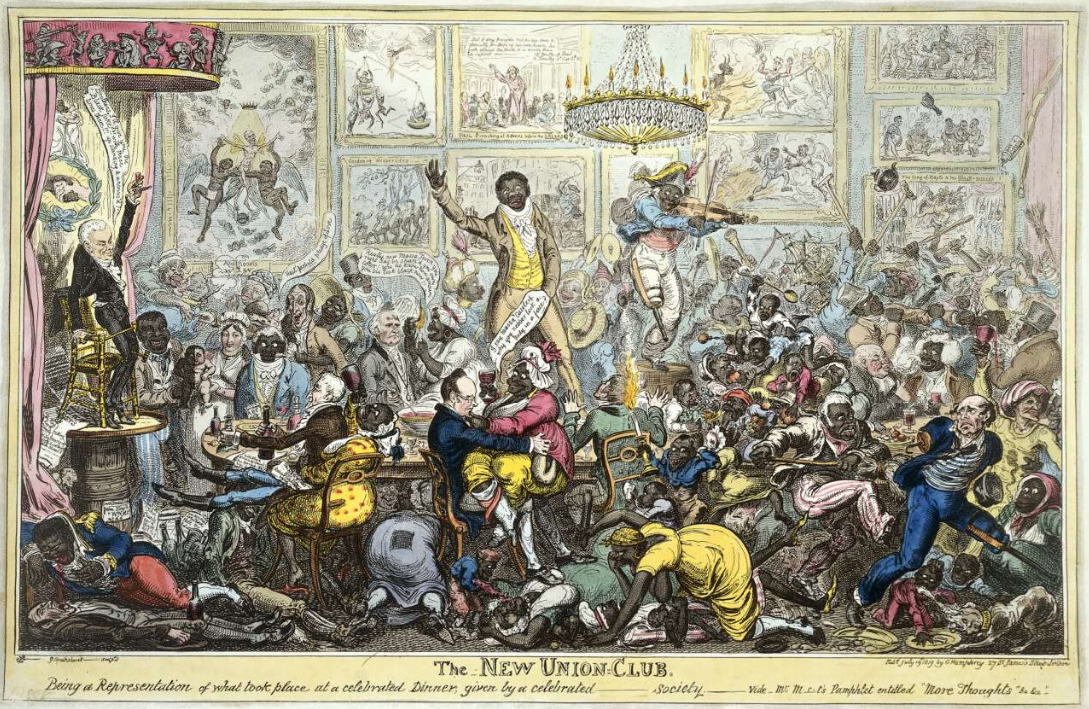
New Union Club by George Cruikshank, 1819. The central figure may be a caricature of Robert Wedderburn

Robert Wedderburn served several prison terms. According to Peter Linebaugh (2000) it is recorded that Wedderburn "did time in Cold Bath Fields, Dorchester, and Giltspur Street Compter prisons for theft, blasphemy, and keeping a bawdy house." While imprisoned, alongside his associate Richard Carlile, Wedderburn wrote a letter to Francis Place.

In 1831, at the age of 68, he was arrested and sent to Giltspur Street Prison and sentenced to two years in jail, having been convicted of keeping a brothel. On his release he appears to have gone to New York City, where a newspaper records his involvement in a fraud case and refers to him as "a tailor and breeches maker, field preacher, anti-bank deposite politician, romance writer, circulating librarian, and ambulating dealer in drugs, deism, and demoralization in general". He returned to London shortly after. His last mention in the historical record was in March 1834 when a Home Office informer listed him as present among the congregation at the Theobald's Road Institute.

=== Death and legacy ===
The exact year of his death is unknown, although it appears to have been before official registers of death began to be kept in 1837. He may be the "Robert Wedderborn" who died aged 72 in Bethnal Green and was buried in a non-conformist ceremony on 4 January 1835.

Some have located Wedderburn's deism, radicalism, and secularism within a history of British humanism. The Humanist Heritage website recalls that "Wedderburn and others like him fostered a humanist tradition of rationalism, compassion, and tolerance, suffering the effects of blasphemy laws the like of which humanists continue to fight today."

== Descendants ==
The British Labour politician Bill Wedderburn, Baron Wedderburn of Charlton, was a direct descendant of Robert Wedderburn.

== Sources ==
- Chase, Malcolm (2008) [2004]. "Wedderburn, Robert (1762–1835/6?)". Oxford Dictionary of National Biography (online ed.). Oxford University Press. doi:10.1093/ref:odnb/47120. (Subscription, Wikipedia Library access or UK public library membership required.)
- Hunt, Nadine (2012). "Remembering Africans in diaspora: Robert Wedderburn's 'freedom narrative'". In Ojo, Olatunji; Hunt, Nadine (eds.). Slavery in Africa and the Caribbean: A History of Enslavement and Identity since the 18th Century. London: I.B. Tauris. pp. 175–198. ISBN 9781780761152.
- McCalman, Iain (1986). "Anti-Slavery and Ultra-Radicalism in Early Nineteenth Century England: The Case of Robert Wedderburn". Slavery and Abolition. 7 (2): 99–117. doi:10.1080/01440398608574906.
- McCalman, Iain (1988). Radical underworld: prophets, revolutionaries, and pornographers in London, 1795-1840. Cambridge University Press. pp. 50–72. ISBN 0-521-30755-4.
