= William Wedderburn =

British civil servant and politician

Sir William Wedderburn Baronet

Member of Parliament for Banffshire
- In office 1893–1900
- Preceded by: Sir Robert Duff
- Succeeded by: Alexander William Black

Personal details
- Born: 25 March 1838 Edinburgh, Scotland, United Kingdom
- Died: 25 January 1918 (aged 79) Meredith, England, United Kingdom
- Party: Liberal Party
- Other political affiliations: Co-founder of the Indian National Congress
- Relations: Wedderburn family
- Education: University of Edinburgh
- Profession: Civil servant, politician

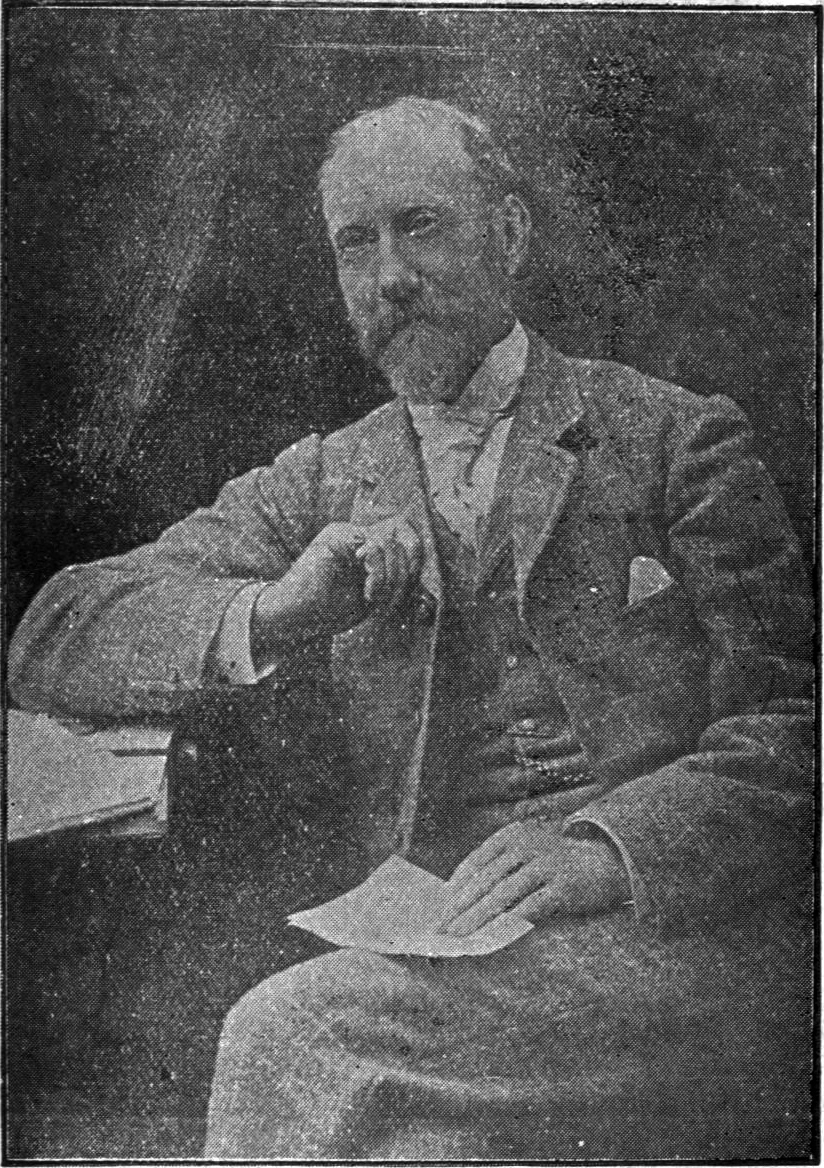
William Wedderburn

Sir William Wedderburn, 4th Baronet, JP DL (25 March 1838 – 25 January 1918) was a British civil servant and politician who was a Liberal Party member of Parliament (MP). Wedderburn was one of the founding members of the Indian National Congress. He was also the president of Congress in 1889 and 1910, for the Allahabad session.

== Early life ==
William Wedderburn was born in Edinburgh, the fourth and youngest son of Sir John Wedderburn, 2nd Baronet and Henrietta Louise Milburn. His grandfather, Sir David, had had the title of the Wedderburn baronetcy restored to the family, following the attainder after the Jacobite rising of 1745 and the subsequent regain of fortune via the slave sugar plantations of Jamaica.

William was educated at Hofwyl Workshop, then Loretto School and finally at Edinburgh University. He joined the Indian Civil Service as his father and an older brother had done. His older brother John had been killed in the 1857 uprising and William joined the service in 1860 after ranking third (of 160 applicants) in the entrance exam of 1859. His elder brother David, a widely travelled MP, was the 3rd baronet.

== Career ==
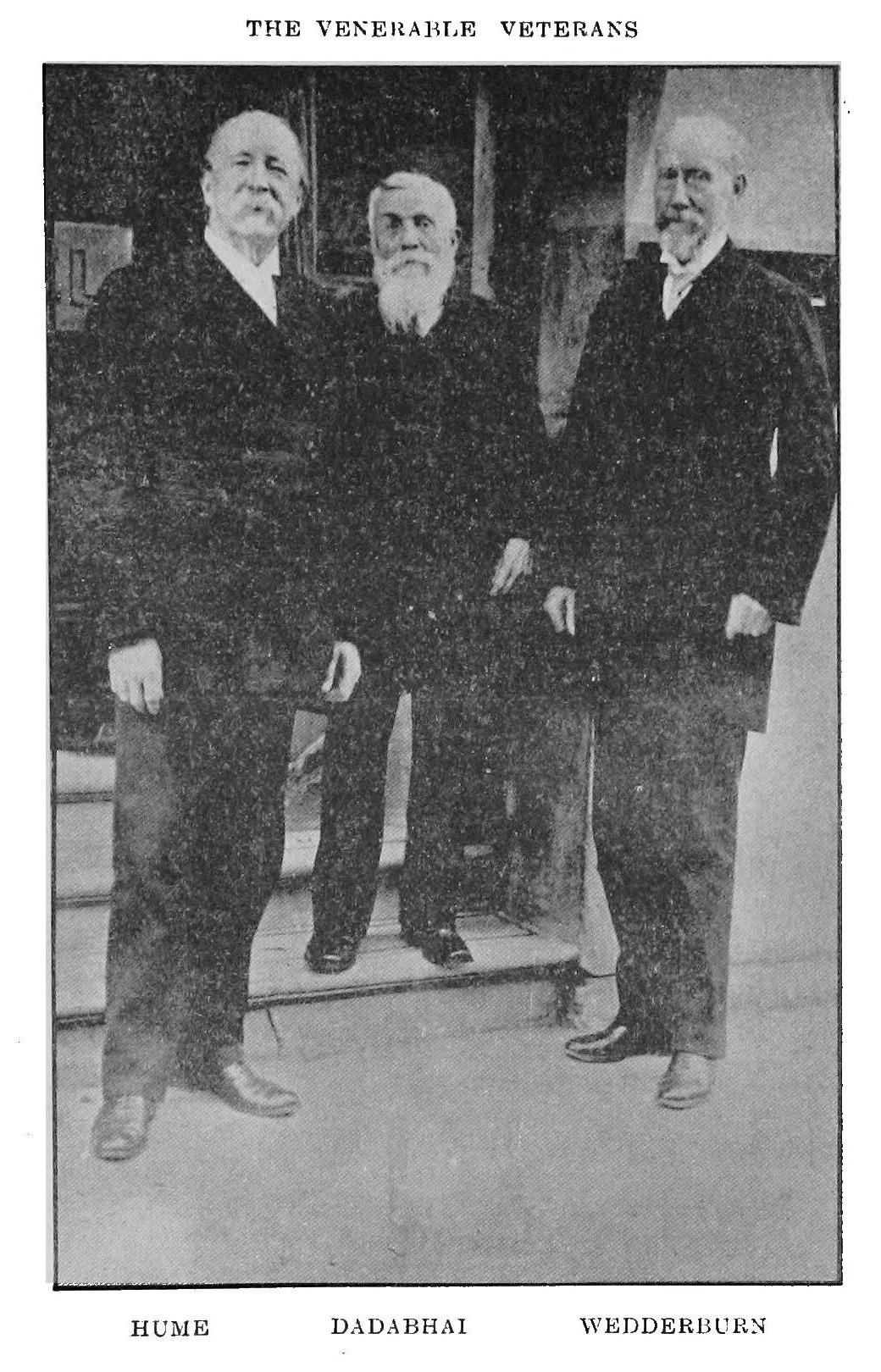
Wedderburn (right) with Hume (left) and Dadabhai Naoroji

He entered the Indian Civil Service in Bombay in 1860, served as District Judge and Judicial Commissioner in Sind; acted as secretary to Bombay Government, Judicial and Political Departments; and from 1885 acted as Judge of the High Court, Bombay. He retired when acting Chief Secretary to the Government of Bombay in 1887. During his work he noted the troubles of peasantry arising from moneylending and he suggested that co-operative agricultural banks be established to provide credits at reasonable rates. The proposal was supported in India but was blocked by the India Office. Wedderburn supported reforms suggested by Lord Ripon to develop local self-government and equality to Indian judges. He was seen as supporting the aspirations of Indians and was denied a judge position in the Bombay High Court. This led him to retire early in 1887. Along with Allan Octavian Hume he was a founder of the Indian National Congress and served as its president in 1889 and 1910. He worked along with influential Congress leaders in Bombay and in 1890 he chaired the British committee of the Indian National Congress, helped publish the journal India and attempted to support the movement through parliamentary action in Britain. He developed a close working relationship with G. K. Gokhale of the Congress. He was an unsuccessful parliamentary candidate in North Ayrshire in 1892 and served as Liberal Member of Parliament for Banffshire from 1893 to 1900.

He was a member of the Royal Commission on Indian Expenditure in 1895 and chairman of Indian Parliamentary Committee. He was considered "a great friend of the Indian Progressive Movement". In 1910 he returned to India as Congress president and tried to solve the rift between Hindus and Muslims and attempted to reconcile the differences between those who wished to work constitutionally and those who wanted to use more militant actions. He wrote a biographical memoir of A. O. Hume who died in 1912.

== Marriage and children ==
He succeeded his brother, Sir David, to the baronetcy on 18 September 1882. He married Mary Blanche Hoskyns, daughter of Henry William Hoskyns, on 12 September 1878. A daughter, Dorothy, was born in Poona in 1879 and in 1884 they had a second daughter in London, Margaret Griselda. He died at his home in Meredith, Gloucestershire on 25 January 1918. According to the local history society of the nearby village of Tibberton, the farmland of Meredith had been inherited by his mother, and his father commissioned James Medland, a locally prominent architect, to build the house in 1859.

== Publications ==
- Papers and Schemes on Arbitration Courts, Agricultural Banks, Village Panchayets and subjects relating to the condition of the Indian people
- Allan Octavian Hume, C.B.; father of the Indian National Congress, 1829 to 1912 (1912)

Parliament of the United Kingdom
Preceded by Robert Duff	Member of Parliament for Banffshire; 1893–1900	Succeeded by Alexander William Black
Baronetage of the United Kingdom
Preceded by David Wedderburn	Baronet (of Balindean, Perthshire); 1882–1918	Succeeded by John Ogilvy-Wedderburn
