= James Wedderburn-Colville =

Scottish planter (1739-1807)

- Born: 28 August 1739; Perthshire, Scotland
- Died: 14 December 1807 (aged 68); Perthshire, Scotland
- Occupation: Planter
- Father: Sir John Wedderburn
- Relatives: John Wedderburn (brother); Robert Wedderburn (son); Andrew Wedderburn Colvile (son)

James Wedderburn-Colville (1739-1807) was born James Wedderburn, the second son of Sir John Wedderburn, 5th Baronet of Blackness, an impoverished Perthshire gentleman who was executed following the Jacobite rising of 1745. Following his father's death, James travelled to Jamaica where, like his brother John Wedderburn, he made a fortune in the sugar trade. In 1773, he returned to Scotland where he married the heiress Isabella Blackburn in 1774, and purchased a country seat at Inveresk Lodge; raising a family of six children. In his later years, Wedderburn lived the life of a country gentleman (adding the extra name Colvile for reasons of inheritance) until his death in 1807.

== Biography ==
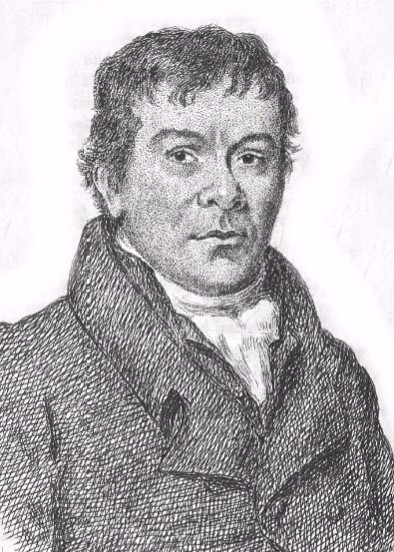
James Wedderburn's illegitimate son Robert Wedderburn, 1824

=== Early life ===
James Wedderburn was born on 28 August 1739 in Perthshire, Scotland, the second surviving son of Jean Fullerton and Sir John Wedderburn, 5th Baronet of Blackness, a Colonel in the Jacobite rising of 1745 who was captured, taken to London and executed for treason. Following this catastrophe, James and his older brother John Wedderburn travelled to Jamaica in 1747, where both brothers established themselves as "practitioners in physick and chirurgery" - despite having no medical qualification.

=== Jamaica ===
While in Jamaica, James and John purchased land and slaves, becoming wealthy in the sugar trade. James Wedderburn had children with a number of slave women. His son Robert Wedderburn later settled in England and, in 1824, wrote the anti-slavery tract The Horrors of Slavery.

=== Return to Scotland ===
James Wedderburn returned to Scotland in 1773; he married Isabella Blackburn in 1774 and bought Inveresk Lodge, Midlothian, where he lived in comfort until his death in 1807. Isabella Blackburn was the daughter of Andrew Blackburn and the Honourable Margaret Aytoun and, when she inherited the property of Craigflower in Fife, she and James Wedderburn adopted the additional surname Colvile.

At some point in the late 1700s, Robert Wedderburn visited his father at Inveresk Lodge, but the encounter was not a success. In The Horrors of Slavery, Robert Wedderburn wrote: "He [his father] called me a lazy fellow and said he would do nothing for me. From his cook I had one draught of small beer, and his footman gave me a cracked sixpence".

=== Family ===
James and Isabella had four sons and two daughters

- John Wedderburn (1776-1799)
- Andrew Wedderburn Colvile (1779-1856) who became Governor of The Hudson's Bay Company
- Peter Wedderburn Ogilvy (1781-1873)
- James Wedderburn (1782-1822)
- Margaret Wedderburn
- Jean Wedderburn (1786-1871), married Thomas Douglas, 5th Earl of Selkirk

== Death and legacy ==
Wedderburn died on 14 December 1807. In his will, dated 1802, the bulk of his estate was left in trust to his eldest legitimate son Andrew Wedderburn Colvile. He also left a small annuity of £20 to his "reputed" daughter Lydia, who had married a grocer in Musselburgh. Of his mixed-race children in Jamaica, no mention was made.

== In fiction ==
James Wedderburn features as a character in James Robertson's novel Joseph Knight (2003).
