= Sir John Wedderburn, 5th Baronet of Blackness =

Scottish landowner (1704-1746)

Sir John Wedderburn
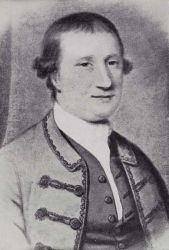
- Born: 1704; Perthshire, Scotland
- Died: 28 November 1746 (aged 41–42); Kennington Common, London
- Cause of death: Execution by hanging
- Occupation: landowner
- Known for: The "Forty Five"
- Relatives: John Wedderburn (son); James Wedderburn (son)

Sir John Wedderburn, 5th Baronet of Blackness, (1704–1746) was a Perthshire gentleman who joined the 1745 rebellion of Charles Edward Stuart. He was captured at the Battle of Culloden, taken to London, and convicted of treason. He was hanged, his estates were forfeit to the Crown, and his family was attainted. The Blackness in his title is Blackness House in Dundee rather than Blackness in Lothian just west of Edinburgh. His son John Wedderburn of Ballindean fled after his father's death to Jamaica, where he re-established the family's fortunes via slave sugar, and eventually regained his father's title.

== Early life ==
Wedderburn was the son of Alexander Wedderburn, the 4th Baronet, "who had been deposed from his office as Clerk of Dundee in 1717 for supporting the Stuarts in the previous uprising of 1715" (the Jacobite rising of 1715 in support of the Old Pretender).

John Wedderburn had a sister, Elizabeth, who married Alexander Read of Logie, Dundee in 1715; their daughter Catherine Read was a noted portrait painter and their son Alexander Read was the grandfather of "Bold" Webster, husband of Frances Annesley, and friend of Lord Byron.

Wedderburn's expectations of an inheritance were not fulfilled, and he fell on hard times. He raised his family in "a small farm with a thatched house and a clay floor, which he occupied with great industry, and thereby made a laborious but starving shift to support nine children who used to run about in the fields barefoot".

== The "Forty Five" ==
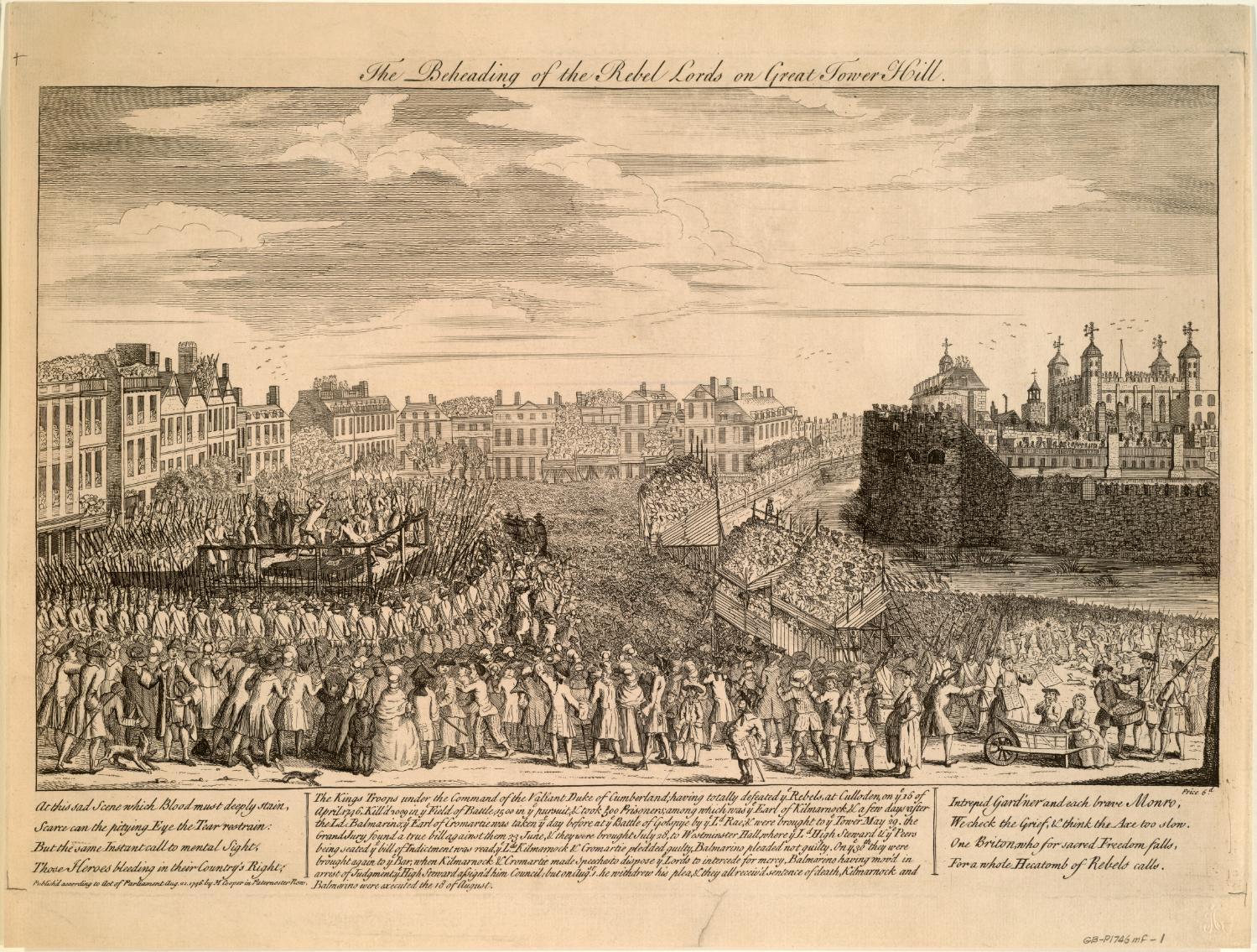
Execution of rebels following the Jacobite rebellion in 1745-1746. Published in London in 1746 by M. Cooper.

In 1745 Sir John joined the rebellion of Charles Edward Stuart against the Hanoverian Crown, serving as a colonel in the Jacobite army. He was captured at the Battle of Culloden and taken to London to face trial. He was indicted for treason at St Margaret's Hill, Southwark on 4 November 1746, and was found guilty, despite arguing in his defence that he had not personally taken up arms against the Crown. He was executed at Kennington Common on 28 November 1746.

== Marriage and descendants ==
According to the genealogist Joseph Foster, Sir John married in 1724 Jean Fullerton, who lived till 1766. Foster only records details of two sons, John and James. He also had daughters, for they are recorded as having been taken in charge by the aforementioned Catherine Read, the portrait painter, after his execution.

- John Wedderburn of Ballendean, 6th Baronet of Blackness (1729–1803), was Wedderburn's eldest son. After the failure of the '45, he made his way to London to plead with such friends as his family still had for his father's rescue and pardon. The boy's mission failed, and he had to witness his father's execution as a traitor by hanging, drawing and quartering. He returned to Scotland, but, with limited prospects there, decided to try for a new life in the New World. In Glasgow he found a ship's captain prepared to let him work his passage on a ship bound for the Caribbean. He spent many years as a planter in Jamaica, returning to Scotland a wealthy man, enriched by slave-produced sugar. He brought back with him an enslaved man named Joseph Knight, who took him to court in a freedom suit which set a precedent in Scots law. Eventually John Wedderburn climbed back up the social scale, and his daughter Louisa married General John Hope, 4th Earl of Hopetoun.
- James Wedderburn was Wedderburn's second son. He also went to Jamaica, and there apparently fathered Robert Wedderburn by one of his slaves. Following Robert's rejection by his father's family, he wrote The Horrors of Slavery, which was circulated by the abolitionist movement. A descendant of Robert was Bill Wedderburn, Baron Wedderburn of Charlton (1927-2012). James's children by his wife, Hon. Mary Louisa Eden, fifth daughter of William Eden, 1st Baron Auckland, include Andrew Colvile, governor of the Hudson's Bay Company; Jean, who married Thomas Douglas, 5th Earl of Selkirk; and James Wedderburn, Solicitor General for Scotland until his death in 1822. The other surviving son was Peter Wedderburn Ogilvy, who became a sea captain

== Notes ==
Baronetage of Nova Scotia
Preceded by Alexander Wedderburn	Baronet (of Balindean); 1744–1746	Forfeit
