= Graham Malcolm Wilson =

British physician

- Born: 16 April 1917; Cheam, Surrey (now in London Borough of Sutton)
- Died: 15 April 1977 (aged 59)
- Known for: Practice of Medicine Regius Professorship at the University of Glasgow (1967–1977)

Graham Malcolm Wilson FRCP FRCPE FRSE (1917–1977) was a Scottish physician, professor of medicine, and pioneer of clinical pharmacology.

== Life ==
He was born in Edinburgh the son of Dr Malcolm Wilson, a lecturer in mycology at the University of Edinburgh.

After education at Edinburgh Academy from 1923 to 1934, he studied medicine at the University of Edinburgh, graduating with an MB ChB in 1940, a BSc in pathology in 1947, his MD in 1950, and a DSc in 1964. After graduation in 1940 he was appointed house surgeon and house physician at the Edinburgh Royal Infirmary. He qualified MRCPE in 1942.

During the Second World War he served in the RAF Medical Services from 1941 to 1946, being sent to North Africa in 1943. In 1946 he worked at the University of Edinburgh under A. Murray Drennan, professor of pathology. Wilson was from 1947 to 1949 an assistant physician under George White Pickering at the medical unit of St Mary's Hospital. At the University of Sheffield he was from 1950 to 1951 a lecturer, from 1951 to 1954 a senior lecturer, and from 1954 to 1967 a professor of pharmacology and therapeutics. During the academic year 1952–1953 he was on sabbatical as an Eli Lilly Research Fellow at Harvard Medical School.

The period 1952–1953 was spent at Harvard with Francis Moore, developing new methods for the measurement of body electrolytes and body water. He was a prolific scientific writer.

From 1967 until his death in 1977 Wilson was regius professor of medicine at the University of Glasgow and also physician in charge of wards at the Western Infirmary.

His research interests were wide-ranging and are reflected in his numerous publications on the peripheral circulation, endocrine and metabolic problems, and the radiobiology of the thyroid gland, as well as various topics in therapeutics and medical education.

Wilson was elected FRCPE in 1947 and FRCP in 1956, In 1969 he was elected a Fellow of the Royal Society of Edinburgh. His proposers were James Norman Davidson, Robert Campbell Garry, Martin Smellie and Anthony Elliot Ritchie. In 1970 he was elected a member of the Harveian Society of Edinburgh.

He gave in 1962 the Bradshaw Lecture on Diuretics. He promoted research into the operation and efficiency of the National Health Service and created part-time medical posts specifically for women. He was chair of the editorial board of the British Journal of Clinical Pharmacology.

His influence did much to get clinical pharmacology accepted as a specialty in its own right in Britain.

He encouraged the formation of new departments of clinical pharmacology. ... Clinicians, he felt, needed to know more of the problems of industry, and industry needed better methods of assessing the safety and efficacy of drugs. With support from GD Searle Ltd he created a new post in his department for a clinician working part-time in industry and part-time in academic medicine.

His home in Glasgow was in Westbourne Gardens in the Hyndland district. He also had a holiday cottage near Loch Sunart.

He died in Glasgow of a long and painful illness on 15 April 1977 a few hours before his 60th birthday.

== Family ==
Graham Wilson's younger brother Cedric Wilson became a professor of pharmacology at Trinity College Dublin.

In 1949 in Surrey, Graham married Elizabeth Stanfield Bell Nicoll (1926–2016), who was a physician and the daughter of the physician James Thomson Bell Nicoll (1900–1955). The couple had seven children, two of whom became physicians and one that died in infancy.

== Selected publications ==
- with W. I. Baba and G. R. Tudhope: Baba, W. I.; Tudhope, G. R.; Wilson, G. M. (22 September 1962). "Triamterene, a New Diuretic Drug—I". Br Med J. 2 (5307): 756–760. doi:10.1136/bmj.2.5307.756. PMC 1926160. PMID 13863613.
- Wilson, G. M. (2 February 1963). "Diuretics". Br Med J. 1 (5326): 285–292. doi:10.1136/bmj.1.5326.285. PMC 2123735. PMID 14001022.
- wit M. Green: Green, M.; Wilson, G. M. (18 April 1964). "Thyrotoxicosis Treated by Surgery or Iodine-131. With Special Reference to Development of Hypothyroidism". Br Med J. 1 (5389): 1005–1010. doi:10.1136/bmj.1.5389.1005. PMC 1814213. PMID 14108470.
- with G. D. Broadhead and I. B. Pearson: Broadhead, G. D.; Pearson, I. B.; Wilson, G. M. (6 February 1965). "Seasonal Changes in Iodine Metabolism". Br Med J. 1 (5431): 343–348. doi:10.1136/bmj.1.5431.343. PMC 2165359. PMID 14237899.
