= David Cuthbertson =

Scottish physician, biochemist, medical researcher and nutritionist

- Born: 9 May 1900; Kilmarnock, Scotland, United Kingdom
- Died: 15 April 1989 (aged 88); Troon, Scotland, United Kingdom
- Education: Glasgow University
- Occupations: physician, biochemist, medical researcher and nutritionist
- Spouse: Jean Prentice Telfer (1928–1987)
- Children: Iain Cuthbertson
- Father: John Cuthbertson

Sir David Paton Cuthbertson, CBE, FRSE (9 May 1900 – 15 April 1989) was a Scottish physician, biochemist, medical researcher and nutritionist who was a leading authority on metabolism. The Rowett Research Institute became one of the world's leading centres for animal nutrition research under Cuthbertson's leadership (1945–65).

== Life ==
David Cuthbertson was born in Kilmarnock the son of John Cuthbertson FRSE (1859–1933) a teacher in the fields of both mining and agriculture. David was educated at Kilmarnock Academy. He served in the Royal Scots Fusiliers during the First World War. This delayed his education and he then studied medicine at Glasgow University graduating MB ChB in 1926.

Cuthbertson served on several research and scientific committees, including secondment to the Medical Research Council in 1943, and served as vice-president of the Royal Society of Edinburgh from 1959 to 1960.

In his early research, in 1936, Cuthbertson observed a loss of nitrogen (urea) in fracture patients, later referred to as surgical stress. In this he was assisted by Hamish Munro.

He was Director of the Rowett Research Institute from 1945 to 1965.

He was awarded several honorary doctorates: DSc from Rutgers University; LLD from Glasgow University; LLD from Aberdeen University; and Dhc from Zagreb University. In 1949 he was elected a Fellow of the Royal Society of Edinburgh. His proposers were James Norman Davidson, Robert Garry, Ernest Cruickshank, and Donald McArthur. He served as the Society's vice president from 1959 to 1960.

He died on 15 April 1989, in Troon in Ayrshire.

== Family ==
He married Jean Prentice Telfer in Arrochar on 7 September 1928; she died on 28 May 1987 in Troon. Jean and David are buried together at Arrochar Churchyard. Their son was the actor Iain Cuthbertson (1930–2009).
