= Anthony Elliot Ritchie =

Scottish physiologist and educator (1915–1997)

Anthony Elliot Ritchie FRSE FRCPE LLD (30 March 1915 – 14 September 1997) was a Scottish physiologist who was a professor at the University of St Andrews.

== Life ==
Ritchie was born at 20 Upper Gray Street, Edinburgh on 30 March 1915, the only son of Jessie Jane Elliot and James Ritchie FRSE. He was schooled at Edinburgh Academy from 1922 to 1930.

He studied science at the University of Aberdeen graduating with an MA in 1933 and a BSc in 1936. He then studied medicine at the University of Edinburgh graduating with an MB ChB in 1940. He served in the Royal Army Medical Corps during the Second World War 1942 to 1945, attached to the Territorial Army. This role was both part-time and Edinburgh-based, allowing him to continue other academic pursuits. He was a Carnegie Research Scholar 1940-41 and from 1942 began lecturing in Physiology at the University of Edinburgh, being promoted to senior lecturer in 1946.

In 1948 the University of St Andrews gave him a professorship, where he continued until 1969.

In 1951 he was elected a member of the Harveian Society of Edinburgh. In 1951 he was also elected a Fellow of the Royal Society of Edinburgh. His proposers were Norman Davidson, Robert Garry, Ernest Cruickshank, and Sir James Learmonth. He served as Secretary to the Society 1960 to 1965 and was twice Vice President: 1965-66 and 1976–79, being General Secretary in between. He won the Society's Bicentenary Medal in 1983.

In 1969 he became Secretary and Treasurer to the Carnegie Trust for the Universities of Scotland. He was also a Director of the Royal Observatory Trust. In 1972 he received an honorary doctorate (DSc) from the University of St Andrews and the University of Strathclyde awarded him an honorary doctorate (LLD) in 1985.

He retired in 1986 and died in Edinburgh on 14 September 1997.

== Family ==
In 1941 he married Elizabeth Lambie Knox, and they together had three daughters and one son.

== Publications ==
- Clinical Electromyography (1977) with J. A. R. Lenman
