= Loch na Bairness =

Lake in Highland, Scotland

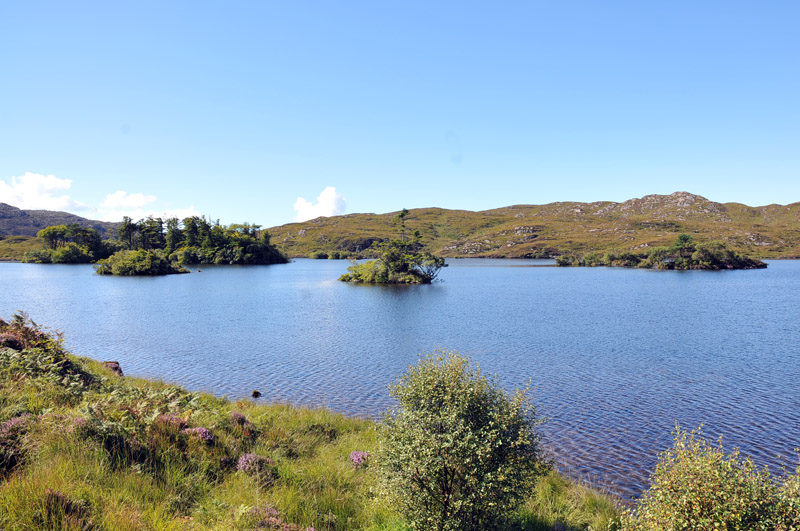
- Loch na Bairness from its eastern shore

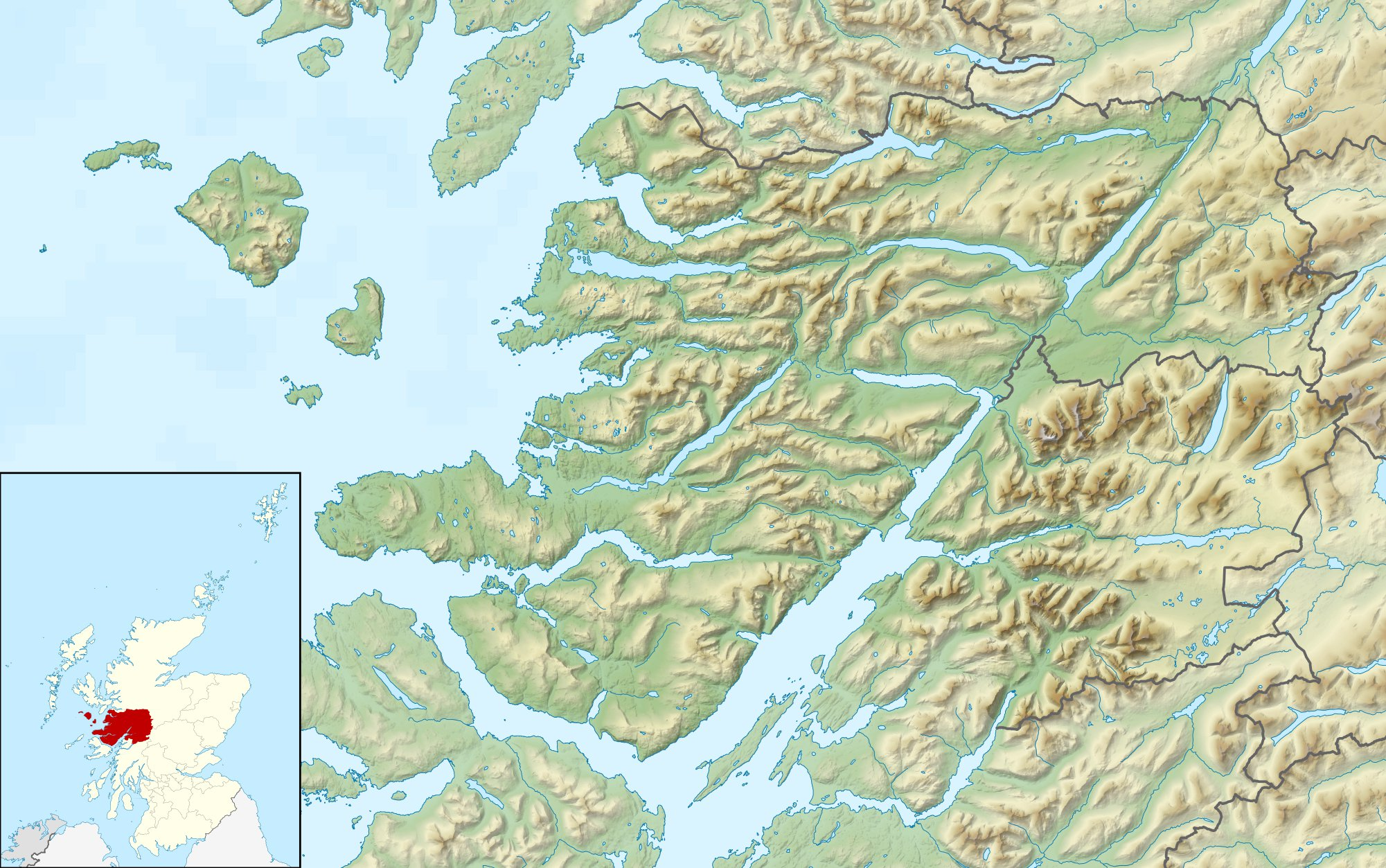
- Location within Lochaber
- Location: Scottish Highlands
- Coordinates: 56°48′54.7″N 5°50′30.5″W
- Primary inflows: An Dubh Lochan
- Primary outflows: Allt Ruadh
- Basin countries: Scotland, United Kingdom
- Max. length: 577 m (1,893 ft)
- Max. width: 457 m (1,499 ft)
- Surface elevation: 116 m (381 ft)
- Islands: 22

Loch na Bairness is a loch in Moidart, Scotland, roughly 1.8 km southwest of the village of Glenuig.

The loch shares its name with the hill on its northeast shore, Cruach na Bairness. Both likely derive from the Scottish Gaelic barr ("top") + easa ("waterfall") i.e., "Loch of the Top of the Waterfall".

Loch na Bairness sits on a bedrock of psammite. A vein of microdiorite runs along its south shore.

The loch has a large stock of brown trout for fishing.
