= Jemima Blackburn =

Scottish painter (1823 – 1909)

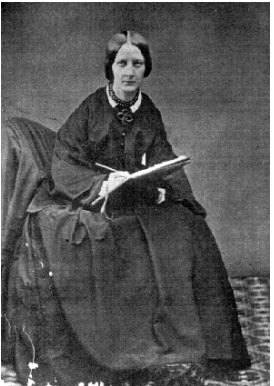
- Photograph by Alinari of Florence (1852)
- Born: 1 May 1823; Edinburgh, Scotland
- Died: 9 August 1909 (aged 86); Roshven, Moidart, Scotland
- Known for: Painting
- Notable work: Birds from Moidart, Birds from Nature
- Spouse: Hugh Blackburn (m. 1849) in Edinburgh
- Father: James Wedderburn

Jemima Wedderburn Blackburn (1 May 1823 – 9 August 1909) was a Scottish painter whose work illustrated rural life in 19th-century Scotland. One of the most popular illustrators in Victorian Britain, she illustrated 27 books. Her greatest ornithological achievement was the second edition of her Birds from Nature (1868). Most of the illustrations were watercolours, with early paintings often including some ink work. A few were collages in which she cut out a bird's outline and transferred it to a different background, in a similar manner to John James Audubon. Her many watercolours showed daily family life in the late 19th-century Scottish Highlands as well as fantasy scenes from children's fables. She achieved widespread recognition under the initials JB or her married name Mrs. Hugh Blackburn.

== Early life and family connections ==
Blackburn was born at 31 Heriot Row in Edinburgh. She was the youngest child of James Wedderburn, Solicitor General for Scotland, who died some months before her birth, and Isabella Clerk, whose family were holders of the baronetcy of Clerk of Penicuik. Her paternal relatives, connected through the Wedderburn baronets, included her great-grandfather Sir John Wedderburn, 5th Baronet of Blackness, executed for his involvement with the Jacobite rising of 1745. The family was attainted and so several of the next generation went to Jamaica, where they grew rich from owning slave plantations. Two of these sons were John Wedderburn of Ballendean, who eventually reclaimed the family title, and James, Jemima's grandfather. The former had a case brought against him under Scots law by former slave Joseph Knight. The latter fathered Robert Wedderburn, the radical preacher, whom he did not acknowledge; Andrew Colville, governor of the Hudson's Bay Company; Jean, who married Thomas Douglas, 5th Earl of Selkirk; and James, the judge, who was Jemima's father.

On her mother's side, Jemima was the first cousin of James Clerk Maxwell, who lived with her family in Edinburgh when he was a schoolboy and she a young woman; she encouraged him to learn to draw.

Jemima was a friend and pupil of John Ruskin and Sir Edwin Landseer, both of whom praised her work highly. She married mathematician Hugh Blackburn, and they bought the Roshven estate in 1854. This home became the focus of visits from some of the most celebrated figures of the century, including the Duke of Argyll, Lord Kelvin, Lord Lister, Hermann von Helmholtz, Sir John Everett Millais, Anthony Trollope and Benjamin Disraeli.

== Work and legacy ==
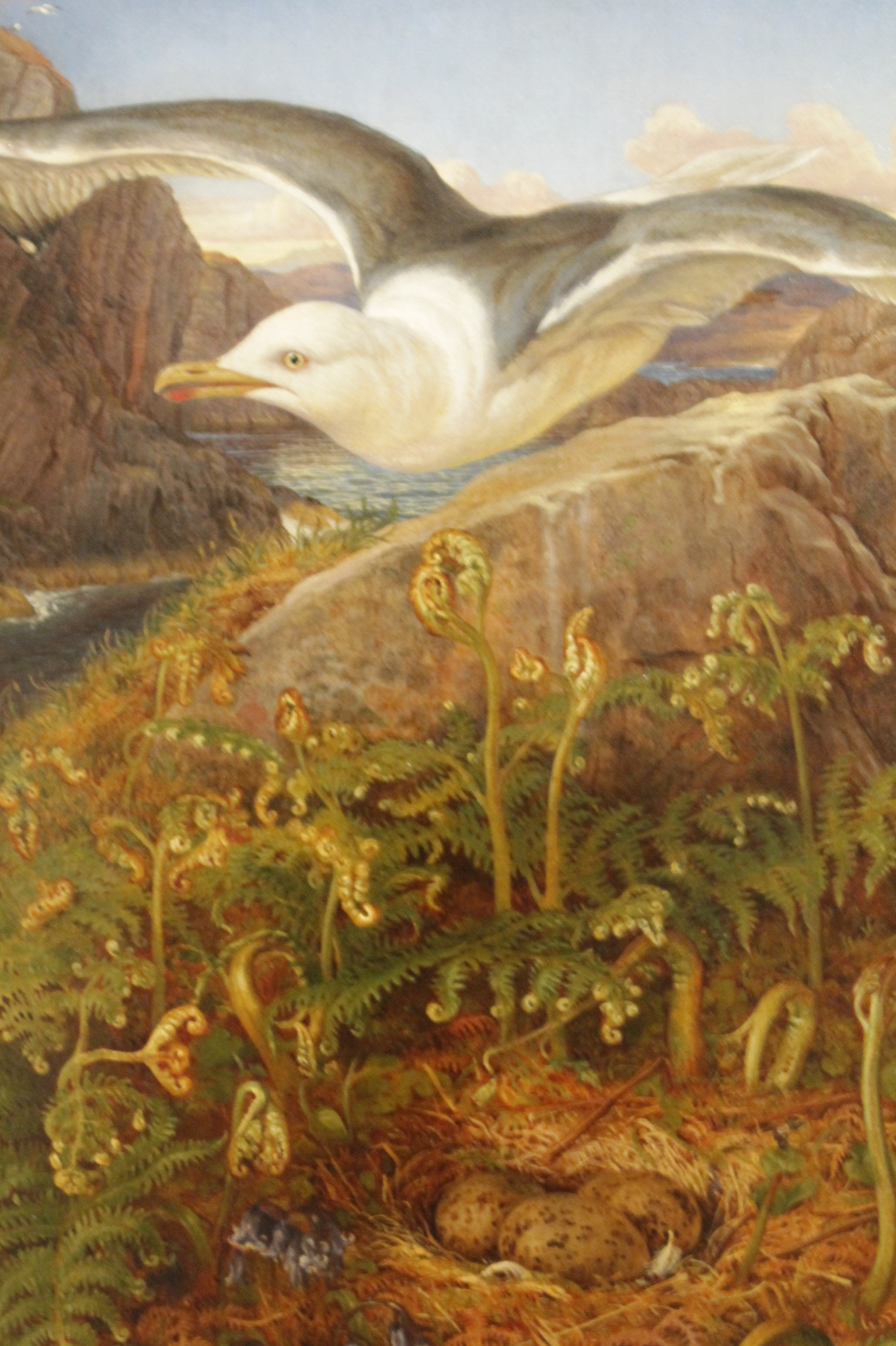
Seagull's Nest in Eilean na Gove, Moidart by Jemima Blackburn (detail) (1857)

Much of her work portrayed Roshven, its animals and birds. She became one of the leading bird painters of the day. "...in portraying animals, I have nothing to teach her..." - Sir Edwin Landseer, 1843

Jemima Blackburn was a keen observer of bird behaviour, as evidenced by her writings. She describes the ejection of nestling meadow pipits (Anthus pratensis) by a blind and naked hatchling common cuckoo (Cuculus canorus), accompanied by a small drawing. This behaviour had been reported by Edward Jenner in 1788 but dismissed as impossible by Charles Waterton in 1836. Blackburn's account was originally published in a popular narrative for children, The Pipits in 1871. Charles Darwin refers to Blackburn's observations in the sixth edition of On the Origin of Species.

Blackburn illustrated 27 books. A lost oil painting, "Plough Horse Startled by a Railway Engine", was exhibited at the Royal Academy in 1849 and at the first exhibition of the Society of Female Artists in London in 1857. In the same year, she was asked to contribute to the first exhibition of contemporary British art in America. Her works have been exhibited in Edinburgh, Glasgow and London and examples have been acquired by the British Museum, the British Library, the Natural History Museum, Royal Collection, the National Portrait Gallery, the Scottish National Portrait Gallery and the James Clerk Maxwell Foundation.

In 1868 Blackburn published Birds drawn from Nature, which won immediate public acclaim. A copy, hand coloured under Blackburn's own supervision, was presented to the Zoological Society of London. "...We have seen no such birds since Bewick's. We say this not ignorant of the magnificent plates by Selby, Audubon, Wilson and Gould..." - The Scotsman, 1868

Beatrix Potter, famous for her own illustrations of wild and domestic animals, was a fan of Blackburn from childhood. Potter recalls her delight when given a copy of Blackburn's Birds drawn from Nature on her tenth birthday. As an adult, Potter assessed her as a "broad intelligent observer with a keen eye for the beautiful in Nature", commenting: "I consider that Mrs Blackburn's birds do not on the average stand on their legs so well as Bewick's, but he is her only possible rival". The two women met in 1894, when Blackburn was visiting Putney Park, near London, the home of a cousin of Potter's. Potter found her an extraordinarily interesting woman. "I have not been so much struck by anyone for a long time."

It is quite likely that Blackburn's work for "The Cat's Pilgrimage" (1870) and other works influenced Potter's 1894 illustrations for "Little Red Riding Hood". The botanist Mary Noble argues that Potter modelled Jemima Puddle-duck, at least in name if not ornithological behaviour, on Jemima Blackburn. Blackburn died barely a year after Potter published her Tale of Jemima Puddle-duck to great success.

== Ornithological illustrations ==
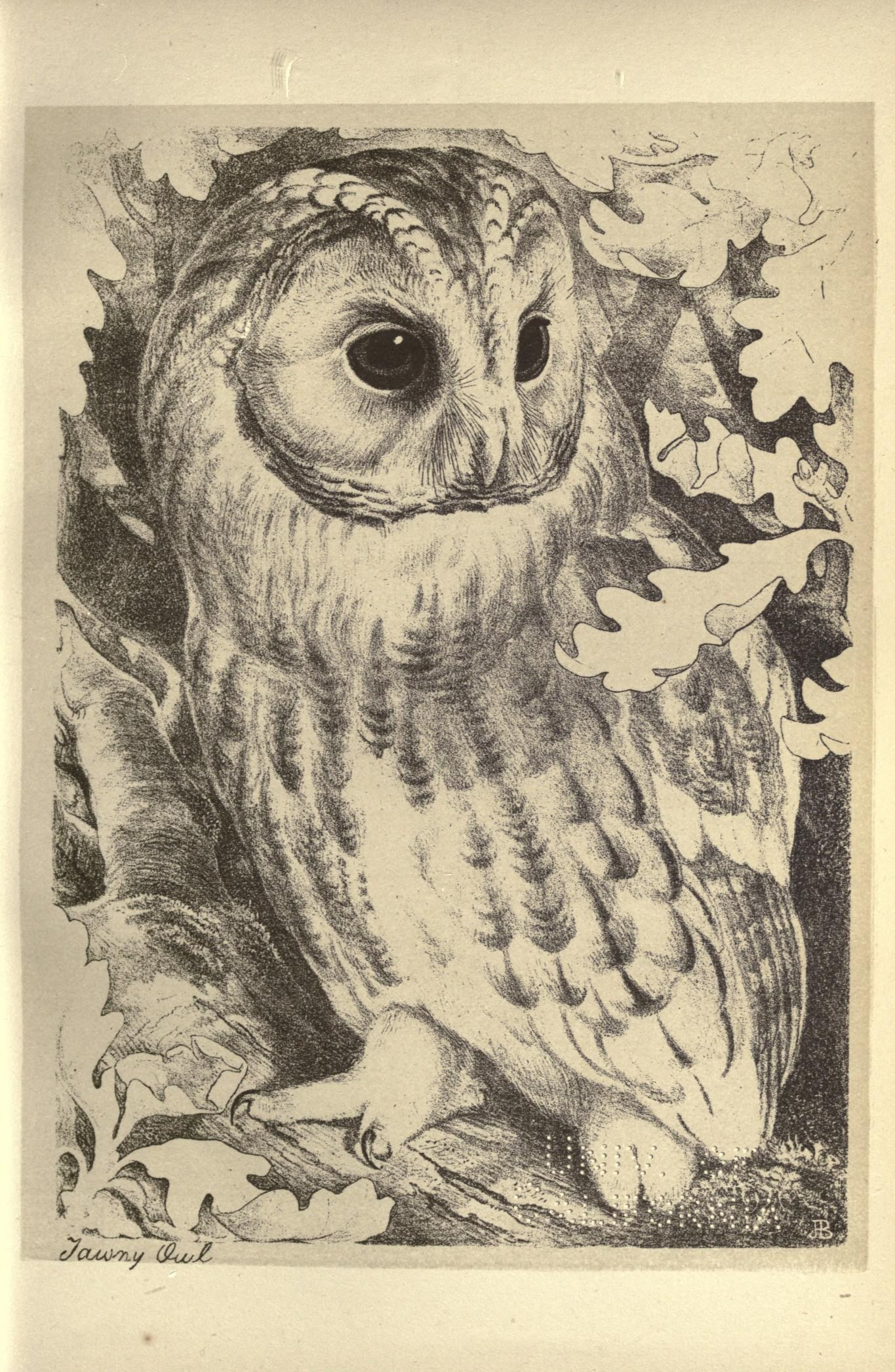
'Tawny owl,' from plate 12 of Birds from Moidart and elsewhere (1895)

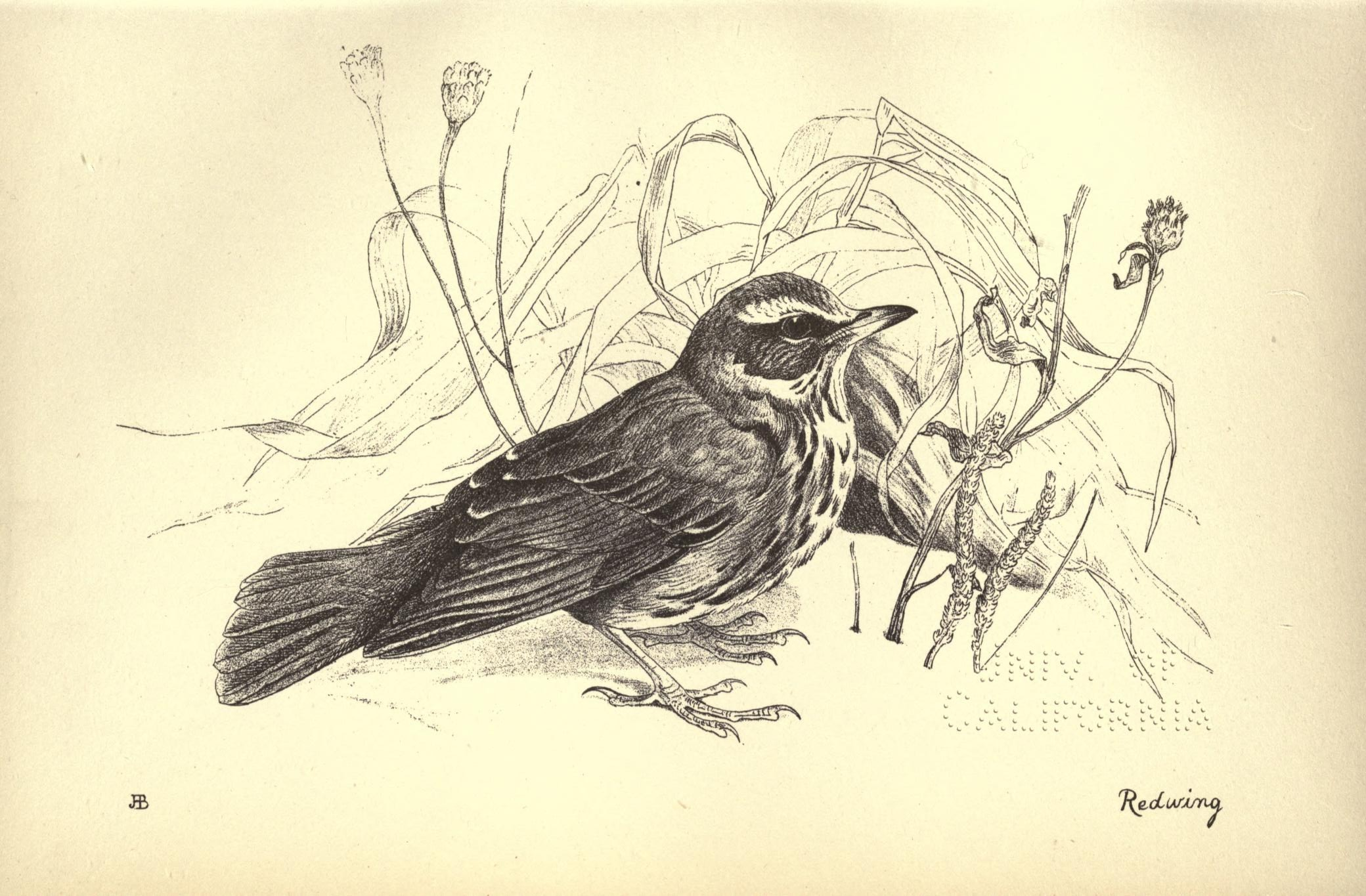
'Redwing,' from plate 19 of Birds from Moidart and elsewhere (1895)

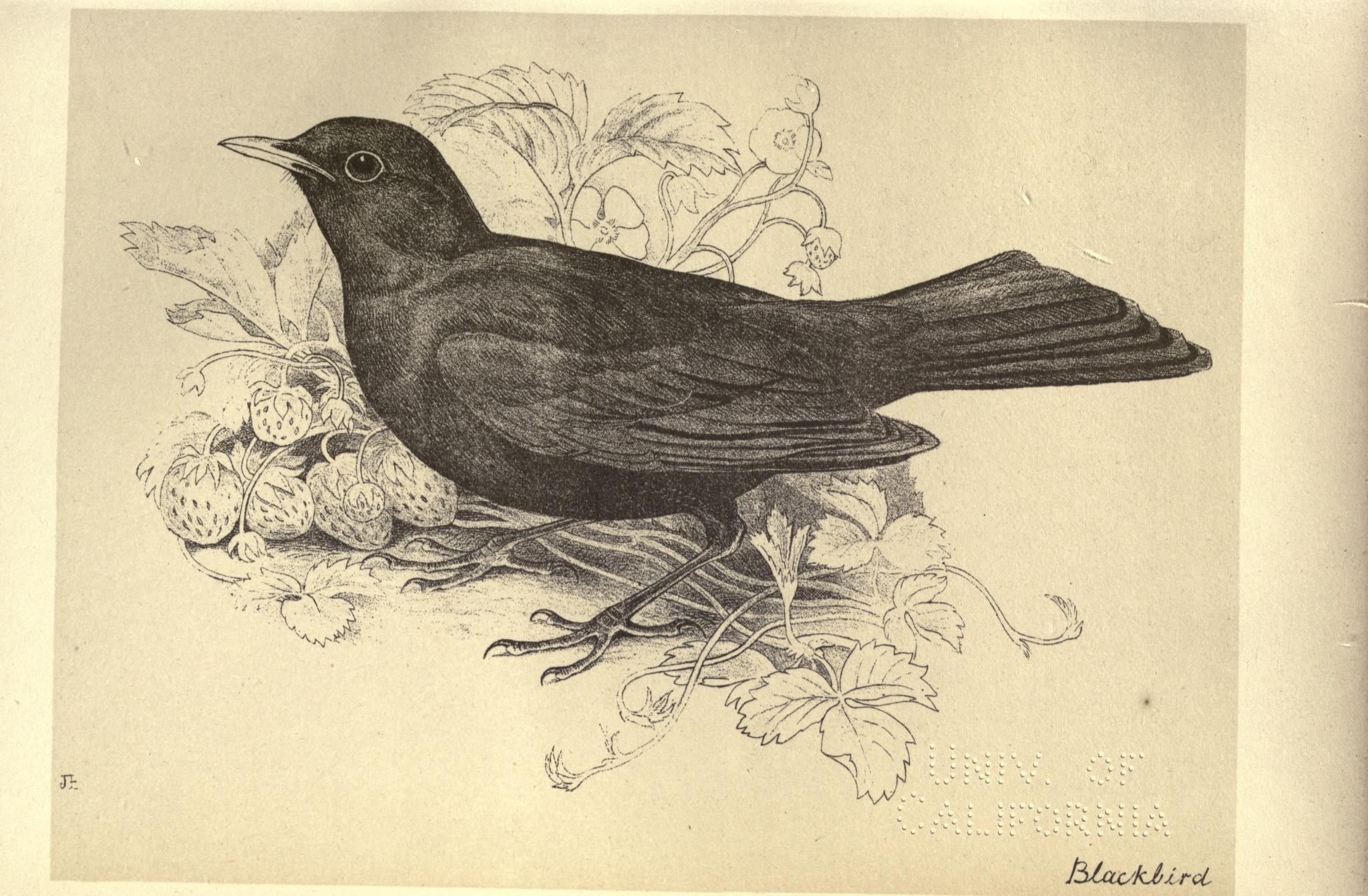
'Blackbird,' from plate 20 of Birds from Moidart and elsewhere (1895)

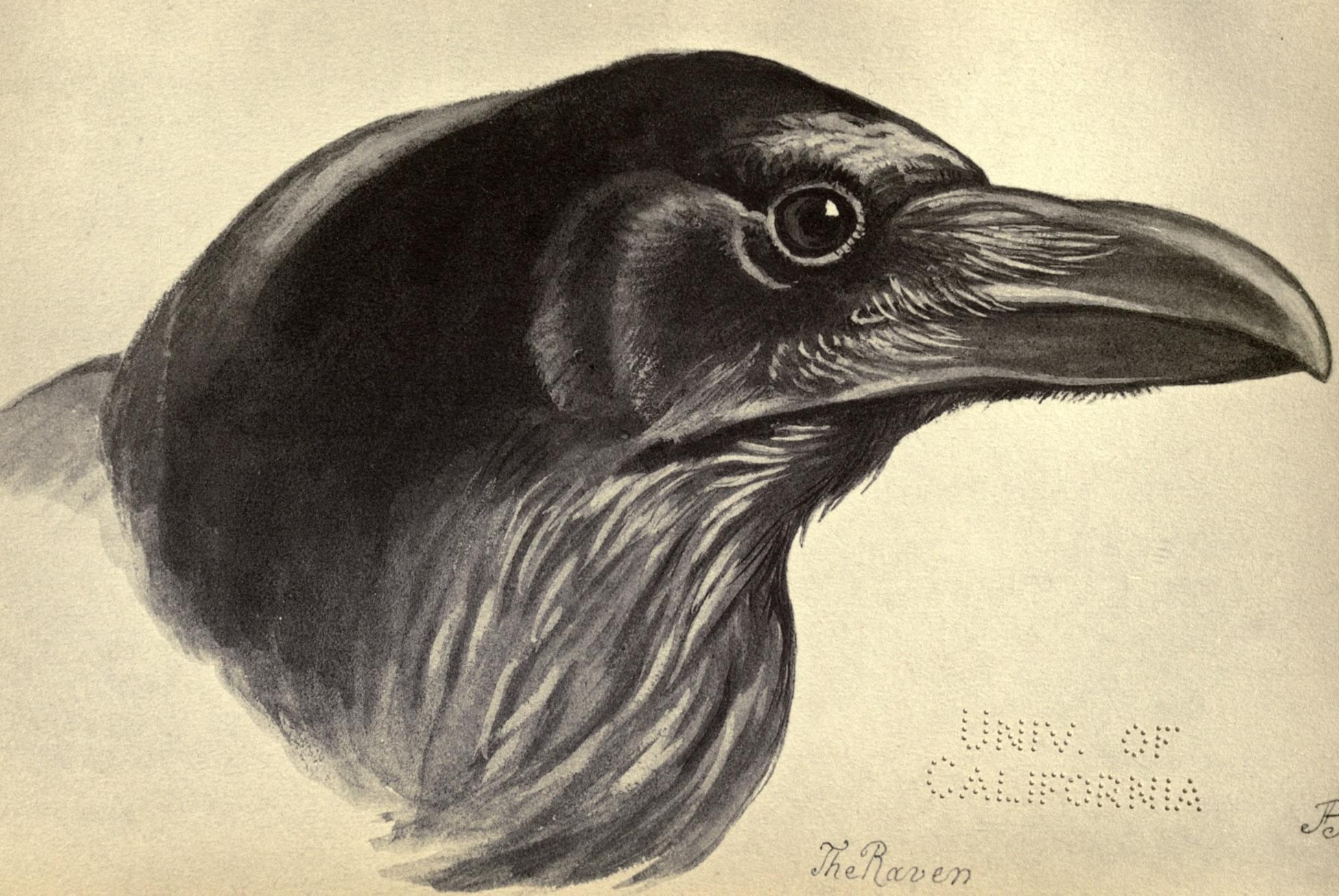
'The raven,' from plate 47 of Birds from Moidart and elsewhere (1895)

== Modern reprints of her work ==
Blackburn, Jemima; Fairley, Rob (1993). Blackburn's birds. Canongate. ISBN 9780862414368.
