= George Wishart (disambiguation) =

George Wishart (c.1513–1546) was a Scottish Protestant reformer and martyr.

George Wishart may also refer to:

- George Wishart (bishop) (1599–1671), Scottish Anglican bishop and author
- George Wishart (moderator) (1703–1785), Scottish minister
- George M. Wishart (1895–1958), Scottish physiologist
- George Wishart of Drymme, Scottish landowner, lawyer, and financial administrator for Mary, Queen of Scots

== See also ==
- George Wishart Anderson (1913–2002), British theologian
