= James Black (pharmacologist) =

Scottish doctor and pharmacologist (1924–2010)

Sir James Black OM FRS FRSE FRCP
- Born: James Whyte Black; 14 June 1924; Uddingston, Lanarkshire, Scotland
- Died: 22 March 2010 (aged 85); London, England
- Citizenship: United Kingdom
- Education: University of St Andrews
- Known for: Work towards the use of propranolol and cimetidine
- Awards: Lasker Award (1976); FRS (1976); Mullard Award (1978); Artois-Baillet Latour Health Prize (1979); Cameron Prize for Therapeutics of the University of Edinburgh (1980); Wolf Prize in Medicine (1982); Nobel Prize for Medicine (1988); Royal Medal (2004)
- Scientific career
- Fields: Pharmacology
- Workplaces: University of Malaya; University of Glasgow; ICI Pharmaceuticals; University College London; University of St Andrews; University of Dundee; King's College London
- Website: www.nobelprize.org/nobel_prizes/medicine/laureates/1988/black-bio.html

Sir James Whyte Black born (14 June 1924 – Died 22 March 2010) was a Scottish physician and pharmacologist. Together with Gertrude B. Elion and George H. Hitchings, he shared the Nobel Prize for Medicine in 1988 for pioneering strategies for rational drug-design, which, in his case, led to the development of propranolol and cimetidine. Black established a Veterinary Physiology department at the University of Glasgow, where he became interested in the effects of adrenaline on the human heart. He went to work for ICI Pharmaceuticals in 1958 and, while there, developed propranolol, a beta blocker used for the treatment of heart disease. Black was also responsible for the development of cimetidine, an H2 receptor antagonist, a drug used to treat stomach ulcers.

== Early life and education ==
Black was born on 14 June 1924 in Uddingston, Lanarkshire, the fourth of five sons of a Baptist family which traced its origins to Balquhidder, Perthshire. His father Walter Black was a mining engineer and his mother was Catherine Reid Whyte. He was brought up in Fife, educated at Beath High School, Cowdenbeath, and, at the age of 15, won a scholarship to the University of St Andrews. His family had been too poor to send him to university and he had been persuaded to sit the St Andrews entrance exam by his maths teacher at Beath.

Until 1967, University College, Dundee was the site for all clinical medical activity for the University of St Andrews. He matriculated at University College (which eventually became the University of Dundee) in 1943 and graduated from University of St Andrews School of Medicine with an MB ChB in 1946.

After graduating, he stayed at University College to join the physiology department as an assistant lecturer before taking a lecturer position at King Edward VII College of Medicine in Singapore that later became part of the University of Malaya. Black had decided against a career as a medical practitioner as he objected to what he considered the insensitive treatment of patients at the time.

== Career ==
Black had large debts upon his graduation from university, so he took a teaching job in Singapore for three years, before moving to London in 1950 and then on to join the University of Glasgow (Veterinary School) where he established the Veterinary Physiology Department and developed an interest in the way adrenaline affects the human heart, particularly in those suffering from angina. Having formulated a theory of an approach by which the effects of adrenaline might be annulled, he joined ICI Pharmaceuticals in 1958, remaining with the company until 1964, during which time he invented propranolol, which later became the world's best-selling drug. During this time Black pioneered a method of research whereby drug molecules were purposefully built instead of being synthesised first and then investigated for their potential medical uses. The discovery of propranolol was hailed as the greatest breakthrough in the treatment of heart disease since the discovery of digitalis.

At the same time, Black was developing a similar method of inventing drugs for treatment of stomach ulcers, but ICI did not wish to pursue the idea so Black resigned in 1964 and joined Smith, Kline and French where he worked for nine years until 1973. While there, Black developed his second major drug, cimetidine, which was launched under the brand name Tagamet in 1975 and soon outsold propranolol to become the world's largest-selling prescription drug.

Black was appointed professor, and head of department, of pharmacology at University College London in 1973 where he established a new undergraduate course in medicinal chemistry but he became frustrated by the lack of funding for research and accepted the post of director of therapeutic research at the Wellcome Research Laboratories in 1978. However he did not agree with his immediate boss there, Sir John Vane, and resigned in 1984. Black then became Professor of Analytical Pharmacology at the Rayne Institute of King's College London medical school, where he remained until 1992. He established the James Black Foundation in 1988 with funding from Johnson & Johnson and led a team of 25 scientists in drugs research, including work on gastrin inhibitors which can prevent some stomach cancers.

Black contributed to basic scientific and clinical knowledge in cardiology, both as a physician and as a basic scientist. His invention of propranolol, the beta adrenergic receptor antagonist that revolutionised the medical management of angina pectoris, is considered to be one of the most important contributions to clinical medicine and pharmacology of the 20th century. Propranolol has been described as the greatest breakthrough in heart disease treatments since the 18th century discovery of digitalis and has benefited millions of people. Black's method of research, his discoveries about adrenergic pharmacology, and his clarification of the mechanisms of cardiac action are all strengths of his work.

He was greatly involved in the synthesis of cimetidine, at the time a revolutionary drug for the treatment and prevention of peptic ulcers. Cimetidine was the first of a new class of drugs, the H_{2}-receptor antagonists.

=== Chancellor of the University of Dundee ===
In 1980, Black's association with the University of Dundee was renewed when the institution recognised his many achievements by conferring him with the Honorary Degree of Doctor of Laws. In 1992 he accepted an offer to succeed the 16th Earl of Dalhousie as chancellor of the university and was installed as chancellor at the award ceremony held in Dundee Repertory Theatre on 29 April 1992. Appropriately the first degree he conferred was to Professor Robert Campbell Garry, who had been responsible for his original appointment at University College Dundee. Sir James remarked at this ceremony that by returning to Dundee he was "in a real sense, coming home".

As Chancellor, Sir James Black did much to promote the University of Dundee and was a popular figure within the university. He was awarded a second honorary degree, that of Doctor of Science, in 2005. He retired from his post the following year, and his association with the University of Dundee was marked with launching of the £20 million Sir James Black Centre. The centre, intended to promote interdisciplinary research in the life sciences, was opened by Sydney Brenner in 2006. Sir James Black himself visited the centre in October 2006 and was reportedly excited and pleased by what he saw.

A portrait of Black in his chancellor's robes, by Helene Train, is held as part of the university's fine art collection. The portrait is currently displayed in the foyer of the Sir James Black Centre.

== Honours and awards ==
Black was made a Knight Bachelor on 10 February 1981 for services to medical research, receiving the honour from the Queen at Buckingham Palace. On 26 May 2000, he was appointed to the Order of Merit, of which there are only 24 members at any one time, by Queen Elizabeth II.

Black was elected a Fellow of the Royal Society (FRS) in 1976 and the same year he was awarded the Lasker award. His certificate of election to the Royal Society reads:

Has made outstanding contributions, based on fundamental considerations of receptor theory, to the development of new drugs of clinical importance. Introduced the first effective beta blockers and analysed their cardiovascular effects. These drugs have opened up new perspectives for the treatment of angina pectoris, cardiac irregularities and hypertension. More recently, in a concerted drive carried out with great vision, he has developed a new type of histamine antagonist capable of inhibiting gastric acid secretion induced by histamine or pentagastrin. Apart from its practical implications this work has considerable fundamental importance since it provided evidence for the existence of a new type of histamine receptor. This work has also provided experimental support for the hypothesis that endogenous histamine may be involved in the secretion of acid in the stomach.

In 1979, he was awarded the Artois-Baillet Latour Health Prize. Black was awarded the Cameron Prize for Therapeutics of the University of Edinburgh in 1980. In 1982 Black was awarded the Wolf Prize in Medicine, and the year after the Scheele Award. He was awarded the 1988 Nobel Prize in Medicine along with Gertrude B. Elion and George H. Hitchings for their work on drug development. Black's Nobel Prize medal was donated to the National Museum of Scotland in 2009.

In 1994, he received the Ellison-Cliffe Medal from the Royal Society of Medicine and in 2004 the Royal Medal from the Royal Society. In 2008, he was Awarded a Lifetime Achievement Award at the Medical Futures Innovation Awards, accompanied by his wife Professor Rona Mackie Black, in front of a distinguished audience of one thousand guests.

In the town of Lochgelly, Fife, there is a street called Sir James Black Gait.

On 23 November 2018, the University of Glasgow renamed the West Medical Building in honour of Black. Professor Sir Anton Muscatelli, principal and vice-chancellor of the University of Glasgow, said: “Sir James was undoubtedly one of the greatest scientists of the modern age. Through his commitment, intellect and insight he achieved a global impact and his discoveries continue to improve the lives of many.” The unveiling of a plaque was attended by Sir James Black’s wife, Professor Rona Mackie Black, emeritus professor and senior research fellow in public health within the university's Institute of Health and Wellbeing.

James Black Place at Ninewells Hospital is named in his honour.

== Personal life ==
Black met Hilary Joan Vaughan (1924–1986) at a university ball in 1944 and the couple married in 1946 upon his graduation. He described her as the "mainspring" of his life until she died aged 61 in Surrey. The couple had a daughter, Stephanie, born in 1951. Black remarried in 1994, to Professor Rona MacKie. Black was a very private man who was averse to publicity and was horrified to discover he had won the Nobel Prize.

Black died, aged 85, on the morning of 22 March 2010, after a long illness. His death was announced by the University of Dundee, where Black served as Chancellor from 1992 to 2006. His funeral was held on 29 March at St. Columba's Church, London. He is buried at the Ardclach cemetery, a parish established in 1655, near Nairn, Scotland. Upon hearing of Black's death, Professor Pete Downes, Principal and Vice-Chancellor of the University of Dundee said Black "was a great scientist, but he was also a great man to know" while the BBC said he was "hailed as one of the great Scottish scientists of the 20th Century". He was described by The Daily Telegraph as the man who earned the most for the pharmaceutical industry through his drug development, though he received little personal financial gain from his work.

Shortly after his death the Bute Medical School of the University of St Andrews, where Black had studied for his initial degree in medicine, announced that an honorary 'Sir James Black Chair of Medicine' would be created. In September 2010 the first chair of medicine at the university was given to Professor Stephen H Gillespie MD, DSc, FRCP (Edin), FRC Path, who left his post as professor of medical microbiology at UCL.

Academic offices
Preceded by Earl of Dalhousie	Chancellor of the University of Dundee; 1992–2006	Succeeded by Baron Patel
