= Hamish Munro =

Scottish biochemist

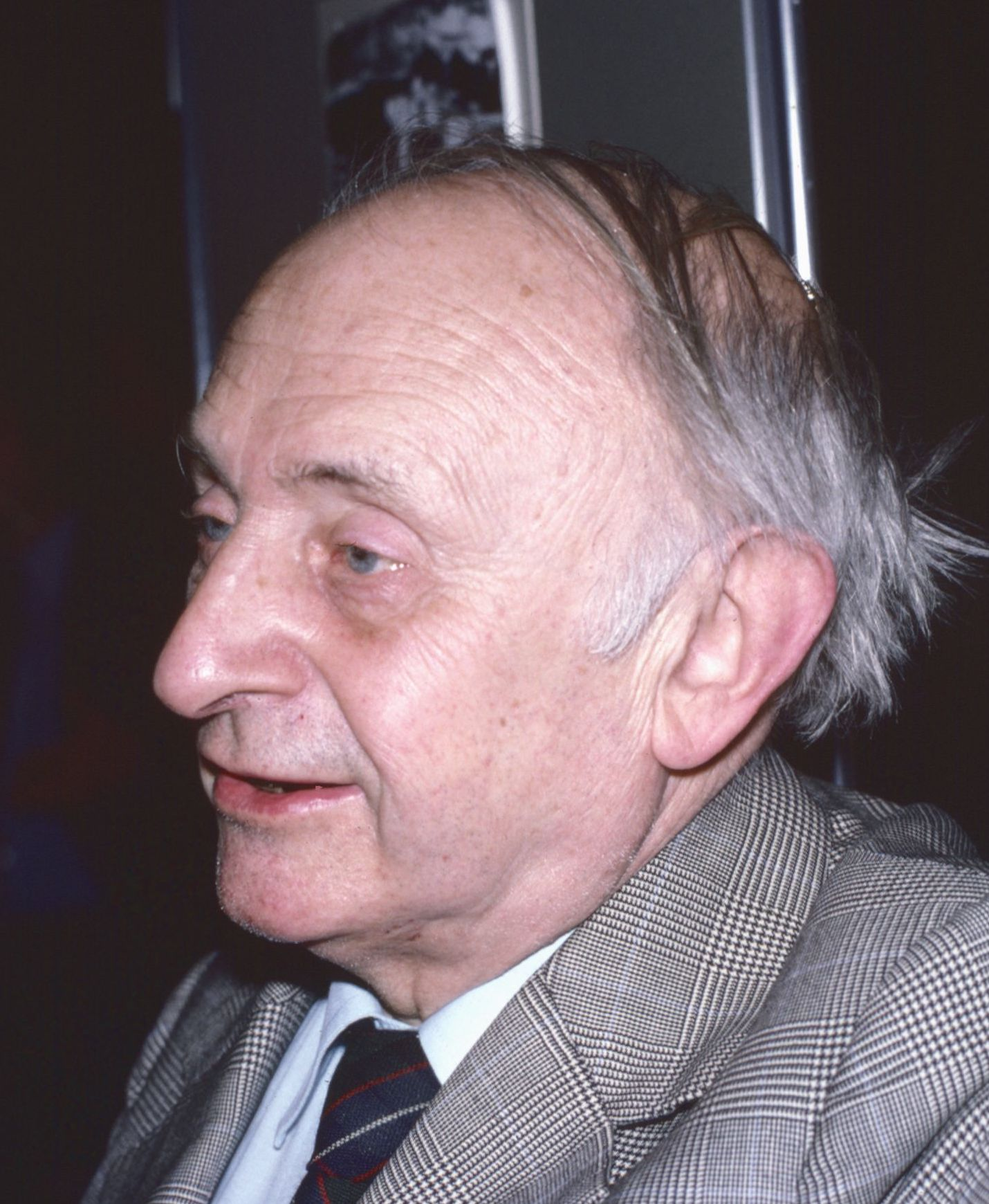
Hamish Nisbet Munro

Hamish Nisbet Munro FRSE (1915–1994) was a Scottish biochemist and expert in protein metabolism at Glasgow University and Massachusetts Institute of Technology. He served as president of the American Institute of Nutrition in 1978, and was first director of the USDA Human Nutrition Research Centre on Ageing at Tufts University.

== Life ==
Munro was born in Edinburgh on 3 July 1915, the son of a bank clerk. He was educated first at George Watson's College. However, in 1923 his father was transferred to manage the Bank of Scotland branch in the small village of Bonar Bridge in Sutherland, close to his family home in Dornoch. Hamish was then educated in the one-room village school. In 1932 he was Dux (top pupil) of the county of Sutherland. Wishing to study medicine but needing qualifications which could not be provided in his village school he crammed physics and chemistry alone and passed the university entrance examination, but as medicine was oversubscribed, he first studied for a Bachelor of Science degree at Glasgow University. During this course he spent the summers with Edward Provan Cathcart and David Cuthbertson and acquired an interest in metabolism and nutrition. He graduated BSc in 1936 with First Class Honours, publishing that year the first of over 700 scientific papers. He returned to the medical course and qualified MB ChB in September 1939.

He began as a medical resident at the Victoria Infirmary in Glasgow, and was promoted to clinical tutor the following year, a role he held for the duration of the Second World War. In 1945 he left clinical work for a lecturership in physiology at Glasgow University, transferring as senior lecturer to the newly separate Department of Biochemistry in 1947. The head of the department was James Norman Davidson, but Munro established his own reputation in studies of protein metabolism and nucleic acids, receiving a doctorate (DSc) in 1956, and being appointed full professor in 1964.[2] In 1956 he was elected a Fellow of the Royal Society of Edinburgh, proposed by Davidson, Cuthbertson, Robert Campbell Garry, and Hugh Garven. During this time, he completed the first two volumes of his major work, Mammalian Protein Metabolism, with J.D. Allison.

In 1966 he moved to Boston in America as professor of physiological chemistry at MIT. In this laboratory he continued his studies of protein metabolism, including his major interest in ferritin, but also important studies in RNA polymerases, and methylated histidine as a measure of muscle breakdown. In 1972 he was offered, but declined, directorship of the Dunn Nutrition Centre in Cambridge.[4] From 1977 he joined a US Department of Agriculture task force which led to the construction of the USDA Human Nutrition Research Centre on Ageing at Tufts University, a 15-storey building in downtown Boston. Munro was its first director from 1982, also serving as Professor of Medicine at Tufts.

He received many awards, including the Osborne-Mendel Award (1969) and the Borden Award (1978) from the American Institute of Nutrition, the Bristol-Myers Award for Distinguished Achievements in Nutrition (1981), the Rank Prize for Nutrition (1982) and the Corson Medal, Franklin Institute (1987). In 1983 he compiled publications on ferritin into an MD thesis for which he was awarded the Bellahouston Medal by Glasgow University. He was a member of the US National Academy of Sciences from 1974, and had an honorary doctorate from the University of Nancy, France.

Although he continued to work until the age of 75, and added to his scientific publications even in his last years, he was increasingly disabled by Parkinson's disease and died of complications of this in Glasgow on 28 October 1994. His ashes were buried on the east side of Highgate Cemetery with those of his wife, Edith.

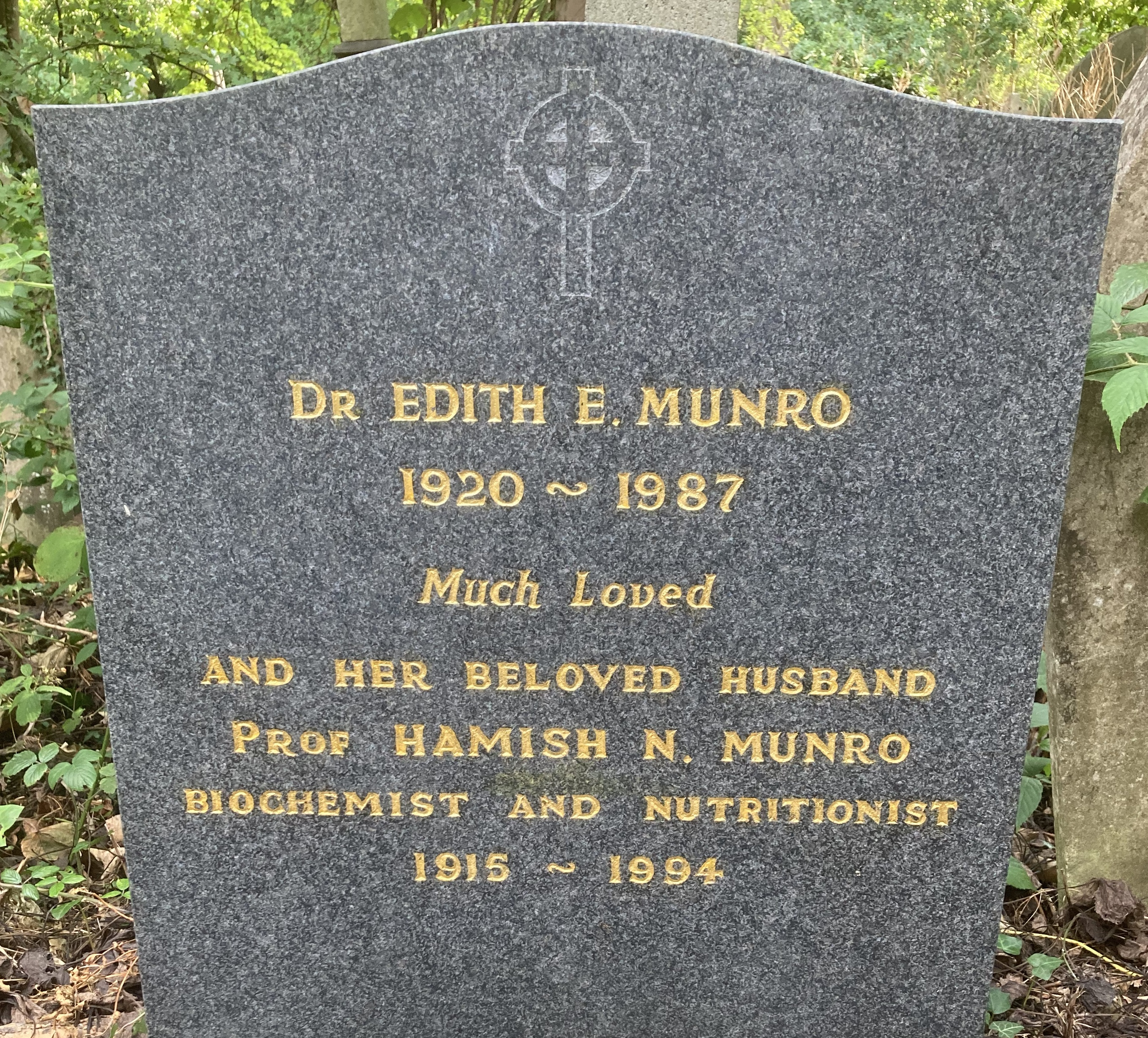
Grave of Hamish Munro in Highgate Cemetery

== Family ==
During a study of scurvy he met a medical colleague, Dr Edith Little (1920-1987), whom he married in 1946. They had one daughter and three sons, brought up in Glasgow and Boston. After the children had left home, Edith returned to the UK where she pursued her own career as a psychiatrist, but the family remained integrated.

== Publications ==
- Mammalian Protein Metabolism (1964)
