= Martin Melvin =

Martin Melvin may refer to:

- Martin Melvin (businessman) (1879–1952), British businessman and newspaper manager
- Martin Melvin (footballer) (born 1969), Scottish footballer

== See also ==
- Martin Melvin Cruickshank (1888–1964), Scottish surgeon
