= George M. Wishart =

Scottish physiologist (1895–1958)

George MacFeat Wishart FRSE FRCPG (1895–1958) was a 20th-century Scottish physiologist.

== Life ==
He was born in Glasgow on 18 August 1895, the son of George Wishart, a grain merchant. He was educated at Uddingston Grammar School.

He studied medicine at the University of Glasgow graduating with a BSc in 1916 and qualified with a MB ChB in 1918. He saw brief service with the medical arm of the Royal Air Force during World War I. He gained his MD in 1926.

In 1921, he became the Grieve Lecturer in Physiology at the University of Glasgow, becoming Senior Lecturer in 1934. In 1935, he was appointed Gardiner Professor of Physiological Chemistry at the University, succeeding Andrew Hunter.

In 1939, he was elected a Fellow of the Royal Society of Edinburgh. His proposers were John Walton, Edward Hindle, George Barger and George Tyrrell.

In 1947, he became Director of Postgraduate Medical Education at the University of Glasgow.

He died in office on 18 July 1958.

He was succeeded by Professor James Norman Davidson.

== Publications ==
Together with Robert Campbell Garry he was editor of the Journal of Physiology and European Journal of Applied Physiology.

- Basal Metabolism (1926)
- Physics in Physiology

== Family ==
In 1926, he married Elizabeth Mary Bedale, who had worked as his assistant. Together they had two daughters.
