= Alexander David Peacock =

British zoologist (1886–1976)

Alexander David Peacock FRSE (1886–1976) was a 20th-century British zoologist.

== Life ==
He was born on 13 June 1886 in Newcastle-upon-Tyne the son of James Peacock, a grocer, and his wife, Jane Briggs. He was educated at Newcastle Royal Grammar School then studied Natural Science at Armstrong College in Newcastle, graduating BSc in 1904. Continuing as a postgraduate he gained an MSc and DSc at Durham University. As a postgraduate he taught both at Jarrow School and lectured in Zoology at Armstrong College.

In 1911 he went to Africa to teach at the Nigerian Agriculture Department. He returned to Newcastle in 1913 to lecture in zoology at Armstrong College but this was interrupted by the First World War. As a Territorial he was immediately called up, serving in the Royal Army Medical Corps in Flanders. However, he was recalled to Britain to help training, lecturing in insect effects on troops and on trench fever, under the rank of captain. He returned to Armstrong in 1919.

In 1923 he was elected a Fellow of the Royal Society of Edinburgh. His proposers were Sir James Hartley Ashworth, John William Heslop-Harrison, George Leslie Purser, and John Stephenson. He won the Society's Keith Prize for the period 1953 to 1955.

In 1926 he became Professor of Natural History at University College, Dundee, which was then a part of the University of St Andrews. The following year, he was awarded a DSc for his research into trench fever. In the Second World War he was in charge of pest control in relation to Scotland's food supply, under the Ministry of Supply. In Dundee he was involved deeply with the local Polish community and was president of the city's Polish Society. He also took a strong interest in adult education and was a member of the local Education Committee as well as the Workers' Education Association.

He died in York on 2 March 1976 aged 89.

His academic and other papers are held by Archive Services at the University of Dundee.

== Family ==
In 1917, he married with Clara Mary Turner. Their daughter Joan Peacock was born in 1918. Another of their children was the noted economist and academic Sir Alan Turner Peacock, born in 1922.

== Publications ==
- Animal Life in the Dundee District (1936)
- An Introduction to Plant, Animal and Human Biology (1939)
- We See Twice as Much as Before (1941) on Scottish-Polish relationships
- The Biology and Control of the Ant Pest Monomorium Pharaonis (1950)
- Patrick Geddes: Biologist (1954)
