= Malcolm Wilson (botanist) =

Malcolm Wilson FRSE FLS (1882–1960) was a 20th-century Scottish botanist and mycologist. He was an expert on the identification of dry rot and its remediation.

== Life ==
Wilson studied science at the University of London, graduating with a BSc in 1905. In 1909 he became Senior Demonstrator in Botany at Imperial College, London. He gained a doctorate (DSc) in 1911. He was created a Fellow of the Linnean Society in 1910.

He joined the Botany Department of the University of Edinburgh in 1911 as the first lecturer in mycology and bacteriology.

During the First World War he returned to London to serve as a pathologist at the County of London War Hospital. He returned to the University of Edinburgh after the war.

In 1920 he was elected a Fellow of the Royal Society of Edinburgh. His proposers were Sir Isaac Bayley Balfour, Frederick Orpen Bower, James Hartley Ashworth and Robert Wallace.

His students included Dr Mary Noble (1911-2002) and Douglas Mackay Henderson.

He retired in 1951 and went to live with his son Graham in Sheffield, dying there on 8 July 1960.

== Family ==
He was father to Graham Malcolm Wilson and Cedric Wilson.

== Publications ==
- The Blueing of Coniferous Timber (1923)
- British Rust Fungi (completed and published by Douglas Mackay Henderson in 1966)
