= Lenman =

Lenman is a surname. Notable people with the surname include:

- J. A. R. Lenman (1924–1985), British neurologist and medical author
- James Lenman, British philosopher
- Jamie Lenman (born 1982), English musician and illustrator

== See also ==
- Lehman (surname)
