= C. W. M. Wilson =

British pharmacologist and medical historian

Cedric William Malcolm Wilson FRSE (23 November 1923 – 27 November 1993) was a 20th-century Scottish pharmacologist and medical historian. In authorship he appears as C. W. M. Wilson. He was founder of the Scottish Society of the History of Medicine.

== Life ==
He was born in Edinburgh on 23 November 1923, the son of the botanist Malcolm Wilson. He was educated at Edinburgh Academy 1933 to 1943 then studied medicine at the University of Edinburgh graduating with an MB ChB in 1949. He gained a PhD in pharmacology in 1954 and his medical doctorate (MD) in 1958.

In 1955 he began lecturing in pharmacology at the University of Liverpool going on to become the Professor of Pharmacology at Trinity College Dublin. He then returned to practical medicine as Consulting Physician at Law Hospital in Carluke.

He was elected a Fellow of the Royal Society of Edinburgh in 1972. His proposers were William Wright, William Alexander Bain, James Graham, and Derrick Dunlop.

He died on 27 November 1993, a few days after his 70th birthday.

== Publications ==
- Scottish Medical Traditions (1957)
- Therapeutic Sources for Prescribing in Great Britain (1963)
- The Pharmacological and Epidemiological Aspects of Adolescent Drug Dependence (1966)
- The Common Cold and Vitamin C (1973)
- Environmental Therapy (1983)

He was a regular contributor to the Journal of Parapsychology

== Family ==
His older brother was Graham Malcolm Wilson.
