= Martin Smellie =

Scottish biochemist and professor

Robert Martin Stuart Smellie FRSE FIB (1927–1988) was a 20th-century Scottish biochemist and first Cathcart Professor of Biochemistry at the University of Glasgow. The university's Smellie Prize is named after him.

== Life ==
He was born in Rothesay on 1 April 1927, the son of Rev William Thomas Smellie, the local minister, and his wife, Jean Craig. He was educated at the High School of Dundee and Glasgow Academy. He graduated B.Sc from the University of St Andrews in 1947 but was then asked to serve two years National Service. During this period he was commissioned into the Royal Scots Fusiliers and with the Chemical Defence Establishment at Porton Down, where he worked on nerve gases.

In 1949 he became assistant to Professor Norman Davidson at the University of Glasgow.

In 1964 he was elected a Fellow of the Royal Society of Edinburgh. His proposers were James Norman Davidson, Robert Garry, Hamish Munro and Michael Stoker. He served as General Secretary of the Society 1976 to 1986 and won their Bicentenary Medal in 1986.

In 1966 he became Professor of Biochemistry at Glasgow.

He died on 12 March 1988.

== Family ==
In 1954 he married Florence Mary Devlin Adam, a physician.

== Publication ==
- From Molecules to Man (1966)
- Current Trends in the Biochemistry of Lipids (1972)
