= J. A. R. Lenman =

British neurologist and medical author

John Andrew Reginald Lenman FRSE FRCPE (1924 – 3 June 1985) was a British neurologist and medical author.

== Life ==
He was born at Shillong in India in 1924, the son of the Bishop of Bhagalpur. He was educated at the Rudolph Steiner School in London. He then studied medicine at the University of Edinburgh, graduating with an MB ChB in 1948. He undertook further training under Sir Stanley Davidson and Professor Norman Dott.

During his two years National Service, he served with the RAF as a clinical pathologist, based in Singapore.

From 1960 he lectured in neurology at the University of Dundee. In 1979 he was elected a Fellow of the Royal Society of Edinburgh. His proposers were Anthony Elliot Ritchie, Sir Ian George Wilson Hill, Martin Smellie and Norrie Everitt.

He died after a prolonged illness on 3 June 1985.

== Family ==
He was married to Frances and had three daughters and one son.

== Publications ==
See

- Clinical Electromyography (1970) co-written with Anthony Elliot Ritchie
- Clinical Neurophysiology (1975)
- Neurological Therapeutics (1981)
