= Hugh Blackburn =

Scottish mathematician (1823 – 1909)

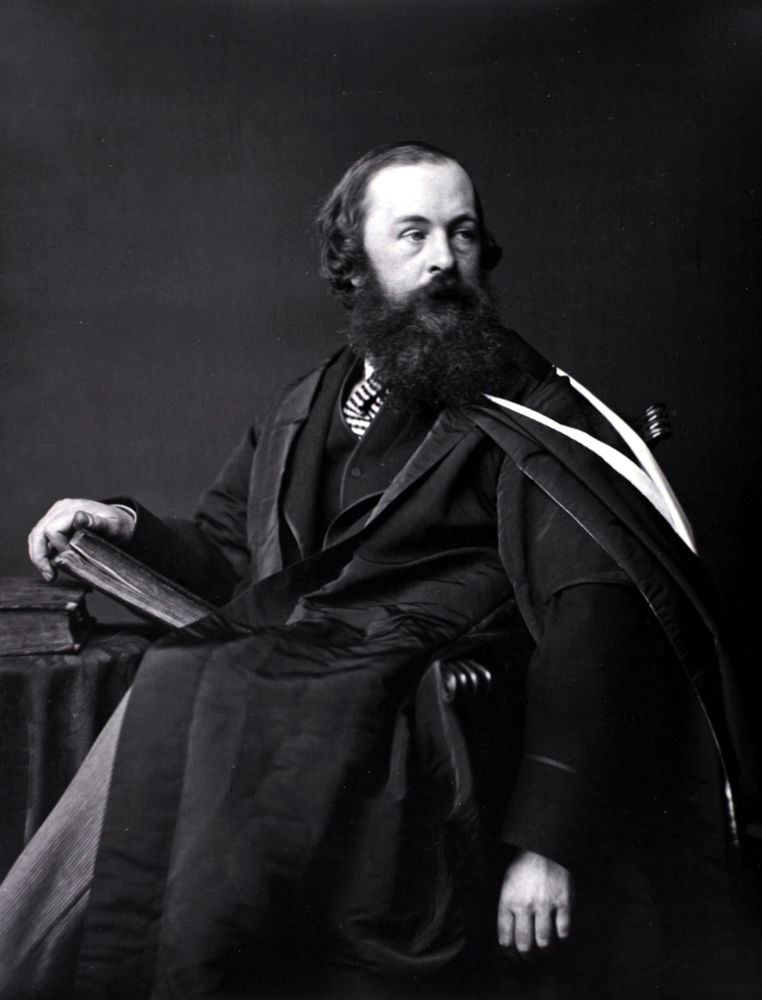
- Born: 2 July 1823; Craigflower, Torryburn, Fife
- Died: 9 October 1909; Roshven, Inverness-shire

Bailie Hugh Blackburn (/ˈblækbərn/) (2 July 1823 – 9 October 1909) was a Scottish mathematician. A lifelong friend of William Thomson (later Lord Kelvin) and the husband of illustrator Jemima Blackburn, he was professor of mathematics at the University of Glasgow from 1849 to 1879. He succeeded Thomson's father James in the chair of mathematics.

== Life ==
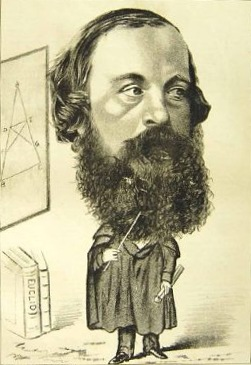
An 1877 caricature of Hugh Blackburn

Blackburn was born on 2 July 1823 in Craigflower, Torryburn, Fife. He was brought up at Killearn House, Stirlingshire, the seventh of eight children of wealthy Glasgow merchant John Blackburn and his wife Rebecca Leslie Gillies, the daughter of a Church of Scotland minister and a relative of Colin Maclaurin. His elder brother was Judge Colin Blackburn, Baron Blackburn. His father became wealthy off sugar and slavery in Jamaica, becoming a merchant on his return to Glasgow. In the 1830s, when the British government emancipated the slaves, John received compensation for the ownership of over 550 slaves.

Blackburn was educated at the Edinburgh Academy and Eton before entering Trinity College, Cambridge in 1840. There he met Thomson, who entered in the same year; he was also a member of the Cambridge Apostles. During this time he invented the Blackburn pendulum. In the Mathematical Tripos examinations of 1845 he graduated fifth wrangler, while Thomson graduated second wrangler.

He entered the Inner Temple in 1847 but was never called to the bar; his name was withdrawn in 1849, the year in which he became a professor of mathematics at the University of Glasgow. He married Jemima Wedderburn (cousin of James Clerk Maxwell), the daughter of James Wedderburn, Solicitor General for Scotland. He died on 9 October 1909 at his estate in Roshven, Inverness-shire.

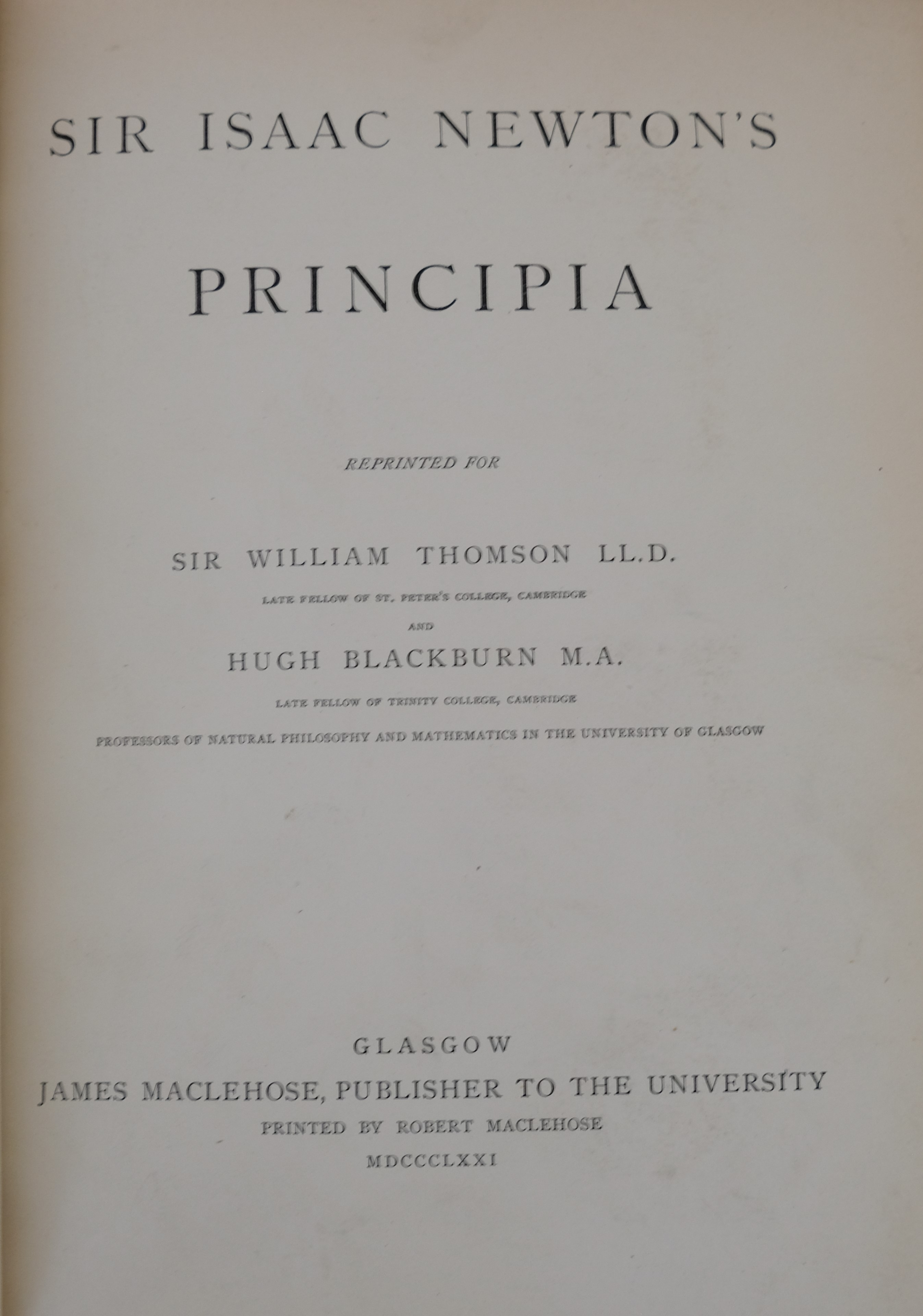
Title page in an 1871 copy of Philosophiae Naturalis Principia Mathematica by Isaac Newton, with a dedication to Blackburn and William Thomson

== Works ==
- A treatise on trigonometry, London, 1855. Part of the Encyclopedia Metropolitana.
- A short sketch of the constitutional history of the University of Glasgow and of Glasgow College in that University: with remarks on the Universities (Scotland) Bill, 1858
- (ed. with William Thomson ) Sir Isaac Newton's Principia, 1871
- Elements of plane trigonometry for the use of the junior class of mathematics in the University of Glasgow, 1871
