= Roshven =

Township in Scottish Highlands

Coordinates: 56.838°N 5.758°W

Roshven: Scottish Gaelic: Roisbheinn
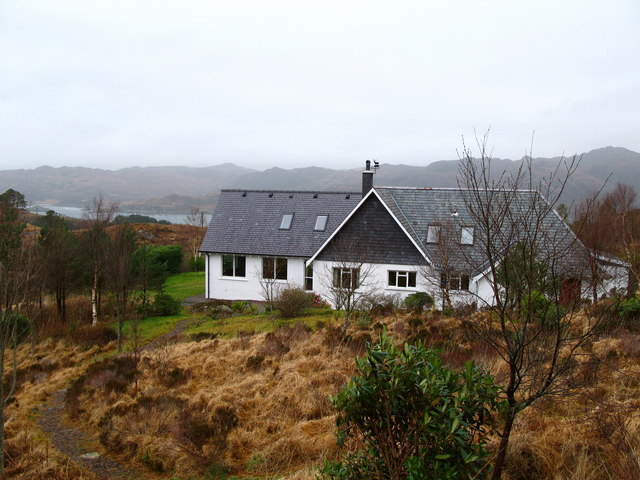
- Marino Lodge

- Location within the Lochaber area
- OS grid reference: NM7078
- Civil parish: Arisaig and Moidart
- Council area: Highland
- Lieutenancy area: Inverness
- Country: Scotland
- Sovereign state: United Kingdom
- Post town: LOCHAILORT
- Postcode district: PH38
- Dialling code: 01687
- Police: Scotland
- Fire: Scottish
- Ambulance: Scottish
- UK Parliament: Ross, Skye and Lochaber
- Scottish Parliament: Skye, Lochaber and Badenoch

Roshven (Scottish Gaelic: Roisbheinn) is a township located on the eastern shoreline of Loch Ailort, in Lochaber, in the council area of Highland, Scotland. Towering above it is Rois-bheinn, the highest hill in the area.

== History ==
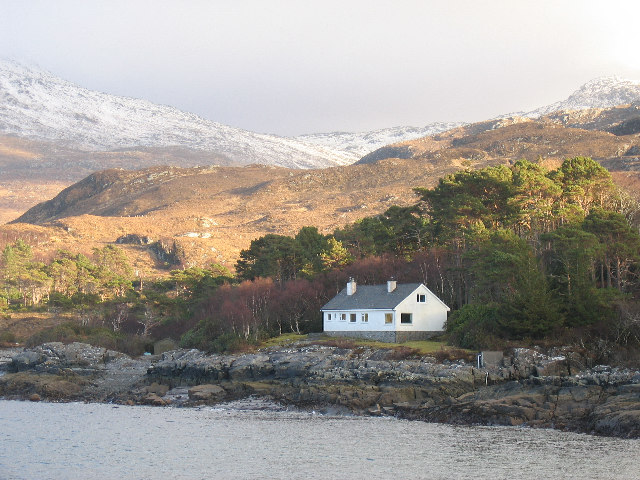
Grounds of what was the Roshven House, home to the Blackburns

Historically, the hamlet was named Irin. Ranald Macdonald, younger brother of Donald Macdonald 4th of Kinlochmoidart, was granted the tack of Irin from Clanranald in 1749. According to the 1841 census, the main house by the burn was occupied by a Mary Anderson, originally from Kinlochailort. In 1854, Jemima Blackburn, an artist, and her husband, Hugh Blackburn, professor of mathematics at the University of Glasgow, bought the Roshven Estate, from Doctor Donald Martin of the Beallach family. Blackburn was noted for capturing the area's scenery, flora and fauna in her nationally famous illustrations. She was particularly adept at painting birds and flowers.

Roshven Estate covered some 4500 acres. They subsequently renovated the Georgian house in the hamlet. Their homes in Glasgow and at Roshven became a focus for visits from some of the most celebrated figures of the century including John Ruskin, Sir John Everett Millais, Anthony Trollope, the Duke of Argyll, Benjamin Disraeli, Lord Lister, Professor Helmholtz, Lord Kelvin and James Clerk-Maxwell, Jemima's first cousin.

Roshven was originally intended to be the terminus for the Mallaig Extension Railway. Opposition from landowners resulted in the West Highland Line being constructed to Mallaig instead, with the railway opening in April 1901. Roshven has therefore never been served by railway.

On 12 January 1894, around 11.50 pm, the aftershock of an earthquake measuring 4 on the Richter scale was experienced at Roshven and the settlements of Arisaig and Glenmoidart.

== Geography and climate ==
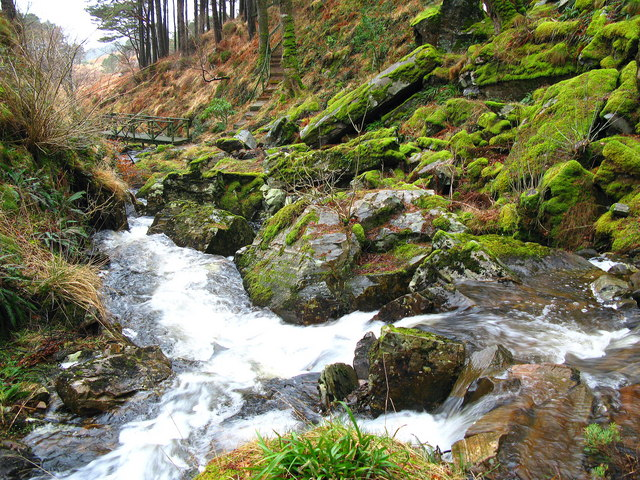
Two burns meet at Roshven

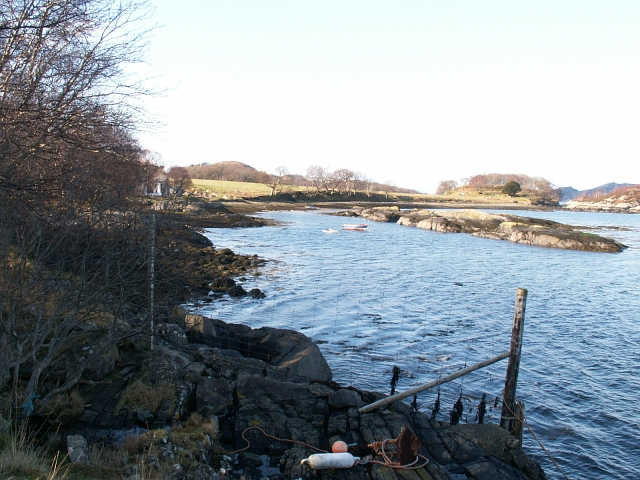
Anchorage point near Roshven Farm

Roshven is situated in the Highlands of Scotland, in the area of Lochaber. It lies on the southeastern bank of Loch Ailort along the A861 road, southwest of the settlement of Inverailort and east of Glenuig. Boats can be moored in shallow water on the Loch near Roshven House. At one time there were plans to build a terminal and a pier at Roshven. The area is mountainous, Rois-Bheinn being the highest and most dominant mountain, although Roshven is surrounded by other mountains such as An Stac, Sgurr Na Ba Glaise and Sgurr Dhomhuill Mor. The largest burn that comes through Roshven is the Irin Burn which originates in Lochan na Craoihhe and runs down past Roshven Farm. Its estuary is located on the shore in front of the farm.

Roshven has quite a varied and unpredictable climate. Fort William which is located around 30 miles away experiences on average 3500-4500mm of rainfall every year. It experiences warm and wet summers and mild and wet winters. Snow is not very frequent because Roshven, like much of Lochaber, is subject to warm, moist air from the Gulf Stream. According to the Royal Meteorological Society, one of the descendants of Hugh and Jemima Blackburn, Vera Philippa Blackburn (widow of William) who died in 1932, was keen on meteorology and had kept a rain gauge at Roshven in which she recorded the climate and rainfall for many years.

== Wildlife ==
=== Fauna ===
Like many Highland areas, many forms of wildlife are found at Roshven, both aquatic and land-based. In Loch Ailort there are many varieties of fish found such as mackerel, sea trout and salmon. Brown trout are also found in the burns and streams which run down off the surrounding hills. There have been occasional sitings of dolphins and whales in the loch, and once a whale died after being washed up onto the beach. Deer, foxes, wild cats, squirrels and pine martens are regularly seen in the area. The birds however are the major attraction of Roshven and this is what inspired Blackburn in her paintings. Golden eagles are often seen either flying over the loch or, more frequently, in front of the mountains and trees.

=== Flora ===
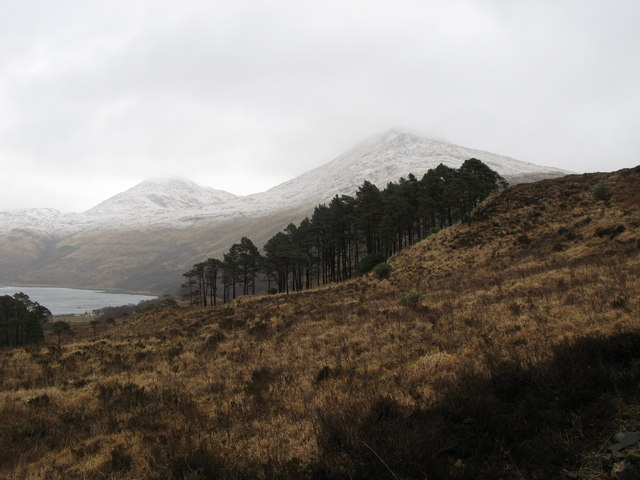
Vegetation at Roshven Estate

The vegetation growing at Roshven is lush, due to plentiful rainfall, but somewhat varied. One of the main plants is rhododendron, and trees such as Scots pine, oak, birch and ash are common. Despite the rainfall, however, the land is not good for growing crops because the soil is thin, lacks fertility and can often be too inundated with water.

== Economic and business ==
Tourism is important to the local economy. The Roshven Farm contains five chalets which are let out to visitors. Deer stalking is carried out on the hills as well as hillwalking, fishing, sailing and rock climbing. Hill sheep farming is also practised and hay and silage are also grown on the lower, shore-bordering fields as these have thicker soils and can be used to produce food for cattle and sheep to feed on in the winter.
