= Rona MacKie =

British dermatologist (born 1940)

Professor Rona MacKie CBE FRSE FMedSci FRCP FRCPath

Professor of Dermatology, University of Glasgow
- In office 1978–2001

Personal details
- Born: Rona McLeod Davidson; 22 May 1940 (age 86) Dundee, Scotland
- Education: Laurel Bank School; University of Glasgow

Rona McLeod, Lady Black (née Davidson; born 22 May 1940), known professionally as Rona MacKie, is a British dermatologist.

== Early life and family ==
Rona McLeod Davidson was born in Dundee in 1940, the daughter of Dr Morag (née McLeod) and Professor James Norman Davidson. Her father was Gardiner Professor of Biochemistry at the University of Glasgow from 1947 to 1972. Davidson attended Laurel Bank School, before studying medicine at the University of Glasgow. She graduated with an MB ChB in 1963, and received an MD with commendation in 1970.

== Career ==
Mackie held junior posts in Glasgow hospitals between completing her medical qualifications and obtaining her doctorate in 1970. She became a member of the Royal College of Physicians (MRCP) in 1971. Between 1971 and 1972, she was a lecturer in Dermatology at the University of Glasgow, and then spent six years as a consultant dermatologist with Greater Glasgow Health Board. In 1978, she returned to the University of Glasgow as Professor of Dermatology, the first female professor at the University of Glasgow. She remained in this post until 2001, when she was appointed as a senior research fellow in the Faculty of Medicine. Mackie's principal interest is skin cancer, particularly melanoma.

In 1983, she was elected a Fellow of the Royal Society of Edinburgh, in 1984, she became a Fellow of the Royal College of Pathologists and in 1985, a Fellow of the Royal College of Physicians. In 1994, she received a DSc from the University of Glasgow. In 1998, she was among the founding fellows of the Academy of Medical Sciences, and in 1999 the British Association of Dermatologists awarded her the Sir Archibald Grey Medal. In the 1999 Birthday Honours, Mackie was appointed a Commander of the Order of the British Empire. She received the Bicentenary Medal from the Royal Society of Edinburgh in 2007 and the Medal for Dermatological Research from the British Society for Investigative Dermatology two years later.
