= Mary Noble =

Scottish seed pathologist

Mary Jessie MacDonald Noble ISO FRSE FIB (23 February 1911 – 20 July 2002) was a seed pathologist for the Department of Agriculture for Scotland and was key in producing the Handbook of Seed-borne Diseases.

== Life ==
She was born in Edinburgh the daughter of John Noble a pharmacist on Gladstone Place on Leith Links. The family lived at 37 Willowbrae Road.

She was educated privately at the Mary Erskine School and went on to study botany at the University of Edinburgh from 1920 to 1935, under Dr Malcolm Wilson, where she earned an honours degree in botany. She then earned a PhD on the mycological aspects of seed pathology.

After university, she joined the plant pathology service of the Board of Agriculture (now known as SASA) based in the Royal Botanic Gardens, Edinburgh. In Noble's career on plant pathology, seeds were her main focus. In 1958 she was elected as Fellow of the Royal Society of Edinburgh (one of the few female Fellows). Her proposers were Malcolm Wilson, Charles Edward Foister, John Anthony and Sir William Wright Smith. She won the Society's Gunning Victoria Jubilee Prize.

As well as becoming a Fellow, she also served as a councillor for British Mycological Society and the Association of Applied Biologists. She was also a member of the International Seed Testing Association and, along with Dr Paul Neergaard and Dr Jo deTempe, produced an Annotated List of Seed-borne Diseases (4th edition, ISTA, 1990). In 1971, she retired as principal scientific officer for seed pathology and mycology at the Agriculture Scientific Society for the Department of Agriculture and Fisheries for Scotland.

Noble retired in 1971 and died on 20 July 2002 in Lasswade.
