= Martin Melvin Cruickshank =

Scottish surgeon

Brigadier Martin Melvin Cruickshank CIE FRSE FRCSE FACS (1888–1964) was a Scottish surgeon, specialising in ophthalmic surgery. During the Second World War he was Chief Medical Officer for Delhi Province. He was created Companion of the Indian Empire in 1942.

== Life ==
He was born in North Leith, the harbour area of Edinburgh on 22 March 1888, the son of George Hunter Cruickshank a marine engineer. He was a twin brother of Ernest Cruickshank. The family moved to Aberdeen around 1895 and he attended Robert Gordon's College with his twin. They then jointly studied medicine at Aberdeen University. He graduated BSc in 1911 (a year after his brother).

In the First World War he joined the Royal Army Medical Corps, again with his twin, but they quickly were separated by events. He saw service in France, Belgium, Macedonia, Serbia, Egypt and Bulgaria. He rose to the rank of captain in this period.

After the war he remained in the army and joined the Indian Medical Service. From 1921 to 1931 he acted as the Ophthalmic Specialist for the Northern and Western commands in India. After a period serving with the Madras Presidency, in 1934 he joined Madras Medical College as Professor of Surgery. In 1940 he was appointed Chief Medical Officer for the entire Delhi Province. During the Second World War he was promoted to Brigadier/ Consultant Surgeon to the Southern Army in India.

He was elected a Fellow of the Royal Society of Edinburgh in 1938. His proposers were his twin Ernest (who was elected in 1929), Leybourne Davidson, Sir John Carroll, and James R Matthews.

In January 1942 New Year Honours he was created a Companion of the Indian Empire for his services in India. In 1946 he returned to Aberdeen and spent his final 12 working years as Deputy Superintendent of Aberdeen Royal Infirmary. He retired aged 70.

He died at 62 Queens Road in Aberdeen on 10 October 1964. His twin brother Ernest died a few weeks later.

== Family ==
He married Florence Watson in 1927.
