= Glenuig =

Coordinates: 56.82981°N 5.819°W

Glenuig: Scottish Gaelic: Ghlìnn-Ùige
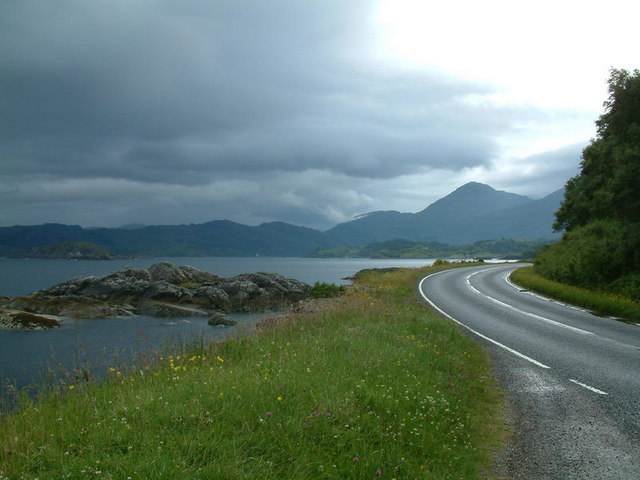
- Glenuig Bay

- Location within the Lochaber area
- OS grid reference: NM6708177432
- Council area: Highland
- Lieutenancy area: Inverness
- Country: Scotland
- Sovereign state: United Kingdom
- Post town: Lochailort
- Postcode district: PH38
- Dialling code: 01217
- Police: Scotland
- Fire: Scottish
- Ambulance: Scottish
- UK Parliament: Argyll, Bute and South Lochaber
- Scottish Parliament: Skye, Lochaber and Badenoch

Glenuig (/ɡlɛˈnuːɪɡ/ glen-OO-ig, Scottish Gaelic: Ghlìnn-Ùige) is a small village in Moidart, Lochaber, Highland, on the west coast of Scotland. It is around 30 miles (50 kilometres) west of Fort William and 20 miles (30 kilometres) from Ardnamurchan Point.

== Geography ==
Glenuig is a tiny community of just over thirty people located in the parish of Moidart in remote west Lochaber. Nowadays it is taken to include the neighbouring settlements of Samalaman and Alt Ruadh, and contains 21 houses in permanent occupation plus four holiday homes. In a wider sense it includes the nearby hamlets of Roshven and Lochailort, bringing the population over a distance of eight miles (thirteen kilometres) to just over fifty.

Access to Glenuig by public road was only made possible in 1966, and mains electricity arrived in 1983. A growing population of young people saw the revival of Glenuig Village Hall Committee in 1982, running the village hall situated in the old School Room. In 1993 the Hall Committee changed to become Glenuig Community Association.

== History ==
The area has been inhabited for thousands of years, and traces of these earlier residents are everywhere around. The coastal regions here are wild and rocky, but because of the warmer climate within the last two thousand years the inland areas were productive and heavily populated. In the last two hundred years, the population declined through enforced clearances of the glens for sheep and voluntary emigration from the harsher coastal regions to the new colonies, particularly Cape Breton and America.

From 1783 to 1803, Samalaman House, on the outskirts of Glenuig, was the location of a seminary for the underground Catholic Church in Scotland.

Prior to 1966, access was by foot or horseback (from either Lochailort or Kinlochmoidart) or by boat. Since that year, the area has been accessible by a good modern road.

== Facilities ==
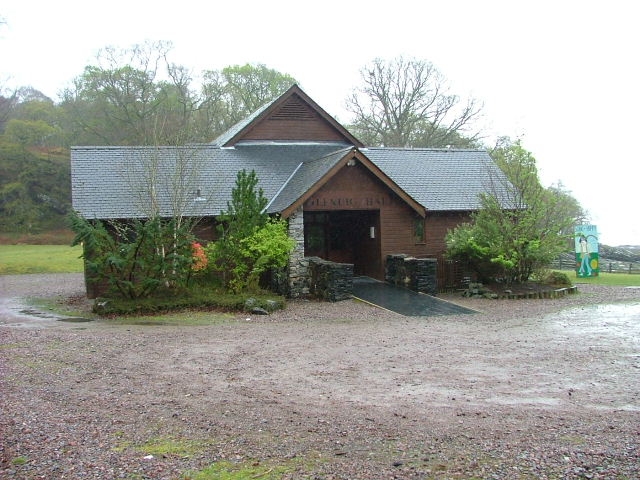
Glenuig Hall

Nowadays Glenuig is a thriving community. Occupations include fishing, crofting, building, craftwork and IT, and catering for the many visitors to the area. The community has a small shop and post office and a variety of accommodation choices in Glenuig, Kinlochmoidart, Roshven and Lochailort.

The village hall is a popular venue for entertainment. There is regular traditional folk music, fiddlers, blues bands, opera and dance and a range of community activities ranging from yoga, playgroups and youth nights to the meetings of the Moidart Local History Group.

Glenuig Community Association (GCA) has been responsible for several initiatives in the area. Through determined fundraising, notably through the Glenuig Music Festival (1983–1993) the local community funded the construction of Glenuig Hall. The hall is owned and managed by the GCA, and the Association is currently looking into the future of the village shop, hoping to build new premises and re-open the shop to be run as a community enterprise.

== Gallery ==
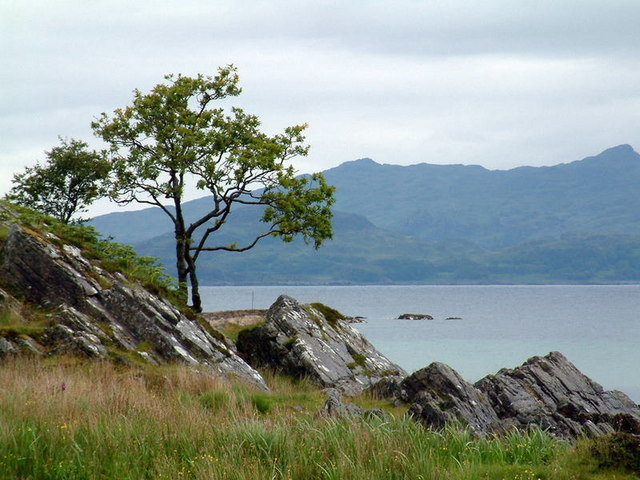
Glenuig Bay

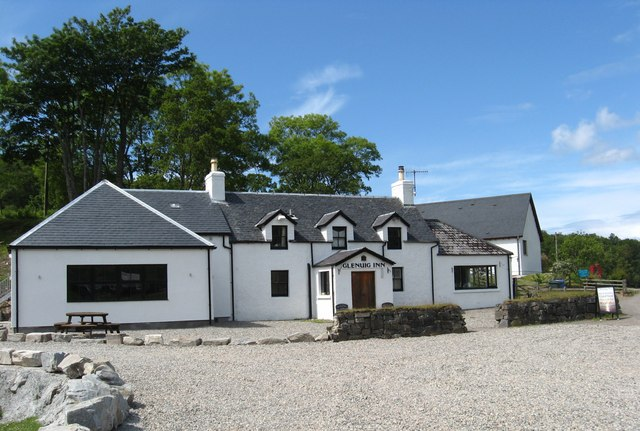
Glenuig Inn

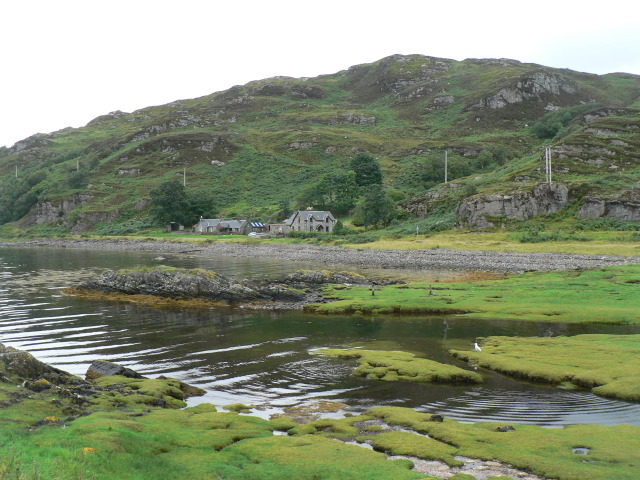
View across bay

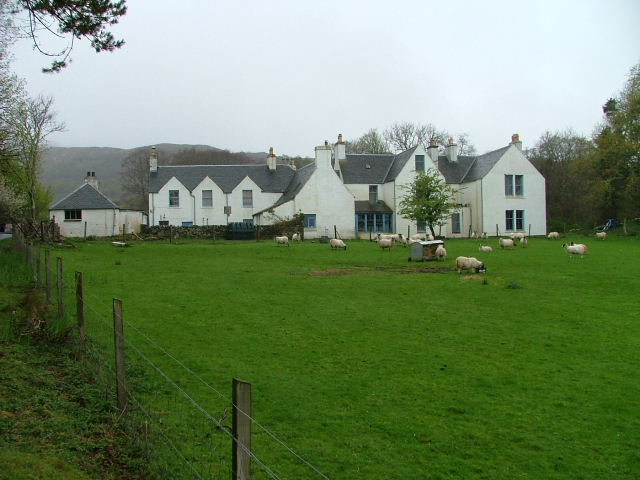
Samalaman House

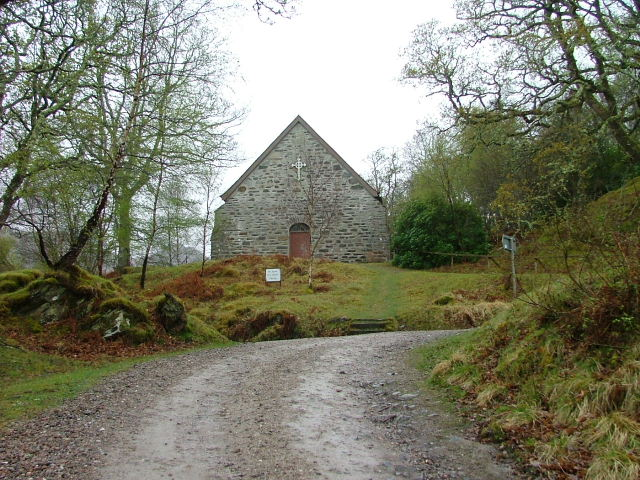
St Agnes Church
