= George Leslie Purser =

English zoologist and embryologist

George Leslie Purser FRSE (23 December 1891–20 July 1967) was a 20th-century English zoologist and embryologist.

== Life ==
He was born in the Moseley district of Birmingham on 23 December 1891 the son of Harriet Annie Purser (1862-1952) and her husband, George Jesse Purser (1853-1927).

He studied natural sciences at the University of Cambridge graduating with an MA in 1915. He immediately began lecturing in embryology and histology at the University of Glasgow moving to the University of Edinburgh around 1918.

In 1920 he was elected a Fellow of the Royal Society of Edinburgh. His proposers were James Hartley Ashworth, James Cossar Ewart, James Lorrain Smith and Alexander Laurie.

He moved to the University of Aberdeen in the 1920s and remained there until retiral in 1955.

He died on 20 July 1967 and is buried with his parents in Felixstowe Municipal Cemetery.

== Publications ==
- Embryology and Evolution (1930)
- Anatomy and Histology of Fishes
- Reproduction of Lebistes Reticulatus
