= Norman Davidson (biochemist) =

British molecular biologist (1911–1972)

- Born: James Norman Davidson; 5 March 1911
- Died: 11 September 1972 (aged 61)
- Citizenship: British
- Education: University of Edinburgh
- Awards: Fellow of the Royal Society; FRSE
- Scientific career
- Fields: Biochemistry
- Workplaces: University of Aberdeen; University of St Andrews; University of Glasgow

James Norman Davidson CBE PRSE FRS (5 March 1911 – 11 September 1972) was a British biochemist, pioneer molecular biologist and textbook author. The Davidson Building at the University of Glasgow is named for him.

== Life ==
He was the only child of Wilhelmina Ibberson Foote and James Davidson FRSE FSA (1873-1956) a lawyer, Treasurer of the Carnegie Trust for the Universities of Scotland and originally from Aberdeenshire. He was born in Edinburgh on 5 March 1911 and lived in the family home of 30 Bruntsfield Gardens in the south of the city. He was educated locally, at George Watson's College, where he was dux.

He then studied Medicine and Organic Chemistry at the University of Edinburgh graduating with a BSc in 1934, The topic of his DSc thesis was biochemical investigations on cellular proliferation.

In 1937/38, he studied under Otto Heinrich Warburg in Berlin-Dahlem. He returned to Scotland in autumn of 1938 to begin lecturing in biochemistry at the University of St Andrews. From 1940 to 1945 he was Senior Lecturer in Biochemistry at the University of Aberdeen.

In 1941, he was elected a Fellow of the Royal Society of Edinburgh. His proposers were James Kendall, Ernest Cruickshank, Robert Campbell Garry, and Anderson Gray M'Kendrick. He was Secretary to the Society 1949–1954, Vice President 1955-58 and served two terms as president from 1958 to 1959 and 1964–67. He was elected as a Fellow of the Royal Society in 1960.

Davidson was Professor of Biochemistry at the University of Glasgow from 1947 to 1972. In 1949 he appointed Martin Smellie as his assistant.

In 1958, he succeeded George M. Wishart as the Gardiner Professor of Physiology at the University of Glasgow.

He was made a Commander of the Order of the British Empire (CBE) in 1967.

He died of a heart attack in Bearsden in Glasgow on 11 September 1972.

== Publications ==
- The Biochemistry of Nucleic Acids (1950)

== Family ==
In 1938, he married Morag McLeod (now Dr Morag Davidson). Their children included Rona McLeod MacKie FRSE (b.1940) and Ailsa Morag Campbell FRSE (b.1943).
