= Ernest Cruickshank =

Scottish physician and physiologist (1888-1964)

Ernest William Henderson Cruickshank
- Born: 22 March 1888; Leith
- Died: 29 December 1964; Aberdeen
- Occupation(s): Physician, physiologist

Ernest William Henderson Cruickshank FRSE LLD (22 March 1888 – 29 December 1964) was a Scottish physician and physiologist. He was the author of several textbooks on nutrition.

His book Food and Nutrition was an influential best-seller. It looks at the evolution of human diets, protein needs within the body and problems of world malnutrition.

== Life ==
He was born in Leith on 22 March 1888, the son of George Hunter Cruickshank. He had a twin brother, Martin Melvin Cruickshank. He was educated at Robert Gordon's College and studied medicine at Aberdeen University graduating MB ChB in 1910. He then attended University College, London as a research fellow 1912-14.

In the First World War he joined the Royal Army Medical Corps with his twin brother, but quickly they were separated by events. He was commissioned as a lieutenant in February 1916 rose to the rank of captain, serving in both France and Italy. In 1919 he was based in Cologne as part of the Prisoners of War Repatriation Command for the 3rd Bavarian Army Corps.

After the war he became an associate at the University of Washington School of Medicine. Aberdeen University granted him an honorary MD in 1920. He then spent until 1935 as a travelling professor, lecturing in US, Canada, China and India regarding physiology and nutrition. During this period he became the first appointee in physiology at the Peking Union Medical College. From 1935 until 1958 he remained in Scotland as professor of physiology at Aberdeen University.

In 1929 he was elected a fellow of the Royal Society of Edinburgh. His proposers were Diarmid Noel Paton, Sir Edward Albert Sharpey-Schafer, Sir Edmund Taylor Whittaker, and Ralph Allan Sampson.

Aberdeen University awarded him an honorary Doctor of Letters (LLD) in 1959.

He died on 29 December 1964 in Aberdeen.

== Family ==
In 1930 he married Bertha Christina Steventon.

== Publications ==
- Methods and Problems of Medical Education (1926) reprinted 1930
- Practical Biochemistry for Students (1928)
- Methods and Problems of Medical Education (1926) reprinted 1930
- Food and Physical Fitness (1938)
- Teaching Nutrition in Biology Classes (1939)
- Food and Nutrition (1946) plus multiple reprints
