= James Hartley Ashworth =

British marine zoologist (1874–1936)

Professor James Hartley Ashworth FRS FRSE FZS
- Ashworth in 1931.

Professor of Natural History, University of Edinburgh
- In office 1927–1936

Professor of Zoology, University of Edinburgh
- In office 1919–1927

Personal details
- Born: 2 May 1874 Accrington, Lancashire, England
- Died: 4 February 1936 (aged 61)

James Hartley Ashworth (2 May 1874 – 4 February 1936) was a British marine zoologist.

== Life ==
See

He was born on 2, May 1874, in Accrington in Lancashire, the only son of James Ashworth.

He spent most of his early life in Burnley, attending the Carlton Road School there. He appears to have befriended Dr James MacKenzie during his youth, due to MacKenzie's role as the family GP, and his interest in science was awakened. MacKenzie appears to have had a mentoring role during his teenage years. Ashworth was encouraged to train, and went to Manchester to study chemistry at Owen's College. Here he quickly found a new interest and changed to study zoology. He then moved to London University where he received a BSc with Honours in Zoology and Botany in 1895. In 1899 he received a Doctorate in the same subject.

He obtained a post in Naples in Italy where his interests began to focus upon marine biology. In 1901 he became a lecturer in invertebrate zoology at the University of Edinburgh. In 1905, under his own guidance, the university began a course training for a Diploma in Tropical Medicine and Hygiene. Ashworth created the elements focussing upon entomology and parasitology. The course was extended to provide Diplomas in both Public Health and Tropical Veterinary Medicine.

In 1909, he was awarded a new chair of Professor of Invertebrate Zoology while Professor James Cossar Ewart continued as the Professor of Vertebrate Zoology. When Ewart retired in 1927 Ashworth succeeded him taking over the overarching chair of Professor of Natural History.

With financial help from the Rockefeller Foundation in 1929 he established a major new building on the university's Kings Buildings campus, thereafter known as the Ashworth Laboratories.

He died at home on Grange Loan in Edinburgh on 4 February 1936, aged 61.

== Recognition ==
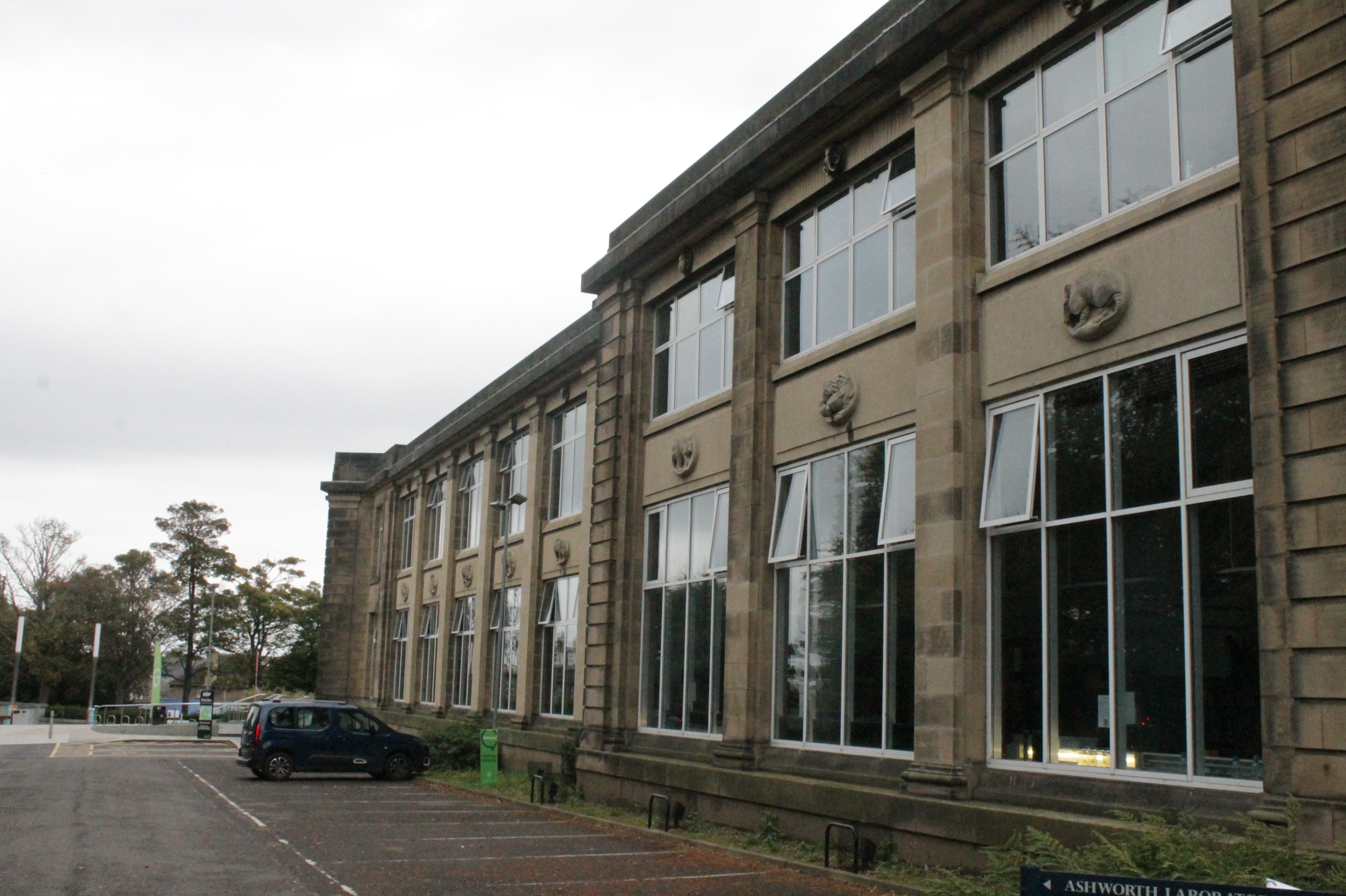
The Ashworth Building, King's Buildings

In 1911, he was elected a Fellow of the Royal Society of Edinburgh and in 1917 a Fellow of the Royal Society. The RSE awarded him its Keith Prize 1913–15. From 1923 to 1926, and again 1930 to 1933, he served as vice president to the Royal Society of Edinburgh, and from 1933 until his death in 1936 he served as their General Secretary.

The National Portrait Gallery in London hold a print (1931) of Ashworth taken by Walter Stoneman.

The Ashworth Building in Edinburgh University's King's Buildings complex is named in his honour.

== Family ==
He married Clara Hough in 1901 shortly before coming to Edinburgh.

== Publications ==
- The Giant Nerve Cells and Fibres of "Halla Parthenopeia" (1909)
