= Robert Garry =

British professor of Medicine

Robert Campbell Garry, OBE, FRSE, (21 April 1900 – 16 April 1993) was a British physician and Professor of Medicine at the University of St Andrews and the University of Glasgow. During World War II, as an expert on human physiology, he advised on human tolerance of extreme weather conditions and forces, as experienced by high altitude pilots.

== Life ==
Garry was born in Glasgow on 21 April 1900 the son of Mary Campbell and Robert Garry, both from the north-east of Scotland. His father was a biologist who was Head of Science at Glasgow High School for Girls. He was educated at Queens Park School in Glasgow. In 1917, he went to the University of Glasgow to study medicine, graduating with an MBChB in 1922. While working at the Western Infirmary in Glasgow, he was one of the first clinicians to apply the newly isolated compound, insulin, to a diabetic patient in Scotland.

In 1933, he took a role as Head of Physiology working with John Boyd Orr at the University of Aberdeen. In the autumn of 1935 he became Professor of Physiology at University College, Dundee, which was then part of the University of St Andrews. At the suggestion of Robert Percival Cook the department was later renamed the Department of Physiology and Biochemistry.

He was an active promoter of the Workers Educational Association and was one of the first high-ranking scientists to talk on the radio (from 1936) on scientific matters, raising scientific awareness with the public.

He was elected a Fellow of the Royal Society of Edinburgh in 1937. His proposers were Alexander David Peacock, Percy Theodore Herring, David Rutherford Dow and Edward Thomas Copson. He served as Vice President to the Society from 1952 to 1955. In World War II he made extensive physiological studies, especially on air crews, to assess the effects of g-forces, stress and high altitude. He contributed to the understanding of the gastrointestinal tract, and was the first to use the term 'guarding reflex' with regards to feedback signals of the nervous system.

In 1947, he moved from Dundee to the University of Glasgow, and remained there until his retirement in 1970. He retired with his wife, Flora Garry, to the village of Comrie in Perthshire.

In 1992, his former assistant, James Black, awarded him an honorary doctorate (LLD) in his capacity as Chancellor of the University of Dundee.

He died after a prolonged illness on 16 April 1993.

== Publications ==
- Dietary Requirements in Pregnancy and Lactation (1937)
- Living and Learning: An Introduction to Plant Animal and Human Biology (1939) with Alexander David Peacock
- Physiology and Biochemistry (1952)
- Life in Physiology, edited by David Smith, published by the Wellcome Unit for the History of Medicine, Glasgow University, (1992)

Garry was editor of both the Journal of Nutrition and Journal of Physiology.

== Family ==
In 1928 he married Flora MacDonald Campbell, and had one son, Frank Campbell Garry, who followed in his father's footsteps and became a doctor of medicine.
