= St Michael's Church, Inveresk =

Coordinates: 55°56′14″N 3°03′05″W

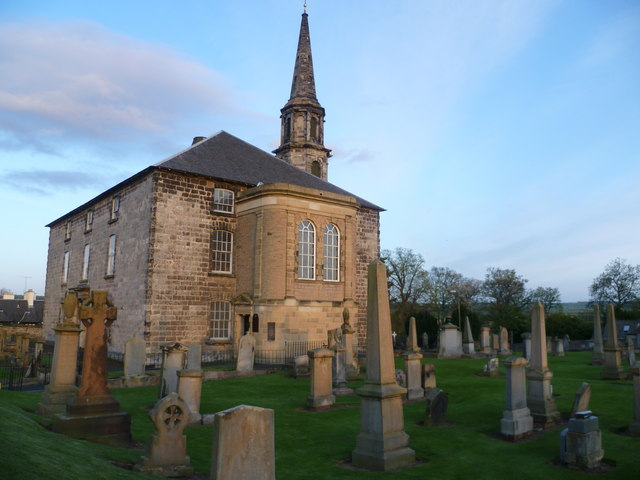
- St Michael's Church, Inveresk
- Location: Inveresk, Musselburgh
- Country: Scotland
- Denomination: Church of Scotland
- Website: https://stmichaelsinveresk.co.uk/

History
- Status: Parish church

Architecture
- Functional status: Active
- Years built: 1805

St Michael’s Church, Inveresk is a Church of Scotland church serving the parish of Musselburgh: St Michael's Inveresk, in Scotland. Known as "the Visible Kirk" because of its prominent position at the top of the hill within the historic village of Inveresk, it is a Category A listed building.

== History ==
There have been at least three churches on the site of the present church. The first was built beside the ruins of the Roman fort and is believed to have been a wooden structure which, according to legend, was built at the instigation of the Irish missionary nun Modwenna.

The second church was a medieval stone construction built sometime before 1547. Both Oliver Cromwell and Bonnie Prince Charlie commandeered the building during their respective campaigns. This building was also visited and preached in by James Wishart, who was accompanied by John Knox as part of the armed guard. By the end of the eighteenth century the size and condition of the medieval church were causing concern to the Kirk Session, so it was decided to build a new church "to prevent the people from resorting to other places of worship".

The third and present church was built in 1805 to the design of Robert Nisbet, with the steeple by William Sibbald. The interior of the church was reorientated and remodelled in 1895 to accommodate the Lewis pipe organ, which was donated by the Kirkwood family of Haddington. Further alterations were made to the church in 2002.

The church contains many stained glass windows, including the notable "God in Creation, Providence and Redemption" window, which was designed by Douglas Strachan and installed in 1923.

For four years from 1954, Mary Lusk, who, as the Rev Mary Levison, later became the first woman minister in the Church of Scotland, served as deaconess of the church.

In July 1999, the church raised over £100,000 from the sale of four 380-year old silver communion cups because it could no longer afford to store and insure them. The cups were made by craftsmen in Edinburgh and donated to the church by the Earl of Dunfermline. The money raised from the sale was used for roof repairs and mission work. One of the cups is now within the collection of the Huntly House Museum in Edinburgh.

== Ministers ==
The following have served as ministers of the church.

Minister	Period
John Burne	1562–1574
Andrew Blackhall	1574–1609
Adam Colt	1609–1641
Oliver Colt	1641–1679
Arthur Miller	1680–1690
Richard Howieson	1690–1701
John Williamson	1701–1739
Frederick Carmichael	1740–1747
Alexander "Jupiter" Carlyle	1748–1805
Leslie Moodie	1806–1840
John Beveridge	1840–1886
Alexander Marshall	1887–1888
James Sharp	1888–1905
James Wallace	1906–1906
George Duncan	1907–1910
Willian Eadie	1910–1936
David Stiven	1937–1958
Sidney Adamson	1959–1985
Alexander Strachan	1985–1999
Andrew Dick	1999–2015
Malcolm Lyon	2017–

== Graveyard ==
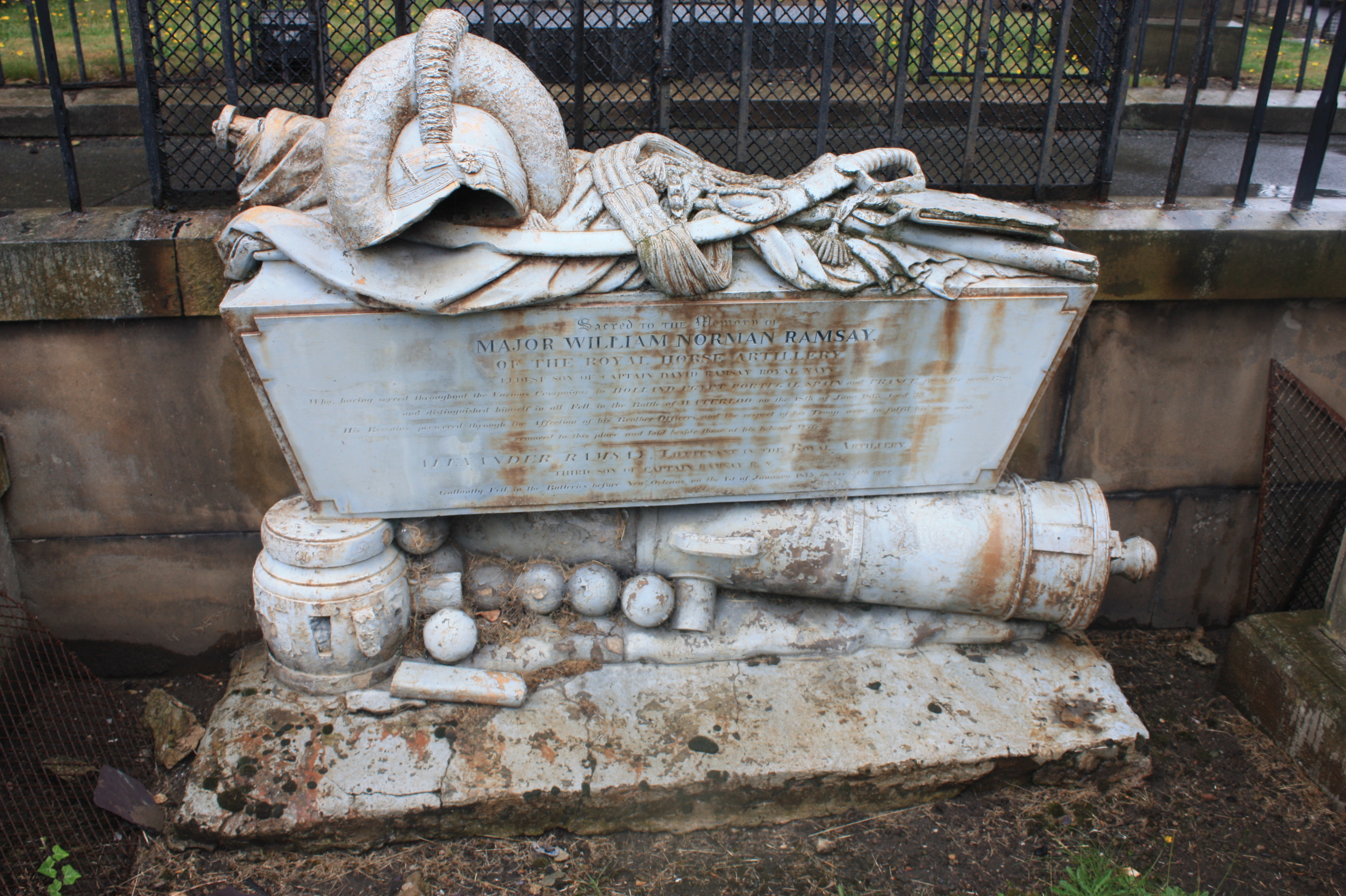
The grave of Major William Norman Ramsay

The church is surrounded by a large graveyard that extends westwards for almost 300m and is split into separate walled sections, marking its various stages of extension. These sections can broadly be categorised as original (mainly 18th century), a late Victorian extension, an Edwardian/ early 20th century extension to the north, and a modern section to the far west.

The graveyard is owned and maintained by East Lothian Council.

=== Noteworthy graves ===
The graveyard contains many noteworthy graves, including those of the following:

- Edwin Alexander RSA RSW (1870-1926) artist, son of the artist Robert Alexander
- William Lindsay Alexander FRSE (1808-1884) theologian
- John Brunton (manufacturer) (1837-1917) specialist wire-maker whose family financed the Brunton Theatre
- A white-painted, cast-iron sculpture of a coffin draped in military regalia, atop a full-sized cannon and cannon-balls, just south of the church marking the grave of Major William Norman Ramsay of Waterloo fame (see Order of battle of the Waterloo Campaign)
- A monument to 7 fishermen from Fisherrow of the fishing-boat "Alice" from Boddam, Aberdeenshire, lost in the storm of 14 October 1881 (generally referred to as the Eyemouth Disaster).
- Very Rev Alexander Carlyle (1722–1805)
- Curious cubic gravestones to Admiral Archibald Cochran (d.1843) and his son Admiral Thomas Cochran (d.1888)
- Rev William Lindsay Alexander (1808–1884)
- John Cran, shipbuilder (1849–1940)
- Sir Charles Dalrymple, 1st Baronet
- Mark Dalrymple, 3rd Baronet (1915–1971)
- Sir Charles Dalrymple Fergusson, 5th Baronet
- The Buller-Elphinstone tomb: William Elphinstone, 15th Lord Elphinstone, Sidney Elphinstone, 16th Lord Elphinstone (a sarcophagus-style monument at the east end of the Victorian section)
- James Greenlees (1870–1951) rugby player and scholar, headmaster of Loretto College 1926-41 (a stone on the west wall of the Victorian section)
- A large monument to several of Hope Baronets of Craighall (against the far east wall), including Sir Archibald Hope, 9th Baronet
- Major General Sir Patrick Lindesay (1778–1839), military hero, Acting Governor of New South Wales in 1831 (stone fully obscured by yew trees)
- John Grieve: John Grieve was awarded the Victoria Cross for his bravery at the Battle of Balaclava in the Crimean War.
- Admiral Sir David Milne 1763–1845, his son Admiral Sir Alexander Milne 1806-1896 and his geologist son David Milne-Home 1805-1890
- David Rae, Lord Eskgrove (1724–1804) (on the outer south-west corner of the church)
- Sir William Rae, 3rd Baronet (1769–1842) son of the above, buried with his father
- Pte Alexander Sinclair (1896–1915), a survivor of the Quintinshill rail disaster near Gretna Green, the worst rail disaster in British history, killed at Gallipoli a few months later
- Major Robert Vernor (d.1827) wounded whilst a Captain of the Scots Greys at the Battle of Waterloo
- Alexander Handyside Ritchie sculptor (1804–1870)
- The Wedderburn tomb: Sir David Wedderburn, 1st Baronet (1775–1858), Sir John Wedderburn, 2nd Baronet, Sir David Wedderburn, 3rd Baronet (1835–1882)
