= List of listed buildings in Inveresk, East Lothian =

This is a list of listed buildings in the parish of Inveresk in East Lothian, Scotland.

== List ==
Name	Location	Date Listed	Grid Ref. (Note: Sometimes known as OSGB36, the grid reference (where provided) is based on the British national grid reference system used by the Ordnance Survey. • "Guide to National Grid". Ordnance Survey. • "Get-a-map". Ordnance Survey.)	Geo-coordinates	Notes	LB Number (Note: Historic Environment Scotland assign a unique alphanumeric identifier to each designated site in Scotland, for listed buildings this always begins with "LB", for example "LB12345".)	Image
45 Inveresk Village, Shepherd House With Retaining Walls, Gatepiers And Gates				55°56′06″N 3°02′34″W	Category B	10932	Upload Photo
24 Inveresk Village, Inveresk Lodge With Sundial, Former Outbuilding, Retaining And Terrace Walls				55°56′06″N 3°02′38″W	Category A	10938	Upload another image See more images
Inveresk Village, Crookston Road, Pinkiehill House With Quadrants, Gates And Railings				55°56′03″N 3°02′26″W	Category B	10939	Upload Photo
Carberry Tower, Game Larder				55°54′59″N 3°01′14″W	Category B	10870	Upload Photo
Carberry Tower Stables (Elphinstone Wing)				55°55′00″N 3°01′07″W	Category B	10874	Upload Photo
Chalkieside Farmhouse				55°54′23″N 3°00′43″W	Category C(S)	10876	Upload Photo
Cowpits, The Old Schoolhouse With Retaining Wall				55°55′33″N 3°02′32″W	Category B	10877	Upload Photo
3 Inveresk Village, Inveresk House And Linden House With Garden Walls, Gatepiers And Gateway				55°56′15″N 3°02′56″W	Category B	10881	Upload Photo
Inveresk Village, Eskhill Lodge With Gatepiers				55°56′12″N 3°02′43″W	Category B	10885	Upload Photo
Newhailes House, Gardener's Cottage				55°56′24″N 3°04′55″W	Category C(S)	10914	Upload Photo
Newhailes House, Stables				55°56′24″N 3°04′53″W	Category A	10916	Upload Photo
Smeaton, Shepherd's Cottage, Stable Court				55°55′09″N 3°03′20″W	Category C(S)	10926	Upload Photo
25 Inveresk Village, Rose Court With Garden Walls And Gate				55°56′10″N 3°02′39″W	Category B	10930	Upload Photo
14 Inveresk Village, Oak Lodge With Terrace And Retaining Walls And Gatepiers				55°56′11″N 3°02′46″W	Category B	10934	Upload Photo
18 Inveresk Village, The Manor House, North Pavilion				55°56′10″N 3°02′42″W	Category B	10936	Upload another image
Inveresk Village, 27 And 29 Inveresk Village Road				55°56′09″N 3°02′38″W	Category B	10941	Upload Photo
Inveresk Village, Pinkiehill Steading And Stalk				55°56′03″N 3°02′31″W	Category B	10945	Upload Photo
Carberry Tower, Main Gate (Lodge And Archway) With Quadrants, Retaining Walls And Gates				55°54′37″N 3°00′39″W	Category B	10871	Upload Photo
Carberry Tower, North Lodge Quadrants And Retaining Walls				55°55′03″N 3°01′37″W	Category C(S)	10872	Upload Photo
Castlesteads Dovecot				55°55′02″N 3°03′47″W	Category B	10875	Upload Photo
5 Inveresk Village, Eskgrove House With Dovecot, Gatepiers And Retaining Walls				55°56′16″N 3°02′51″W	Category B	10882	Upload Photo
19 Inveresk Village, Catherine Lodge With Stable Block, Retaining Walls And Gatepiers				55°56′11″N 3°02′38″W	Category A	10886	Upload Photo
Newhailes House, Walled Garden, Walled Flower Garden, Fruit Store, Tea House, Ice House And Terraced Walk				55°56′41″N 3°04′54″W	Category B	13038	Upload Photo
Smeaton Home Farm, Cottages				55°54′58″N 3°02′46″W	Category C(S)	10923	Upload Photo
Smeaton House (Known As Smeaton Home Farm) With Garden Walls				55°54′57″N 3°02′42″W	Category B	10924	Upload Photo
Smeaton, Shepherd's Cottage				55°55′09″N 3°03′20″W	Category C(S)	10925	Upload Photo
6 Inveresk Village, Inveresk Research International (Formerly Inveresk Gate) With Gatepiers				55°56′13″N 3°02′54″W	Category C(S)	10933	Upload Photo
22 Inveresk Village Halkerston Lodge With Former Stables, Lamp Standards, Terrace And Retaining Walls				55°56′08″N 3°02′40″W	Category A	10937	Upload Photo
Barbachlaw Farmhouse With Garden Walls				55°56′06″N 3°01′15″W	Category C(S)	10865	Upload Photo
Carberry Gardens				55°55′06″N 3°00′55″W	Category C(S)	10866	Upload Photo
Crookston Farmhouse With Retaining Walls				55°55′35″N 3°01′16″W	Category C(S)	10878	Upload Photo
23 Inveresk Village, Rosehill With Retaining Walls, Gate And Railings				55°56′09″N 3°02′38″W	Category B	10887	Upload Photo
Springfield, Glamis Cottage With Railings				55°54′38″N 3°01′03″W	Category C(S)	10927	Upload Photo
41 Inveresk Village, Whitehouse And Easter Whitehouse With Retaining Walls, Gatepiers, Gates And Railings				55°56′07″N 3°02′35″W	Category B	10931	Upload Photo
Inveresk Village, 11 And 12 Crookston Road With Retaining Wall				55°56′06″N 3°02′31″W	Category C(S)	10940	Upload Photo
Inveresk Village, 35 Inveresk Village Road				55°56′08″N 3°02′36″W	Category B	10943	Upload Photo
Inveresk Village, 1 And 2 Smeaton Grove With Gateways And Retaining Walls				55°55′58″N 3°02′33″W	Category B	10947	Upload Photo
Carberry Tower With Terraces And Sundial				55°54′56″N 3°01′14″W	Category B	10869	Upload Photo
Edenhall Hospital, (Formerly Pinkieburn House), Edenhall Road, Musselburgh, Including Former Stable Block, Sundial And Ornamental Garden Walls And Railings				55°56′11″N 3°02′12″W	Category C(S)	50838	Upload Photo
Old Craighall, Monkton House With Stable Range, Retaining Walls, Gates And Gatepiers				55°55′16″N 3°04′03″W	Category A	10919	Upload Photo
18 Inveresk Village, The Manor House With South Pavilion, Dovecot, Ice House, Retaining Walls, Gates And Gatepiers				55°56′09″N 3°02′41″W	Category A	10935	Upload Photo
Inveresk Village, Pinkiehill Farmhouse				55°56′04″N 3°02′33″W	Category B	10946	Upload Photo
Monktonhall Golf Club House And Fountain				55°55′50″N 3°03′31″W	Category B	10948	Upload Photo
Newhailes House, Dovecot				55°56′25″N 3°04′54″W	Category B	10913	Upload Photo
Newhailes House, Shell Grotto				55°56′33″N 3°04′54″W	Category B	10915	Upload Photo
Smeaton Bridge				55°54′56″N 3°03′01″W	Category B	10920	Upload Photo
Smeaton Home Farm, Stable And Hayloft, Cartshed And Granary, And Former Abattoir				55°54′50″N 3°02′22″W	Category B	10922	Upload Photo
Inveresk Village, 37 And 39 Inveresk Village Road (Double Dykes), The Laigh House				55°56′08″N 3°02′36″W	Category B	10944	Upload Photo
Carberry Road, Sweethope Hotel With Retaining Wall And Gateway				55°55′32″N 3°02′06″W	Category B	10868	Upload Photo
Inveresk Village, Eskgrove Lodge				55°56′13″N 3°02′46″W	Category C(S)	10883	Upload Photo
Newhailes House With Gatepiers				55°56′27″N 3°04′45″W	Category A	10911	Upload another image
Newhailes House, Earl Of Stair Monument				55°56′33″N 3°04′51″W	Category B	10912	Upload Photo
Newhailes Road, Newhailes House Gatepiers, Gates, Quadrants, Railings And Policy Walls				55°56′20″N 3°04′46″W	Category B	10917	Upload Photo
Old Craighall, Monkton Gardens With Sundial And Garden Walls				55°55′20″N 3°04′02″W	Category B	10918	Upload Photo
Springfield, Pentlands View				55°54′40″N 3°00′54″W	Category C(S)	10928	Upload Photo
Springfield, Strathmore Cottage With Railings				55°54′38″N 3°01′04″W	Category C(S)	10929	Upload Photo
Edenhall Hospital, Former Gardener's Cottage				55°56′09″N 3°02′17″W	Category C(S)	10879	Upload Photo
Inveresk Village, St Michael's Kirk (Church Of Scotland) With Graveyard Walls, Railings And Piers				55°56′14″N 3°03′04″W	Category A	10880	Upload another image See more images
Smeaton Gate Lodge, Gatepiers And Screen Walls				55°54′52″N 3°02′36″W	Category B	10921	Upload Photo
Inveresk Village, 31 And 33 Inveresk Village Road				55°56′08″N 3°02′37″W	Category B	10942	Upload Photo
Carberry House				55°55′06″N 3°00′53″W	Category B	10867	Upload Photo
Carberry Tower, South Lodge With Quadrants, Railings, Gates And Gatepiers				55°54′37″N 3°00′39″W	Category B	10873	Upload Photo
15 And 17 Inveresk Village, Eskhill With Dovecot, Wellhead, Gatepiers, Railings And Retaining Walls				55°56′12″N 3°02′44″W	Category B	10884	Upload Photo

== Key ==
The scheme for classifying buildings in Scotland is:

- Category A: "buildings of national or international importance, either architectural or historic; or fine, little-altered examples of some particular period, style or building type."
- Category B: "buildings of regional or more than local importance; or major examples of some particular period, style or building type, which may have been altered."
- Category C: "buildings of local importance; lesser examples of any period, style, or building type, as originally constructed or moderately altered; and simple traditional buildings which group well with other listed buildings."

In March 2016 there were 47,288 listed buildings in Scotland. Of these, 8% were Category A, and 50% were Category B, with the remaining 42% being Category C.

== See also ==
- List of listed buildings in East Lothian
