= Manor House, Inveresk =

Category B listed house in Inveresk, Scotland

Manor House
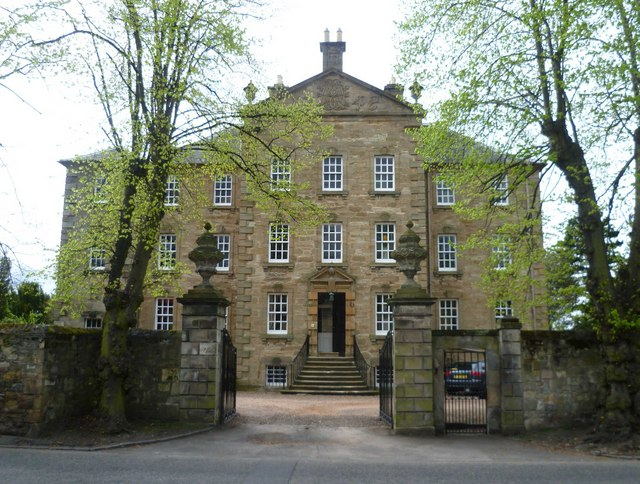
- The building in 2011
- Interactive map of the Manor House area

General information
- Location: Inveresk, East Lothian, Scotland
- Coordinates: 55.93699°N 3.0489°W
- Completed: 1748 (278 years ago)

Technical details
- Floor count: 3

Manor House is a Category B listed manor house in the Scottish village of Inveresk, East Lothian. It dates to 1748, and it received its historic designation in 1971. The house was built for Archibald Shiells.

== See also ==
- List of listed buildings in Inveresk, East Lothian
