= Euphemia Johnston =

- Born: Euphemia Alexander; 1 March 1824; Inveresk, Scotland
- Occupation: Lady's nurse
- Known for: Attended Princess Christian, the daughter of Queen Victoria, at the birth of her first child in 1867.
- Spouse: Alexander Johnston (m. 1844–1851)
- Children: 3 daughters

Euphemia Alexander Johnston (born 1 March 1824) was a Scottish Lady's nurse who attended Princess Helena, the daughter of Queen Victoria, at the birth of her first child in 1867.

== Biography ==
Johnston was born Euphemia Alexander in Inveresk to Jean Brackenridge and James Alexander. She was the eldest of six children. She married Alexander Johnston in Edinburgh in June 1844. They had three daughters. She became a widow by 1851, and lived with her aunt and her children in Edinburgh thereafter.

== Career ==
She met Professor James Simpson, possibly whilst a pupil midwife at the Maternity hospital in Edinburgh, and Simpson recommended her to Princess Helena, daughter of Queen Victoria, for the birth of her first child..
