= Inveresk =

Conservation village in East Lothian, Scotland

Coordinates: 55.937°N 3.047°W

Inveresk: Scottish Gaelic: Inbhir Easg
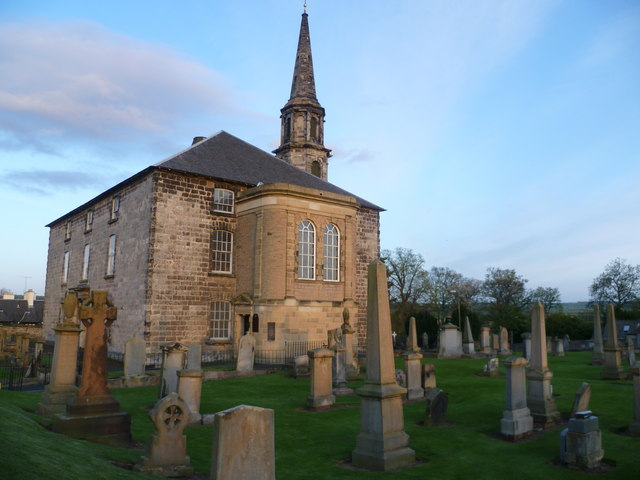
- St Michael's Parish Church, Inveresk

- Location within Scotland
- OS grid reference: NT346719
- Council area: East Lothian Council
- Lieutenancy area: East Lothian
- Country: Scotland
- Sovereign state: United Kingdom
- Post town: MUSSELBURGH
- Postcode district: EH21
- Dialling code: 0131
- Police: Scotland
- Fire: Scottish
- Ambulance: Scottish
- UK Parliament: East Lothian
- Scottish Parliament: East Lothian

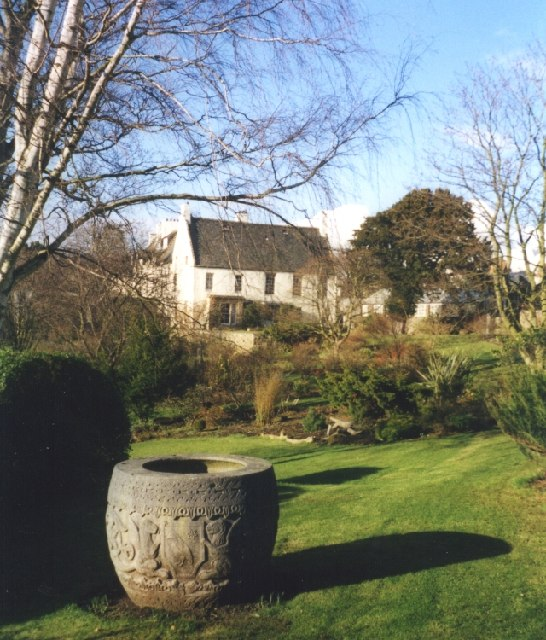
Inveresk Lodge Garden

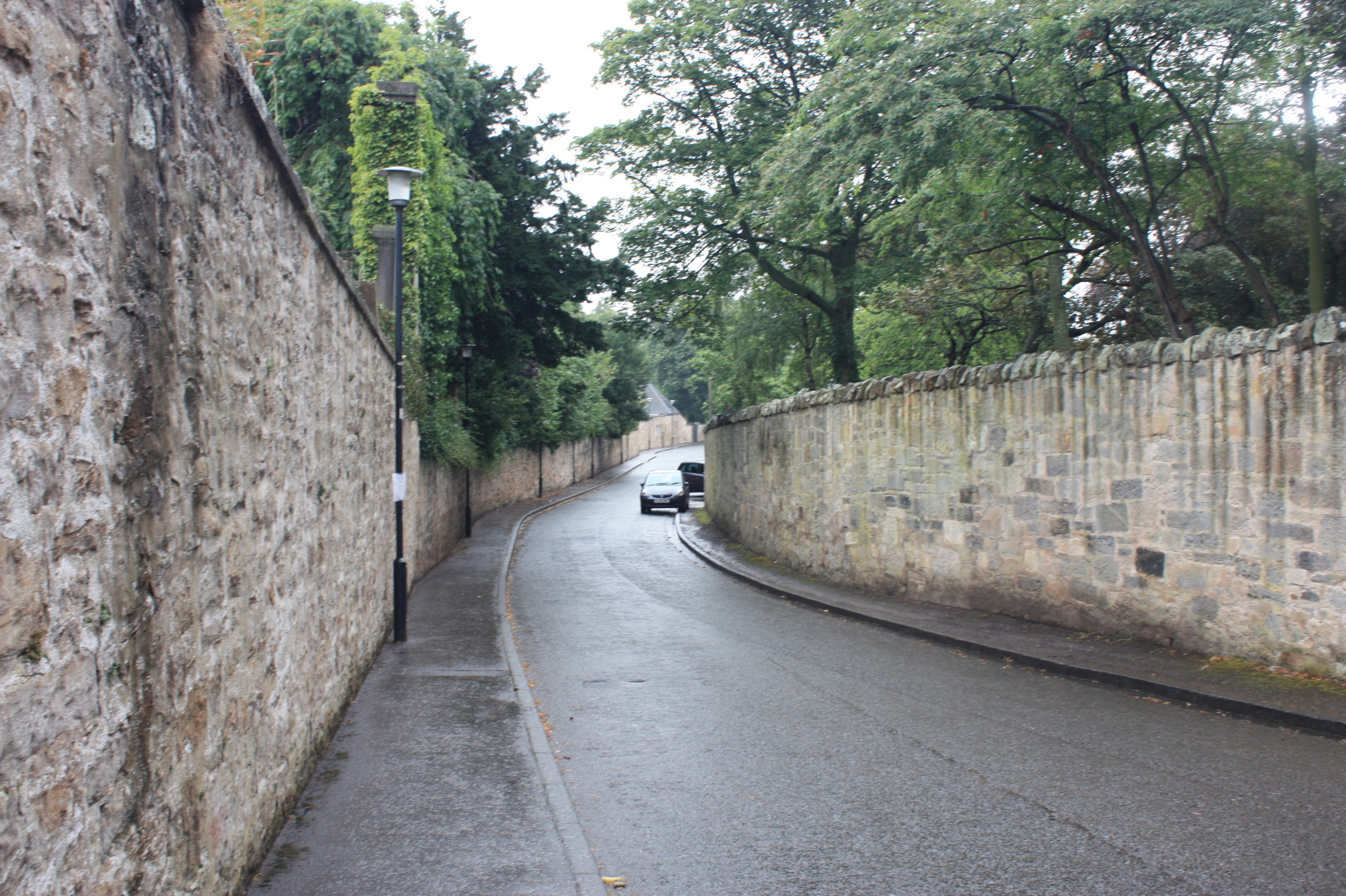
The western section of Inveresk Village is typified by high stone walls and mansion-houses screened by trees

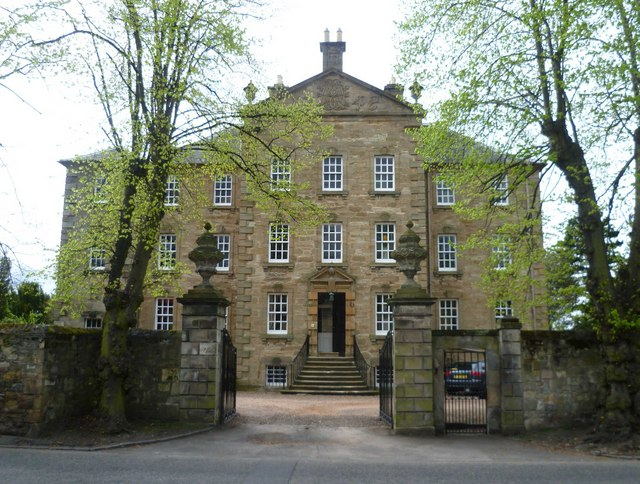
Manor House, a typical mansion in Inveresk village

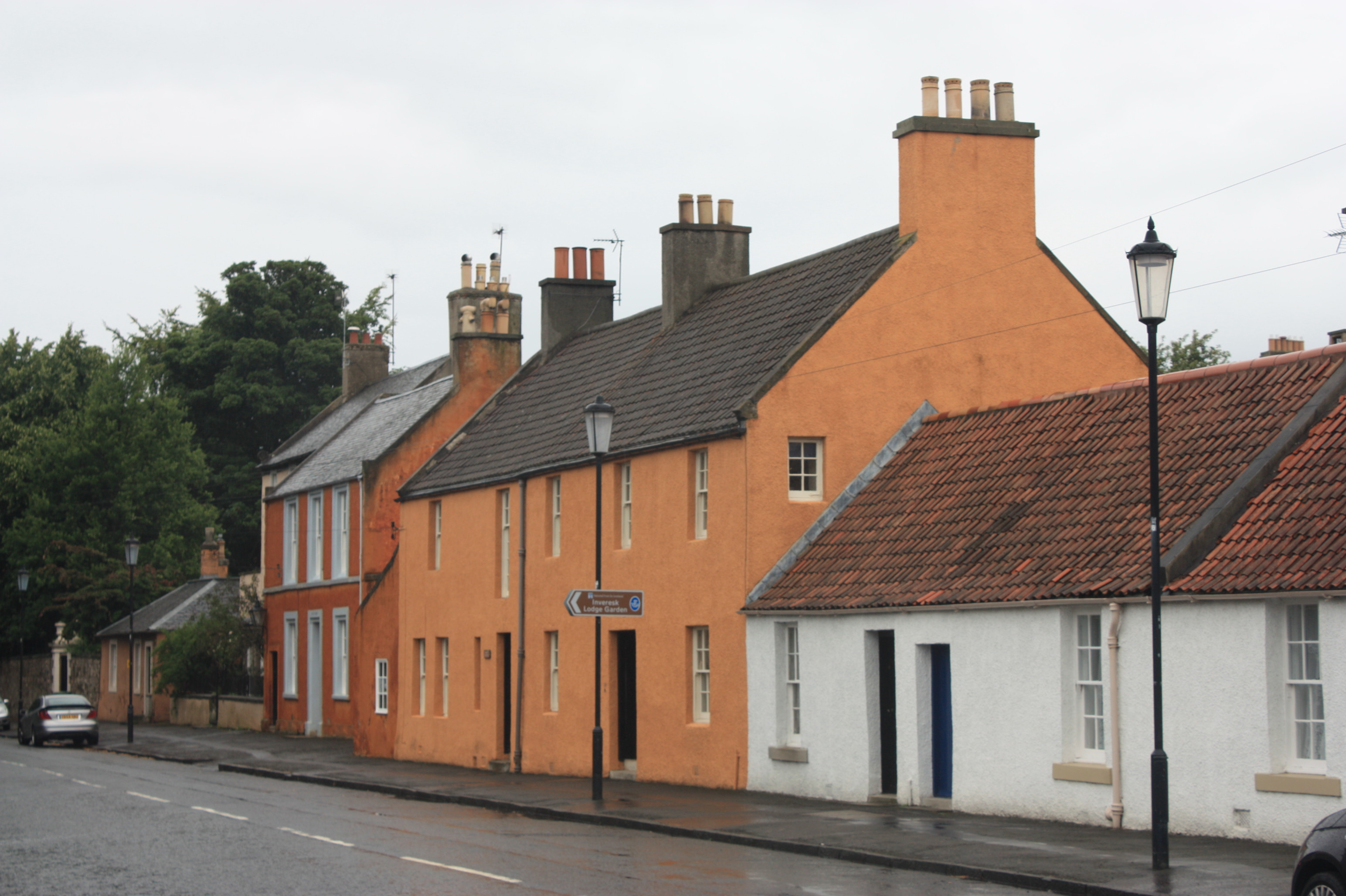
Typical 18th-century houses at the east end of Inveresk village

Inveresk (Gaelic: Inbhir Easg) is a village in East Lothian, Scotland situated 5/8 mi (1 km) to the south of Musselburgh. It has been designated a conservation area since 1969. It is situated on slightly elevated ground on the north bank of a loop of the River Esk. This ridge of ground, 20 to 25 metres above sea level, was used by the Romans as the location for Inveresk Roman Fort in the 2nd century AD.

The prefix "Inver" (Gaelic inbhir) means a river mouth and refers to the point where the River Esk meets the Firth of Forth.

The village was formerly in the Midlothian parish of Inveresk and developed separately from the burgh of Musselburgh.

== History ==
A Roman cavalry fort sat on the hilltop around 200AD and numerous Roman artefacts and buildings have been found in the village over the years. In 2004, archaeological excavations by Headland Archaeology found Roman artefacts on Inveresk Brae.

The lands were gifted to Dunfermline Abbey in the 12th century. During the war known as the Rough Wooing, in September 1547, the Battle of Pinkie took place in and around Inveresk, and in 1549 an artillery fort was built at Inveresk.

Inveresk centres on a street of fine 17th- and 18th-century houses. Its location being thought to be agreeable and healthy earned for the village the name of the Montpellier of Scotland.

Inveresk Lodge (1683) is now privately leased, but the adjacent Inveresk Lodge Garden belongs to the National Trust for Scotland, and its west facing gardens overlooking the river Esk are open to the public. This was formerly the mansion of James Wedderburn who had made his fortune as a slave-owning sugar plantation owner in Jamaica. When his son by one of his slaves, Robert Wedderburn, travelled to Inveresk to claim his kinship, while his father did not deny him to be his son, he "called me a lazy fellow, and said he would do nothing for me. From his cook I had one draught of small beer, and his footman gave me a cracked sixpence". This experience turned Robert Wedderburn to radicalism.

Halkerstoun dates from around 1690. The Manor House was built in 1748 for Archibald Shiells. Catherine Lodge built in 1709 for Alexander Christie. Eskhill was owned by Thomas Mylne in 1710 and incorporates a finely carved 1760 doorpiece moved from a demolition in George Square, Edinburgh in the 1970s. Oak Lodge dates from c.1720, Eskgrove House from around 1750. Inveresk House is one of the oldest in the group dating from at least 1643, and Inveresk Gates dates from 1773.

The war memorial, south of the church, was designed by Sir Robert Lorimer in 1920.

=== Roman remains ===
In 2010, an archaeological dig in Lewisvale Park found two well-preserved Roman altars, which were acquired by the National Museum of Scotland in 2016. The altars are believed to be from the Roman Empire's most northerly temple dedicated to cult of Mithras, a faith popular among Roman soldiers.

Likely once part of an underground Mithraic sanctuary, one of the stones has a carving of the face of the sun god, Sol, with pierced eyes, mouth and a glowing solar crown. The other depicts Mithras himself, with carvings of the god Apollo. The altar stones have undergone extensive conservation, and are due to go on display as part of a special exhibition at the National Museum of Scotland between November 2026 and April 2027.

== St. Michael's Church ==
The church site predates the Reformation and originally belonged to the Abbey of Dunfermline. From 1560 it came under the Presbytery of Edinburgh but in 1591 transferred permanently to the control of the Presbytery of Dalkeith.

The village is dominated by St. Michael's church that stands at its west end on the summit of a hill overlooking Musselburgh. Its graveyard/cemetery stretches westwards for almost 300m and is split into separate walled sections (marking its various stages of extension) which can be broadly bracketed as original (mainly 18th century), a late Victorian extension, an Edwardian/ early 20th century extension to the north, and a modern section to the far west.

The current church is by Robert Nisbet and dates to 1805 and has a stone spire of Wren-influence.

=== Noteworthy graves ===
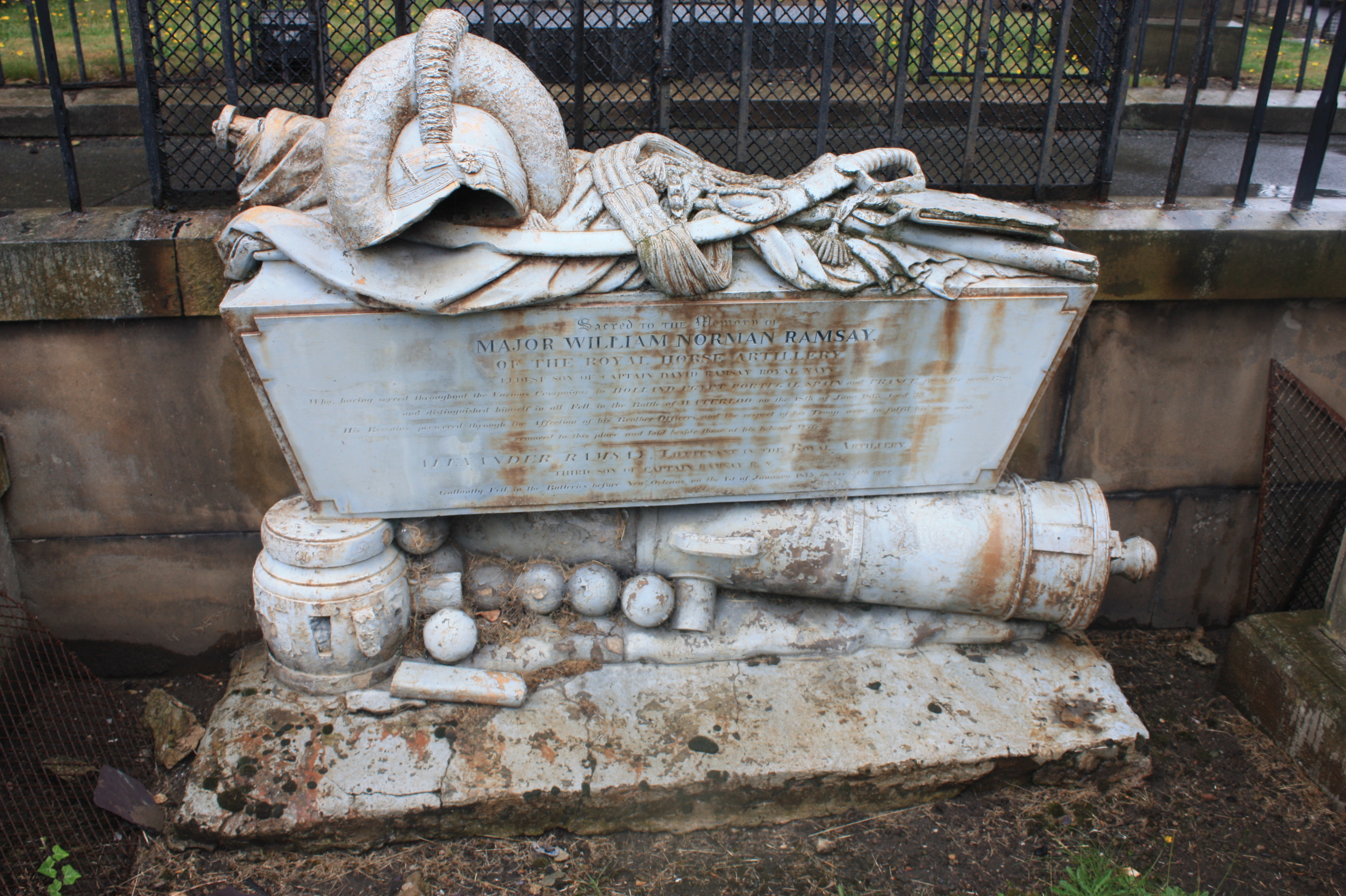
Grave of Major William Norman Ramsay in St Michael's churchyard

The graveyard has a number of notable graves:

- Edwin Alexander RSA RSW (1870–1926) artist, son of the artist Robert Alexander
- William Lindsay Alexander FRSE (1808–1884) theologian
- John Brunton (manufacturer) (1837–1917) specialist wire-maker whose family financed the Brunton Theatre
- A white-painted, cast-iron sculpture of a coffin draped in military regalia, atop a full-sized cannon and cannon-balls, just south of the church marking the grave of Major William Norman Ramsay of Waterloo fame (see separate article Order of battle of the Waterloo Campaign)
- A monument to 7 fishermen from Fisherrow of the fishing-boat "Alice" from Boddam, Aberdeenshire, lost in the storm of 14 October 1881 (generally referred to as the Eyemouth Disaster).
- Very Rev Alexander Carlyle (1722–1805)
- Curious cubic gravestones to Admiral Archibald Cochran (d.1843) and his son Admiral Thomas Cochran (d.1888)
- John Cran, shipbuilder (1849–1940)
- Sir Charles Dalrymple, 1st Baronet
- Mark Dalrymple, 3rd Baronet (1915–1971)
- Sir Charles Dalrymple Fergusson, 5th Baronet
- The Buller-Elphinstone tomb: William Elphinstone, 15th Lord Elphinstone, Sidney Elphinstone, 16th Lord Elphinstone (a sarcophagus-style monument at the east end of the Victorian section)
- James Greenlees (1870–1951) rugby player and scholar, headmaster of Loretto College 1926-41 (a stone on the west wall of the Victorian section)
- A large monument to several of Hope Baronets of Craighall (against the far east wall), including Sir Archibald Hope, 9th Baronet
- Major General Sir Patrick Lindesay (1778–1839), military hero, Acting Governor of New South Wales in 1831 (stone fully obscured by yew trees)
- John Grieve: John Grieve was awarded the Victoria Cross for his bravery at the Battle of Balaclava in the Crimean War.
- Admiral Sir David Milne 1763–1845, his son Admiral Sir Alexander Milne 1806-1896 and his geologist son David Milne-Home 1805-1890
- Willie Park Jr. 1864-1925, famed golfer and two-time Open champion, as well as his father Willie Park Sr. 1833-1903, himself a four-time and the inaugural Open champion. Also buried in the cemetery is Park Jr.'s longtime caddie, John "Fiery" Carey
- David Rae, Lord Eskgrove (1724–1804) (on the outer south-west corner of the church)
- Sir William Rae, 3rd Baronet (1769–1842) son of the above, buried with his father
- Pte Alexander Sinclair (1896–1915), a survivor of the Quintinshill rail disaster near Gretna Green, the worst rail disaster in British history, killed at Gallipoli a few months later
- Major Robert Vernor (d.1827) wounded whilst a Captain of the Scots Greys at the Battle of Waterloo
- Alexander Handyside Ritchie sculptor (1804–1870)
- The Wedderburn tomb: Sir David Wedderburn, 1st Baronet (1775–1858), Sir John Wedderburn, 2nd Baronet, Sir David Wedderburn, 3rd Baronet (1835–1882)

== Other notable persons linked to Inveresk ==
- Euphemia Johnston (born 1824), Scottish nurse, born here
- Mary Levison served as Deaconess in St Michael's Church in Inveresk from 1954, and was the first person to petition the Church of Scotland for the ordination of women to the Ministry of Word and Sacrament in 1963.
- James Murray, 2nd Duke of Atholl, buried here.
- Robert Mylne, architect/master mason, 1633–1710, lived and died here
- Mungo Park, famed golfer, died in the poor house here in 1904
- Clarissa Dickson Wright the chef and broadcaster lived here until her death in March 2014.
- Henry Yule (1820–1899), Scottish Orientalist, born here
