= Fisherrow =

Coordinates: 55.945595°N 3.0643165°W

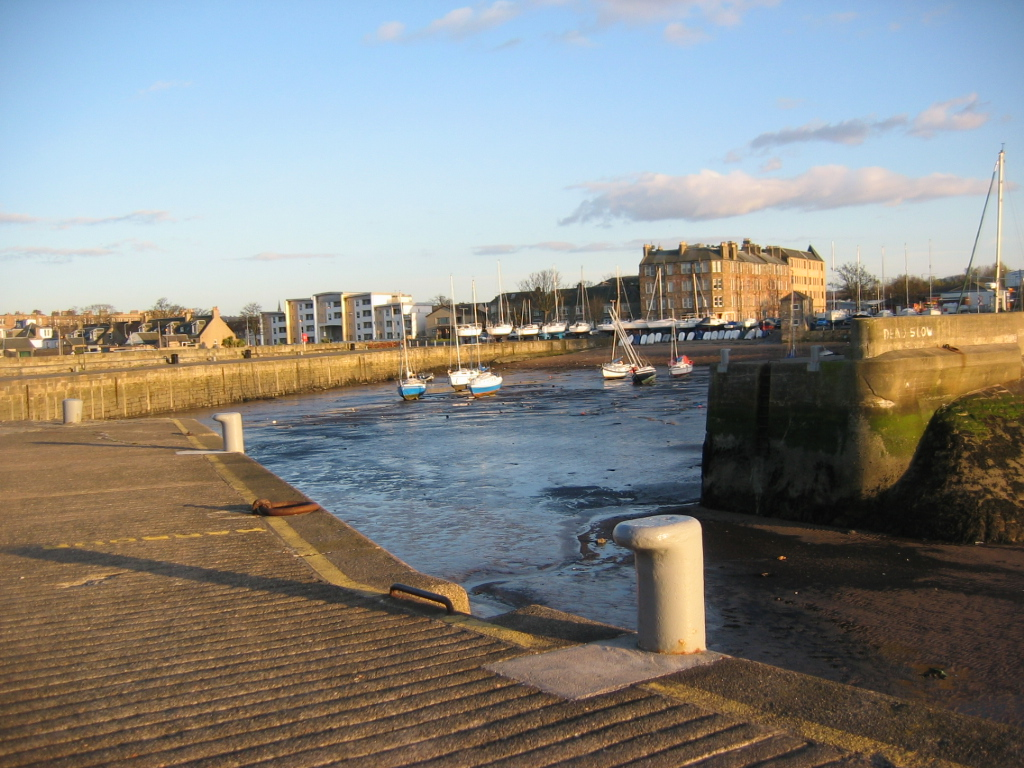
- Fisherrow Harbour at low tide

- Location within East Lothian
- OS grid reference: NT333730
- Council area: East Lothian
- Lieutenancy area: East Lothian
- Country: Scotland
- Sovereign state: United Kingdom
- Post town: MUSSELBURGH
- Postcode district: EH21
- Dialling code: 0131
- Police: Scotland
- Fire: Scottish
- Ambulance: Scottish
- UK Parliament: Edinburgh East and Musselburgh
- Scottish Parliament: Edinburgh Eastern, Musselburgh and Tranent

Fisherrow is a harbour and former fishing village at Musselburgh, East Lothian, Scotland, to the east of Portobello and Joppa, and west of the River Esk.

== History ==
There has been fishing at Fisherrow and Musselburgh since Roman times, and the present 17th-century harbour is very close to the Roman harbour at the mouth of the River Esk that served the Inveresk Roman Fort on the high ground east of the Esk upriver. The Fisherrow fishermen used to fish for herring, and later for white fish, prawns and sprats. The harbour was home to a large fishing fleet.

Fishing villages were close-knit communities, and there was a Fishwives' Choir, and golf tournaments took place between the fishwives of Musselburgh and Fisherrow. Fishermen and fishwives held a "Box Walk" each September which marked the end of the fishing season, and an opportunity to give presents of money to those in need. The Annual Reports of the Fishery Board for Scotland provide an insight into fishing in Fisherrow in the years before the First World War. In the report for 1914 it was stated that "home fishing [was] relatively unimportant. Income [was] derived prinicpally from herring fishing at the principal Scottish and English centres.

Fishery Statistics

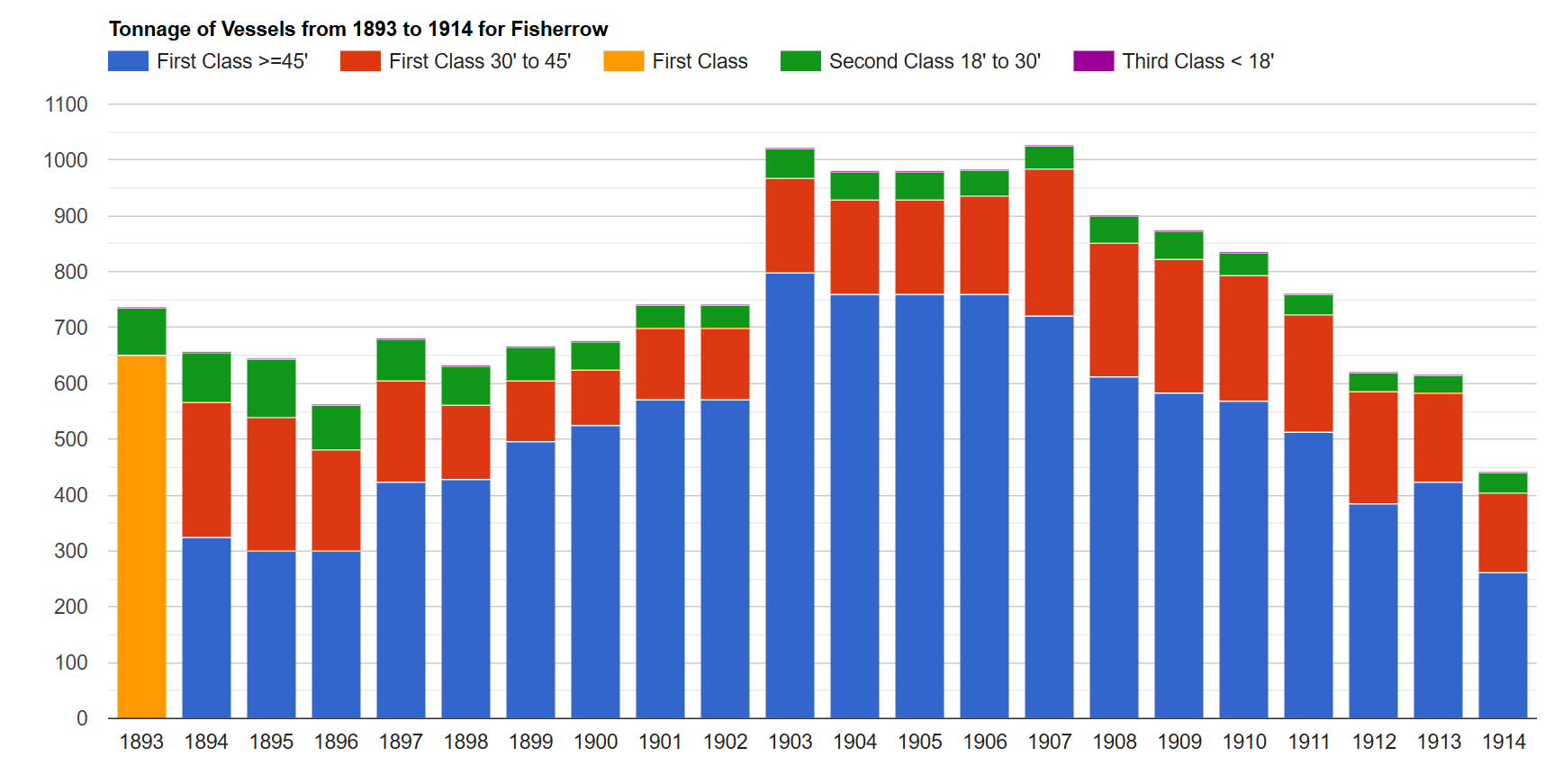
Tonnage of vessels

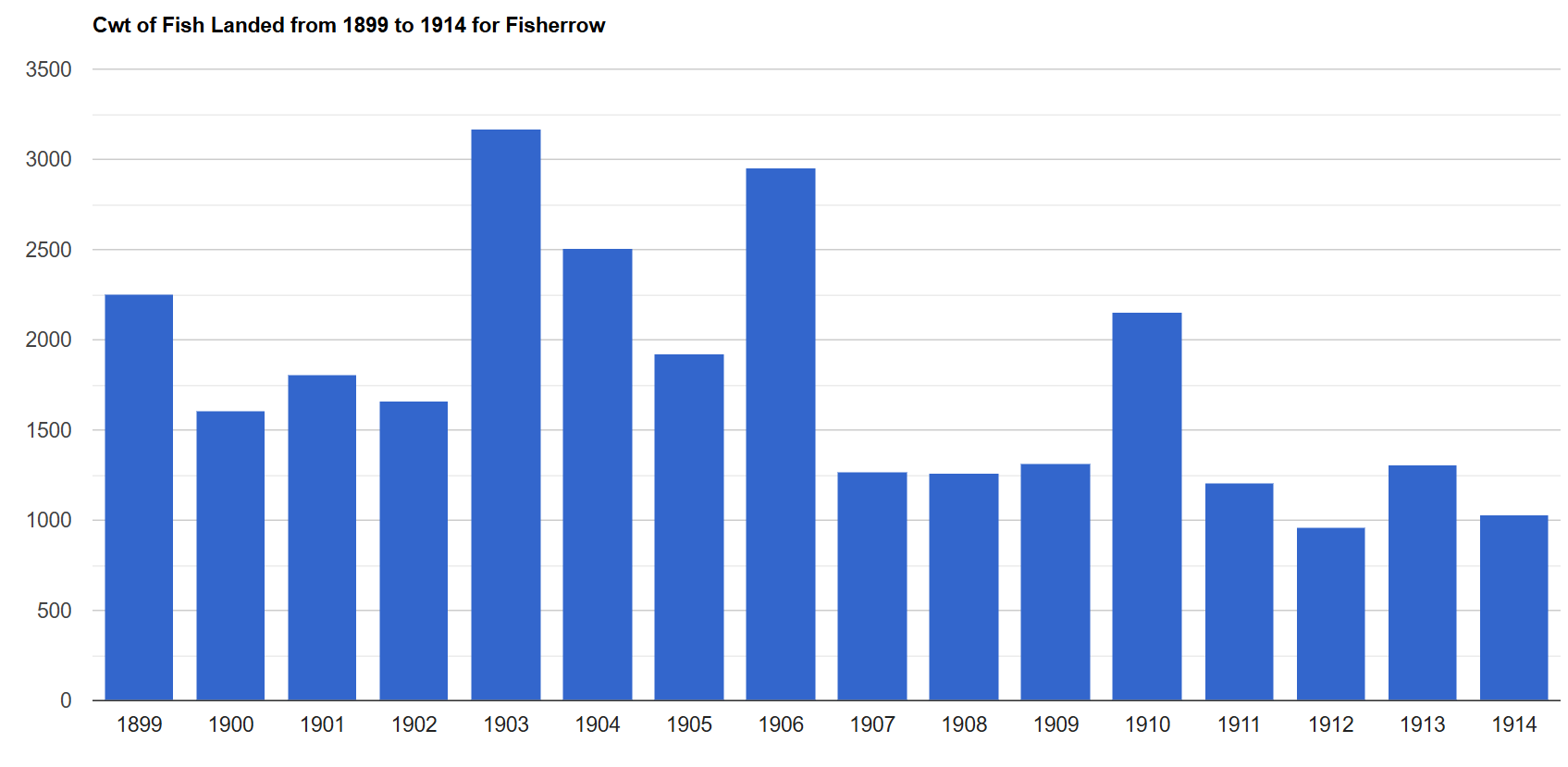
Cwt of fish landed

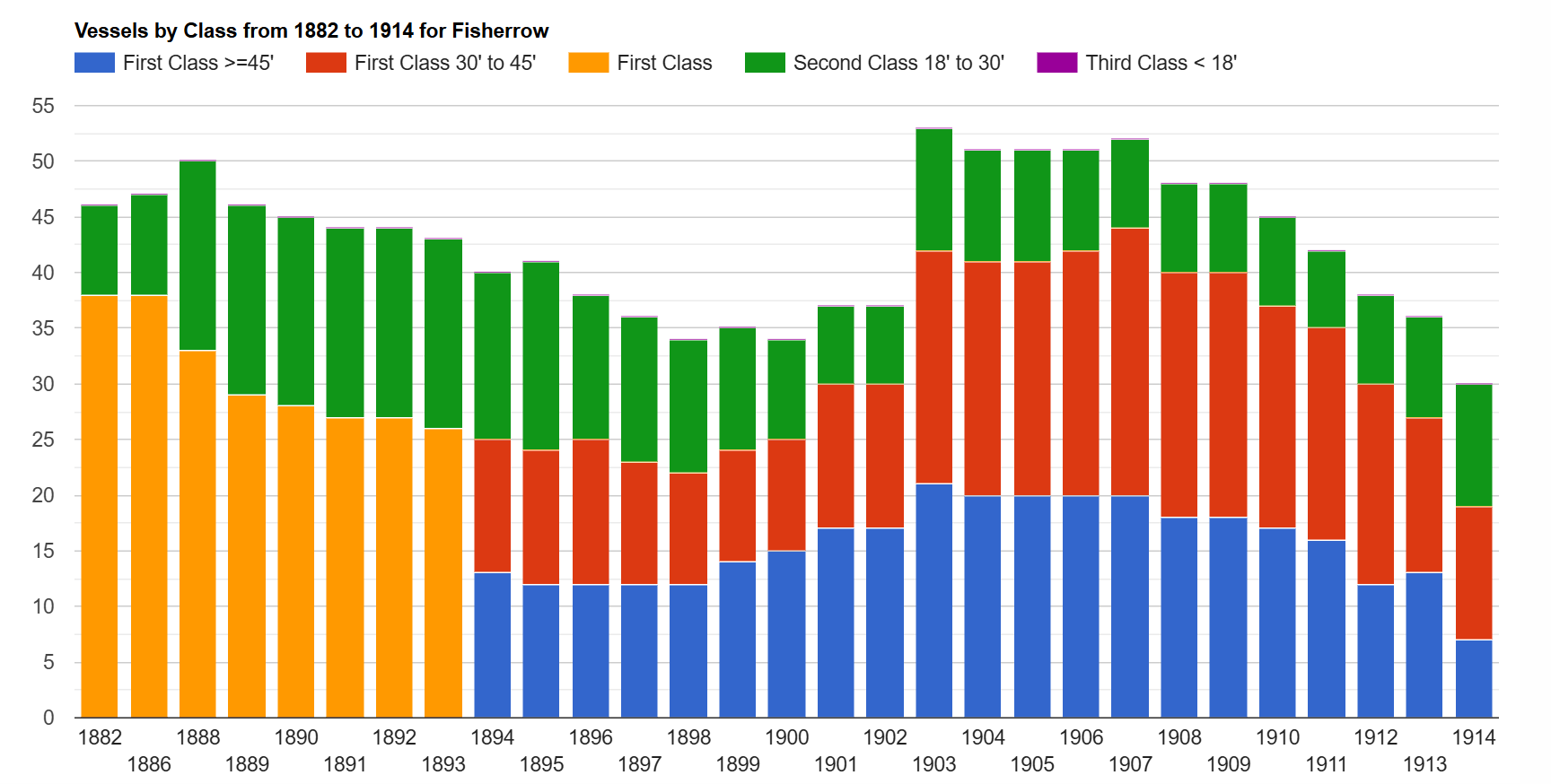
Vessels by class

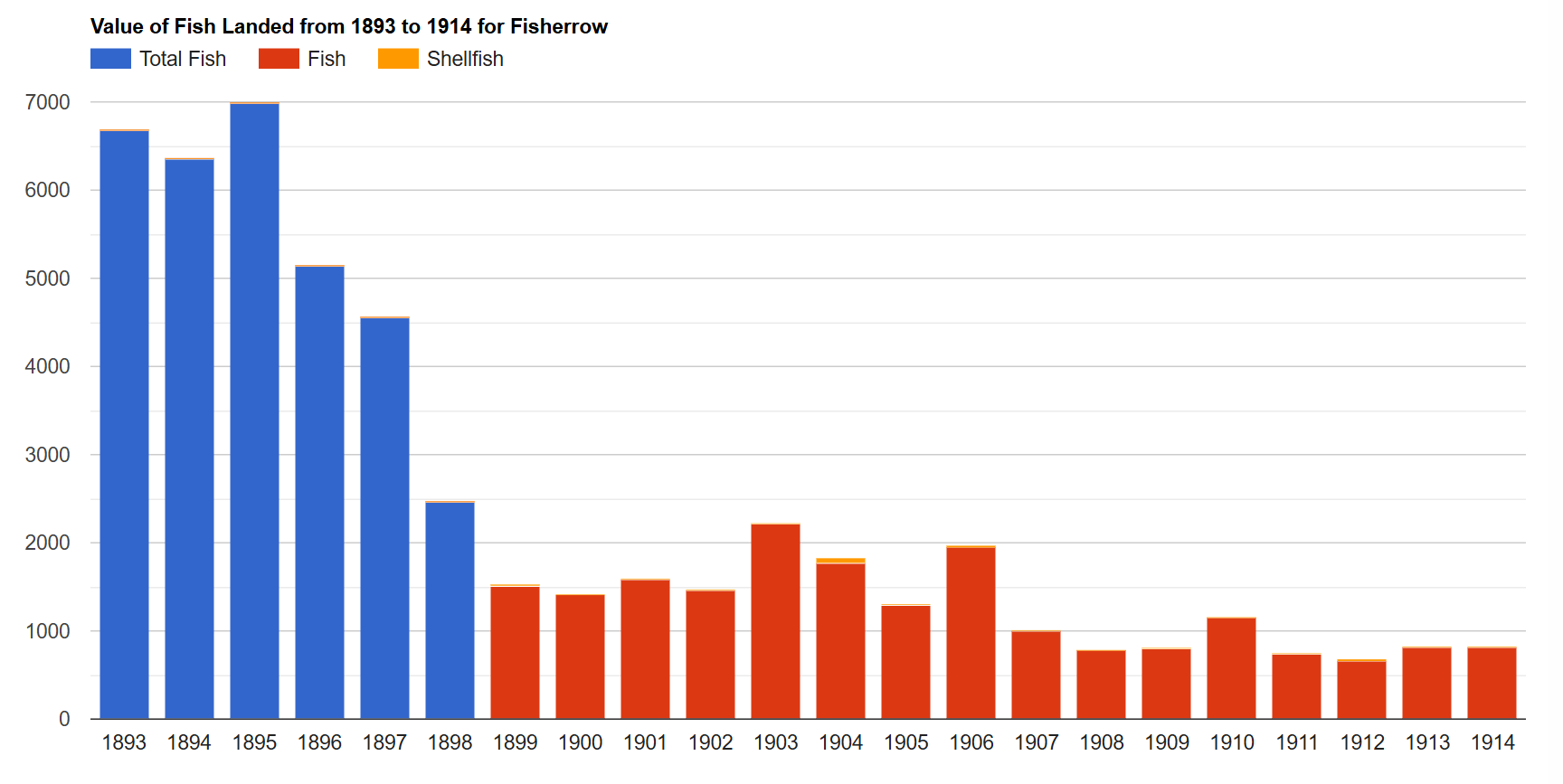
Value (£) of fish landed

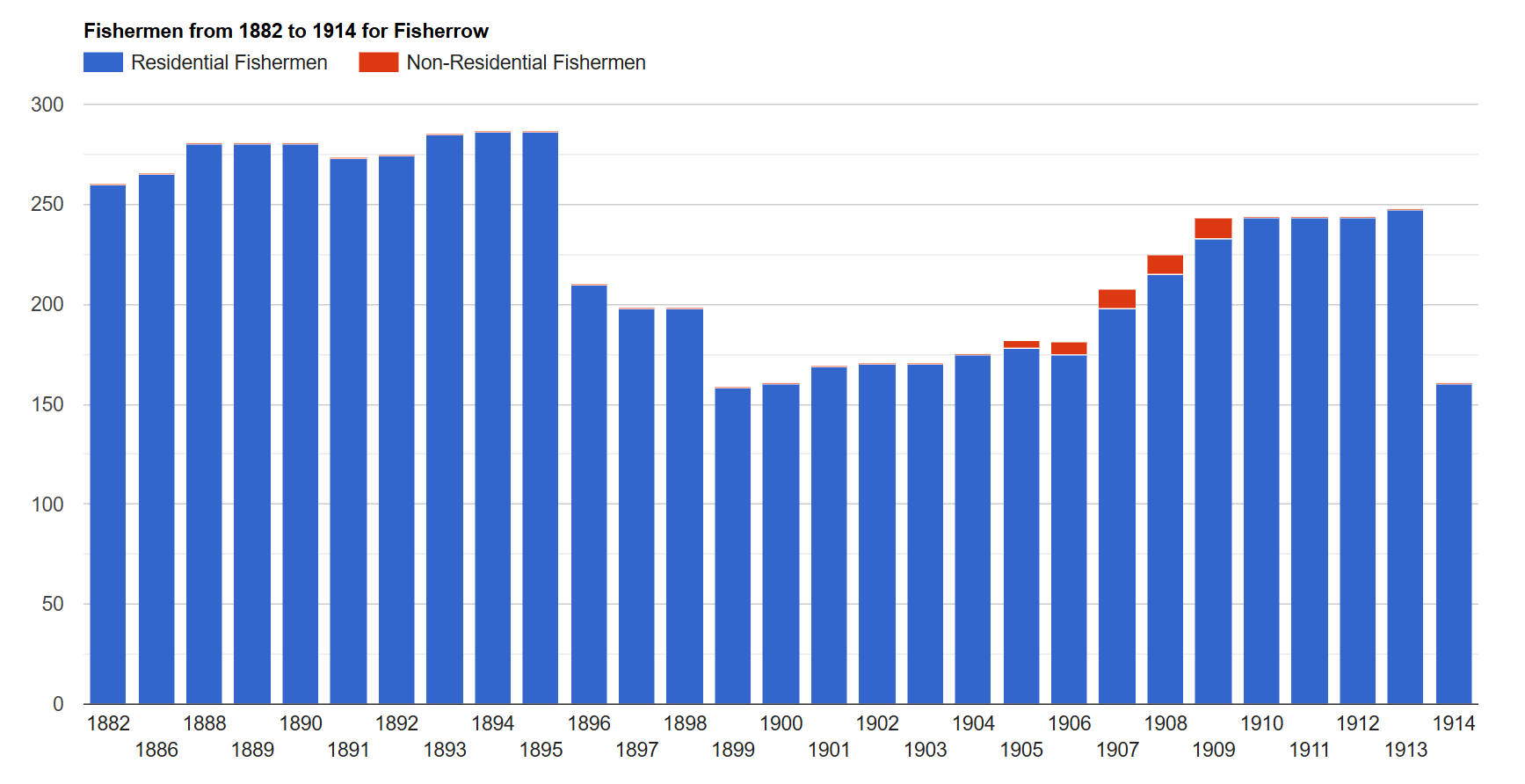
Fishermen

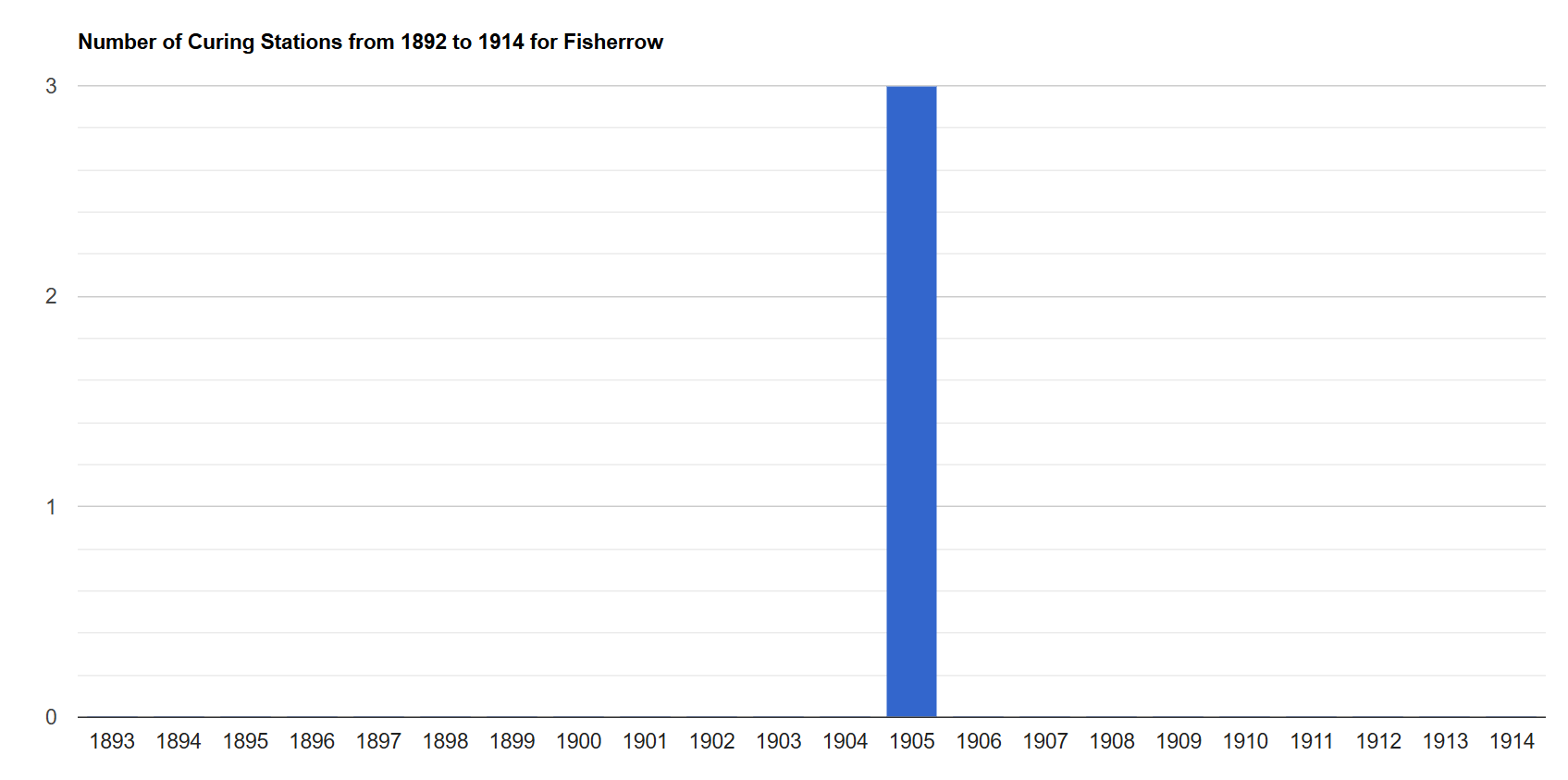
Number of curing stations

In 1939, the Firth of Forth became a strategic area for the Royal Navy and the Royal Air Force, and fishing activities were curtailed. Fishermen's Associations and politicians protested against this, and some of the restrictions were lifted. But despite this, many fishermen were called up, and the Navy commandeered some of the boats for war service.

== Present ==
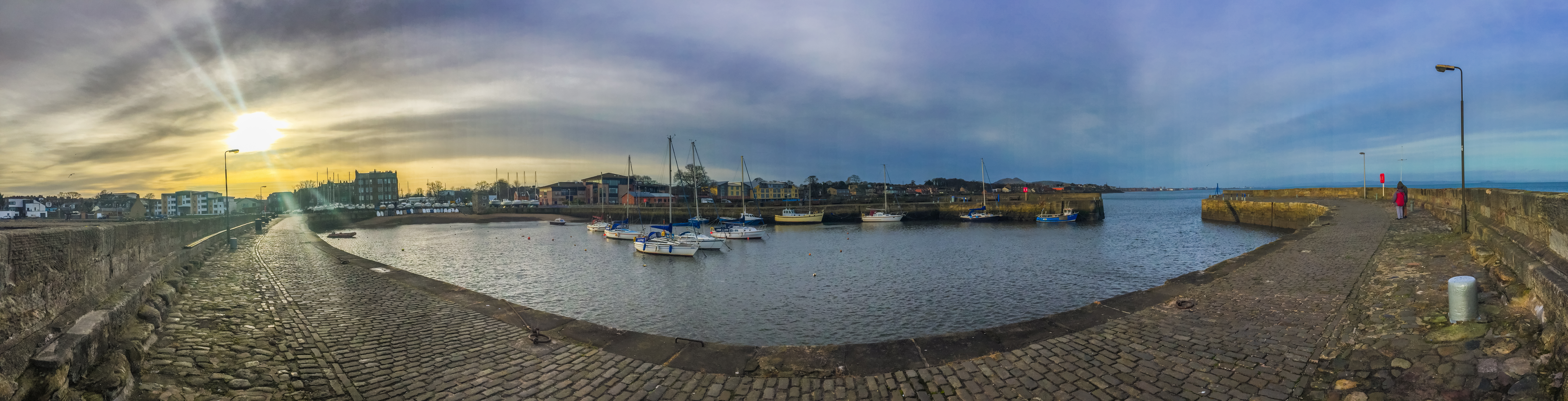
Panorama of Fisherrow Harbour

The harbour is now predominantly used by leisure craft. Fisherrow Yacht Club offers dinghy and yacht sailing.

The local Sea Cadets receive training at Fisherrow Harbour and at their Unit in South Street.

Fisherrow Harbour is home to Eskmuthe Rowing Club which rows skiffs as part of the Scottish Coastal Rowing Association.

Fisherrow is on the John Muir Way, a long-distance footpath along the East Lothian coast, terminating in Helensburgh.

Fisherrow Links offers nine-hole pitch and putt, as well as bowling greens.

Fisherrow Sands is sandy beach to the west of Fisherrow harbour.

Fisherrow Waterfront Group is a community group who are working to improve the appearance and amenity of the Fisherrow Waterfront and ensure the community can play a part in the area.

== In Literature ==
Part of Some Terrible Letters from Scotland, James Hogg's response to the cholera epidemic of 1831-32 first published in the Metropolitan magazine in April 1832, is set in Fisherrow. Musselburgh and Fisherrow were particularly severely affected by the epidemic.

== See also ==
- List of places in East Lothian

== Photo gallery ==
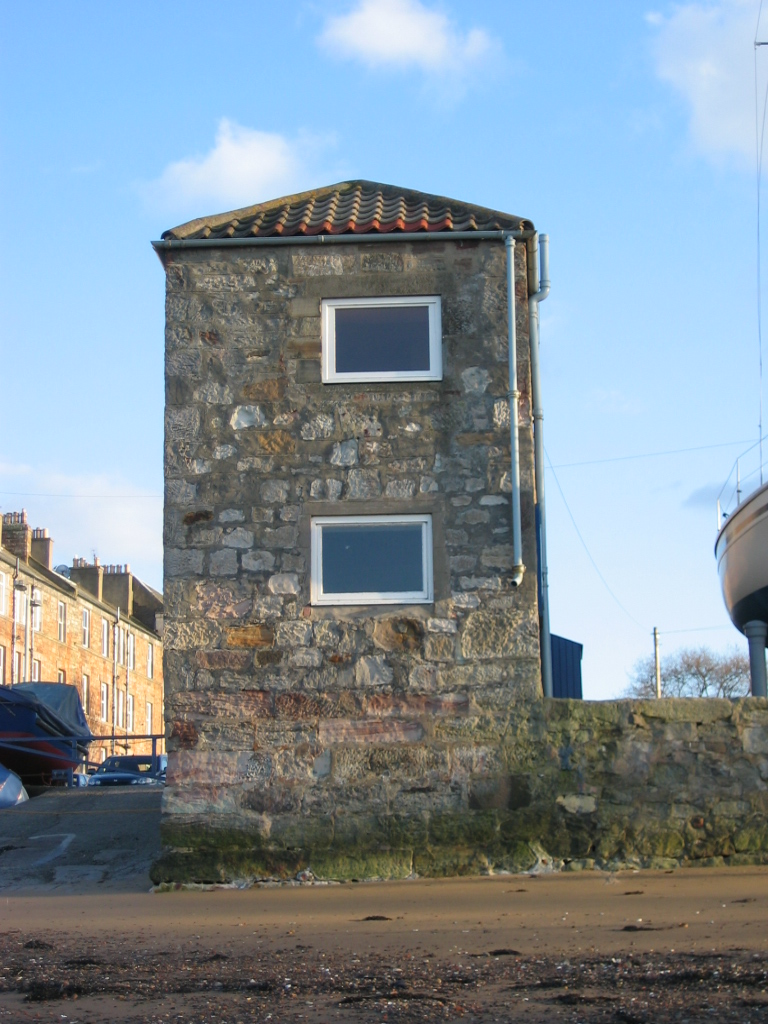
Harbour Master's Office

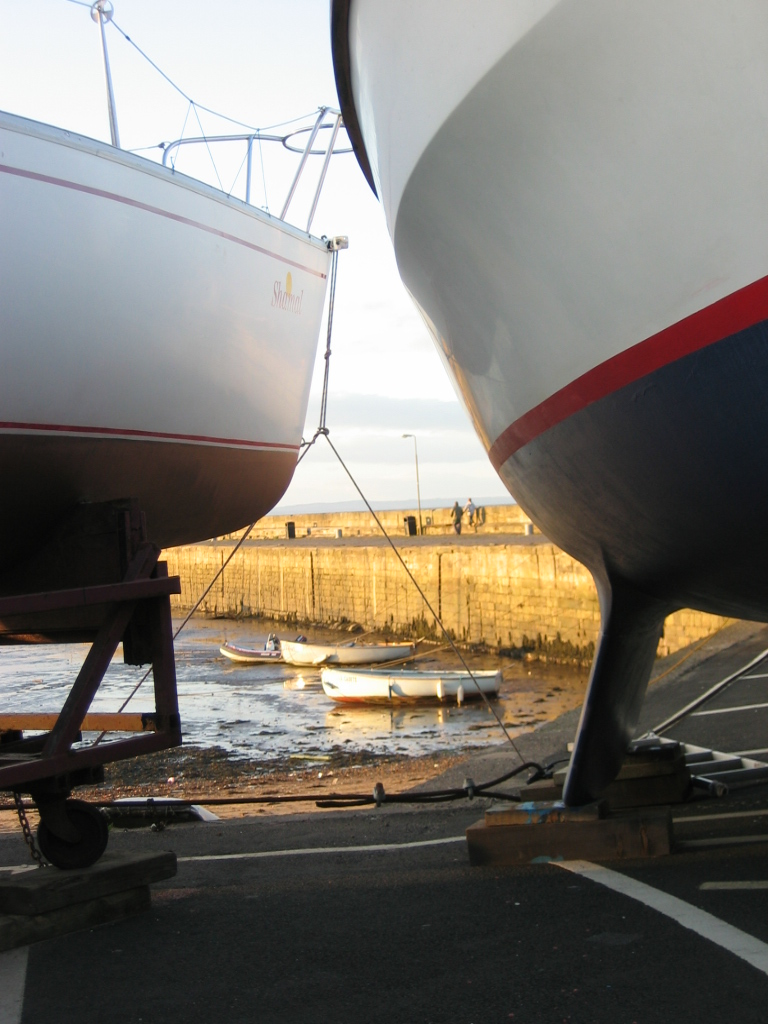
Sailing boats

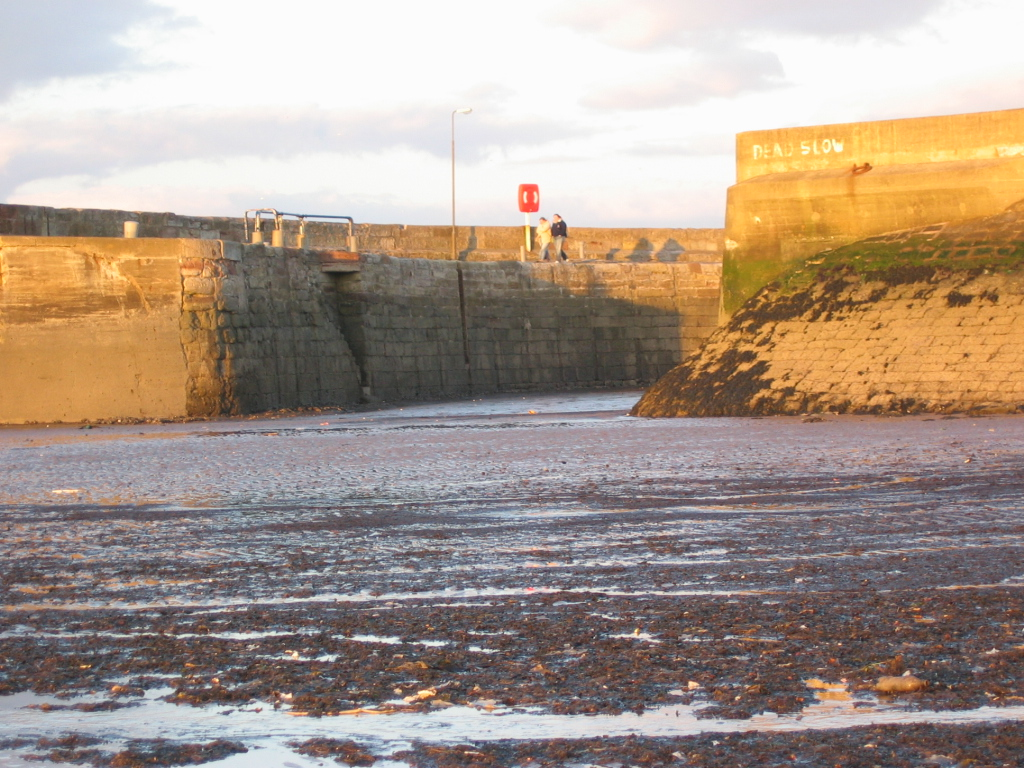
Harbour entrance

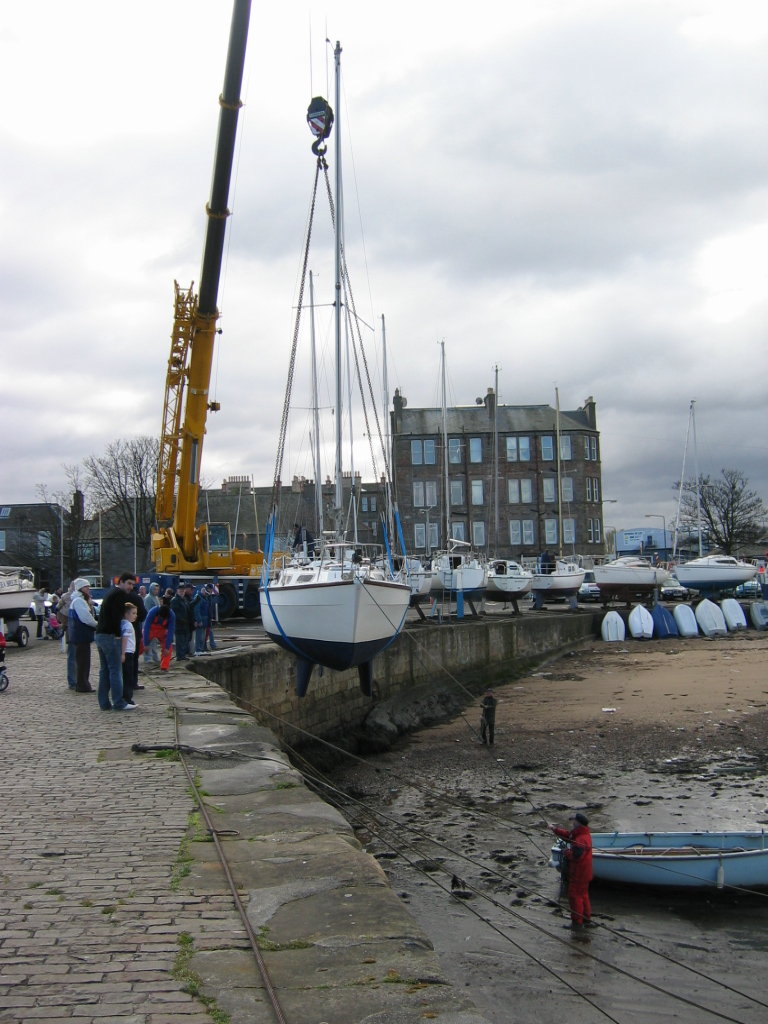
Crane-in 2008
