= William Norman Ramsay =

Scottish army officer (1782–1815)

- Born: 1782; Balmain, Kincardineshire
- Died: 18 June 1815 (aged 32–33); Waterloo, United Kingdom of the Netherlands
- Burial place: St Michael's Church, Inveresk
- Military career
- Allegiance: Great Britain; United Kingdom
- Branch: British Army
- Service years: 1798–1815
- Rank: Major
- Commands: I Troop (Bull's) RHA; H Troop (Ramsay's) RHA
- Conflicts: Napoleonic Wars; Egyptian campaign; Peninsular War; Battle of Bussaco; Battle of Casal Novo; Battle of Foz de Arouce; Battle of Sabugal; Battle of Fuentes d'Onoro; Battle of Salamanca; Siege of Burgos; Battle of Venta del Pozo; Battle of Vittoria; Waterloo campaign; Battle of Waterloo †
- Memorials: Church of Saint Joseph, Waterloo

Major William Norman Ramsay (1782–1815) was a Scottish officer in the British Royal Horse Artillery who fought in the Napoleonic Wars, and was noted for his valour. He was killed in action at Waterloo. He was sometimes called Norman Ramsay.

== Life ==
=== Origins ===
William Norman Ramsay, born in 1782, was the eldest son of Captain David Ramsay, of the Royal Navy (died 1818), and belonged to the family of the Ramsays of Balmain in Kincardineshire. (Note: see Sir John Ramsay) He entered the Royal Military Academy as a cadet on 17 January 1797, was commissioned as second lieutenant in the Royal Artillery on 27 October 1798, became first lieutenant on 1 August 1800, and second captain on 24 April 1806. He served in the Egyptian campaign, 1800–1.

=== Peninsular War ===
Ramsay (holding sword) leading I (Bull's) Troop through French lines at the Battle of Fuentes de Oñoro

In 1809 Ramsay was posted to I (Bull's) Troop of the Royal Horse Artillery, and went with it to Portugal. It was engaged at the Battle of Bussaco in 1810, and was specially thanked by Sir Stapleton Cotton, for its zeal and activity in covering the subsequent retreat to Torres Vedras.

When the British Army again advanced in 1811 the troop equally distinguished itself. It was mentioned by Wellington in his despatches of 14 and 16 March and 9 April for its conduct in the affairs of Cazal Nova, Foz d'Aronce, and Sabugal. At the Battle of Fuentes de Oñoro on 5 May the cavalry on the British right wing was driven back by the French, which was in much greater strength, and I Troop, or part of it, was cut off. It was supposed that the guns were lost, but soon a commotion was observed among the French cavalry:

an English shout pealed high and clear, the mass was rent asunder, and Norman Ramsay burst forth, sword in hand, at the head of his battery, his horses breathing fire, stretched like greyhounds along the plain, the guns bounded behind them like things of no weight, and the mounted gunners followed close, with heads bent low and pointed weapons in desperate career.

A drawing of this incident, by Richard Beavis, later entered the collection of the Royal United Service Institution.

In 1812 the troop took part in the Battle of Salamanca, and in the advance on Burgos and retreat from it, distinguishing itself in the action of Venta de Pozo on 23 October. Major Bull was wounded during the retreat, and had to leave the army. The command of the troop fell temporarily to Ramsay; and, though Major Frazer assumed it in the beginning of 1813, his appointment to command the whole of the Horse Artillery three months afterwards left I Troop in Ramsay's hands throughout the campaign of 1813.

At Vittoria (21 June 1813) the troop was attached to Graham's corps, and contributed largely to the capture of Abechuco, by which the French Army was cut off from the Bayonne road, its best line of retreat. Ramsay rode a couple of six-pounders over a hedge and ditch, to get them up in time to act against the retreating enemy. Frazer wrote that 'Bull's troop (which I have no hesitation in saying is much the best in this country) had, under Ramsay's command, been of unusual and unquestionable service.'

==== Insubordination ====
Two days after the battle (23 June) Ramsay was ordered forward in pursuit of the French. Wellington met him at a neighbouring village, and, as he had some thought of sending him with Graham's corps by another road, told him, according to his own account, to halt there

and not to move from it till he should receive further orders from myself, knowing that he would be sent to from the advanced posts. Notwithstanding these orders, Ramsay left the village in the morning before the orders reached him to join Graham; and he got forward into the defile, and it was not possible to bring him back till the whole column had passed.

For this alleged disobedience Wellington put Ramsay under arrest.

Ramsay's act was due to some misunderstanding. He supposed that he was to wait at the village for the night, and that if orders for the troop were issued in the course of the night, Wellington would forward them. None came; and next morning Ramsay, acting on the verbal directions of a staff-officer and a written order from the quartermaster-general, advanced to rejoin the Cavalry Brigade, to which he belonged. As his friend and chief, Frazer wrote: 'Admitting, contrary to all evidence, that he had mistaken the verbal orders he received, this, surely, is a venial offence, and one for which long-tried and faithful services should not be forgotten.' There was a strong feeling in the army that he was hardly used, but Sir Thomas Graham's intercession on his behalf only irritated Wellington. A distorted account of this affair is given in Lover's Handy Andy. Ramsay was soon released, but was not recommended for promotion.

In the middle of July Ramsay was allowed to resume command of his troop, and on 22 November he received a brevet majority. In the advance of the army over the Pyrenees his troop was attached to Sir John Hope's corps, and he was one of the officers specially mentioned by Hope in his report of the actions near Biarritz on 10–12 December. Ramsay was twice wounded slightly in these actions.

=== The Hundred Days ===
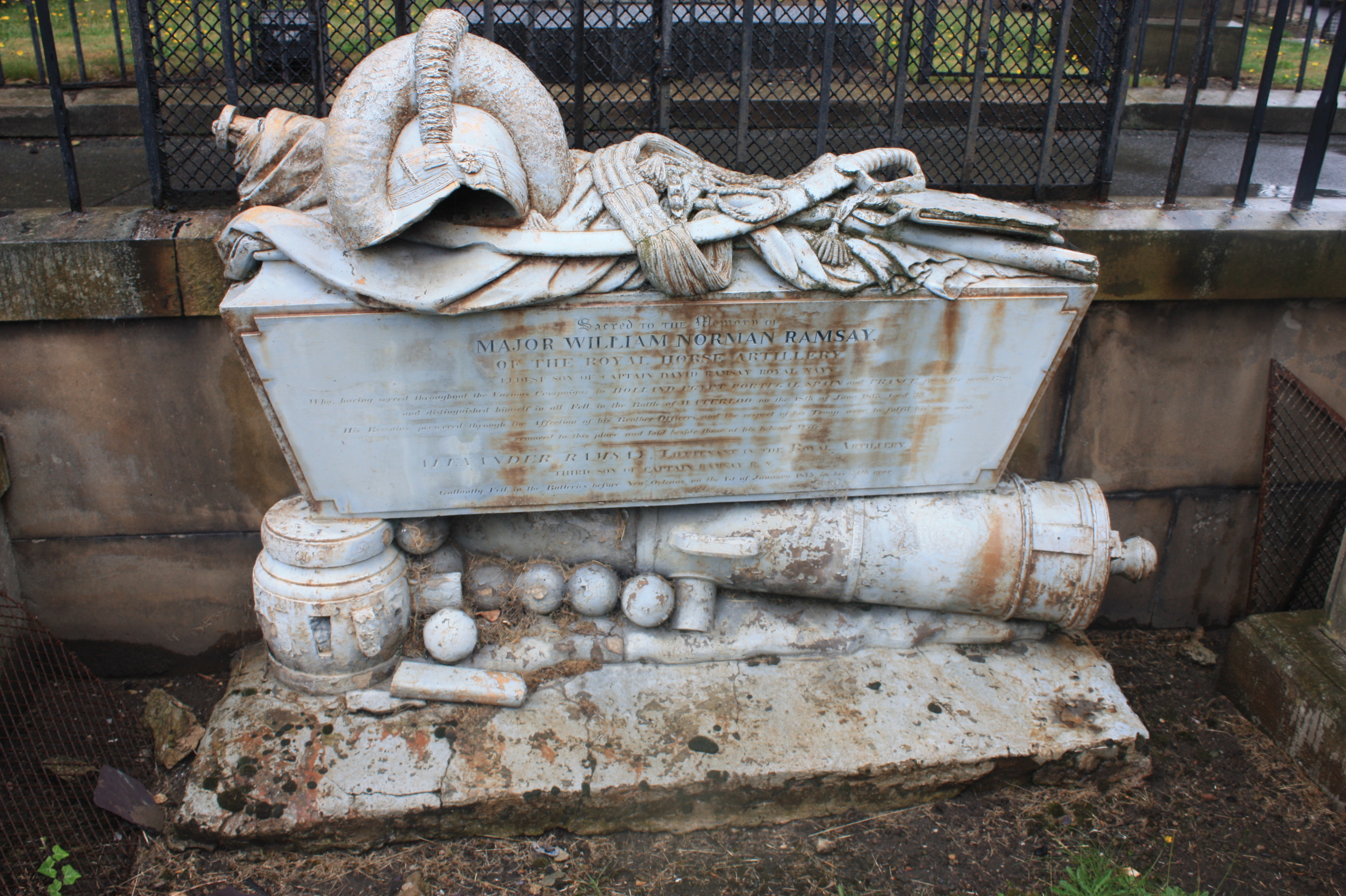
Ramsay's grave in the churchyard of St Michael's, Inveresk

On 17 December he became captain in the regiment, and had to return to England to take command of K Troop. In the spring of 1815 he was transferred to H Troop, which formed part of Wellington's army in the Netherlands. A week before Waterloo Frazer speaks of him as 'adored by his men; kind, generous, and manly, he is more than the friend of his soldiers.'

At Waterloo his troop was at first with the Cavalry Division, but, like the rest of the Horse Artillery, it was soon brought into action in the front line. It was placed a little to the left rear of Hougoumont, and there before the end of the day it had lost four officers out of five. Ramsay himself was killed about 4 pm, during the heavy fire of artillery and skirmishers which was the prelude of the French cavalry charges. A bullet, passing through a snuff-box which he carried, entered his heart.

His friend Frazer buried the body during a momentary lull of the battle in a hollow immediately behind, and afterwards erected a monument in the church at Waterloo, with an inscription to his memory. The body was, a few weeks afterwards, sent to Scotland, where on 8 August it was reinterred in the churchyard of Inveresk, near Edinburgh, the burial-place of his family, beneath a fine sarcophagus, supported by a cannon and some shot, and surmounted by a helmet, sword, and accoutrements.

=== Family ===
Ramsay married, on 14 June 1808, Mary Emilia, eldest daughter of Lieutenant-general Norman McLeod, twentieth chief of McLeod; she died on 10 August 1809. Of his two brothers, one (Lieutenant Alexander Ramsay, of the Royal Artillery) was killed in the attack on New Orleans on 1 January 1815; and the youngest (Lieutenant David Ramsay, of the Royal Navy) died at Jamaica on 31 July of the same year.

== See also ==
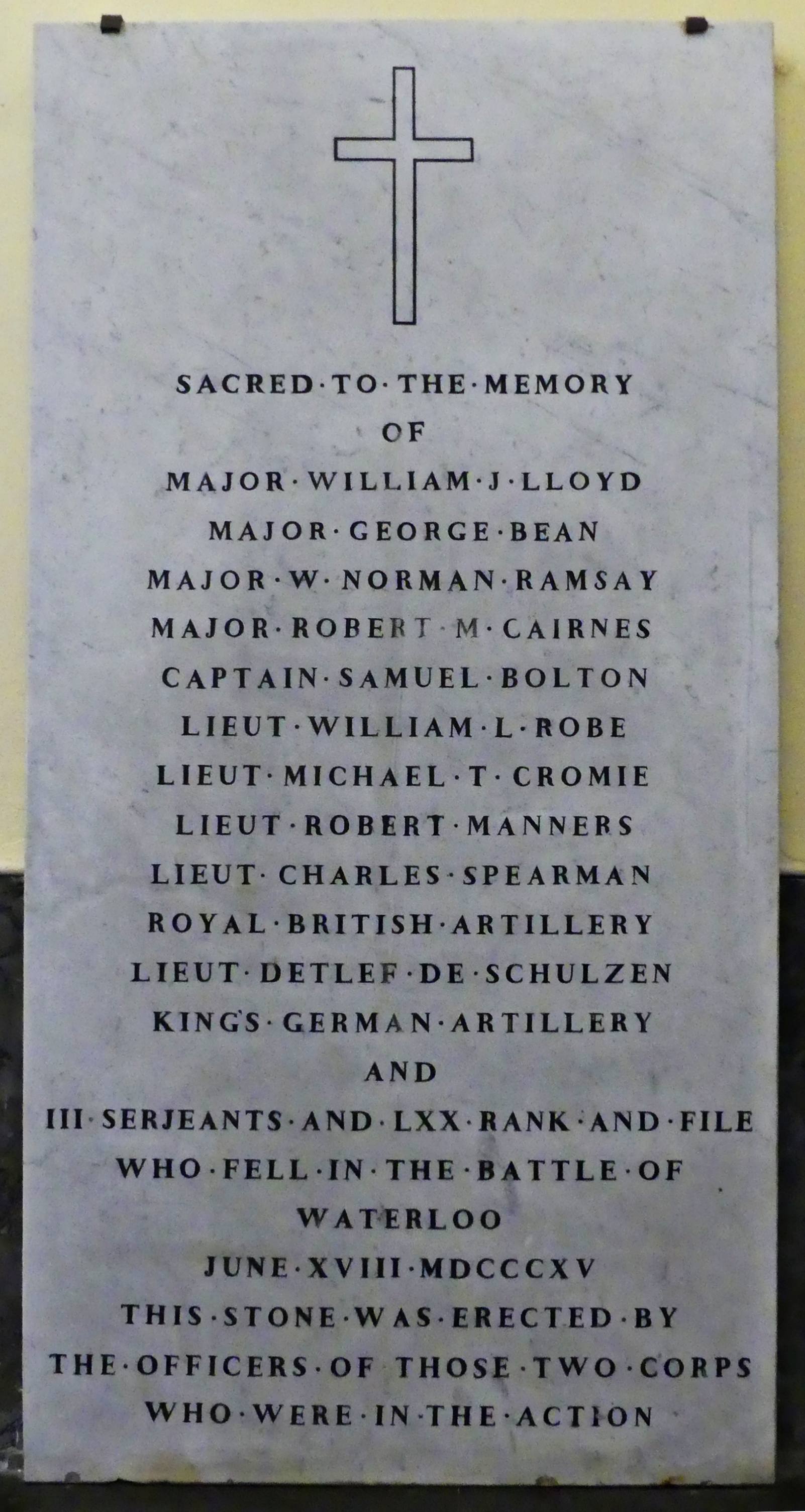
Commemorative tablet in the Church of Saint Joseph, Waterloo

- Clan Ramsay
- Ramsay baronets

== Bibliography ==
=== Primary sources ===
- Gurwood, John, ed. (1838). The Dispatches of Field Marshal the Duke of Wellington. Vol. 10. London: John Murray.
- Napier, William Francis Patrick (1836). History of the War in the Peninsula and in the South of France, from the Year 1807 to the Year 1814. Oxford: David Christy.
- Sabine, Edward, ed. (1859). Letters of Colonel Sir A. S. Frazer during the Peninsula and Waterloo Campaigns. London, Longman, Brown, Green, Longmans, & Roberts.

=== Secondary sources ===
- Dalton, Charles (1904). The Waterloo Roll Call. 2nd ed. London: Eyre and Spottiswoode. pp. 217–219, 276
- Lloyd, Ernest Marsh (1896). "Ramsay, William Norman" . In Lee, Sidney (ed.). Dictionary of National Biography. Vol. 47. London: Smith, Elder & Co. pp. 263–265.
- Lloyd, E. M. and Stearn, Roger T. (2004). "Ramsay, William Norman (1782–1815), army officer". In Oxford Dictionary of National Biography. Oxford University Press.
