= Inveresk Roman Fort =

Archaeological site in East Lothian, Scotland

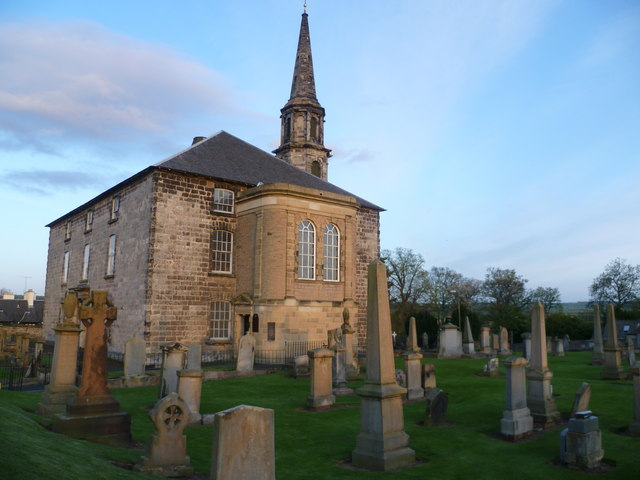
- Inveresk Parish Kirk, site of the Roman Fort

- Location within East Lothian
- 55.9365°N 3.0546°W
- Location: Inveresk, East Lothian, Scotland

Inveresk Roman Fort is an archaeological site within the grounds of St Michael's Church, Inveresk, a village in East Lothian, Scotland.

== Fort ==
The fort covered an area of 6.6 acres (2.7 ha), placing it at the larger end of the spectrum of fort sizes. For this reason, the original excavator, Ian Richmond, believed that a cavalry regiment had been stationed here. In 2007 a Roman tombstone was found at nearby Carberry depicting a Roman Governor's guard cavalry trooper named "Crescens" who was perhaps residing at the fort when he died.

In 2010, excavations to the east, in the civilian settlement portion of this fort, archeologists partially uncovered the remnants of a Mithraeum. This is the earliest dated mithraeum found so far in Scotland and the earliest dated one found in Britain. During these excavations, two large sandstone altars were found. And, they are now in the National Museum of Scotland. They date to around 140 AD when southern Scotland was reoccupied by Antoninus Pius. One altar was to the god Mithras and the other to the god Sol, both were dedicated by "G(aius) Cas(sius) Fla(...)," a Roman centurion.

== Occupation ==
All of the datable artefacts point to Antonine occupation. Consequently, the fort is thought to have been established in the immediate aftermath of the invasion of Scotland launched by the emperor Antoninus Pius in AD 139/140. Two clear phases of occupation were identified archaeologically, perhaps occasioned by a change of garrison during the Antonine period. The fort will have been abandoned, along with the other Scottish sites, around AD 160, when Hadrian's Wall was recommissioned.

A substantial civil settlement (vicus) lay outside the east rampart of the fort, and included a curving structure thought to be an amphitheatre.

== Archaeology ==
Several seasons of excavation since 1946, both major and minor, have established the outline of the fort and recovered some of the interior detail.

Excavations in 2004 by Headland Archaeology as part of work to renew the water mains in the village, found Roman artefacts and possible a boundary ditch and evidence of the vicus.

In 2010, CFA Archaeology undertook excavations, as part of a planning condition in advance of the construction of the Musselburgh Primary Health Care Centre, on an area 50m to the north and down slope of the fort. Those excavations reveled a Mesolithic stone tool scatter and Iron Age burials that pre-dated the fort. Those burials were date to 50 BC – AD 130, just before the fort was built. Isotope analysis showed that the individuals were all local to the Musselburgh area.

The archaeologists found Roman remains, including six Roman human burials (four of which had been decapitated) and one horse burial. They also found evidence that a Roman fortlet was constructed and that at some point a Roman field system was put in place to grow food, possibly for the fort. The area was also used as a midden for the fort and a significant number discarded personal belongings of the fort occupants were recovered. This included samian bowls with personal names scratched on the bases. These names plus the isotope analysis of the human skeletons, shows those living in the fort came from multiple ethnic origins. The names indicates there may have been a group of soldiers from Thrace at the fort. The high number of horse equipment recovered led the archaeologists to believe that the theory that a cavalry unit was stationed there at some point is likely true.

== Name ==
The fort's Roman name remains unknown, although it has been suggested that Ptolemy's Κούρια (Curia or Coria), located in the lands of the Votadini, should be identified with Inveresk, "the name being transferred from a native meeting-place which it controlled (in this case perhaps Arthur's Seat, 4 miles to the west)". It may also have been called "Evidensca" according to the Ravenna Cosmography.

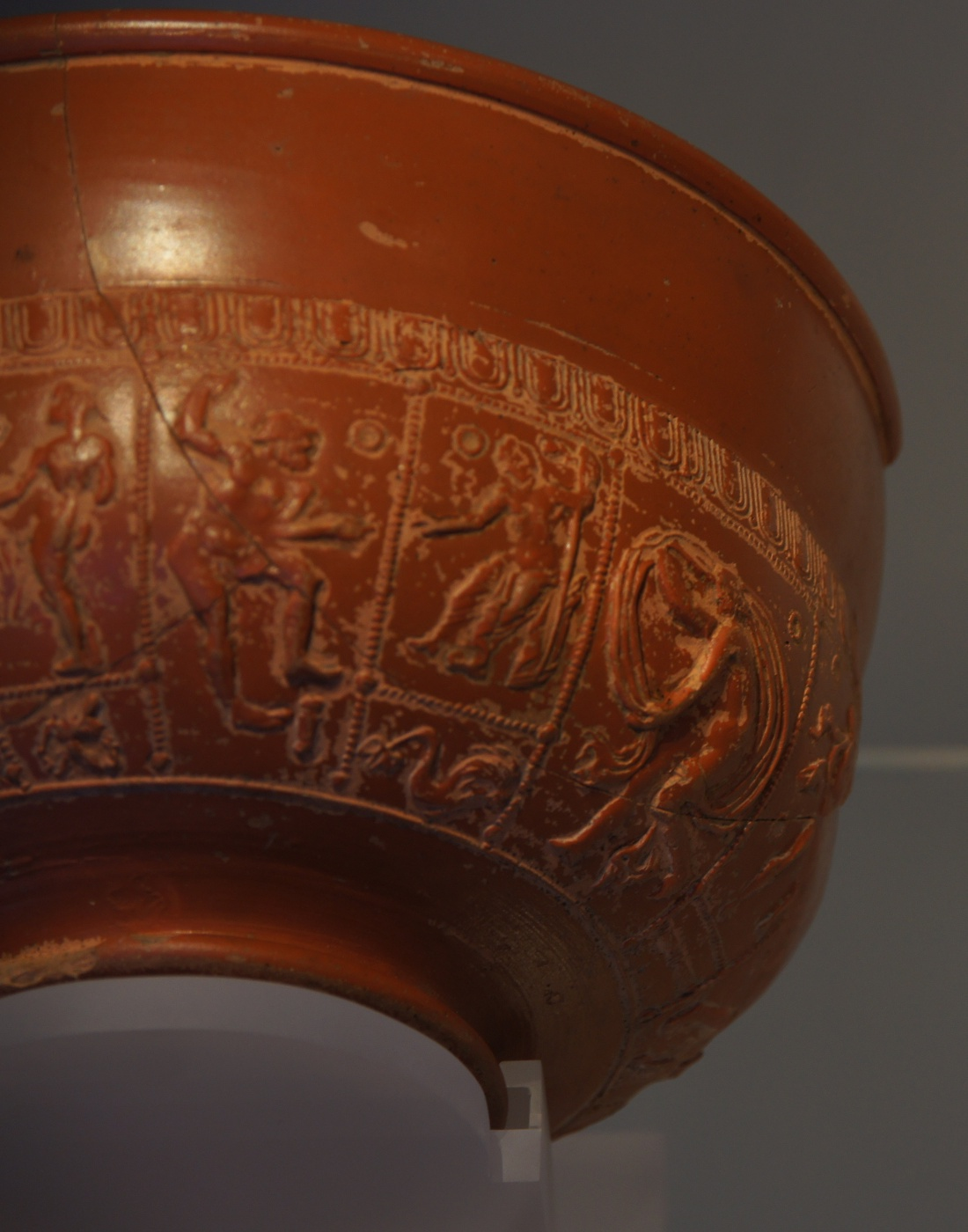
Samian bowl from Inveresk

== Sources ==
- M.C. Bishop (ed.), Roman Inveresk: Past, Present and Future (Duns: The Armatura Press, 2002)
