= Proposed Aberdeen stadium =

Football stadium in Aberdeen, Scotland

Aberdeen F.C. Beachfront Stadium
- The fencing around the construction site of the new stadium at Kingsford

- Location in Aberdeen
- Location: Aberdeen Beachfront, Aberdeen
- Coordinates: 57°9′11″N 2°4′38″W
- Owner: Aberdeen Football Club
- Capacity: 20,000
- Surface: Grass

Construction
- Cost: £50m (estimated)
- Architect: The Miller Partnership

Tenant
- Aberdeen F.C.

Website
- https://www.kingsfordstadium.co.uk/

The new Aberdeen stadium is a football stadium under early stages of construction in Kingswells, Aberdeen, Scotland. The new stadium, called Kingsford Stadium, would be the home of Scottish Premiership club Aberdeen FC to replace the existing Pittodrie Stadium. The development, 10.4 kilometres (6.5 mi) to the west of Aberdeen city centre, received planning approval from Aberdeen City Council in January 2018. Construction began in July 2018, with the first phase, a training facility named Cormack Park, opened in October 2019. The stadium had been scheduled for completion by 2023, but in the midst of disruption caused by the COVID-19 pandemic in Scotland, the club confirmed that the project had been put on hiatus, and in 2021 alternative designs at the city's beachfront close to Pittodrie were released. In December 2025, Aberdeen FC and the Aberdeen City council met to discuss options for a community stadium on the beach.

== Background ==
Plans for a new stadium began when the club indicated that further development of Pittodrie Stadium, sited to the north of Aberdeen city centre, was not possible due to the age of the ground (originally laid out in the 1890s before the existing version of the club was formed, three of the stands are adaptations of structures dating back to the 1920s) and the restrictions from surrounding land. The severe disruption to the club's activities, and the potential to wipe out some of the debt by selling the club-owned land for redevelopment, moreover, made a new stadium the only viable option. In July 2008, the club reiterated their desire to move forwards with a new 21,000-seat stadium, despite a financial crisis that had hit Aberdeen City Council. The plan is unrelated to that of nearby Balmoral Stadium, completed in 2015 for use by semi-professional Cove Rangers.

In December 2025, Aberdeen Football Club made a 'Full and Final offer' to the Aberdeen City Council which would see a community stadium being built on the beach. It was said it could contribute up to £3.2 Billion to the Aberdeen economy.

== History ==
In April 2009, the Arena Project Board recommended a site in Nigg for the new stadium. The majority of fans responding to a questionnaire on the proposal from Aberdeen Supporters Trust opposed the building of the new stadium on that site. Amongst the 10% of Aberdeen fans who replied, 81.2% were against the location of the new stadium and indicated that the second site of Kings Links adjacent to the existing Pittodrie would be their first choice. 62.8% said they would attend fewer matches if the move was to go ahead. The Board considered that a site adjacent to Aberdeen's present home of Pittodrie Stadium was too small and too expensive.

The proposed site at Loirston was within a Green Belt area, which the local council may donate to the project. Concerns were raised over the new site as it would develop over Aberdeen's only fresh-water loch, and the need for large car parking facilities. Approval for the project could have triggered consent for other property developers who had outline plans for this particular area for a number of years, but until then had been refused due to the green belt status.

Aberdeen City Council deferred a decision until the next full meeting of the local authority. The full council approved the project in May 2009, subject to planning permission. In August 2010, a planning application for the new stadium was submitted to the Council, which was approved in February 2011.

It was announced in August 2011 that Barr Construction Ltd would be the contractor for the construction of the stadium, which was scheduled to begin in 2012. In May 2012, construction of the new stadium was delayed for a year, until 2013, due to delays over land ownership. The project suffered a serious setback in August 2012, when Aberdeen City Council rejected a joint application by Aberdeen FC and Cove Rangers to build a community sports centre at the nearby Calder Park. Aberdeen FC's then-chairman Stewart Milne said in November 2013 that further negotiations had taken place between the club and the City Council.

In August 2014, Stewart Milne announced that because of the plans being rejected by the current Aberdeen City Council administration, the training facilities and new stadium would be built on two separate sites. Milne confirmed that the training facilities would be announced in the coming weeks and that negotiations were ongoing with the local authorities over the stadium. In November 2014 it was announced that Aberdeen would build its long-awaited training facilities at Balgownie, on land owned by the University of Aberdeen. The proposals for Balgownie and Loirston were dropped in May 2016, as Aberdeen instead announced their intention to develop a site at Kingsford, to the west of the city.

== Kingsford proposal ==
The Kingsford site, located on farmland between the commuter towns of Westhill, Aberdeenshire (population 11,600) to the west and Kingswells (population around 5,000) to the east, is on the A944 road, and also served by the Aberdeen Western Peripheral Route, which was completed in early 2019. The club had proposed moving to the nearby site of Bellfield (immediately south of Kingswells) in 2003, but this was dropped due to local opposition and the withdrawal of possible government funding. A planning application for the Kingsford site was submitted in January 2017. As the proposed site is on the boundary between the Aberdeen city and Aberdeenshire council areas, different parts of the development will require approval from each authority.

A community action group of local residents, "No Kingsford Stadium", was established in May 2016 to campaign against the proposed development. A poll of approximately 500 local residents showed nearly 60% were opposed to the Kingsford proposal.

The project was placed on hold in October 2017, and a further public consultation was scheduled for January 2018. Shortly after the hold announcement, American businessman Tom Crotty invested £775,000 into the project after discussions with former player Bobby Clark (a long time resident of the United States). Revised plans for the Kingsford project were approved by Aberdeen City Council on 29 January 2018, and the Scottish Government decided that the application did not require scrutiny at a national level. The proposal has been opposed by Aberdeenshire Council. The No Kingsford Stadium (NKS) group applied for a judicial review, but this was rejected by the Court of Session in March 2019.

Aberdeen FC intends to sell its current home, Pittodrie Stadium, for housing development. This project received outline planning approval in April 2011.

== Construction ==
=== Cormack Park ===
Construction work at Kingsford was commenced on 3 July 2018, with ceremonial digging duties performed by club chairman Stewart Milne and manager Derek McInnes. The initial phase, costing £10 million, was to include the club's training facilities with access for use by the local community and would be completed after a year.

In August 2019, the club confirmed that the training facility would be named Cormack Park due to the contribution made to the project by then-vice chairman Dave Cormack; supporters were invited to vote for their favourite past players whose names would be used for each of the six pitches at the complex – those chosen were Neale Cooper, Joe Harper, Eoin Jess, Jim Leighton, Willie Miller and Teddy Scott.

An opening date was set for 31 October, with Alex Ferguson to perform ceremonial duties. At the opening ceremony, where Ferguson described Cormack Park as "up there with the best" he had seen, Stewart Milne commented that the stadium opening would now likely be in 2023 due to delays in securing funding and permissions, with the hope that property prices in central Aberdeen would rise in the intervening period to maximise sale value of the Pittodrie site for development. Four weeks later, Milne announced he would step aside as chairman, with media speculating that the change in leadership could lead to the club remaining at Pittodrie.

== Beachfront proposal ==
In January 2021, discussions began between the club and the city council over a possible development at the city's beachfront, close to Pittodrie. The talks were welcomed by local politicians. Initially proposed for a site currently occupied by a hotel and the Transition Extreme sports venue south of the Beach Ballroom, seven months later more detailed design information was released, with the stadium now on a site further north on a grass pitch used for cricket and baseball and immediately adjacent to the existing Linx Ice Arena and leisure centre, all of which would be replaced nearby as part of a wider regeneration plan for the area. In October 2022, it was reported that the development could bring economic benefit to the area.
