= Wedderburn =

Wedderburn may refer to:

== People ==
- Alexander Wedderburn (disambiguation)
- Bill Wedderburn, Baron Wedderburn of Charlton (1927–2012), British politician and legal scholar
- Charles F. Wedderburn (1892–1917), United States Navy officer
- David Wedderburn (disambiguation)
- Dorothy Wedderburn (1925–2012), British academic
- Ernest Wedderburn (1884–1958), Scottish lawyer
- James Wedderburn (disambiguation)
- Joseph Wedderburn (1882–1948), Scottish mathematician
- John Wedderburn of Ballindean (1729–1803), Scottish landowner
- Nat Wedderburn (born 1991), English footballer
- Richard Wedderburn (d. 1601), Scottish merchant based in Denmark
- Robert Wedderburn (poet) (died 1553), Scottish poet
- Robert Wedderburn (radical) (1762–1835/36), British radical
- Robert Wedderburn (statistician) (1947–1975), Scottish statistician
- Tim Wedderburn, Canadian hockey player
- William Wedderburn (1838–1918), Scottish civil servant and politician
- Zander Wedderburn (1935–2017), British psychologist

== Places ==
- Wedderburn, Victoria, Australia
- Wedderburn, New South Wales, Australia
- Wedderburn, New Zealand
- Wedderburn, Oregon, United States
- Wedderburn Castle, in Scotland

== Other uses ==
- USS Wedderburn

== See also ==
- Clan Wedderburn
- "Captain Wedderburn's Courtship", a Scottish ballad
- Wedderburn baronets
