= Burn of Tullochbeg =

River in Aberdeenshire, Scotland

Location
- Country: Scotland

Physical characteristics
- Mouth
  - location: Aberdeenshire, Scotland
  - coordinates: 57.432905°N 2.805738°W

Burn of Tullochbeg is a burn which marks the boundary of the parish of Huntly, Aberdeenshire, Scotland.
