= Pittodrie Stadium =

Football stadium in Aberdeen, Scotland

- Pittodrie
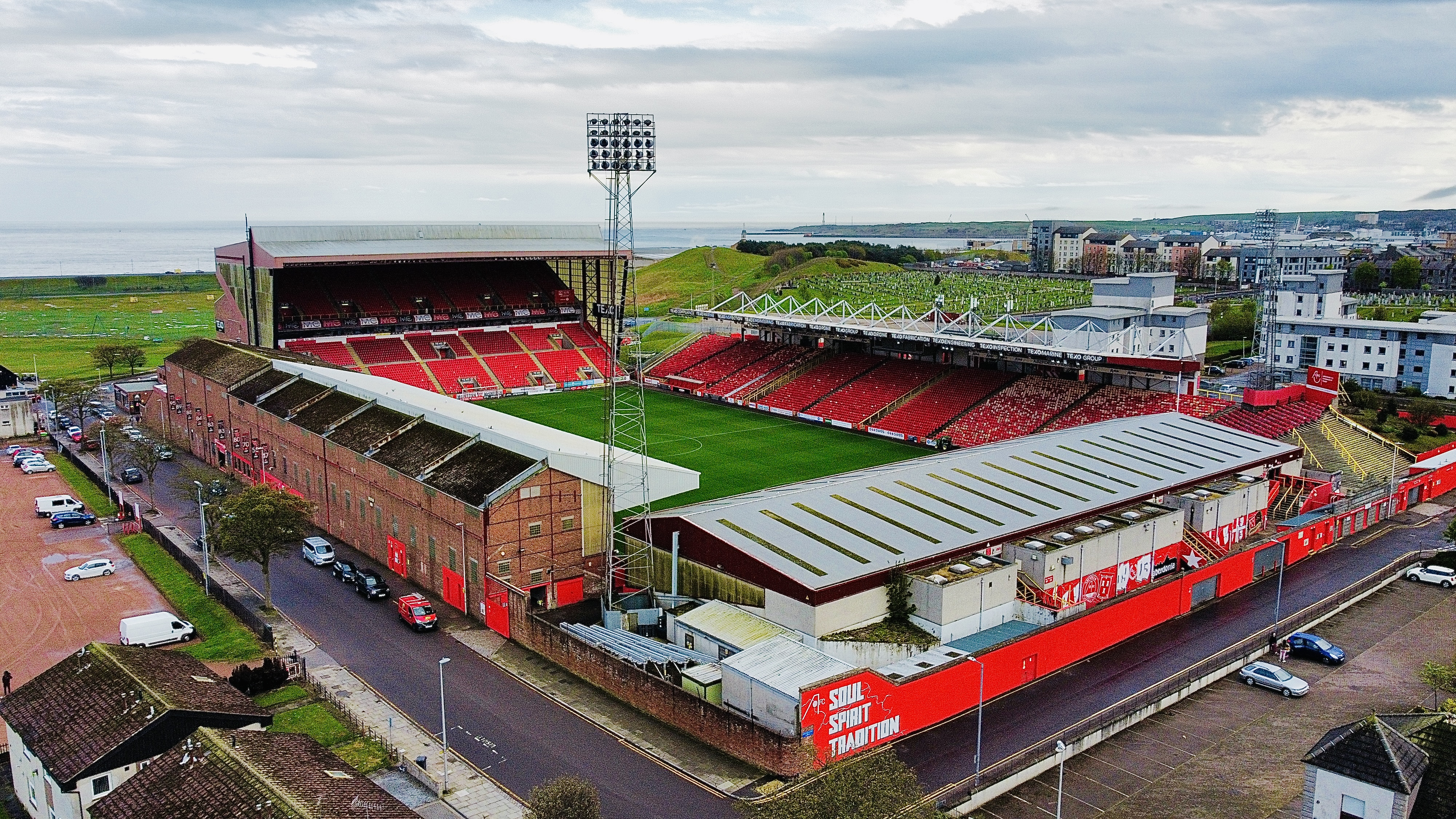
- Pittodrie, with North Sea in background. UEFA

- Location in Aberdeen
- Location: Pittodrie Street, Aberdeen, Scotland
- Coordinates: 57°09′33″N 2°05′20″W
- Owner: Aberdeen F.C.
- Capacity: 20,866
- Surface: Grass
- Field size: 109 yd × 72 yd (100 m × 66 m)

Construction
- Groundbreaking: 1899
- Opened: 2 September 1899
- Renovated: 1993 (Richard Donald Stand opened)
- Cost: £4.5 million (Richard Donald stand)

Tenants
- Aberdeen F.C. (1899–1903); Aberdeen F.C. (1903–present); Inverness Caledonian Thistle F.C. (2004–2005)

Pittodrie Stadium, commonly referred to as Pittodrie, from which the surrounding residential area has taken its name, is an all-seater stadium in Aberdeen, Scotland. Used primarily for football, it has been the home ground of the Scottish Professional Football League (SPFL) club Aberdeen F.C. since they were formed in 1903. Prior to then, the ground hosted the original Aberdeen F.C. from 1899 until the merger that created the present club.

With a seating capacity of 20,866 Pittodrie is the third largest stadium in the SPFL and the largest stadium in Scotland outside the Central Belt. Pittodrie has been the location of a number of firsts in the field of stadium design, including the invention of the dugout, and in 1978 became one of the first all-seater stadium in the United Kingdom.

As of November 2017, Pittodrie has hosted fifteen matches involving the Scotland national team. The ground has also staged rugby union, with four Scotland international fixtures being held there including a match against the Barbarians. In club football, Inverness Caledonian Thistle temporarily shared Pittodrie during part of the 2004–05 season.

== History ==
The original Aberdeen football club was formed in 1881. They played at various venues within the city, until a former dung hill for police horses was cleared and readied for football in 1899. The land was leased from Mr Knight Erskine of Pittodrie, with an agreement to construct a terrace on what is now the site of the Richard Donald Stand. The first game, a 7–1 win over Dumbarton, was played on 2 September 1899. The club was merged on 18 April 1903 with two other local clubs, Victoria United and Orion, to form Aberdeen FC. 8000 spectators turned up to watch the new Aberdeen FC play its first game at Pittodrie, a 1–1 draw in the Northern League against Stenhousemuir on 15 August 1903. The club joined the Scottish Football League in 1904.

Increasing popularity of the team and rising attendances led to major developments at Pittodrie in the 1920s. The club purchased the ground, which they had been leasing, with the final payment made on 1 December 1920. The Main Stand, where the club offices, dressing rooms and trophy room are located, was constructed in 1925. This was partly funded by the sale of Alex Jackson to Huddersfield Town. Also in the 1920s, the dugout was introduced to football by Aberdeen coach Donald Colman, who was interested in sitting lower to the pitch in order to inspect the players' footwork.

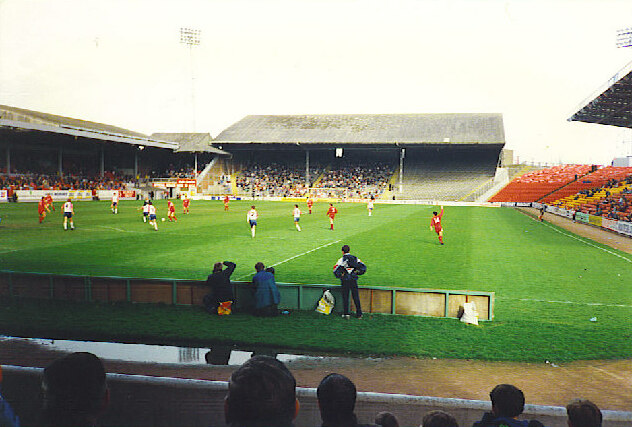
Old Beach End stand, which was replaced by the Richard Donald Stand in 1993.

The club won its first major trophy in 1947, when it won the Scottish Cup. With increased success came more additions to Pittodrie. The record attendance occurred on 13 March 1954, when 45,061 spectators turned up for a Scottish Cup match against Hearts. Floodlights were introduced at Pittodrie on 21 October 1959, when English league side Luton Town were beaten 3–2 in a friendly. By 1 August 1968, the Main Stand had become all-seated as part of a £100,000 improvement of the ground. This coincided with a change of name from Pittodrie Park to Pittodrie Stadium. On 6 February 1971, a fire destroyed part of the Main Stand, and gutted the dressing rooms and club offices. The Scottish Cup trophy, which was held by Aberdeen at the time, had to be rescued by firemen.

In 1978, Pittodrie became the first all-seater stadium in Great Britain, after the south terracing was fitted with bench style seating. This improvement pre-dated the Taylor Report on British football grounds by a decade and coincided with a distinct upturn in the fortunes of the home team, now managed by Alex Ferguson. The south side became the South Stand in 1980, following the installation of a cantilever roof which covered most of the seats. A year later, the benches were replaced by individual seats.

Both during the subsequent run in the 1980s and at numerous other times over the century the stadium has been in operation, there have been many memorable nights for the local fans. However, Pittodrie's greatest night is generally regarded as 16 March 1983. Aberdeen fought back from 2–1 down in a European Cup Winners' Cup quarter-final second leg tie against Bayern Munich to win 3–2. A full house witnessed this victory, which took the Dons through to the semi-finals, and they went on to win the trophy by defeating Real Madrid in the final. The club installed 24 executive boxes in the Main Stand, and built a new roof over the Merkland Road End in 1985. Undersoil heating was installed in 1987.

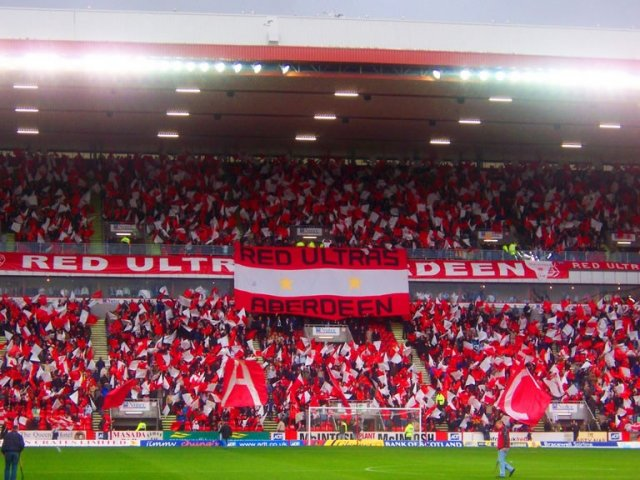
Richard Donald Stand on a match day

The most recent development of the stadium came in the 1992–93 season when the Beach End stand on the east side of the ground was demolished, with the new Richard Donald stand - named after the club's long serving chairman - constructed in its place. On 1 August 1993, the new stand was opened with a League Cup tie against Clydebank. The official opening was carried out later in 1993 by Princess Anne. It is currently the only two tier stand in the stadium. The stadium has remained relatively unchanged since then, although some minor improvements, such as the introduction of an electronic stadium entry system for the 2006–07 season, have been carried out.

The site of the stadium is only 550 yards away from the North Sea, and with only the King's Links golf course between the stadium and the beach, the ground is one of the coldest football grounds in Britain.

As a result of a ground sharing agreement, Pittodrie was used by Inverness Caledonian Thistle for their home matches during the early part of the 2004–05 season. This was required because Inverness CT's own Caledonian Stadium did not meet the requirements for entry into the Scottish Premier League until improvements were carried out and the seating capacity increased. In 2005 the stadium size criterion for entry to the SPL was reduced to 6,000, thereby allowing Inverness Caledonian Thistle to return to their home stadium partway during the season.

In March 2020 the club announced plans to reduce the operational capacity of Pittodrie to 15,500. Despite this, attendances in the 2023-24 season have been reported from 15,000 to 18,652.

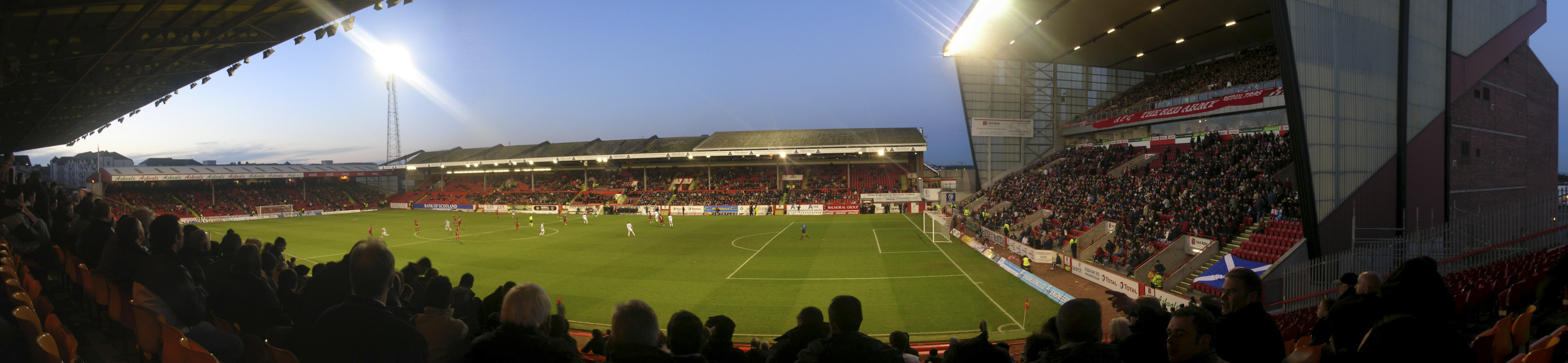
Pittodrie Stadium from the away section of the South Stand.

== Structure and facilities ==
Map of the four stands

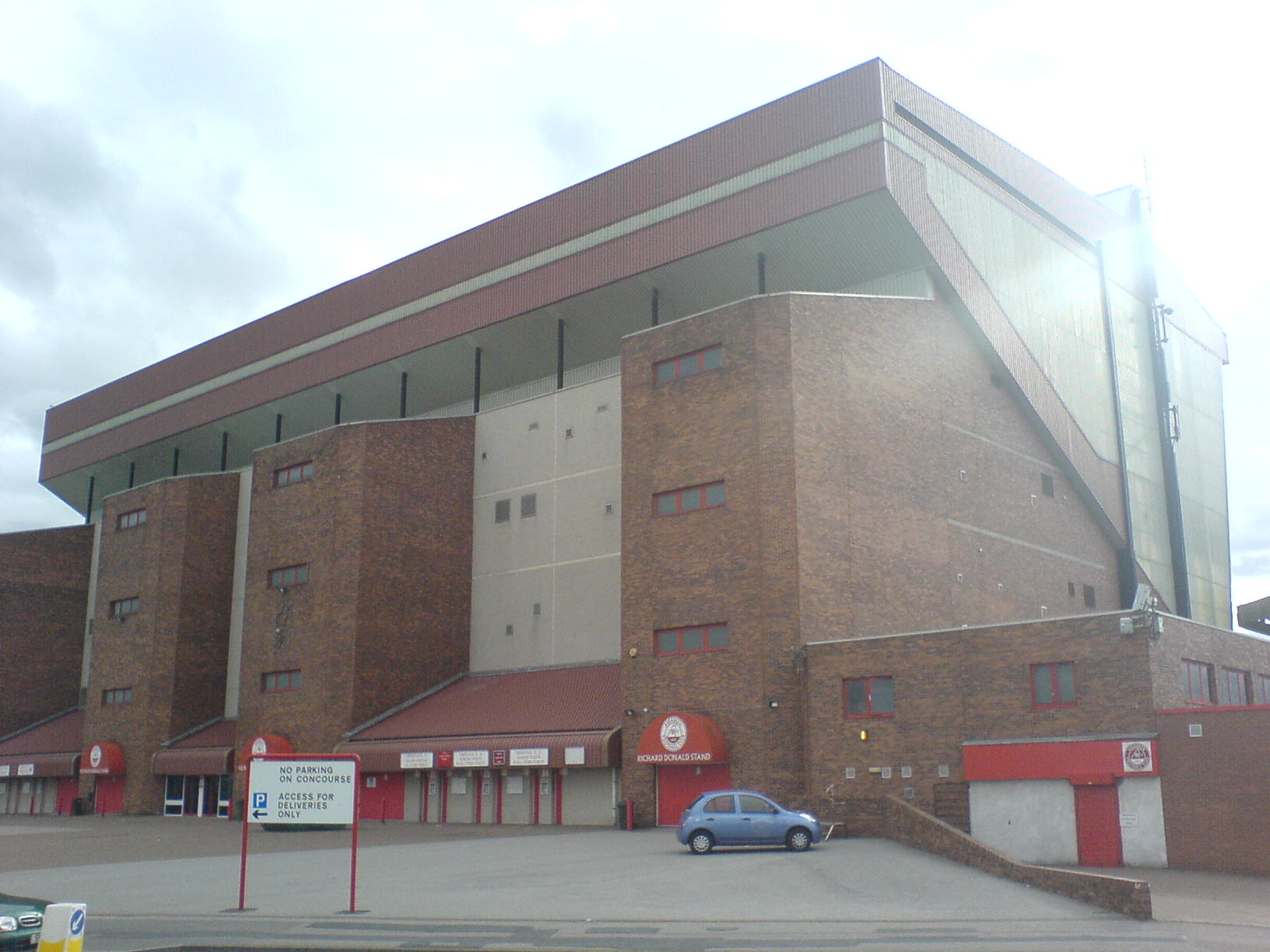
Rear view of the Dick Donald Stand

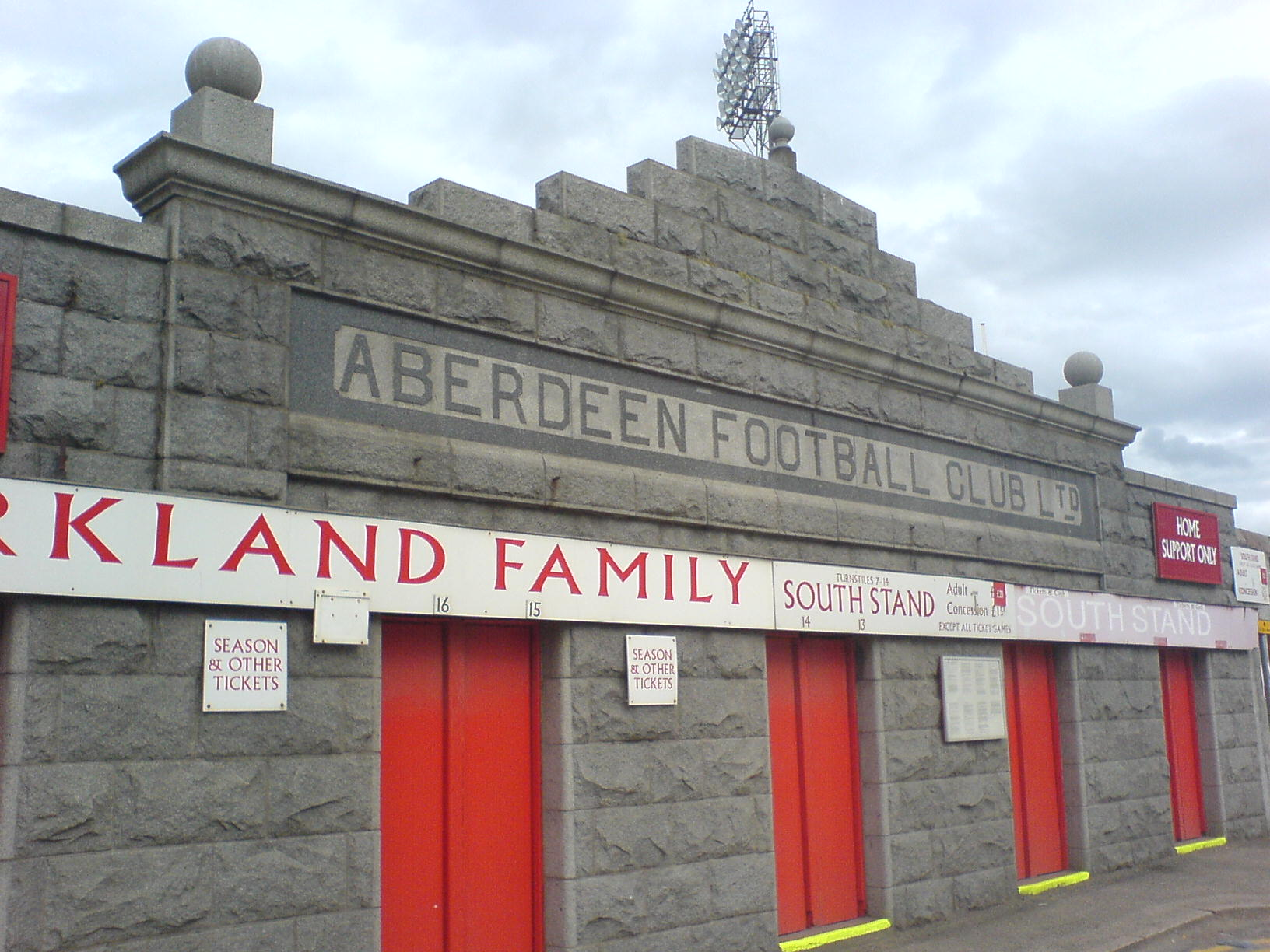
Detail of the granite façade of the Merkland Stand

The Main Stand was the original grandstand within the ground, and contains much of the staff and offices responsible for the day-to-day running of the stadium, from the boot room to the trophy room. Teams enter the pitch from a tunnel to the extreme left of this stand. As befits a main stand, this section of the ground includes both padded seating for club officials and VIPs, and several executive boxes at the rear. There are a number of pillars running along this stand, supporting the roof. As a consequence, views in some places are restricted. It remains, however, the most expensive stand from which to watch matches. To the east of the Main Stand is the club shop, which doubles as a ticket office.

The Richard Donald Stand is named after former club chairman Dick Donald. Completed in 1993, it houses over 6,000 fans, although this is a reduction on its Beach End predecessor. It is a cantilever construction with two tiers and a row of twelve executive boxes in between. It is commonly referred to as simply the "RDS". It was built by the present chairman's construction firm, the Stewart Milne Group, at a cost of £4.5 million. Within this stand are a number of banqueting rooms, which are used for corporate hospitality and outside bookings.

Taking its name from the street behind it, the Merkland Stand (also known as 'the Paddock' or 'King Street End') sits behind the goal, on the west of the ground. The Merkland is Aberdeen F.C.'s family stand, with reduced prices for under-twelves and families. There is also a section for disabled supporters near the pitch. The stand itself is a covered enclosure, with two pillars supporting the roof. The entrance to the stand is dominated by a façade constructed from granite, a local stone.

Named simply after its position within the ground, the South Stand was originally an undeveloped embankment which was later remodelled as a standing terrace. Seating and a cantilever roof were later added, although some of the 8,400 seats remain uncovered. Since 1993, the easternmost part of the stand has been used to house away fans. Sections P, Q and R are designated for this purpose. The television gantry and commentary positions are housed in this stand.

== Future developments ==
Despite improvements and its ground-breaking past, it appears that the future of Pittodrie as a football stadium is uncertain. Plans are in action for the club to move to a New Aberdeen Stadium. The principle of a move, rather than a redevelopment of Pittodrie, has already been recommended by Aberdeen City Council. An earlier plan to move to the edge of the city, which corresponded with Scotland's failed joint bid for the Euro 2008 tournament, was scrapped.

In June 2006, the club's two major shareholders agreed a plan to sell the land on which the stadium sits to clear some of the club's debt.

During the late 2010s, construction began at Kingsford on the western edge of the city which led to the completion of a new training facility, Cormack Park, in 2019; however, the proposed stadium on the same site was put on hiatus due to economic issues, and in 2021 alternative designs at the city's beachfront close to Pittodrie were released.

== Other uses ==
Since its construction, there have been fifteen Scotland international matches staged at Pittodrie. Normally the national team's home matches are played at Hampden Park in Glasgow, but during times of redevelopment of the national stadium, or matches which are expected to draw a low crowd, the Scottish Football Association has made use of other stadia in the country. Playing at Pittodrie, Scotland have won ten matches, drawn two and lost three. The most recent was a 1–0 loss to Netherlands on 9 November 2017.

3 February 1900	Scotland	5 – 2	Wales	1900 British Home Championship
	Bell 2'; D. Wilson 7', 35'; Hamilton 37'; Smith 60'		T.D. Parry; W.T. Butler	Attendance: 12,500; Referee: C.E. Sutcliffe (England)

12 February 1921	Scotland	2 – 1	Wales	1921 British Home Championship
	Wilson 11', 46'		D.J. Collier	Attendance: 20,824; Referee: J. Mason (England)

21 November 1935	Scotland	3 – 2	Wales	1936 British Home Championship
	Duncan 23'; C.E. Napier 46', 85'		C. Phillips 72'; D.J. Astley 88'	Attendance: 26,334; Referee: S. Thompson (Northern Ireland)

10 November 1937	Scotland	1 – 1	Ireland	1938 British Home Championship
	Smith 48'		P. Doherty	Attendance: 21,878; Referee: A.J. Jewell (England)

10 November 1971	Scotland	1 – 0	Belgium	1972 European Championship qualifier
	O'Hare 5'			Attendance: 36,500; Referee: Bostrom (Sweden)

16 May 1990	Scotland	1 – 3	Egypt	Friendly match
	McCoist 73'		Youssef 15'; Hassan 28'; Hamid 83'	Attendance: 23,000; Referee: Pedersen (Norway)

2 June 1993	Scotland	3 – 1	Estonia	1994 World Cup qualifier
	McClair 16'; Nevin 27', 72' (pen.)		Bragin 57'	Attendance: 14,307; Referee: Ouzounov (Bulgaria)

8 September 1993	Scotland	1 – 1	Switzerland	1994 World Cup qualifier
	Collins 50'		Bregy 69' (pen.)	Attendance: 15,000; Referee: Quiniou (France)

7 September 1997	Scotland	4 – 1	Belarus	1998 World Cup qualifier
	Gallacher 7', 58'; Hopkin 54', 88'		Katchouro 74' (pen.)	Attendance: 20,160; Referee: van der Ende (Netherlands)

14 October 1998	Scotland	2 – 1	Faroe Islands	2000 European Championship qualifier
	Dodds 21'; Burley 45'		Petersen 86' (pen.)	Attendance: 18,517; Referee: Kapitanis (Cyprus)

17 April 2002	Scotland	1 – 2	Nigeria	Friendly match
17:45	Dailly 7'	Report	Aghahowa 40', 69'	Attendance: 20,465; Referee: Øvrebø (Norway)

22 August 2007	Scotland	1 – 0	South Africa	Friendly match
20:00	Boyd 71'	Report		Attendance: 13,723; Referee: Atkinson (England)

16 November 2010	Scotland	3 – 0	Faroe Islands	Friendly match
20:00	Wilson 24'; Commons 31'; Mackie 45'	Report		Attendance: 15,064; Referee: van Boekel (Netherlands)

6 February 2013	Scotland	1 – 0	Estonia	Friendly match
19:45	Mulgrew 39'	Report		Attendance: 16,102; Referee: Turpin (France)

9 November 2017	Scotland	0 – 1	Netherlands	Friendly match
19:45		Report	Depay 40'	Attendance: 17,883; Referee: Buquet (France)

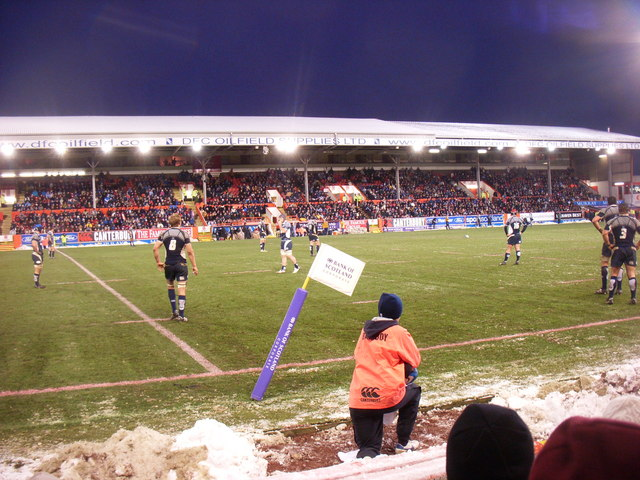
The Scotland national rugby union team playing at Pittodrie in November 2008.

=== Rugby union ===
Since 2005, Pittodrie has hosted four rugby union internationals.

Date	Country	Score	Country	Victor
24 May 2005	Scotland	38 – 9	Barbarians	Scotland
22 November 2008	Scotland	41 – 0	Canada	Scotland
27 November 2010	Scotland	19 – 16	Samoa	Scotland
24 November 2012	Scotland	15 – 21	Tonga	Tonga

=== Concerts ===
Pittodrie has been used for concerts; both Elton John and Rod Stewart have played at Pittodrie.

== See also ==
- Stadium relocations in Scottish football
- List of stadiums in the United Kingdom by capacity
- Lists of stadiums
