= Bucksburn Swimming Pool =

Swimming pool in Aberdeen, Scotland

Coordinates: 57°10′35.97″N 2°10′55.99″W

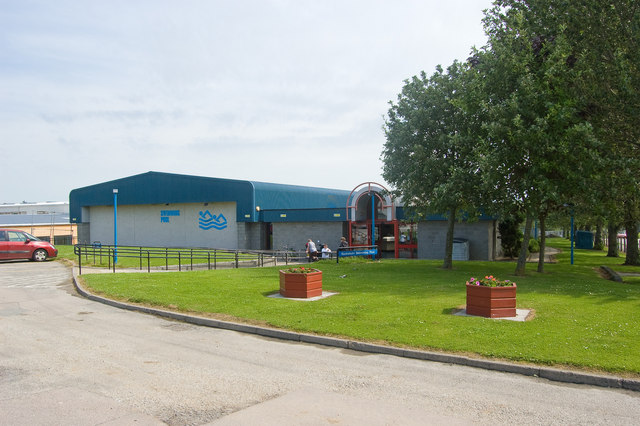
- Exterior of the pool
- Interactive map of Bucksburn Swimming Pool
- Location: Kepplehills Road, Bucksburn, Aberdeen
- Owner: Aberdeen City Council
- Operator: Sport Aberdeen

Construction
- Opened: 20 November 1989

Website
- www.sportaberdeen.co.uk/venues/bucksburn-swimming-pool

Bucksburn Swimming Pool is a swimming pool in Bucksburn, Aberdeen, Scotland.

== History ==
The swimming pool opened on 20 November 1989. It was built at a cost of £900,000.

On 2 March 2023, it was announced that the pool would close on 16 April 2023 along with the Beach Leisure Centre following a £687,000 reduction in the yearly budget for Sport Aberdeen. The council stated that there were "significant issues" with the plant that would cost over £400,000 to fix. It stated that the site where the pool stands would be required for an expansion of Bucksburn Academy.

In December 2023, following a council consultation on the decision to close the pool triggered by the widespread backlash due to the pool's closure it was announced that the pool would reopen. Initially £1m was allocated to reopening the pool. In September 2024, an additional £1.1m was approved.

== Facilities ==
The pool is 25 metres (82 feet) long and has five lanes.
