= Mountains Burn =

Stream in Aberdeenshire, Scotland

Coordinates: 57.504°N 2.734°W

Mountains Burn is a burn which marks the boundary of the parish of Huntly, Aberdeenshire, Scotland.
