= Knichtland Burn =

Stream in Aberdeenshire, Scotland

Location
- Country: Scotland

Physical characteristics
- Mouth
  - coordinates: 57.450612°N 2.730756°W

Knichtland Burn is a burn which marks the boundary of the parish of Huntly, Aberdeenshire, Scotland.
