= Beach Leisure Centre =

Leisure centre in Aberdeen, Scotland

Coordinates: 57°9′21.08″N 2°4′46.24″W

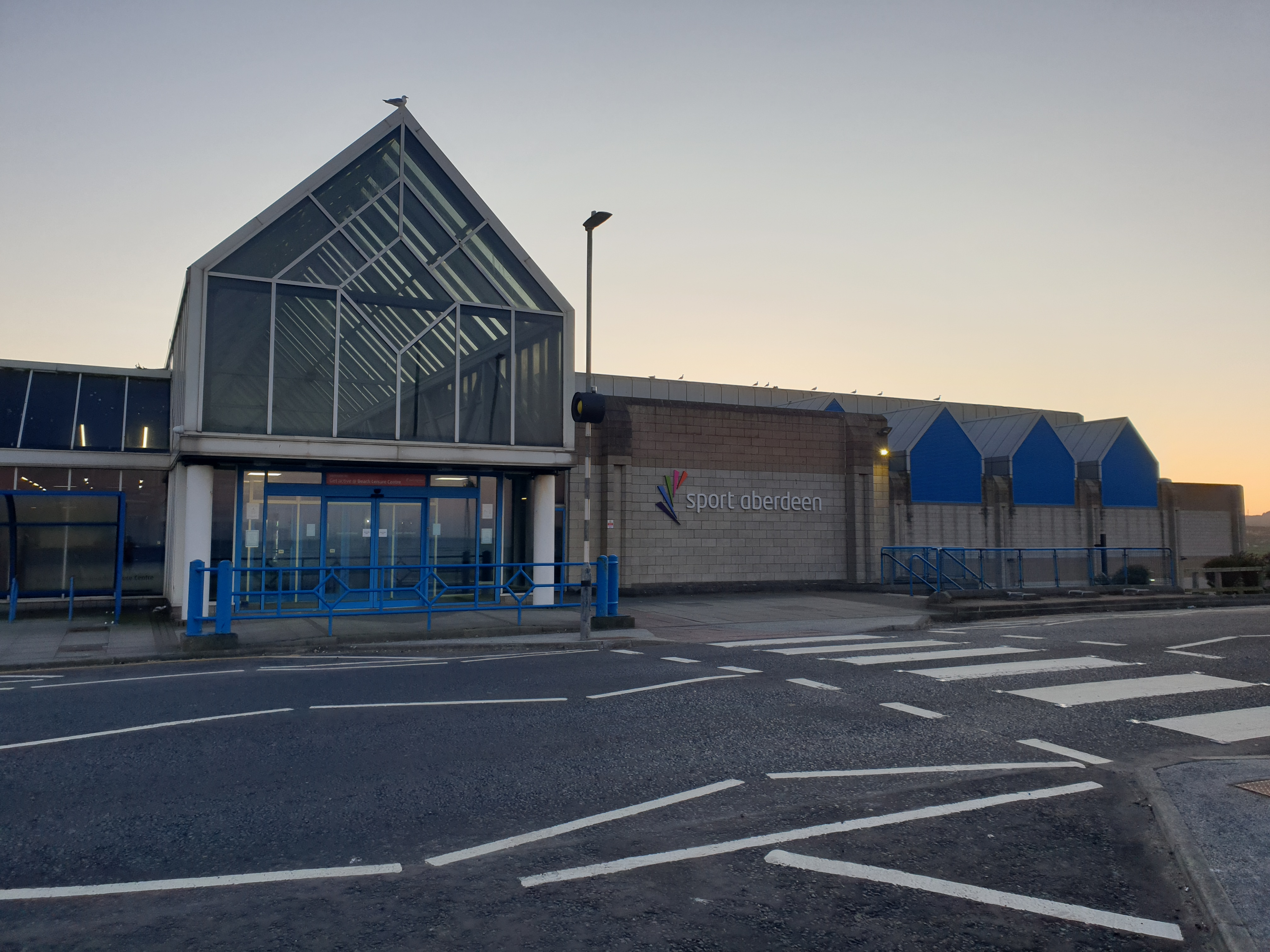
- Main entrance
- Interactive map of Beach Leisure Centre
- Location: Aberdeen Beach Front, Aberdeen
- Owner: Aberdeen City Council

Construction
- Opened: 1 March 1989 (building); 26 June 1989 (swimming pool)
- Closed: 21 August 2022 (swimming pool); 16 April 2023 (whole building)

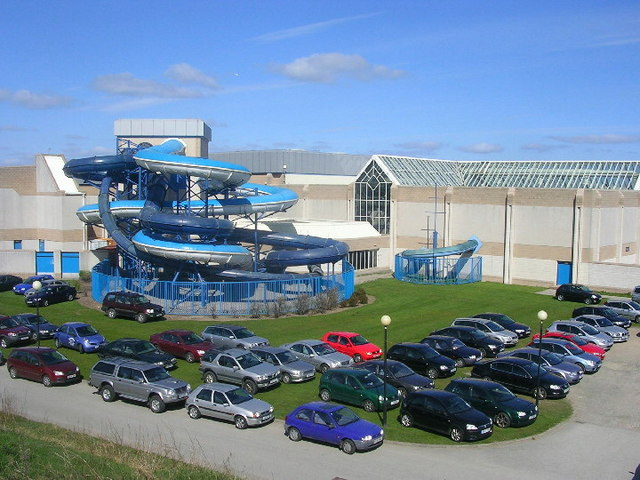
Rear of the Centre with flumes

The Beach Leisure Centre was a leisure centre located in Aberdeen, Scotland operated by Sport Aberdeen.

The building first opened in 1989 and closed on 16 April 2023, at the same time as Bucksburn Swimming Pool, after a £687,000 reduction in funding by Aberdeen City Council, following the closure of the leisure pool on 21 August 2022 due to an increase in energy costs. It was situated adjacent to Linx Ice Arena and Aberdeen Beach Ballroom, a category B listed building.

The Beach Leisure Centre was demolished as part of the £150m City Centre/Beach Masterplan.

== History ==
A leisure centre at the beach was being discussed by the council as early as 1979. Construction began in 1986 and the leisure centre opened on 1 March 1989, with the swimming pool opening 4 months later on 26 June. The centre was initially operated by Crossland Leisure.

The flumes were closed since the COVID-19 pandemic due to their poor condition. In May 2022, Sport Aberdeen announced that the pool would close on 21 August after the summer school holidays as a cost saving measure due to high energy prices. It stated that the situation would be reviewed and the pool could reopen in summer 2023.

On 2 March 2023, the council announced that the leisure centre would close permanently on 16 April 2023, along with Bucksburn Swimming Pool due to a £687,000 reduction in its yearly budget for Sport Aberdeen. The council stated that a new beachfront facility was planned.

In late 2025, the leisure centre was demolished.

== Facilities ==
The building was physically connected to the Beach Ballroom. The Beach Leisure Centre contained a swimming pool and a gym. There were three flumes:

- The Tube - a 120 metre long flume where riders sit on inflatable rafts
- Wipeout - a short, steep flume
- The Pipeline - a 95 metre long flume

== Incident ==
On 11 August 2011, a 12-year-old boy fractured his right ankle and shinbone after colliding with a wall at the end of the Wipeout flume. The incident occurred because there was insufficient water in the trough to slow the boy down at the end of the ride. Sport Aberdeen was fined £8,000 as a result of the incident.
