= Bucksburn =

Suburb of Aberdeen, Scotland

Coordinates: 57.177°N 2.175°W

- Town
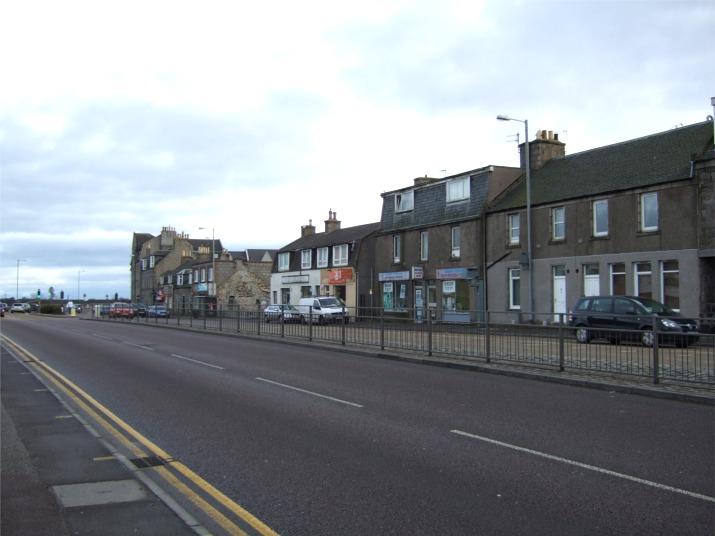
- The A96 where it runs through Bucksburn.

- Location within the Aberdeen City council area Location within Scotland
- Population: 8,572
- Language: English; Polish; Spanish
- OS grid reference: NJ 89114 09715
  - Cardiff: 396 km (246 mi)
  - London: 646 km (401 mi)
- Council area: Aberdeen City
- Lieutenancy area: Aberdeen
- Country: Scotland
- Sovereign state: United Kingdom
- Post town: Aberdeen
- Postcode district: AB21 9
- Dialling code: 01224
- Police: Scotland
- Fire: Scottish
- Ambulance: Scottish
- UK Parliament: Aberdeen North
- Scottish Parliament: Aberdeen Donside

Bucksburn is a suburb of Aberdeen, Scotland, named after the stream that flows through it. The stream is called Bucks Burn. Bucksburn was formerly a market village before being swallowed up by the spread of the city. The area is bordered by countryside, in particular Kirkhill Forest and the land surrounding Brimmond Hill.

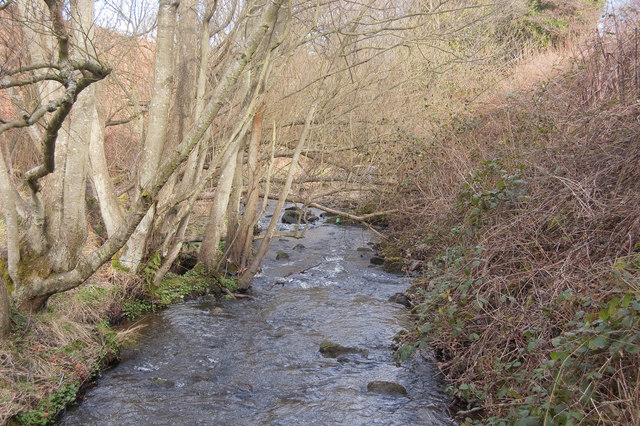
The burn that flows through the town

Bucksburn was one of the first established villages in Aberdeen, in the time of the Harrying of Buchan in 1308, when Robert the Bruce was present in Aberdeen.

== History ==
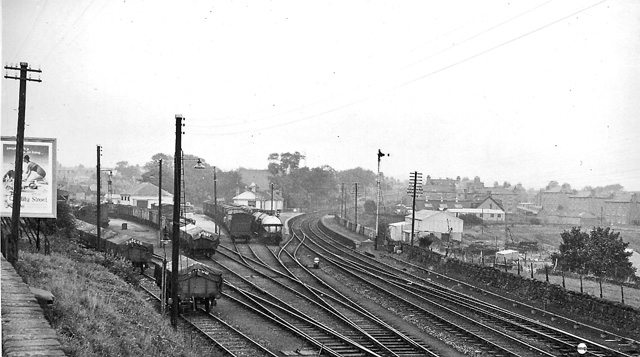
The old station and goods yard in 1961

Bucksburn railway station served the area from 1854 to 1956. The line it was on still exists as the Aberdeen–Inverness line.

Bucksburn & District Pipe Band, formed in 1947, has represented Aberdeen internationally and were Champion of Champions in 1998 and 1999 at their grade. The youth section won the Scottish, British, and World Champions titles in 2008.

When WWI started many soldiers from Bucksburn went. There is a memorial in memory of those who were lost in the war located on Kepplehills Road.

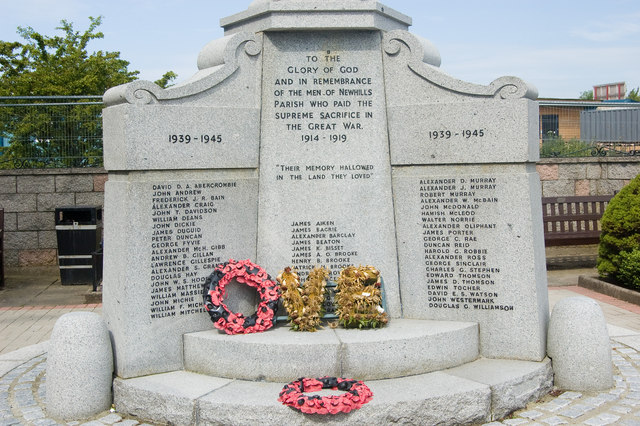
The memorial in 2005

The area is home to P&J Live, which opened in late 2019. P&J Live (also known as TECA) is a multi-purpose indoor arena in the suburb of Bucksburn, Aberdeen. Opened in August 2019, it offers a capacity for all types of shows and events from 5,000 to 15,000. Replacing the former Aberdeen Exhibition and Conference Centre (AECC), the 10,000-seat arena is used for concerts and other events. It is the largest indoor arena in Scotland, and the fifth largest arena in the United Kingdom.

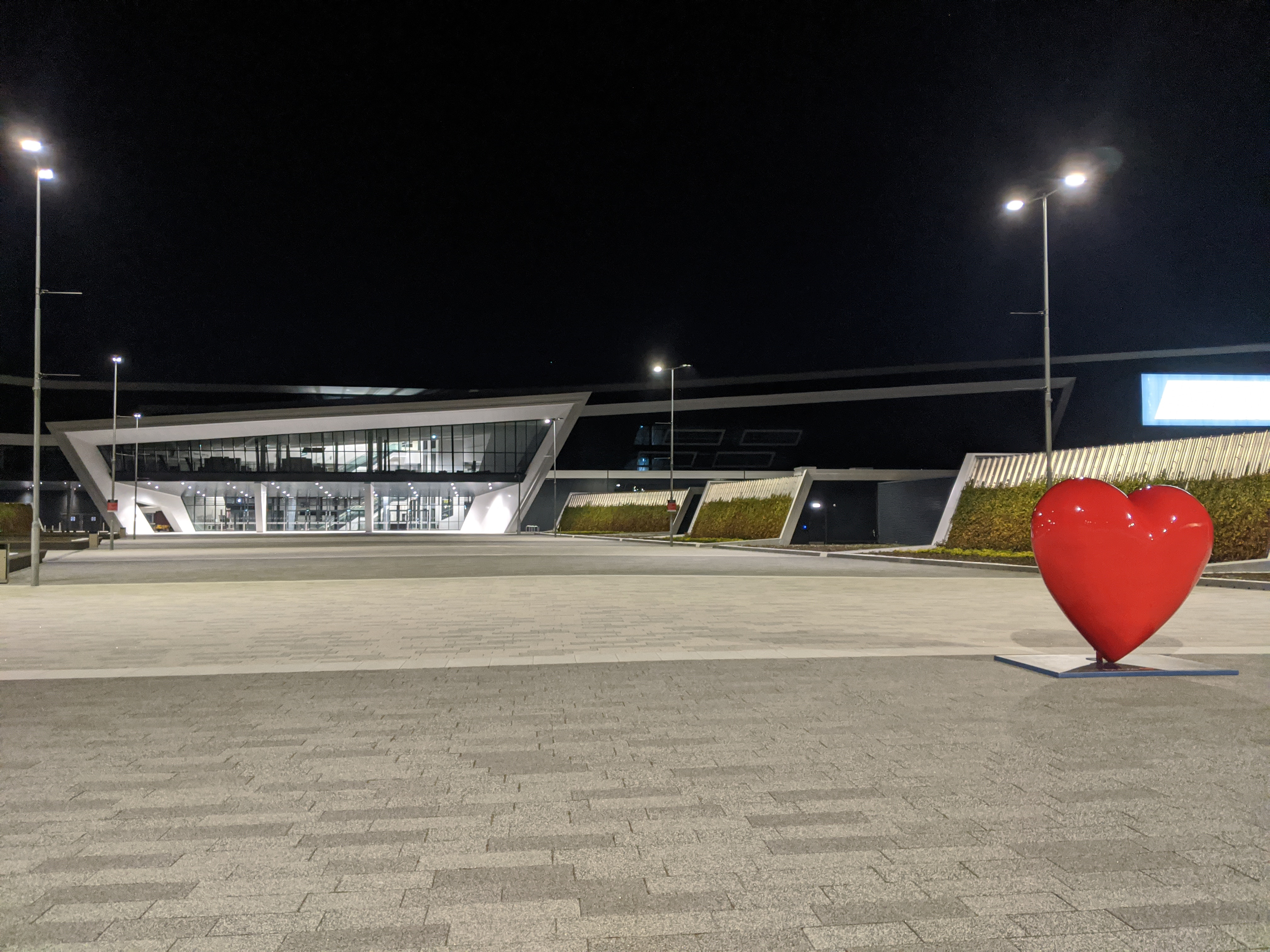
The TECA at night

There are five parks in Bucksburn: Cloverfield, Inverurie Road, Stoneyton park, Cruikshank park and Brimmond.

Today, "Brighter Bucksburn" works as a sub-group of Bucksburn and Newhills Community Council, to maintain plots and planters throughout the area, and help develop and maintain Cloverfield Park, formerly a waste ground which now has seating, planters and rose-beds. A planned wildflower area to be planted by school pupils was delayed owing to the pandemic.

== Historical Landmarks ==
- Bucksburn War memorial
- March Stones 44-48 ABD
- Newhills Parish Church
- Old Parish Church
- Workers Memorial
- Newhills Ave dirt road

== Education ==
The area has one secondary school, Bucksburn Academy (which opened in 2009, along with the Beacon Centre). It also has a primary school, Brimmond School, which was built in late 2015 after the merger of the previous schools: Bucksburn Primary and Newhills.

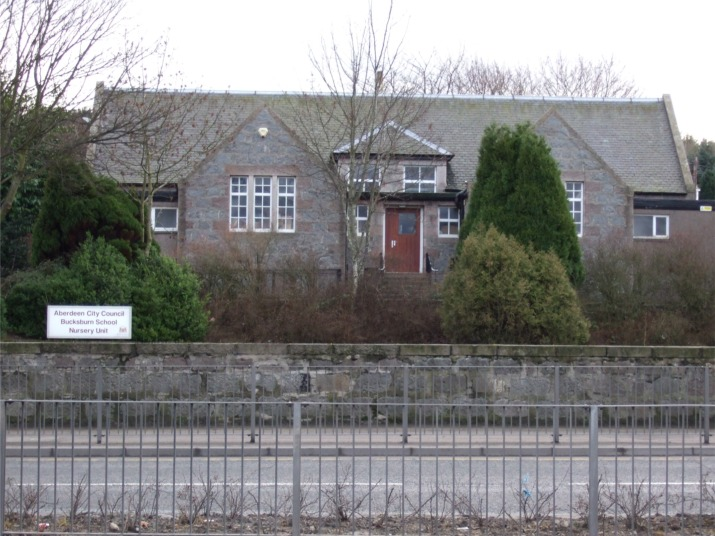
The old Bucksburn nursery

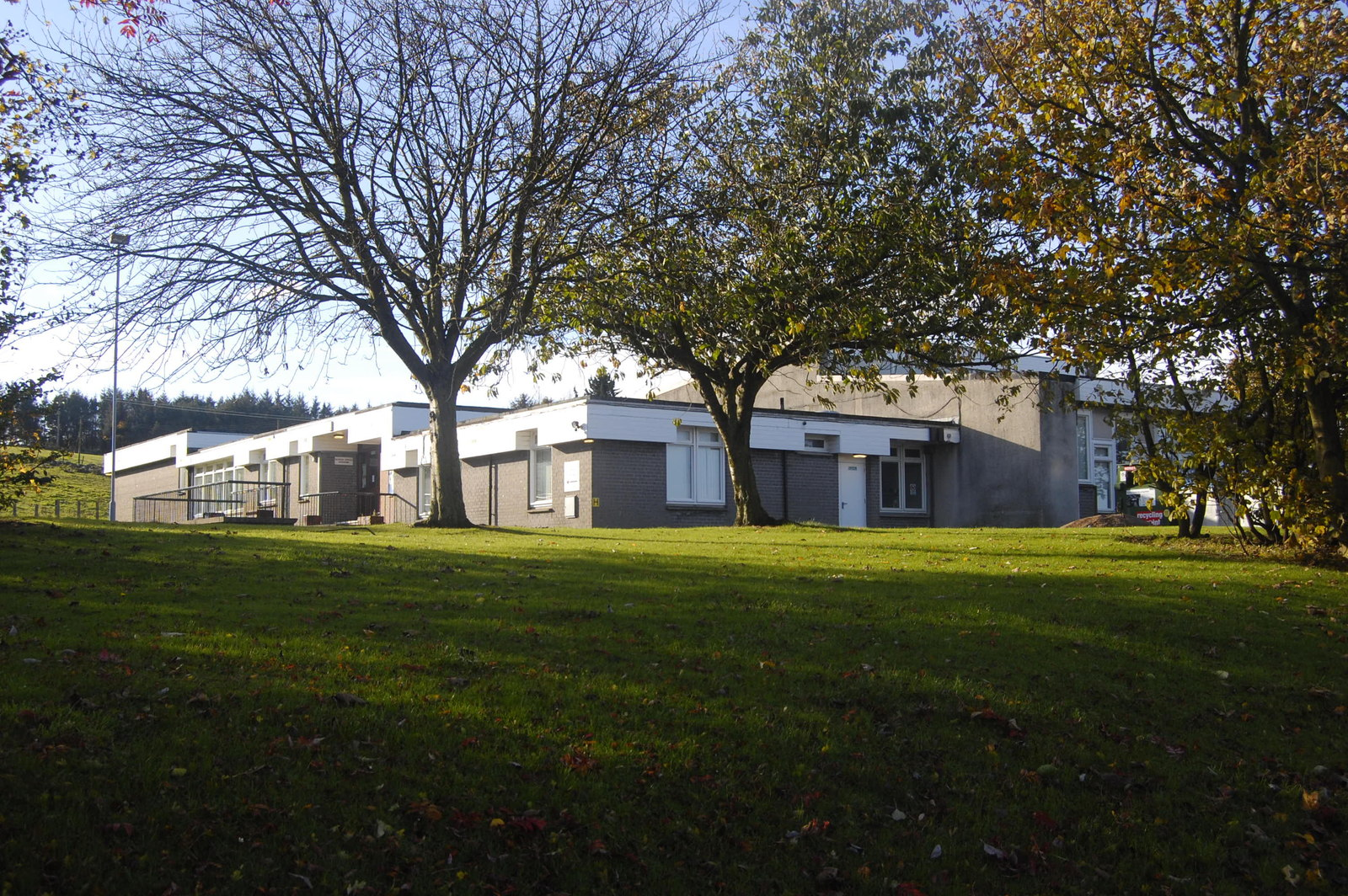
The old Bucksburn primary school

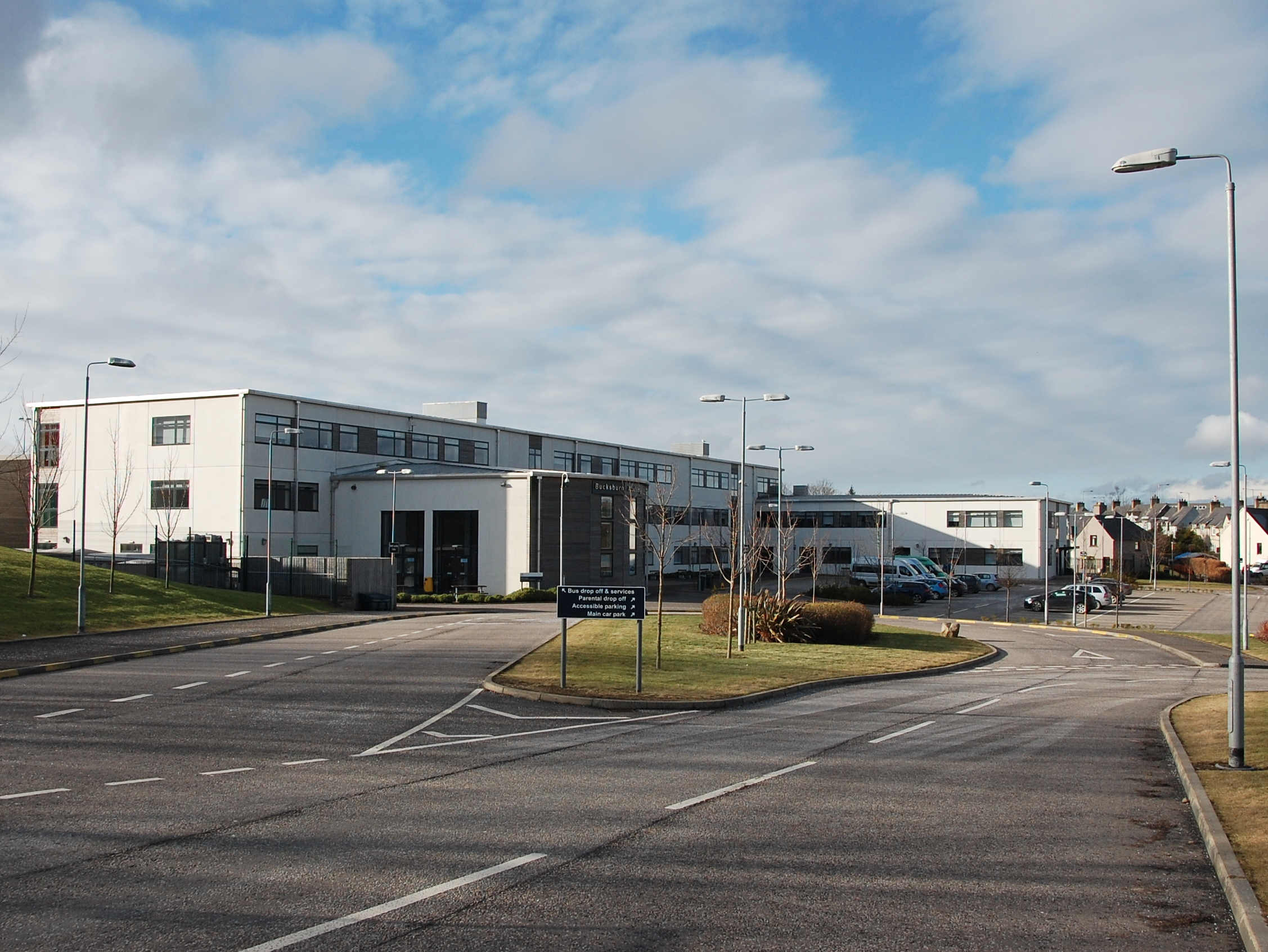
Bucksburn Academy

== Sports ==
Bucksburn Swimming Pool operated from 1989 to 2023.

=== Football ===
Bucksburn is host to a few football teams which include Bucksburn Utd, Bucksburn Thistle, Bucksburn Boys and Bucksburn Academy. There are two Astro turfs which belong to Brimmond School and Bucksburn Academy.

== Notable people ==
- Chris Anderson (1925-1986), Scottish footballer, educator and football administrator
- Oswald Chambers (1874–1917), Baptist
- Percy Dickie (1907–1987), Scottish footballer, inside forward, left half
- Alexander Ewing (1814–1873), Scottish church leader.
- Simon Farquhar, writer, broadcaster
- Juliet-Jane Horne, model
- Denis Law (born 1940) former Scottish footballer, forward
- Willie Moir (1922–1988), Scottish footballer, Bolton Wanderers, inside-right
- Kirsty Muir (born 2004), Olympic freestyle skier, silver medalist 2022
- Sir Ian Wood (born 1942), businessman and philanthropist
