= Transition Extreme =

Sports facility in Queens Links, Aberdeen

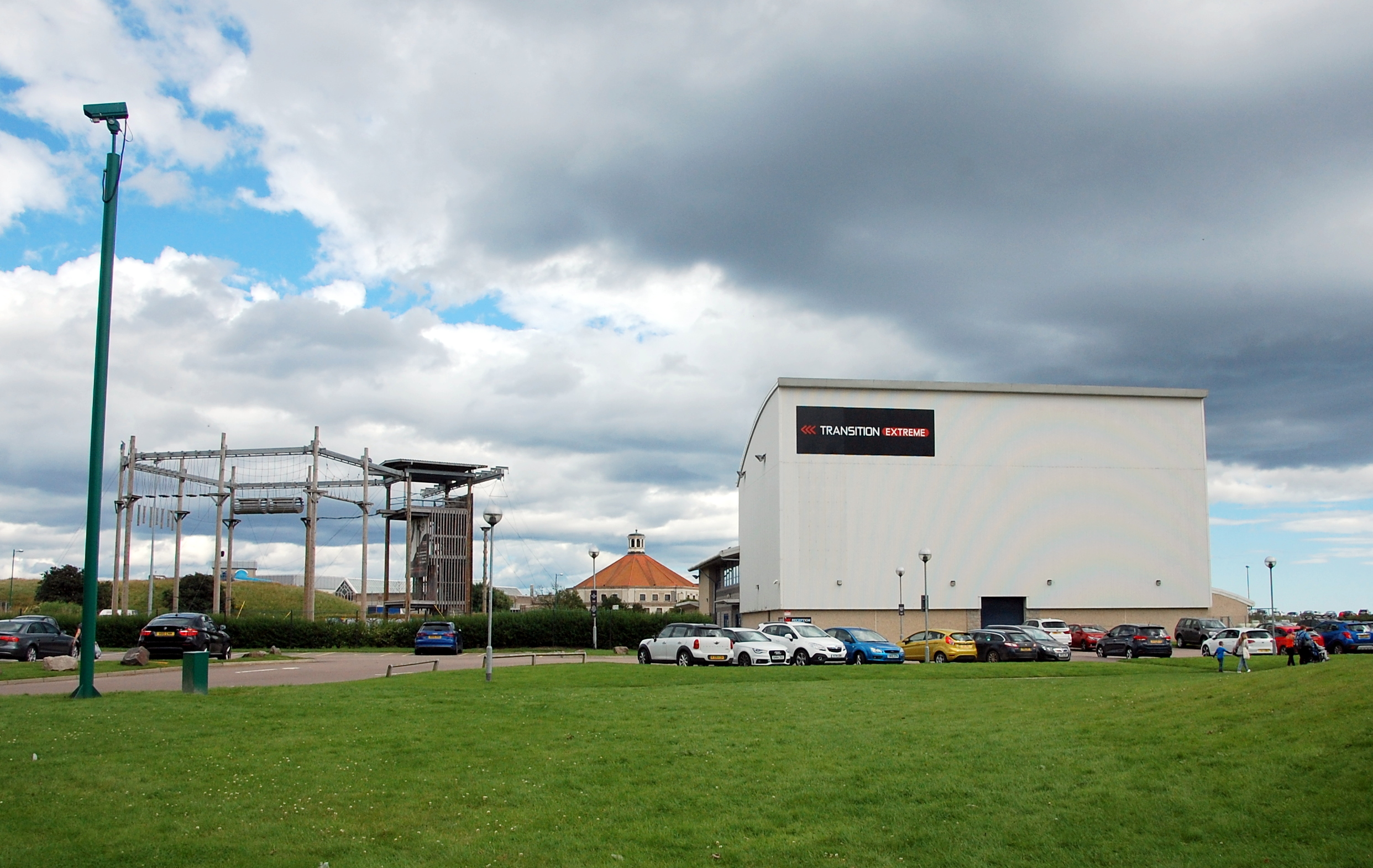
- Interactive map of Transition Extreme
- Address: Aberdeen; Scotland
- Coordinates: 57°9′15.19″N 2°4′54.08″W

Construction
- Groundbreaking: 2006
- Opened: 2007
- Cost: £2.7 million

Website
- transition-extreme.com

Transition Extreme is a sports facility in Queens Links, Aberdeen. It is run by a charity.

== History ==
Rope course

Construction on the facility began in April 2006.

The idea for Transition Skatepark and Extreme Sports Centre was conceived by Mr Neil Stevenson while he and his family lived in Houston, Texas between 2001-2003. Both of Mr Stevenson's children are avid skateboarders and, while in the US, had access to the world-class facilities offered by VANS skate parks and others. On returning to Aberdeen the subject of skateboarding facilities was extremely high profile with Aberdeen City Council, with several outdoor and temporary parks under discussion and a formal consultation underway between the Council and local enthusiasts. In addition, a temporary outdoor skate park erected at the beach during the summers of 2001-2003 had enjoyed tremendous attendance – with approximately 4000 visitors attending during 2003.

The idea of an integrated extreme sports centre was developed following the review of the Council's formal Community Plan – which clearly sets out the objectives for the city and its citizens – together with discussions with the Visit Aberdeenshire/Visitscotland. Thus the idea of year round indoor facilities for both climbing and skateboarding/BMX was developed, as well as providing a “shop window” for the other extreme sports and tremendous facilities of the North East of Scotland. They are continuing to build on this idea as part of the Scottish Enterprise and Opportunity North East project in 2022 and beyond.

It was officially opened in May 2007 by Prince Andrew, Duke of York, though the centre opened to the public the previous month. A ropes course was added later.

In 2021, Aberdeen City Council proposed that the planned Aberdeen stadium could be built at the beach, perhaps occupying where Transition Extreme stands today, as well as the nearby closed DoubleTree Hilton hotel.

== Facilities ==
The centre, which cost £2.7 million to build, contains a skatepark, a climbing wall, and a cafe, all situated indoors. A ropes course is situated outdoors.
