= Alexander Wedderburn =

Alexander Wedderburn may refer to:

- Sir Alexander Wedderburn (1610–1676), Scottish politician.
- Alexander Wedderburn, 1st Earl of Rosslyn (1733–1805), Scottish noble
- Alexander Wedderburn (businessman) (1796–1843), Scottish-Canadian businessman
- Zander Wedderburn (Alexander Allan Innes Wedderburn) (1935–2017), Scottish psychologist
