= Bucks Burn =

Stream in Aberdeen, Scotland

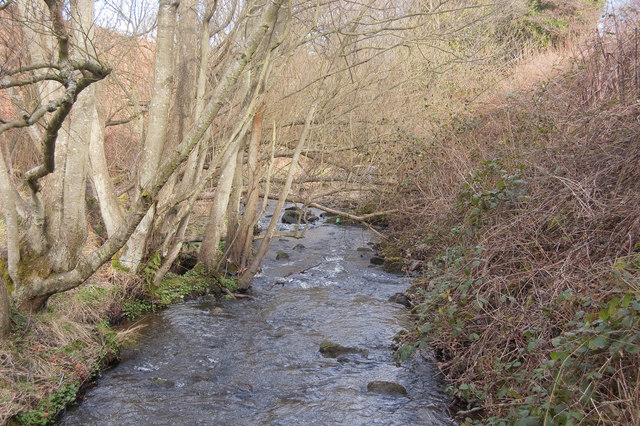
- The burn

Location
- Country: Scotland

Physical characteristics
- Mouth: River Don
  - location: Aberdeen City council area
  - coordinates: 57.17949°N 2.16044°W

The Bucks Burn is a stream in Aberdeen which flows into the River Don. It lends its name to the former town of Bucksburn which is now part of Aberdeen City council area.
