= Bucksburn Academy =

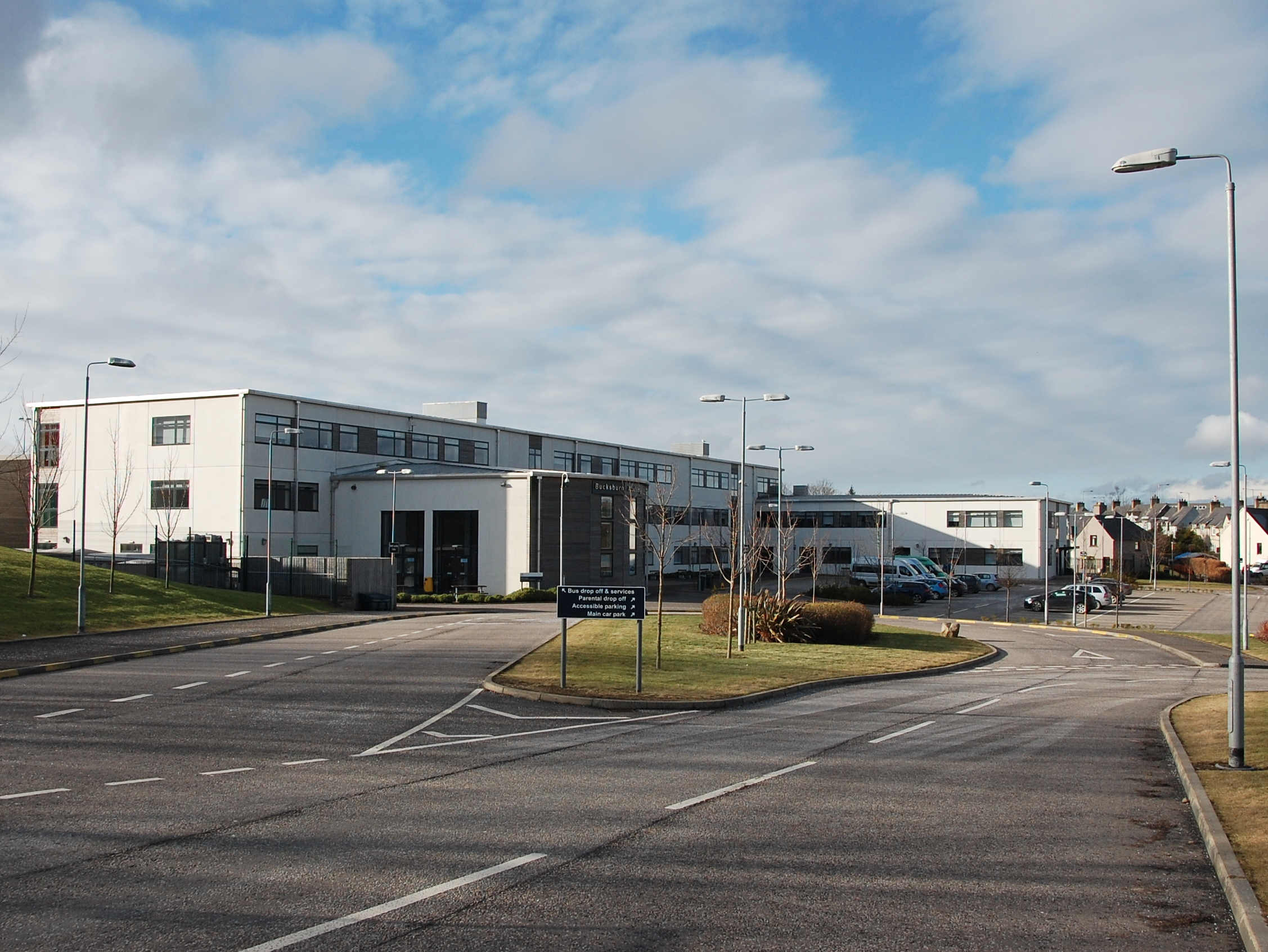
- The exterior of the school in February 2016.

Location
- Kepplehills Road; Bucksburn, Aberdeen, AB21 9DG; Scotland; 57.1775°N 2.1822°W

Information
- Type: Secondary school
- Motto: 'Together we achieve'
- Established: October 2009
- Local authority: Aberdeen City Council
- Head teacher: Mike Paul
- Staff: 80 (approx)
- Gender: Co-educational
- Age: 11 to 18
- Enrolment: 1,100
- Houses: Alba Caledonia Ecosse Scotia Pictavia
- Colours: Black and gold
- School years: S1-S6
- Website: Bucksburn Academy

Bucksburn Academy is the only state secondary school in Bucksburn, a suburb/town in Aberdeen, Scotland serving as the sole provider of secondary education. Bucksburn Academy's catchment area includes the suburbs of Bucksburn, Newhills and Kingswells, though some pupils do attend from other nearby areas, such as Stoneywood and Dyce.

The school has a dedicated Additional Support Wing which has capacity for 96 children. The Wing is a city-wide provision that provides education for children with moderate to severe and complex additional support needs.

The languages taught at the school are French and Spanish.

Bucksburn Academy opened in late October 2009 and replaced the existing Bankhead Academy. The new school had some of the greatest facilities in Scotland, rivalling only those of Cults Academy in the city.

== Houses ==
Bucksburn Academy has four houses each named after Scotland in different languages: Alba (green), Caledonia (blue), Scotia (red) and Ecosse (purple).
