= Beach Ballroom =

Art deco building on the beach boulevard of Aberdeen, Scotland

Coordinates: 57.1553°N 2.0798°W

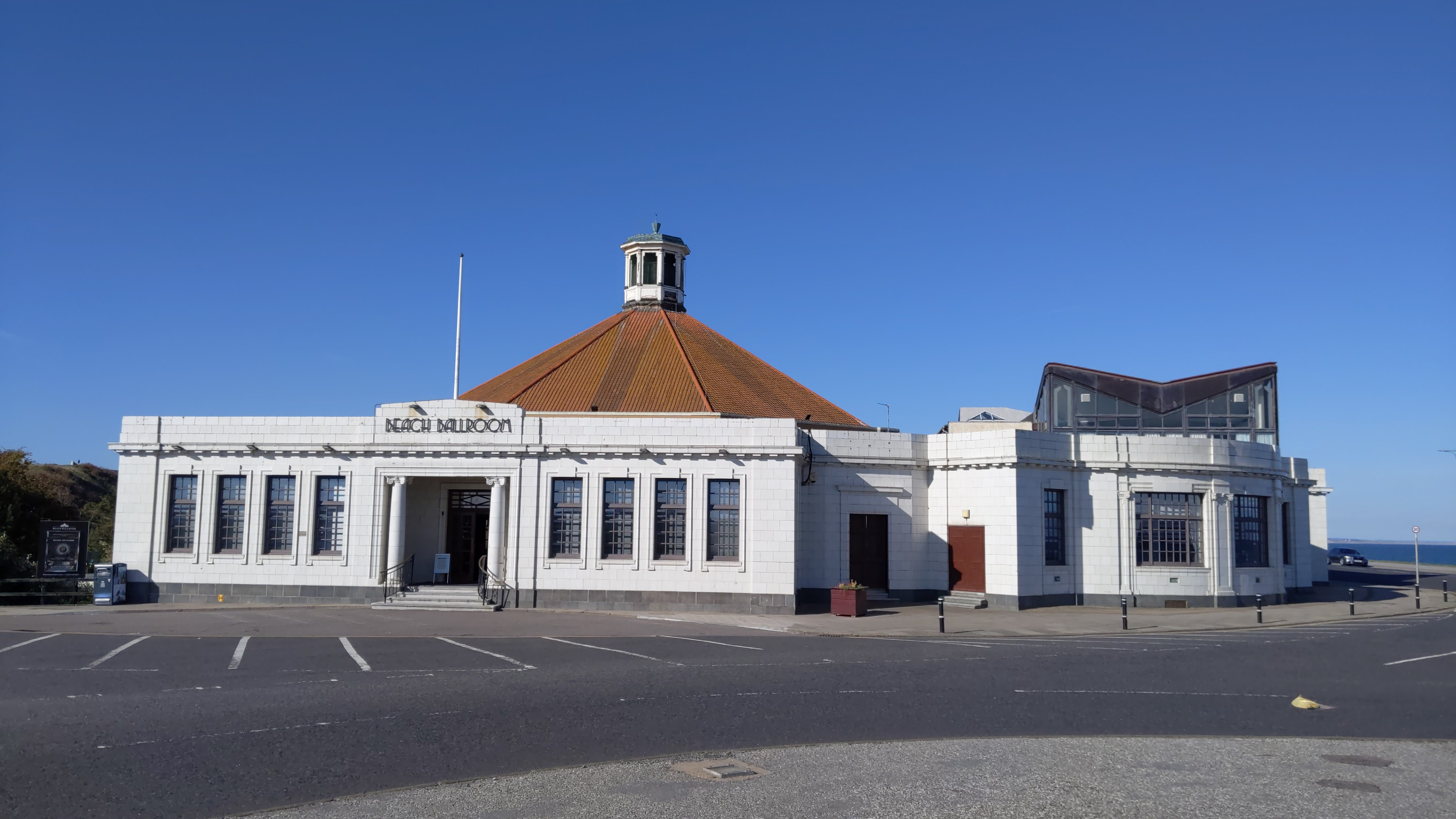
- Front of the Beach Ballroom
- Interactive map of Beach Ballroom
- Location: Beach Promenade, Aberdeen, Scotland
- Owner: Aberdeen City Council
- Operator: Aberdeen City Council
- Capacity: 1,000 (Main Ballroom); 150 (Star Ballroom); 100 (Northern Lights Room); 50 (Promenade Room)
- Type: Multi-purpose venue
- Events: Concerts, sporting events, dinner dances, weddings, conferences, corporate events, weddings

Construction
- Opened: 3 May 1929
- Renovated: 1970s
- Expanded: 1963
- Cost: £50,000
- Architects: Thomas Roberts and Hume

Website
- Beach Ballroom Website

Listed Building – Category B
- Official name: Beach Ballroom
- Designated: 12 January 1967
- Reference no.: LB20314

The Beach Ballroom is an art deco building on the beach boulevard of Aberdeen, Scotland. It was built in 1926 and opened on 3 May 1929. It is a Category B listed building and has been noted for its dance floor which is supported by 1,400 steel springs.

Famous acts to appear at the Beach Ballroom include the Beatles, Pink Floyd, the Who, the Small Faces, Cream, Joe Loss, Ken Mackintosh and more recently the Ordinary Boys and Twin Atlantic. Like many buildings in Aberdeen, it is made from granite.

The Beach Ballroom is owned and operated by Aberdeen City Council and has a webcam that faces south along the beach towards Footdee. The Ballroom is connected to the more modern Beach Leisure Centre via an indoor walkway.

The main dance hall is octagonal and originally had a domed ceiling, though this has since been covered over with a suspended ceiling. The smaller Star Ballroom extension was opened in June 1963.

The Ballroom underwent a refurbishment from 2008 to April 2010.

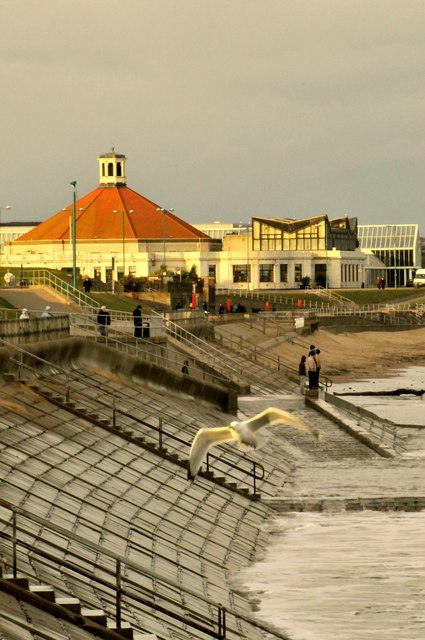
Looking up the beachfront to the Beach Ballroom
