= David Wedderburn =

David Wedderburn may refer to:

- David Wedderburn (writer) (1580–1646), Master of Aberdeen Grammar School
- Sir David Wedderburn, 1st Baronet (1775–1858), Scottish Member of Parliament for Perth Burghs
- Sir David Wedderburn, 3rd Baronet (1835–1882), Scottish Member of Parliament for South Ayrshire 1868–1874 and for Haddington Burghs 1879–1882

See also

Ogilvy-Wedderburn Baronets
