= James Wedderburn =

James Wedderburn may refer to:

- James Wedderburn (poet) (c. 1495–1553), Scottish poet
- James Wedderburn (bishop) (1585–1639), Scottish prelate
- James Wedderburn-Colville (1739–1807) West Indies plantation and slave owner, and father of
  - James Wedderburn (judge) (1782–1822), Solicitor General for Scotland
- Jim Wedderburn (born 1938), Barbados athlete
