= Aberdeen Beach and Queens Links =

Beach in Aberdeen, Scotland

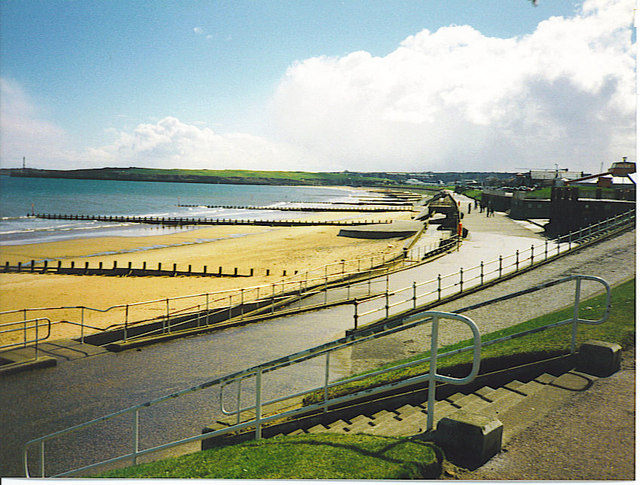
- View from the Esplanade to the sands
- Interactive map of Aberdeen Beach and Queens Links
- Type: Public Beach and Park
- Location: Aberdeen, Scotland
- Coordinates: 57°9′11″N 2°4′38″W
- Operator: Aberdeen City Council
- Open: All year

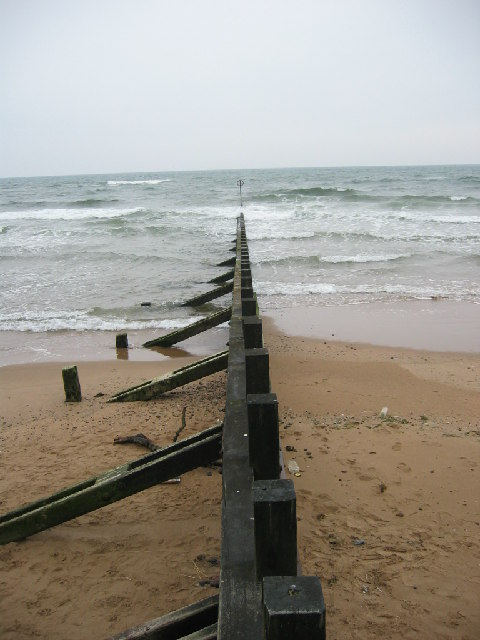
One of the many groynes that protect the beach from sand erosion

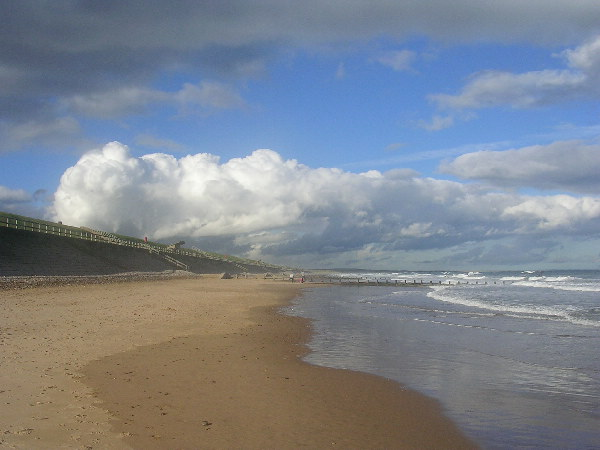
View along the beach across the sands

Aberdeen Beach and Queens Links is a coastal area in Aberdeen, Scotland, comprising a sandy beach and the adjacent public park known as Queens Links. The beach extends in a broad curve between Aberdeen Harbour and the mouth of the River Don.

The beach experiences ongoing coastal erosion and is protected by a series of groynes designed to retain sand. It is a popular location for walking and water sports, including surfing and windsurfing.

In the early 21st century, sections of the beach underwent a large-scale sand replenishment programme, during which sand was transported by ship from sites further south along the coast and deposited on the beach. Rock armour was also installed in V-shaped formations offshore as part of wider coastal erosion management measures.

The parkland element of the area is known as Queens Links and consists of a large open grassy space running parallel to the shoreline. It is used for informal recreation and outdoor activities, including kite sports during periods of strong coastal winds. A public golf course, Kings Links, is also located within the park.

== History ==
An indoor bathing station, known as the Beach Baths, was located opposite the Beach Ballroom. Designed by the city architect John Rust, it opened in 1898 and remained in operation until 1972, after which the building was demolished.

== Attractions ==
Queens Links Leisure Park is located within the area and includes shops, restaurants, and a 9-screen Cineworld cinema, which originally opened under the Virgin Cinemas brand. Adjacent to the leisure park is Codona's Amusement Park.

Further north along the boulevard are several venues, including the Beach Ballroom, the adjoining Beach Leisure Centre with swimming facilities, and the Linx Ice Arena. The area is also home to the outdoor sports facility Transition Extreme.

The Beach Boulevard retail park is also situated within the area. It was purchased from Abrdn by Realty Income in February 2022.

== Transportation ==
Aberdeen Corporation Tramways previously operated a line to the Queen's Links. The area is now accessible by bus. Previously, the beach, Footdee, and the retail park were served by a loop on route 15; however, changes to bus routes in July 2022 meant that the beach and Footdee were no longer served. Route 13 now calls at the Beach Retail Park.

The Beach Esplanade runs along the coast from Queen's Links in the south to Kings Street in the north. In August 2020, a cycle lane was installed on the beach esplanade with funding from the Scottish Government's Spaces for People initiative. However, Aberdeen City Council removed the cycle lane in December 2020.

== See also ==
- Green spaces and walkways in Aberdeen
