= Burn (landform) =

Term of Scottish origin for a small river

Views of Usway Burn
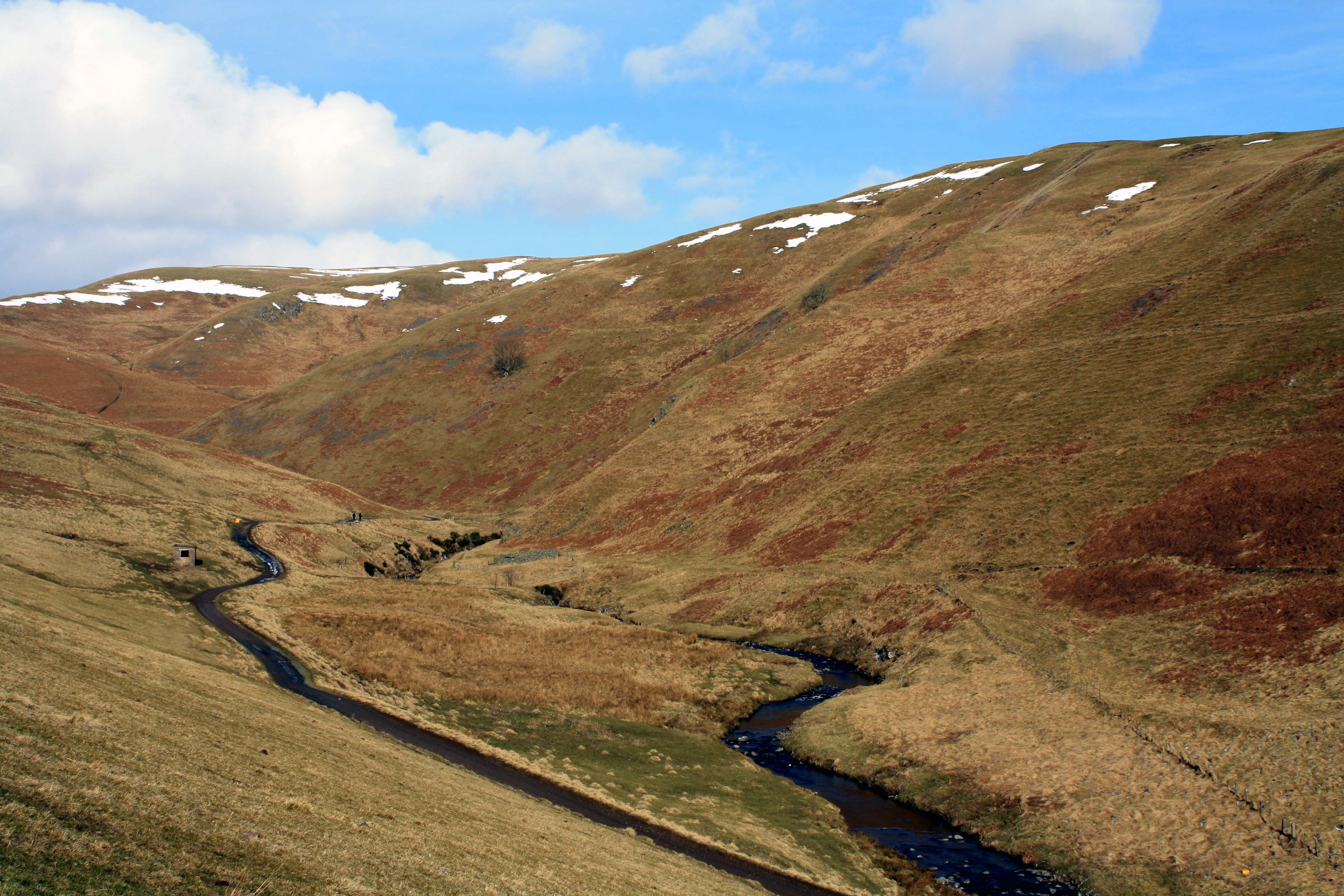
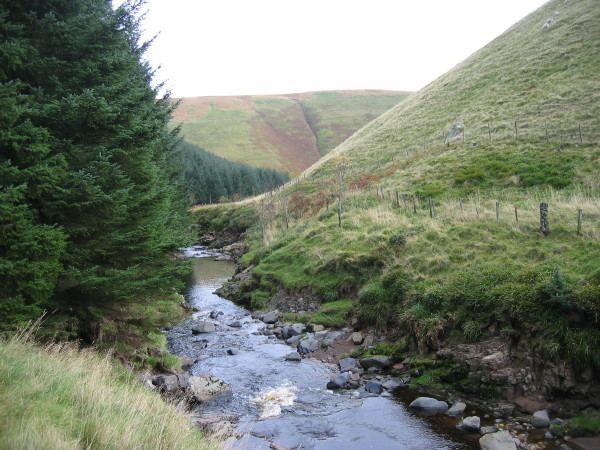
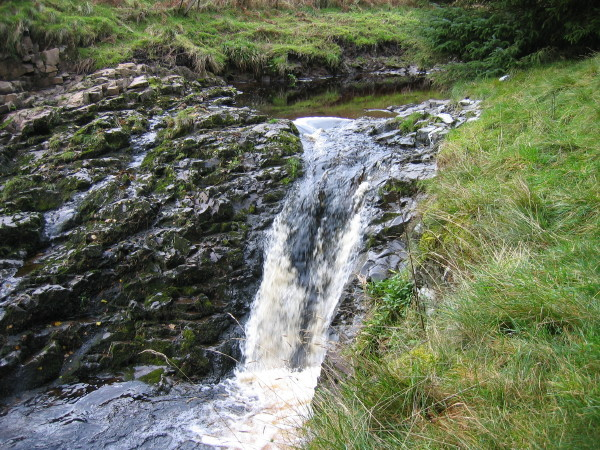
Usway Burn is a tributary of River Coquet in Northumberland

In local usage, a burn is a kind of watercourse. The term applies to a large stream or a small river. The word is used in Scotland and England (especially North East England) and in parts of Ulster, Kansas, Australia and New Zealand.

== Etymology ==
The cognate of burn in standard English is "bourn", "bourne", "borne", "born", which is retained in placenames like Bournemouth, King's Somborne, Holborn, Melbourne. A cognate in German is Born (contemp. Brunnen), meaning "well", "spring" or "source", which is retained in placenames like Paderborn in Germany. Both the English and German words derive from the same Proto-Germanic root.

Scots Gaelic has the word bùrn, also cognate, but which means "fresh water"; the actual Gaelic for a "burn" is allt (sometimes anglicised as "ault" or "auld" in placenames.

French also uses Bourne or Borne in watercourse names, e.g. in Gorges de la Bourne.

== Examples ==
- Blackburn
- Broxburn
- Bucks Burn
- Burnside
- Braid Burn
- Dighty Burn
- Burn Dale, East Donegal
- Burnfoot, Inishowen
- Burn of Elsick
- Burn of Pheppie
- Burn of Muchalls
- Bannockburn
- Crawfordsburn
- Cronaniv Burn, Gaoth Dobhair
- Gisburn
- Hebburn
- Jordan Burn
- Kilburn (disambiguation)
- Lyburn
- Ouseburn
- Roseburn
- Routeburn Track
- Saltburn-by-the-Sea
- Seaburn
- Seaton Burn
- Shirburn
- Tedburn
- Tyburn
- Wedderburn
- Westburn
- Whitburn
- Whitlawburn
- Winkburn
- Winterburn
- Wooburn
