= Linx Ice Arena =

Ice rink in Aberdeen, Scotland

Coordinates: 57°9′23.37″N 2°4′51.3″W

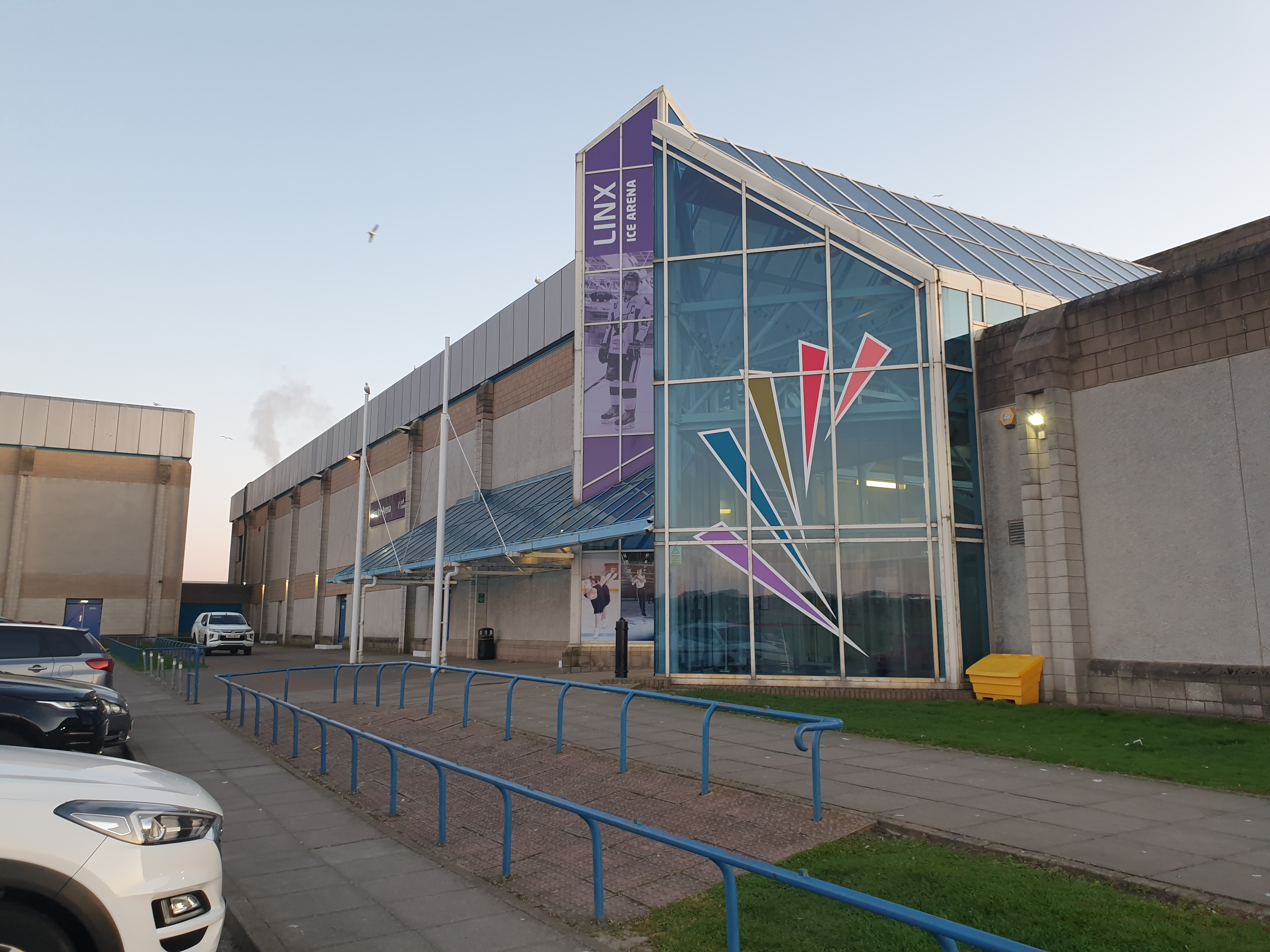
The entrance to Linx Ice Arena

Linx Ice Arena is an indoor ice rink located in Aberdeen, Scotland. It is situated adjacent to the Beach Leisure Centre. It is also home to the Aberdeen Linx Ice Skating Club

== History ==
Plans for an ice rink at the beach were approved on 4 December 1986, and again on 20 March 1989. It was constructed on an early 20th century landfill. The Linx Ice Arena opened on 1 February 1992.

The Arena underwent refurbishment in 2017.
