= Zander Wedderburn =

British psychologist (1935–2017)

Alexander Wedderburn
- Born: Alexander Allan Innes Wedderburn; 9 May 1935; Edinburgh, Scotland, UK
- Died: 23 February 2017 (aged 81); Edinburgh, Scotland, UK
- Education: University of Oxford, Heriot-Watt University
- Scientific career
- Fields: Psychology, occupational psychology
- Workplaces: Heriot-Watt University
- Thesis: Studies of attitudes to continuous shiftwork (1991)

Alexander Allan Innes "Zander" Wedderburn (9 May 1935 – 23 February 2017) was a British psychologist renown for his research on shiftwork and for the development of the teaching of occupational psychology.

== Biography ==
Wedderburn was born in Edinburgh in 1935. His father was Alexander Archibald Innes Wedderburn, a lawyer and auditor to the Court of Session. His mother was Ellen Innes Jeans. He attended Edinburgh Academy at which he obtained the position of Dux or leading student. After a period of National Service he proceeded to Exeter College, Oxford from which he graduated in 1959 with a degree in Psychology, Philosophy and Physiology. He and Jeffrey Gray, his supervisor, subsequently published the findings of his undergraduate project. After graduation, he worked in various industrial relations positions until he was appointed as a lecturer at Heriot-Watt University in Edinburgh in 1968. He rose through the ranks and retired as Professor Emeritus in 2000. After his retirement, he founded the publishing company Fledgling Press.

At Heriot-Watt, he taught occupational psychology in the School of Management. Most of his teaching was in the area of making occupational psychology available to business students and engineers, and in his final three years he established a part-time MSc in Occupational Psychology taught jointly with Strathclyde University.

His main research impact was on hours of work and shiftwork, where he became an internationally known authority, building on a British Steel Corporation Fellowship from 1970 to 1972. In 1991, Heriot-Watt University awarded him a PhD in 1991 for his research on shiftwork.

His particular interest was in the interface between research and practice, with several measured practical interventions, a ten-year stint as editor of the Bulletin of European Shiftwork Topics, and founding editor of the Shiftwork International Newsletter. He was President of the British Psychological Society in 2003/2004, only the third occupational psychologist to achieve this in the past fifty years.

He died of oesophageal cancer on 23 February 2017, aged 81.

== Honours ==
- President, British Psychological Society (2003-2004)
- Fellow, Working Time Society.

== Personal life ==
In 1960, Wedderburn married Bridget Johnstone. They had four children and eight grandchildren.

== Works ==
- Wedderburn, A. A. I. (1967) Social factors in swiftly rotating shifts. Occupational Psychology, 41, 85–107.
- Wedderburn, A. A. I. (1972) Sleep patterns on the 25-hour day in a group of tidal shiftworkers. Studia Laboris et Salutis, 11, 101–106.
- Keenan, A. and Wedderburn, A. A. I., (1975) Effects of non-verbal behaviour of interviewers on candidates' impressions. Journal of Occupational Psychology, 48, 129–132.
- Wedderburn, A. A. I. (1975) EEG and self-recorded sleep of two shiftworkers over four weeks of real and synthetic work. In Experimental Studies of Shiftwork, edited by W. P. Colquhuoun et al., Forschungsberichte des Landes Nordrhein-Westfalen 2513.
- Wedderburn, A. A. I. (1978) Some suggestions for increasing the usefulness of psychological and sociological studies of shiftwork. Ergonomics, 21, 827–833.
- Keenan, A. and Wedderburn, A. A. I. (1980), Putting the boot on the other foot: candidates' descriptions of interviewers. Journal of Occupational Psychology, 53, 81–89
- Wedderburn, A. A. I. (1987) Unintentional falling asleep at work: what can you do about it In Contemporary advances in shiftwork research, ed. Oginski et al., Krakow, Medical Academy.
- Wedderburn, A. A. I. (1987) Sleeping on the job: the use of anecdotes for recording rare but serious events. Ergonomics, 30, 1229–1233.
- Wedderburn, A. A. I. (1991) Guidelines for shiftworkers. Bulletin of European Shiftwork Topics 3. European Foundation for the Improvement of Living and Working Conditions, Dublin.
- Wedderburn, A. A. I. (1992) How fast should the night shift rotate? A rejoinder. Ergonomics, 35, 1447–1451
- Wedderburn A. A. I. and Scholarios, D. (1993) Guidelines for shiftworkers: trials and errors. Ergonomics, 36, 211–217
- Wedderburn, A. A. I. (1993) Teaching grandmothers how to suck eggs: do shiftworkers need rules or guidelines? Ergonomics, 36.
- Wedderburn, A. A. I. (1995) Men and women who like continuous shiftwork are more 'hardy': but what does it mean? Work & Stress, 9, 206–210.
- Quinn, K. M., King, C., Slawek, K. and Wedderburn, A. A. I. (1995) The effectiveness of an individually tailored health education intervention for 24hr shiftworkers. Paper presented at the XII Symposium on Night and Shiftwork, Connecticut.
- Monk, T. H., Folkarc, S. and Wedderburn A. A. I. (1996) Maintaining safety and high performance on shiftwork. in Applied Ergonomics, 27, 17–23
- Wedderburn A. A. I. Rankin D. (2001) An intervention using a self-help guide to improve the coping behaviour of nightshift workers and its evaluation. HSE Books.
