= Alexander Roche =

Alexander Roche may refer to:

- Adair Roche, Baron Roche (1871–1956), British barrister and law lord
- Alexander Ignatius Roche (1861–1921), Scottish artist
