= Edwin Alexander =

Scottish artist

Edwin John Alexander RSA RSW RWS (1870–1926) was a Scottish artist known for his pictures of animals and birds.

== Life ==
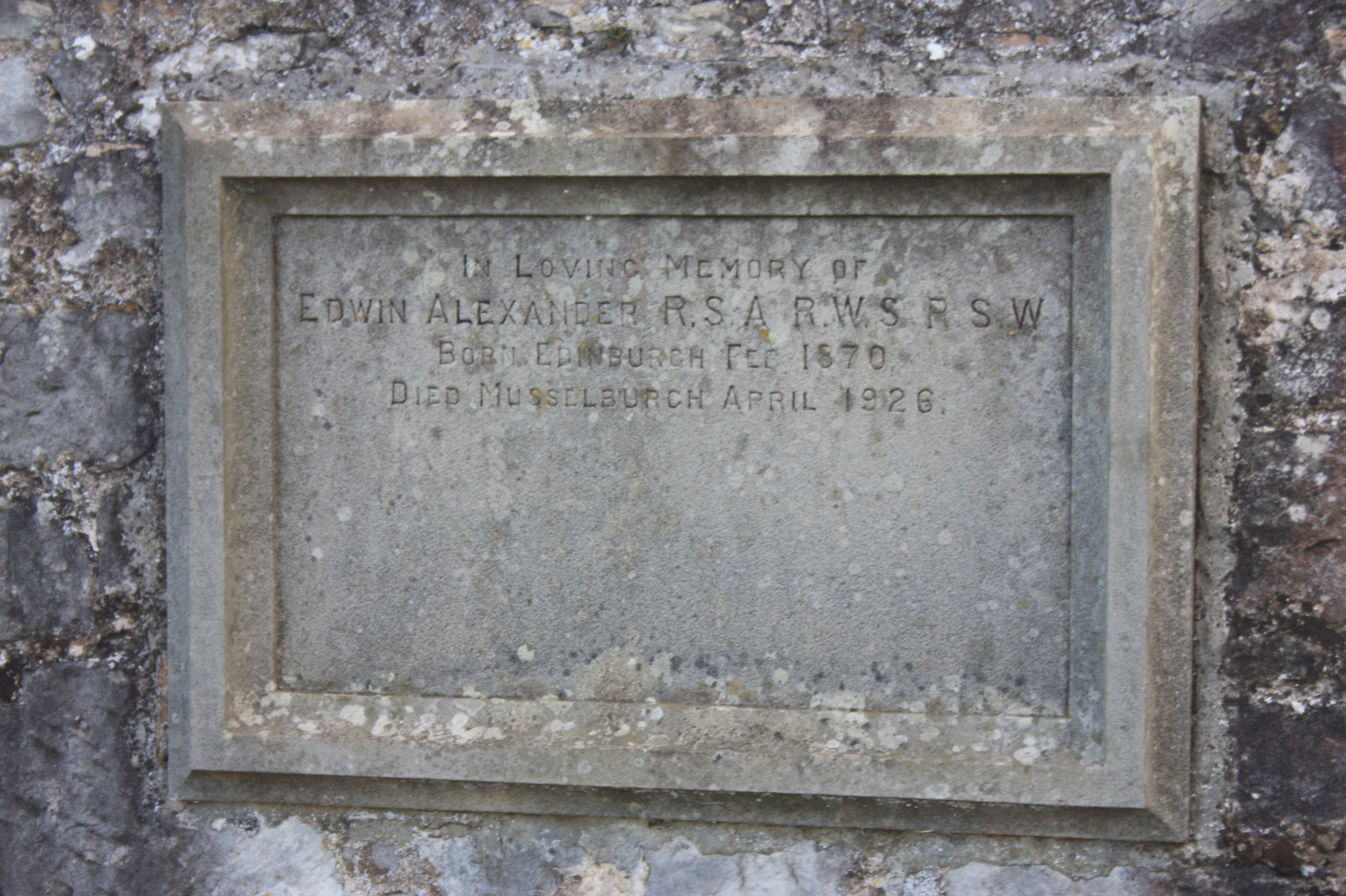
The grave of Edwin Alexander, Inveresk Cemetery

He was born in Edinburgh in February 1870 the eldest son of the artist Robert Alexander and his wife.

In 1887 and 1888 he accompanied his father on a trip to Tangiers with Joseph Crawhall III and Pollock Nisbet. On his return to Britain he studied art formally in the RSA school (the Royal Institution in Edinburgh) and then under Emmanuel Fremiet in Paris but did not receive any formal qualifications.

In 1892 he returned to North Africa and settled on the Nile, living on a houseboat on the river for 4 years. He learned Arabic and began painting desert life in Egypt.

He died in Musselburgh in April 1926. He his buried in Inveresk Cemetery in the northern section, on a wall backing onto the original churchyard to the south (east of the large red granite monument to John Brunton).

== Family ==
He married in 1904.

He was brother-in-law to the artists Alexander Ignatius Roche and to William Walls.

== Known works ==
- The Wate
- Peacock (1899)
- Blue Tit
