= Mary Alexander (disambiguation) =

Mary Alexander (1693–1760) was an American merchant.

Mary Alexander may also refer to:

- Mary Alexander Cook (1902–1981), English expert on Cape Dutch architecture, and museum curator
- Mary Alexander Park (1850–1920), Scottish-born New Zealand artist
- Mary Alexander Yard, real name of Molly Yard (1912–2005), American feminist and social activist
- Mary C. Alexander (1893–1955), American aviation pioneer
