= Dalgarven =

Village in North Ayrshire

Coordinates: 55.676°N 4.711°W

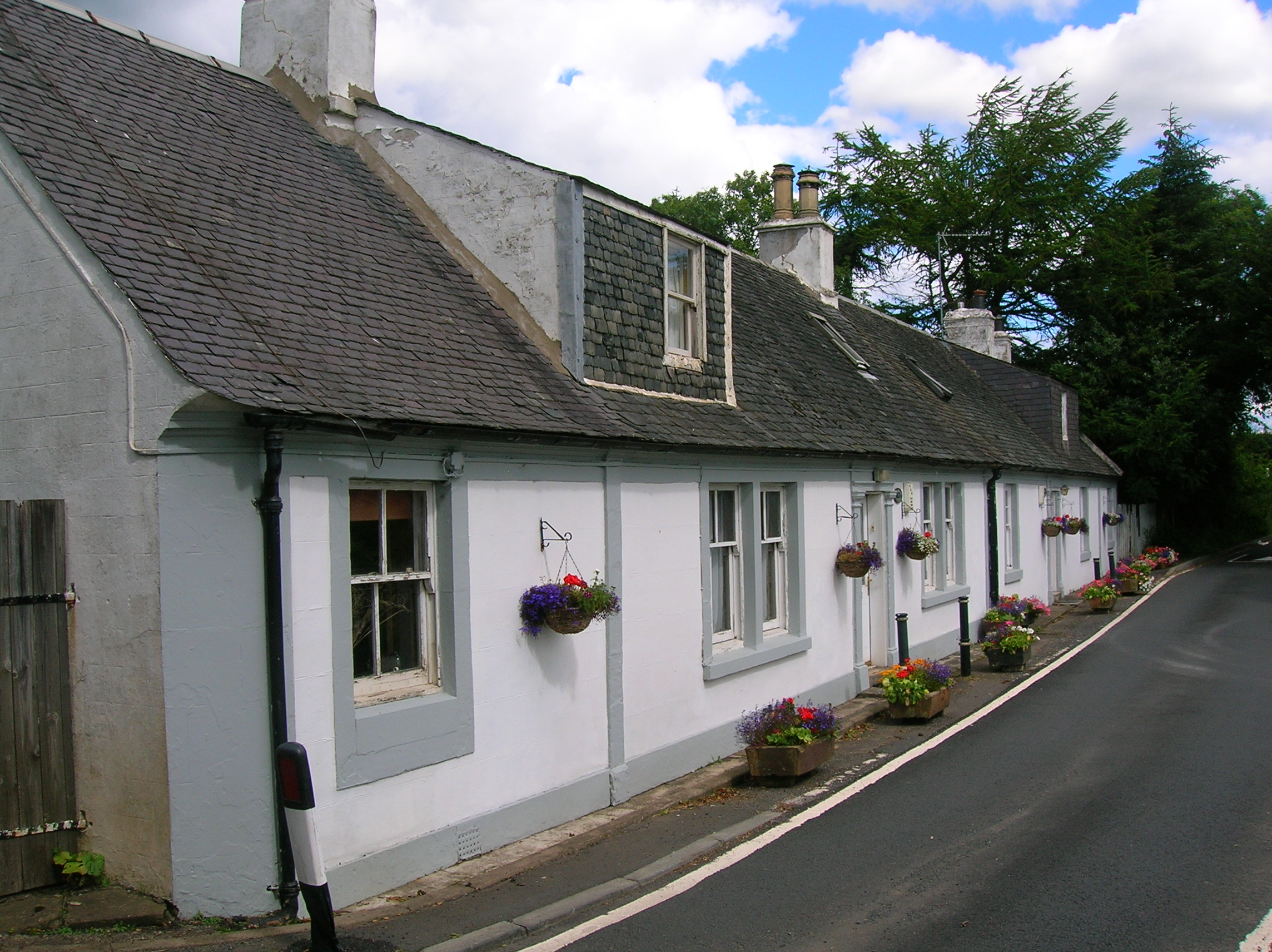
A row at the old village of Dalgarven

The tiny village of Dalgarven in North Ayrshire, Scotland is located just north of Kilwinning on the road to Dalry.

== History ==
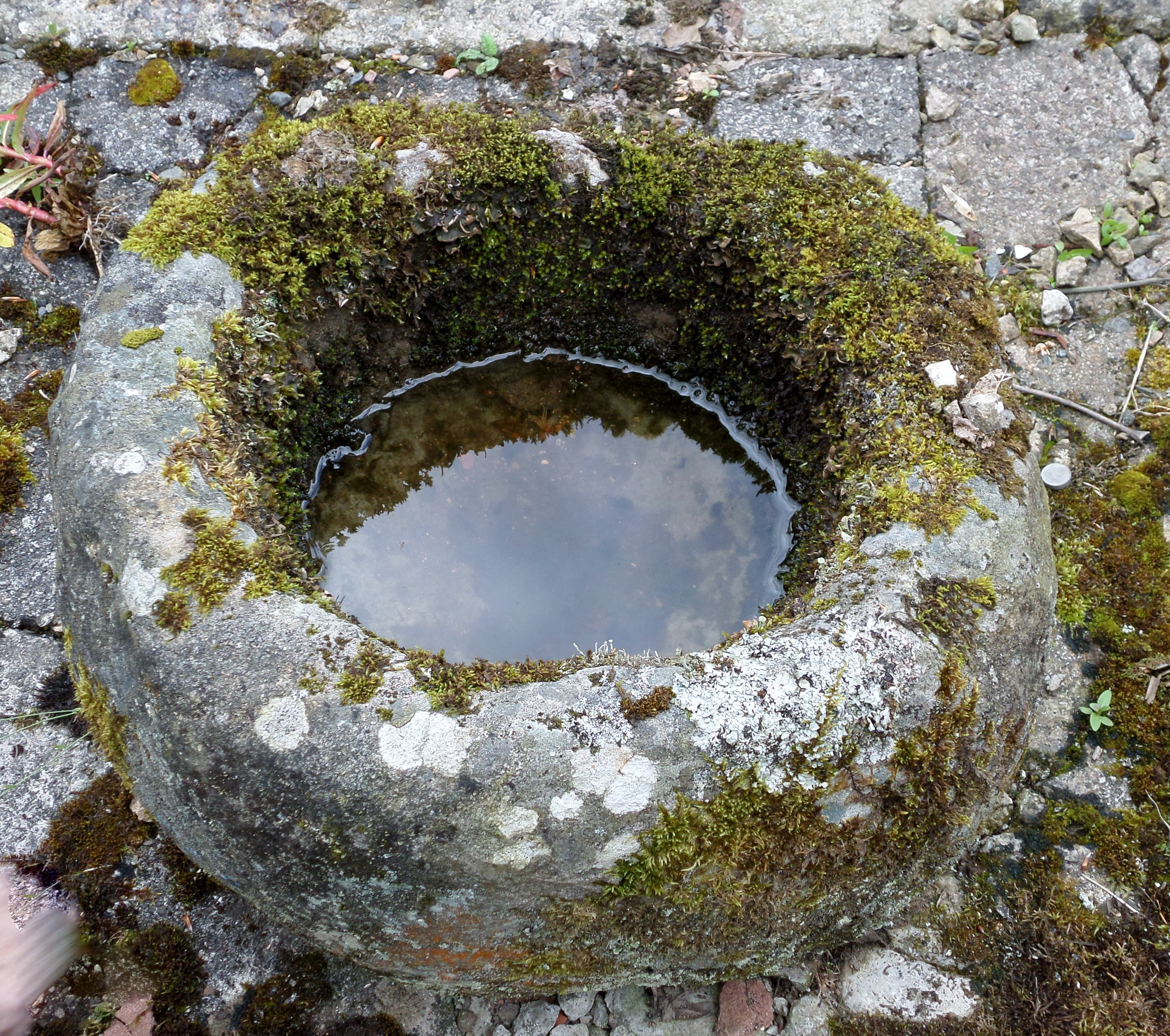
Possible pre-reformation font from Dalgarven

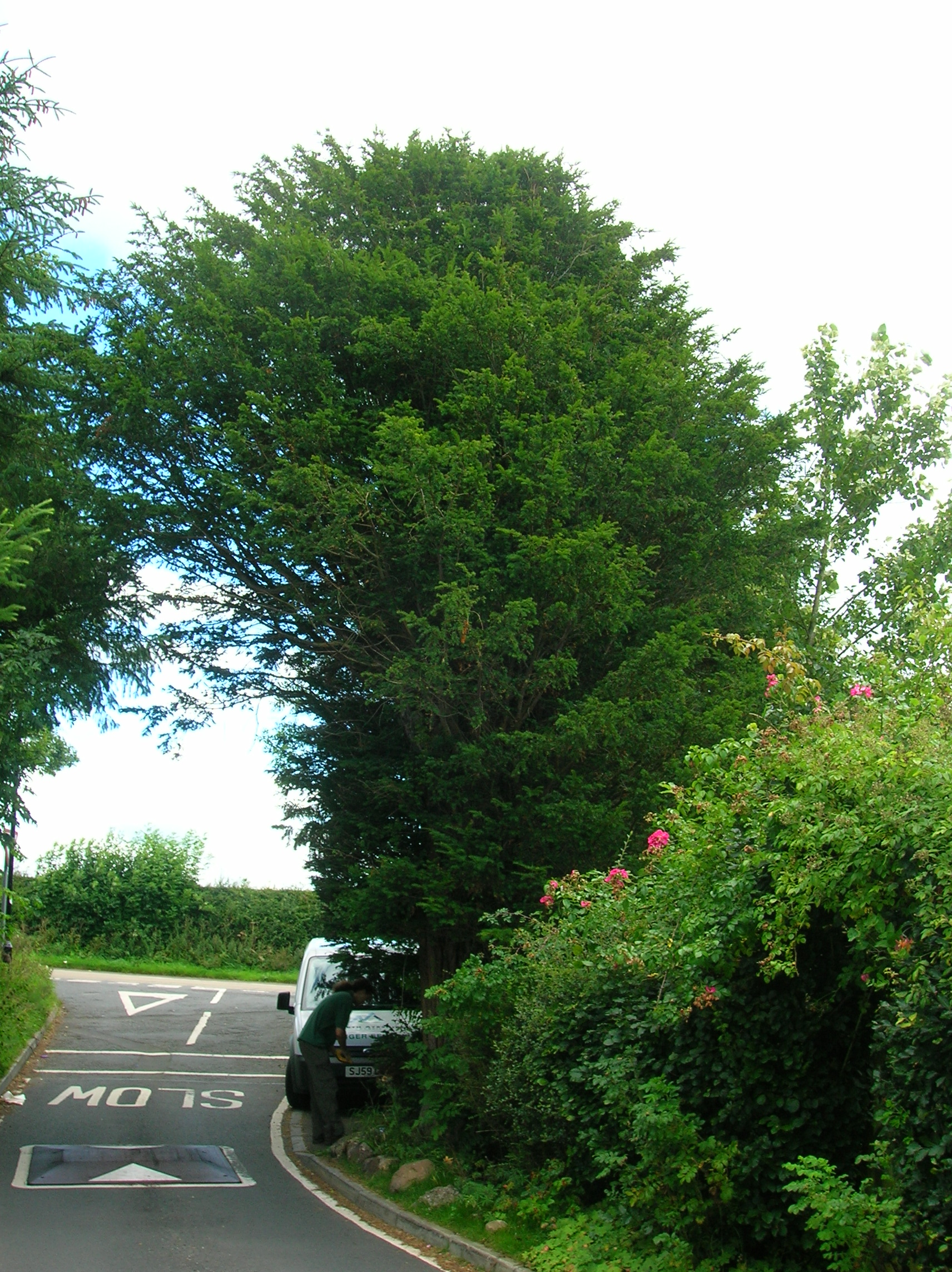
Old Yew tree at Dalgarven Village.

In 1881 some two hundred people lived in the village, the mill being at its heart, with a Sunday school, smithy, joiner's shop and Dalgarven House. Most of the women were weavers, dressmakers, farm or domestic servants. The men were stonemasons, joiners, farm labourers, platelayers, railway surfacemen, etc. Monkcastle House is at one end of the village and Smithstone House at the other. The coming of the new road resulted in the demolition of most of the village apart from the smithy and a cottage row.

A pre-reformation chapel is said to have existed in the vicinity and the old yew tree may be indicative of this.

Located here on the River Garnock is Dalgarven Mill, home to the Museum of Ayrshire Country Life and Costume.

The Dalgarven Arch was an ogee topped doorway with jambs of clustered gothic shafts. John Connel, builder of the present Kilwinning Tower, is said to have brought the stones here from Kilwinning Abbey. However, they do not appear to have been contemporary with Kilwinning Abbey. They are no longer situated at Dalgarven.

== Notable people ==
- Robert Alexander RSA (1840–1923), animal artist born and raised in Dalgarven
