= Loanhead =

Coordinates: 55.878°N 3.148°W

Loanhead: Scots: Loanheid
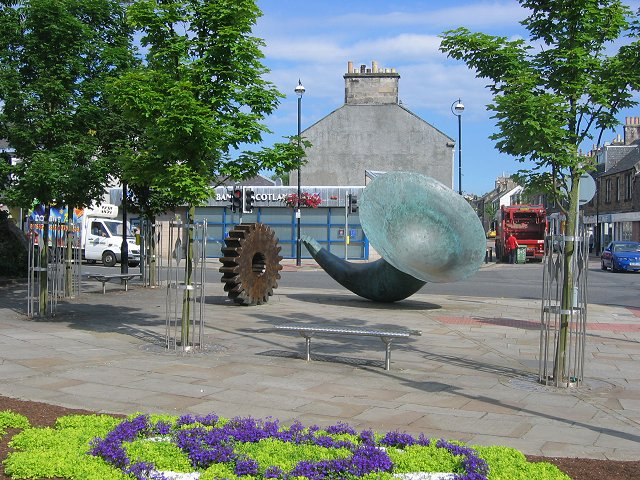
- Bronze sculpture by Andrew Burton, known as the Coghorn, and dates from 1999

- Location within Midlothian
- Population: 6,820 (2020)
- OS grid reference: NT281655
- Council area: Midlothian
- Lieutenancy area: Midlothian
- Country: Scotland
- Sovereign state: United Kingdom
- Post town: LOANHEAD
- Postcode district: EH20
- Dialling code: 0131
- Police: Scotland
- Fire: Scottish
- Ambulance: Scottish
- UK Parliament: Midlothian
- Scottish Parliament: Midlothian North and Musselburgh

Loanhead is a town in Midlothian, Scotland, in a commuter belt to the south of Edinburgh, and close to Roslin, Bonnyrigg and Dalkeith. The town was built on coal and oil shale mining, and the paper industries.

== History ==
Loanhead was a tiny village by about 1599, when it was included on a map of the Lothians. It was granted a charter allowing a weekly market and annual fair in 1669. Coal was mined profitably in the area for Sir John Clerk of Penicuik by 1685. The Springfield paper mill, in the valley of the River North Esk to the south of the town, commenced in 1742, while Polton mill followed in 1750. By 1754 Loanhead was a medium-sized settlement.

The limestone industry was a source of employment by the late eighteenth century, the works being at Burdiehouse, about a mile to the northwest. The coal industry continued to expand and by 1874 the town was linked to the railway. Shale was mined between Loanhead and Burdiehouse in the late nineteenth century, from 1880 under the Clippens Oil Company of Paisley. By this time the population had expanded to 3,250. The town was granted burgh status in 1884. The North British Railway built a steel lattice girder box viaduct across Bilston Glen in 1892, replacing another which had been designed by Thomas Bouch.

The shale mines closed in 1909 because of incoming water from the Edinburgh waterworks aqueducts. Burdiehouse limeworks ceased in 1912, although limestone was mined in the area until 1960. The Polton paper mill closed in 1955.

Coal mining continued, with the large Bilston Glen pit being sunk between 1952 and 1961. It was closed in 1989, and the site cleared. Bilston Glen Colliery at one stage produced 1,000,000 tons of coal per annum, and employed 2,300 men. The coal workings stretched from Rosewell to Dalkeith. All coal working ceased following the violent strikes of 1984–1985, when Margaret Thatcher was Prime Minister. The site is now used as an industrial estate.

== Governance ==
Loanhead is administered by Midlothian Council, and following recent boundary changes lies in the new ward of Midlothian West, served by three Midlothian Councillors. At a local level, the Community Council provides a forum at which local views can be aired.

== Economy and commerce ==
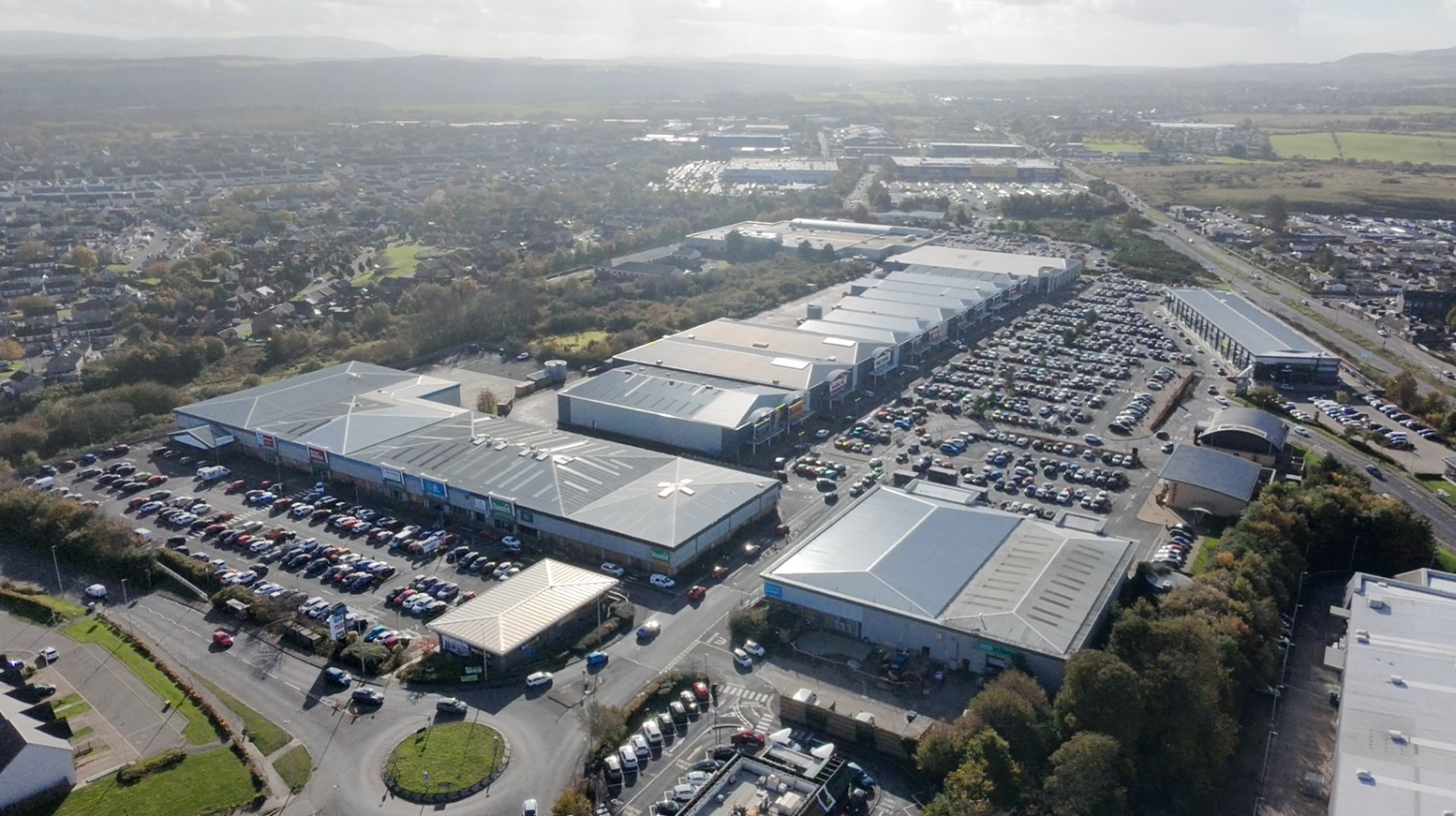
Drone imagery of Straiton Mains retail park, alongside Straiton Road.

Straiton Retail Park includes one of only two IKEA stores in Scotland. Proposals have been made for Straiton to be further developed with new facilities including an 8,000 capacity events arena serving Edinburgh. Two hotels are included in the proposals.

The main street, Clerk Street, is busy with traffic and local shoppers. Large supermarkets are in proximity.

A large, modern industrial estate with around 100 different concerns provides a wide range of jobs for local residents. Businesses include: MacSweens haggis factory, and Police Scotland's Communications Centre (The Force Communications Centre, or FCC) where all radio traffic and emergency calls are handled. The Pentlands industrial estate was opened in the 1970s, and a number of retail and other businesses trade from the periphery of the town. These were from the likes of food shops to more industrial companies focusing on welding and steel fabrication.

== Culture, recreation and leisure ==
Loanhead Children’s Gala Day

Loanhead Children’s Gala Day is one of the oldest and largest of Scotland's traditional children's galas, and one of very few which have crowned over 100 Queens. This takes place on the 4th Saturday in June each year and is a week long celebration of different events, including a fun run, dog show, jumble football, outdoor concerts on the Sunday afternoon and Wednesday night, the main day itself on the Saturday has a crowning ceremony, parades and park entertainment. This increasingly popular event attracts a large amount of spectators. The children of the court are assigned roles by their schools, the most notable roles include the Queen and the Herald, these particular roles are rotated each year between the respective schools; Loanhead and Paradykes. (Before its closing, St Margaret's was also included in the rotation.) The Queen and Herald attend local events and perform some public duties during their twelve months of service. The Queen and Herald have parts in the Crowning Ceremony of the following year when they become the Retiring Queen and Retiring Herald. A book to commemorate the children's festival 100th Anniversary was published in 2003.

As an offshoot from the Loanhead Music Festival, Loanhead Guitar Club meets on Wednesday evenings to provide informal tuition and practice opportunities in guitar and other instruments for over 18's. The Loanhead Miners Club continues to be a major social and community hub for the town, and wide variety of events are run from there. Loanhead Guitar Club meets on Wednesday evenings to provide informal tuition and practice opportunities for over 18's.

Several community groups run a variety of clubs including five a side football and Girl Guides.

A small green square in the centre of the town features a memorial to miners killed in the town's coal mines, and large and popular bronze sculpture known as the Coghorn, by Andrew Burton. A small cat originally featured on the tip of the horn, but this was removed by vandals, and is yet to be replaced. A local Palladian mansion, Mavisbank House, built in 1723 but derelict for many years, featured on the BBC television series Restoration in 2004.

== Education and healthcare ==
The town has two primary schools – Paradykes, and Loanhead Primary. Before being closed, St. Margaret’s was also a (catholic) primary school in Loanhead.

A new joint campus for St. Margaret's and Loanhead Primary was completed and opened in March 2008. The two schools were on the same site but separate allowing the separation of Roman Catholic and secular education but children were able to mix in a range of activities.

Paradykes incorporates a Family Learning Centre and is part of the Loanhead Centre, providing school/wrap around care, a library, medical centre, early years' provision and leisure facilities. Opened in October 2018 by Deputy First Minister of Scotland and the Cabinet Secretary for Education and Skills, John Swinney .

== Transport ==
A park and ride facility off of the A720 city by-pass opened in 2009. It is directly served by Lothian Buses route 47 into Edinburgh City Centre. Lothian Buses also operates route 37 regularly into Loanhead from Edinburgh.

== Twin towns ==
The town is twinned with Harnes in northern France, which also has a strong mining tradition. The town was formerly twinned with Dalum in Denmark, just south of Odense, on the island of Funen. In the 1960s, several exchange visits between the two towns took place, but the twinning formally ceased as a consequence of Dalum being absorbed by the much larger Odense.

== Notable people ==
- Mary Alexander Park (1850–1920), artist
- George Forrest (1873–1932), a plant collector who gained fame with his expeditions to the far east, he spent a significant part of his early years in the town in a house in Linden Place, which has a plaque marking the fact.
- Sir William MacTaggart (1903–1981), artist, and grandson of the artist William McTaggart, he became president of the Society of Scottish Artists, president of the Royal Scottish Academy, and trustee of the National Museum of Antiquities.
- Charles Forte, Baron Forte (1908–2007), the hotelier, worked in an Italian cafe in the High Street, on his arrival in Scotland from Italy.
- Alex Young (1937–2017), Scottish international footballer
- Ishbel MacAskill (1941–2011), Scottish Gaelic singer, born here
- Gary Naysmith (born 1978), Scottish International footballer and manager who played for Heart of Midlothian, Everton, Sheffield United, Huddersfield Town and Aberdeen. He was named Scottish PFA Young Player of the Year in 1998.
- John Charles Boileau Grant (1886–1973), anatomist who trained at the University of Edinburgh, emigrated to Canada in 1919 and worked at the University of Manitoba (1919–1930) and the University of Toronto (1930–1956). He is the author of Grant's Atlas of Anatomy, first published in 1943 and currently in its 14th edition.
- Karl Miller (1931–2014), British literary editor, critic and writer. He was a founding editor of the London Review of Books from 1979 until 1992. Before this, he was editor of The Listener from 1963 until 1973. Educated at the Royal High School, Edinburgh.
