= Robert Alexander (artist) =

Scottish artist

Alexander in 1904.

Robert Alexander RSA RSW (1840–1923) was a 19th and early 20th century Scottish artist. He had a special interest in dog and horse portraits.

== Life ==
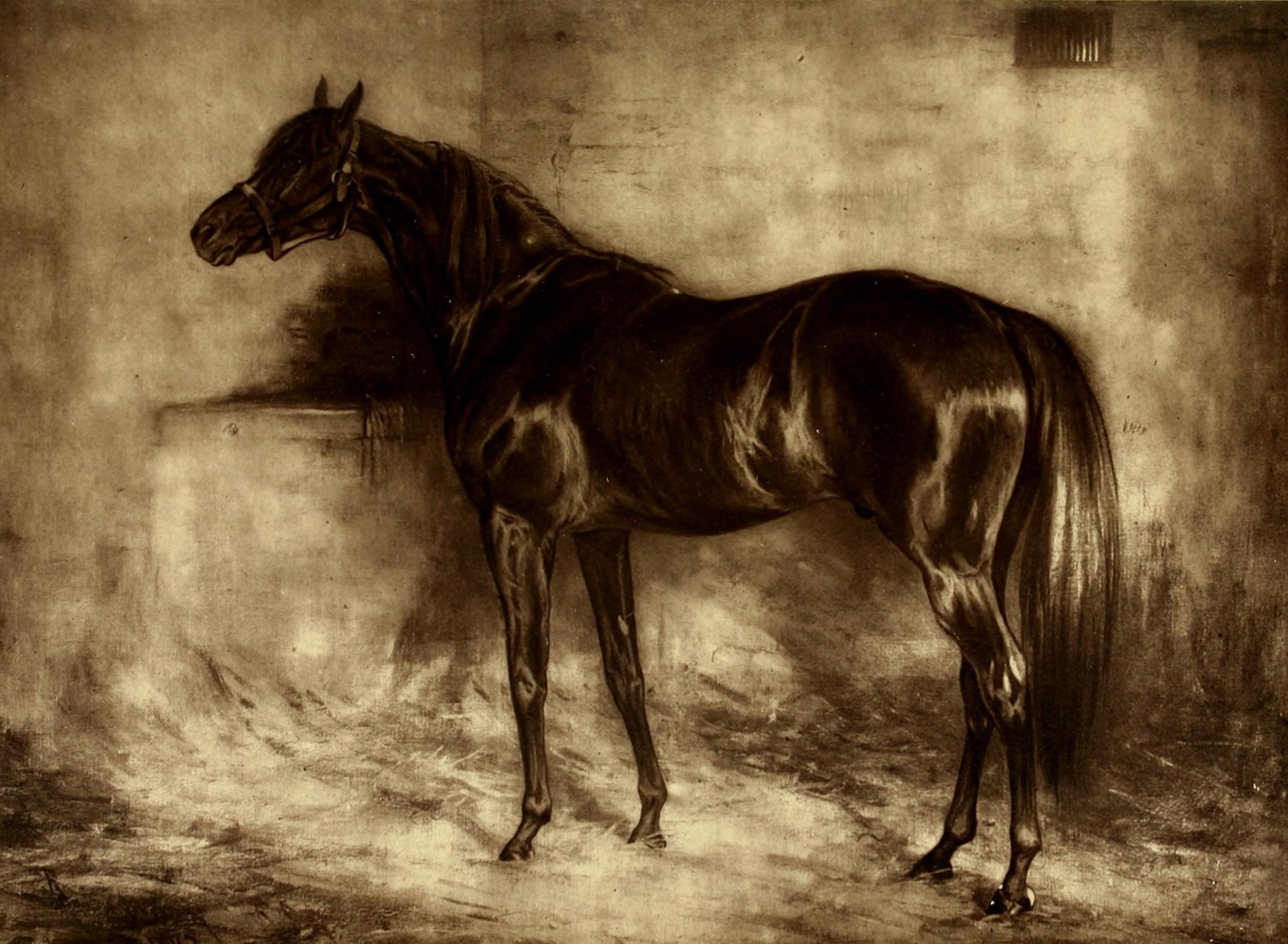
Portrait of St. Simon

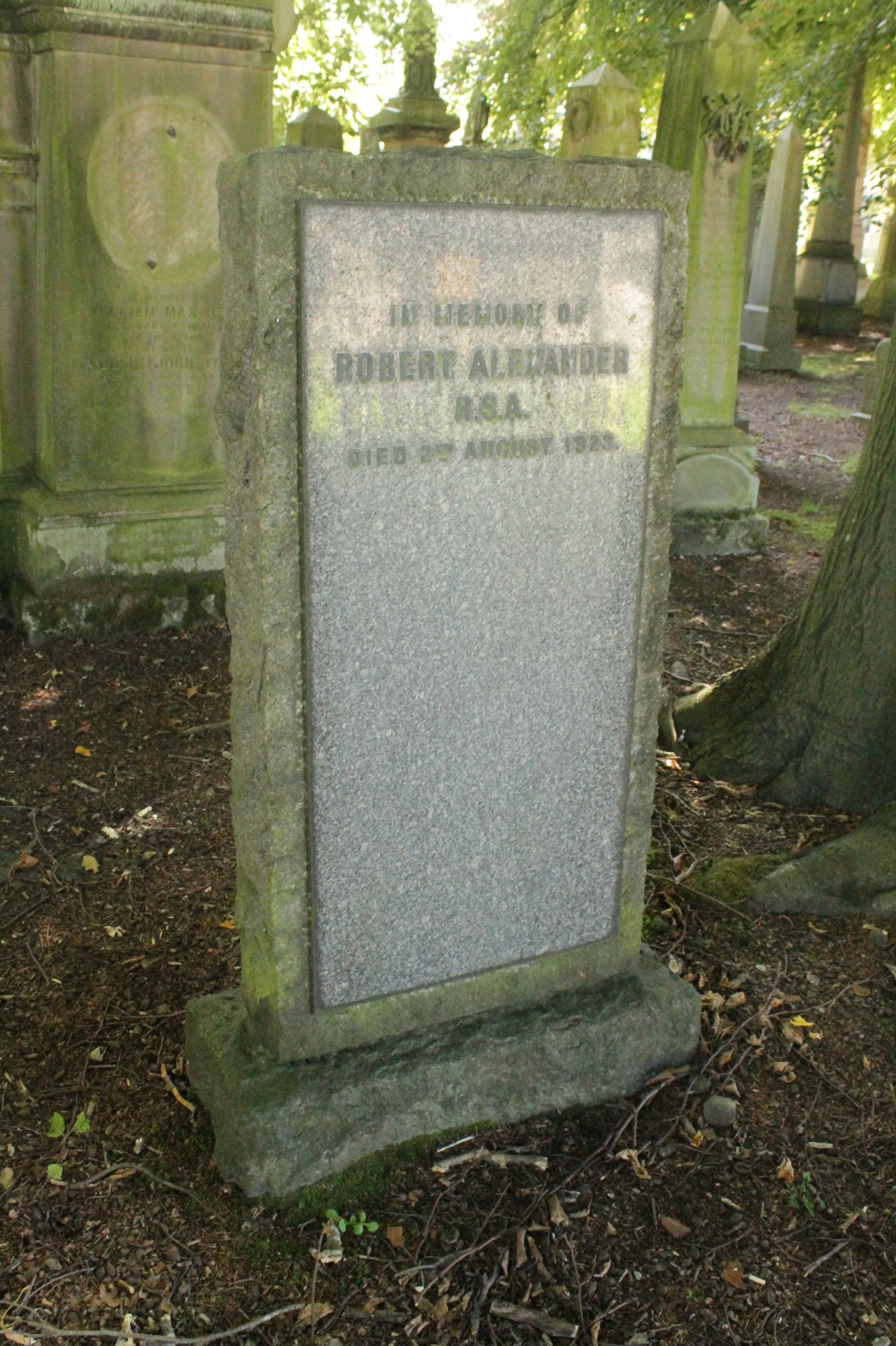
The grave of Robert Alexander RSA, Dean Cemetery

Robert was born in Dalgarven near Kilwinning in Ayrshire. He was apprenticed to a painter and decorator in Irvine around 1854, who also taught him how to paint landscapes.

Around 1860 he obtained a position in the workshops of the Royal Scottish Museum in Edinburgh. From 1868 he fully adopted oil painting as his profession, largely painting rural scenes and animals. He was elected ARSA in 1878 and RSA in 1888.

In 1887–88 he visited Tangiers with Joseph Crawhall III, Pollock Nisbet and his son Edwin.

He was an influence on the artist George Denholm Armour and accompanied him on a second trip to Tangiers. He visited Paris in 1906 and was greatly influenced thereafter by the Impressionists. His main patron was the Duke of Portland.

He died in Edinburgh on 2 August 1923 and is buried in Dean Cemetery. His grave faces northwards to an east–west path in the inner north-west section, but is concealed behind larger graves.

== Family ==
He was married twice, his second wife being Jemima Jane Martin. He had three children by his first wife and four by his second.

His sons included the artist Edwin Alexander RSA RSW (1870-1926) and sculptor Martin Alexander. His son Robert Love Alexander was father to Rear Admiral Robert Love Alexander.

His daughter Jean Alexander married the artist Alexander Ignatius Roche.

== Known works ==
- Portrait of a Malamute (1876)
- The Happy Mother (1878) - a collie and pups
- Springer Spaniel (1881)
- Scottish Donkey in a Stable (1890)
- A Bay Horse and a Terrier in a Stable
- Skye Terrier
- The Dead Stag
- Study of a Horse
