= Karl Miller =

Scottish literary editor, critic and writer (1931–2014)

Karl Miller FRSL
- Born: Karl Fergus Connor Miller; 2 August 1931; Loanhead, Midlothian, Scotland
- Died: 24 September 2014 (aged 83)
- Education: Downing College, Cambridge
- Occupations: Literary editor, critic and writer

Karl Fergus Connor Miller FRSL (2 August 1931 – 24 September 2014) was a Scottish literary editor, critic and writer.

== Biography ==
Miller was born in the village of Loanhead, Midlothian, and was educated at the Royal High School of Edinburgh and Downing College, Cambridge, where he studied English; he was a Cambridge Apostle. He became literary editor of The Spectator and the New Statesman. Miller resigned from the latter over a disagreement with the magazine's editor Paul Johnson over the extent to which the literary pages treated difficult subjects, and also Johnson's disapproval of The Beatles and their fans.

He was then editor of The Listener (1967–73) and subsequently of the London Review of Books, which he founded, from 1979 to 1992. He was also Lord Northcliffe Professor of Modern English Literature and head of the English Department at University College London from 1974 to 1992.

Miller died on 24 September 2014, at the age of 83.

== Works ==
- Poetry from Cambridge 1952–4. Oxford, 1955 (editor)
- Writing in England Today: the last fifteen years. London: Penguin, 1968 (editor)
- Memoirs of a Modern Scotland. London: Faber, 1970 (editor)
- Cockburn's Millennium. London: Duckworth, 1975 (a biography of Henry Cockburn, which won Miller the James Tait Black Memorial Prize)
- Doubles: Studies in Literary History. Oxford: Oxford University Press, 1985 (criticism)
- Authors. Oxford: Clarendon, 1989
- Rebecca's Vest: a memoir. London: Hamish Hamilton, 1993
- Boswell and Hyde. London: Syrens, 1995
- Dark Horses: an experience of literary journalism. London: Picador, 1998 (memoir)
- Seamus Heaney in conversation with Karl Miller. London: BTL, 2000
- Electric Shepherd: a likeness of James Hogg. London: Faber, 2003 (biography)
- Tretower to Clyro: essays. London: Quercus, 2011

== Reviews ==
- Murray, Tom, Review of Electric Shepherd: A Likeness of James Hogg, in Colton, Julian & Murray, Tom (eds), The Eildon Tree, Issue 10: Winter 2004, Scottish Borders Council, Selkirk, pp. 4 & 5.
