= John C. Boileau Grant =

British-Canadian anatomist

John Charles Boileau Grant
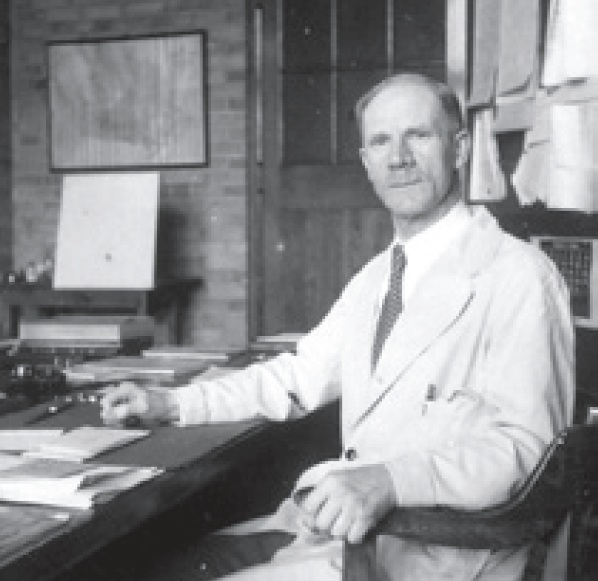
- Grant in his office, University of Toronto, 1946
- Born: 6 February 1886; Lasswade, Edinburgh, Scotland
- Died: 14 August 1973 (aged 87); Toronto, Canada
- Occupations: Doctor, Anatomy Professor In 1943, he completed Grant's Atlas of Anatomy which is now in its 16th edition.
- Spouse: Catriona Christie

John Charles Boileau Grant (1886–1973) was a British-Canadian anatomist, who was the Chair of Anatomy at the University of Toronto Faculty of Medicine from 1930 to 1956. Grant is best known for his textbook Grant's Atlas of Anatomy and Grant's Dissector which is now in its 17th edition and used by medical students all over the world.

== Education ==
Born in Loanhead (south of Edinburgh) in 1886, Grant studied medicine at the University of Edinburgh Medical School and graduated with an M.B., Ch.B. degree in 1908. While at Edinburgh, he worked under the renowned anatomist Daniel John Cunningham. and was awarded the junior and senior medals in Practical Anatomy and the Mackenzie Bursary for dissecting. From 1909 to 1911 he worked as an anatomy demonstrator under Prof. Howden at the University of Durham. He was elected a fellow of the Royal College of Surgeons of Edinburgh in 1913.

== Military service ==
Grant enlisted in the army as a medical officer during the First World War. He served with gallantry and was awarded the Military Cross while serving with the Grenadier Guards in 1916 and the Military Cross with Bar while serving with the Black Watch in 1918.

== Work ==
In 1919, he worked briefly in anatomy at Newcastle University before moving to Canada after being appointed to the Chair of Anatomy at the University of Manitoba at the age of 33. In 1930, he was appointed to the Chair of Anatomy at the University of Toronto which he served for 26 years until his retirement in 1956. It was at Toronto where his famed books of anatomy were written. He published the Method of Anatomy, Descriptive and Deductive in 1937. He published the Handbook of Dissectors in 1940 with Cates, now known as Grant's Dissector and in its 16th edition. In 1943, he completed Grant's Atlas of Anatomy which is now in its 13th edition. Grant was a very popular teacher, year on year his students voted his class in anatomy as the most popular in the faculty. After retirement he continued on as the Curator of the Anatomy Museum at the University of Toronto.

In 1961, he was appointed part-time to teach anatomy as a visiting professor of Anatomy to UCLA which he continued until 1970. At UCLA, he was so beloved by his students that they devoted an annual Freshman Christmas Party to him.

== Honours ==
The anatomy museum at the University of Toronto is named after him.

== Death ==
Grant died on August 14, 1973, at the age of 87.
