= Mary Alexander Park =

18th/19th century New Zealand/Scottish painter

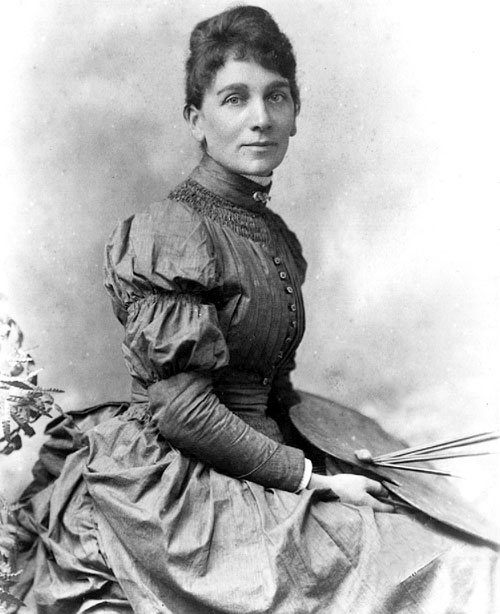
- Born: 1 April 1850; Loanhead, Scotland
- Died: 23 October 1920 (aged 70); Dunedin, New Zealand
- Education: L'Académie Julian, Paris
- Known for: Painting

Mary Alexander Park (1 April 1850 – 23 October 1920) was an artist who lived in Scotland and New Zealand. She exhibited at the Royal Glasgow Institute of the Fine Arts and the Otago Art Society. Her students included Ignatius Roche and John Lavery.

== Early life ==
Park was born in Loanhead, Scotland on 1 April 1850. Her parents, John Brown Park (1821-1891) and Christina Alexander (1821-1906), had an older sister Jesse before Mary and later had a third daughter Agnes.

The family moved from Scotland to Tasmania when Mary was five years old. Park studied at her parents' schools in both Tasmania and Dunedin where she developed art skills at a young age.

== Career ==
Park's first exhibit was at the Otago Art Society in 1876 and she became well known as a portrait painter.

Park moved back to Scotland in 1880 and was based in Europe for 20 years, spending time at Rodolphe Julian's private art school L'Académie Julian in Paris, before returning to Dunedin. While in Scotland, she painted and also taught art in Helensburgh with Madge Ross, who she had met in Paris while training. Their students included the Glasgow Boys' Alexander Ignatius Roche and John Lavery.

Park and Ross exhibited at their home, at the 7 East Princes Street gallery of Macneur and Bryden Stationers, at the Lady Artists' Club, and at the Royal Glasgow Institute of the Fine Arts.

Ross and Park moved to Glasgow in 1906 and Park returned to New Zealand in 1911.

== Death ==
Park died of a heart attack in Dunedin on 23 October 1920.
