= Joseph Crawhall III =

English painter (1861–1913)

Joseph Crawhall
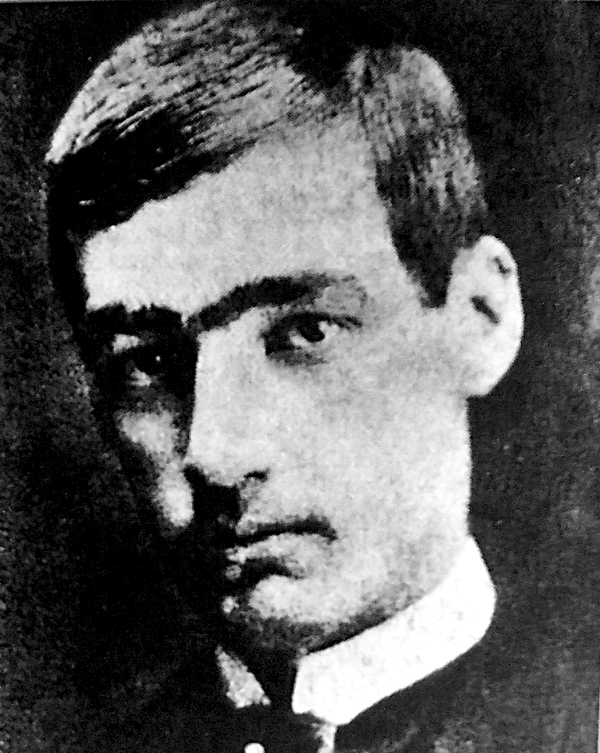
- Born: 20 August 1861; Morpeth, Northumberland, England
- Died: 24 May 1913 (aged 51); London, England
- Occupation: Artist
- Parent: Joseph Crawhall II (father)

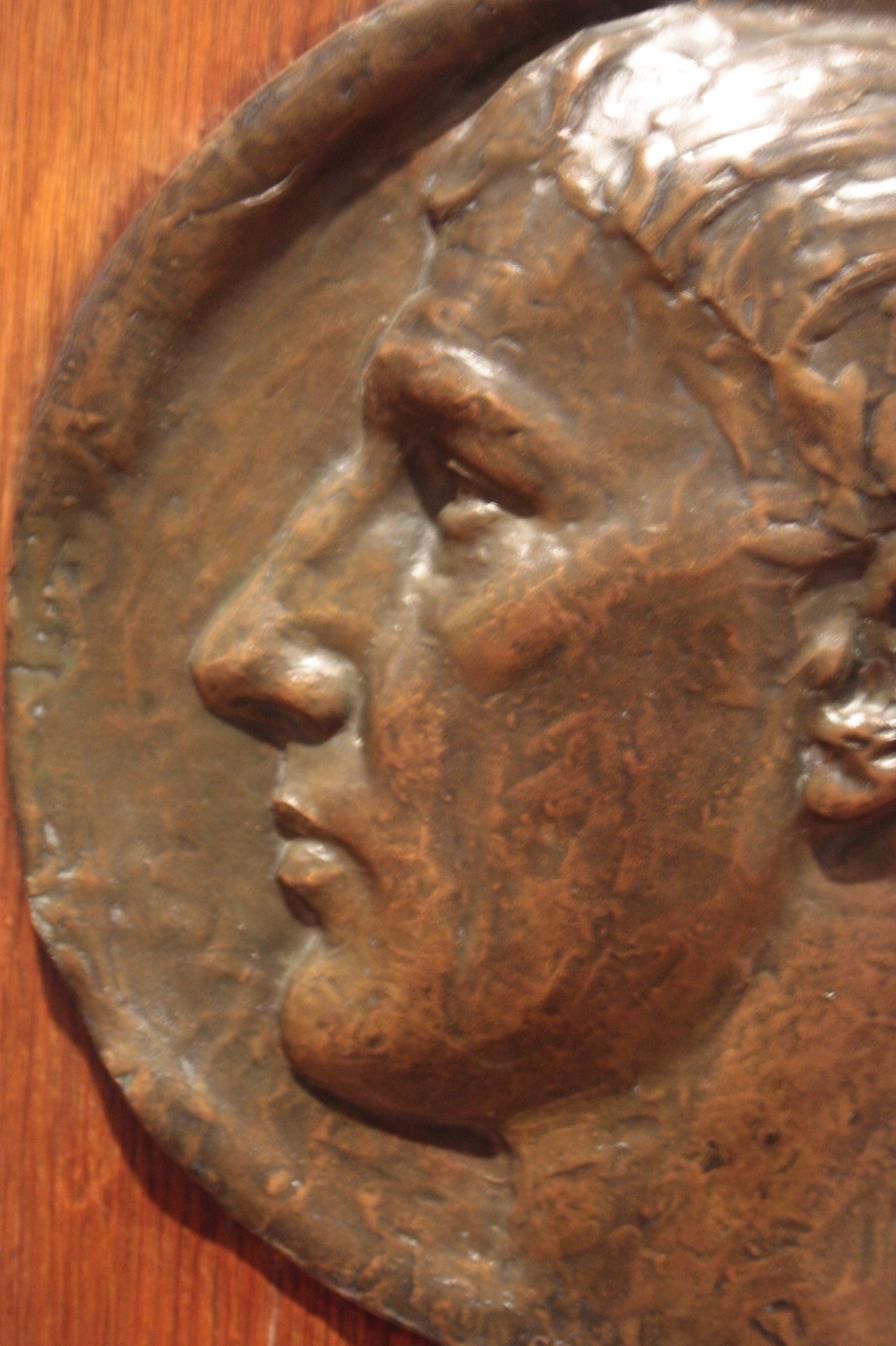
Joseph Crawhall sculpted by James Pittendrigh Macgillivray 1881 (detail)

Joseph Crawhall (20 August 1861 – 24 May 1913) was an English artist born in Morpeth, Northumberland.

== Life ==
Crawhall was the fourth child and second son of Joseph Crawhall II and Margaret Boyd. Crawhall specialised in painting animals and birds. He was born 20 August 1861 at Morpeth, Northumberland. He trained at King's College London before going to Paris to work with Aimé Morot in 1882.

In the 1880s and 1890s, his work became associated with the Glasgow Boys. He was strongly influenced by the Impressionists, and his work, like theirs, was rejected by the art establishment, in his case in the form of the Royal Scottish Academy.

In 1887/88 he visited Tangiers with Pollock Nisbet, Robert Alexander and Robert's son Edwin.

In the 1880s he travelled throughout Morocco and Spain, abandoning oil painting and moving to watercolours with a lighter palette.

In April 1894 art dealer Alexander Reid gave Crawhall his first one-man-show, at the inaugural exhibition at Reid's new gallery at 124 St Vincent Street in central Glasgow. The principal buyer of Crawhall's work from this exhibition was William Burrell. Reid had introduced Crawhall and Burrell at a private dinner party at his house on 13 April.

He died in London in May 1913.

== Legacy ==
Many of Crawhall's works are in the Kelvingrove Art Gallery and Museum and in the Burrell Collection. His works are few because he is known to have destroyed those he was unhappy with.

A portrait of him by Walter Westley Russell is in the City Art Centre, Edinburgh.

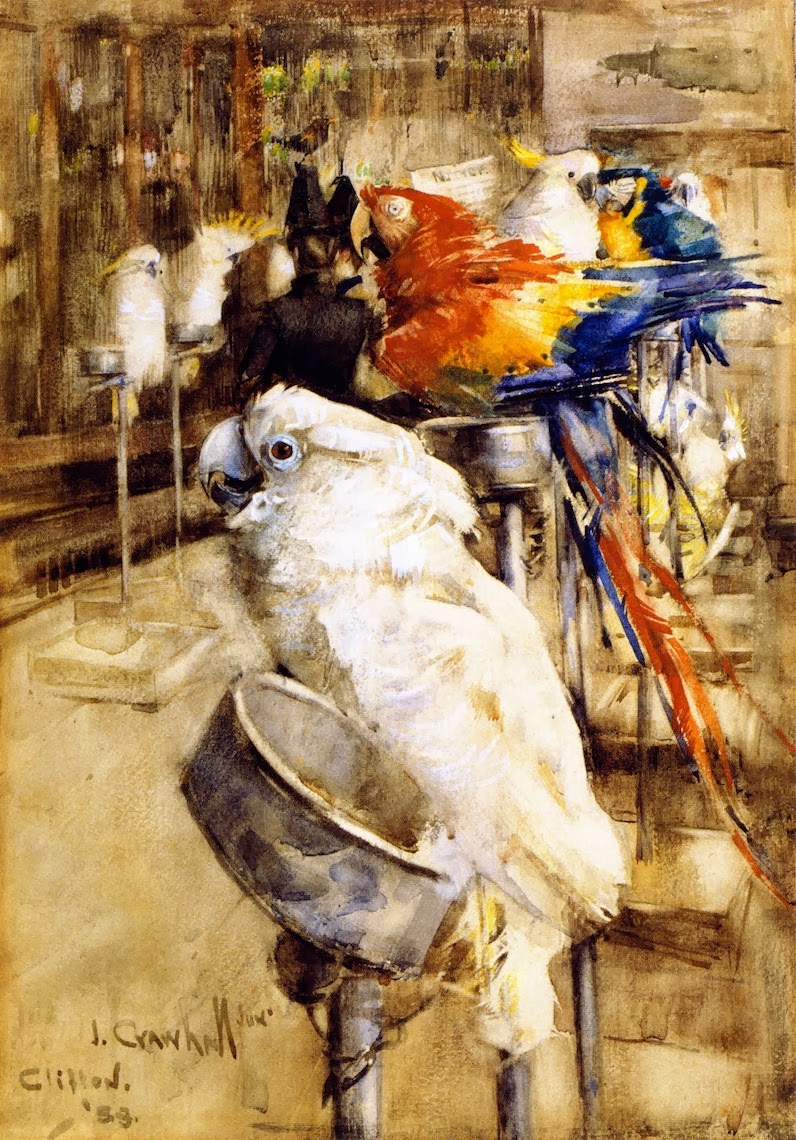
The Aviary, Clifton, 1888

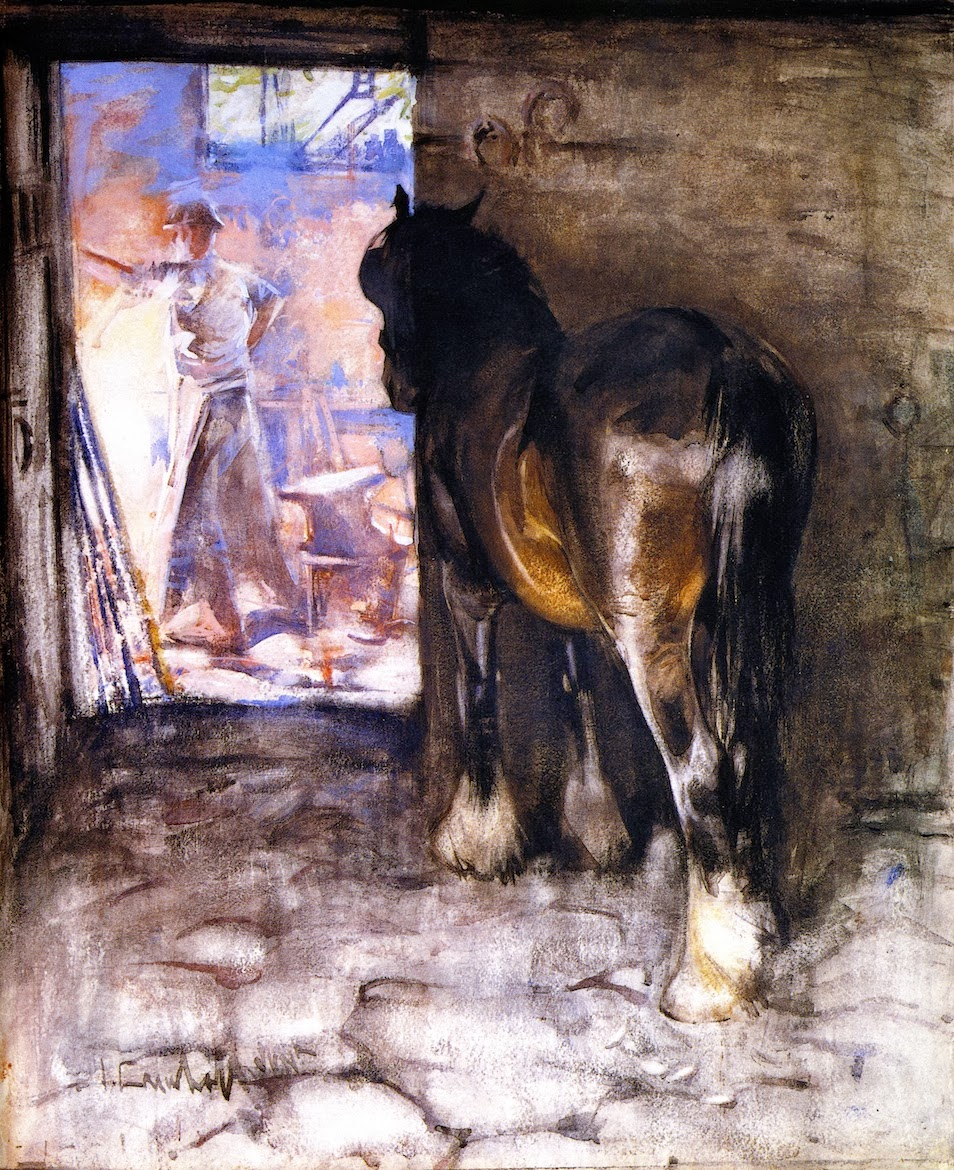
The Forge, by 1885

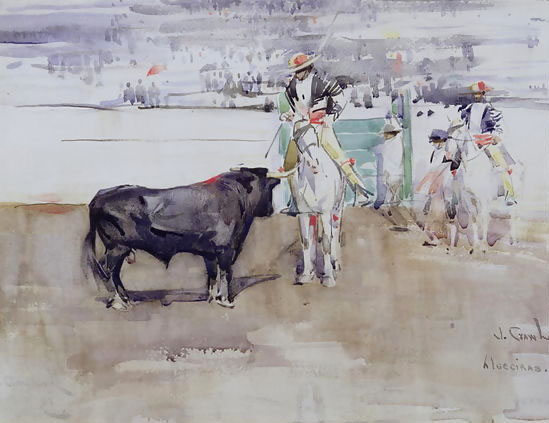
Bullring in Algeciras, 1891

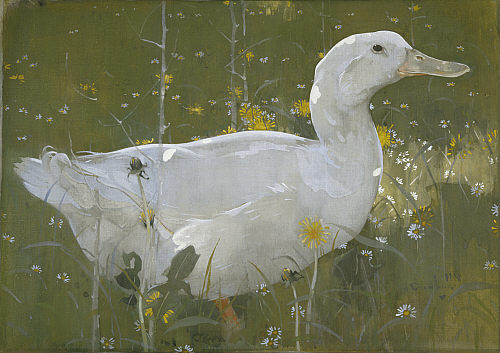
The White Drake, 1895, National Gallery of Scotland

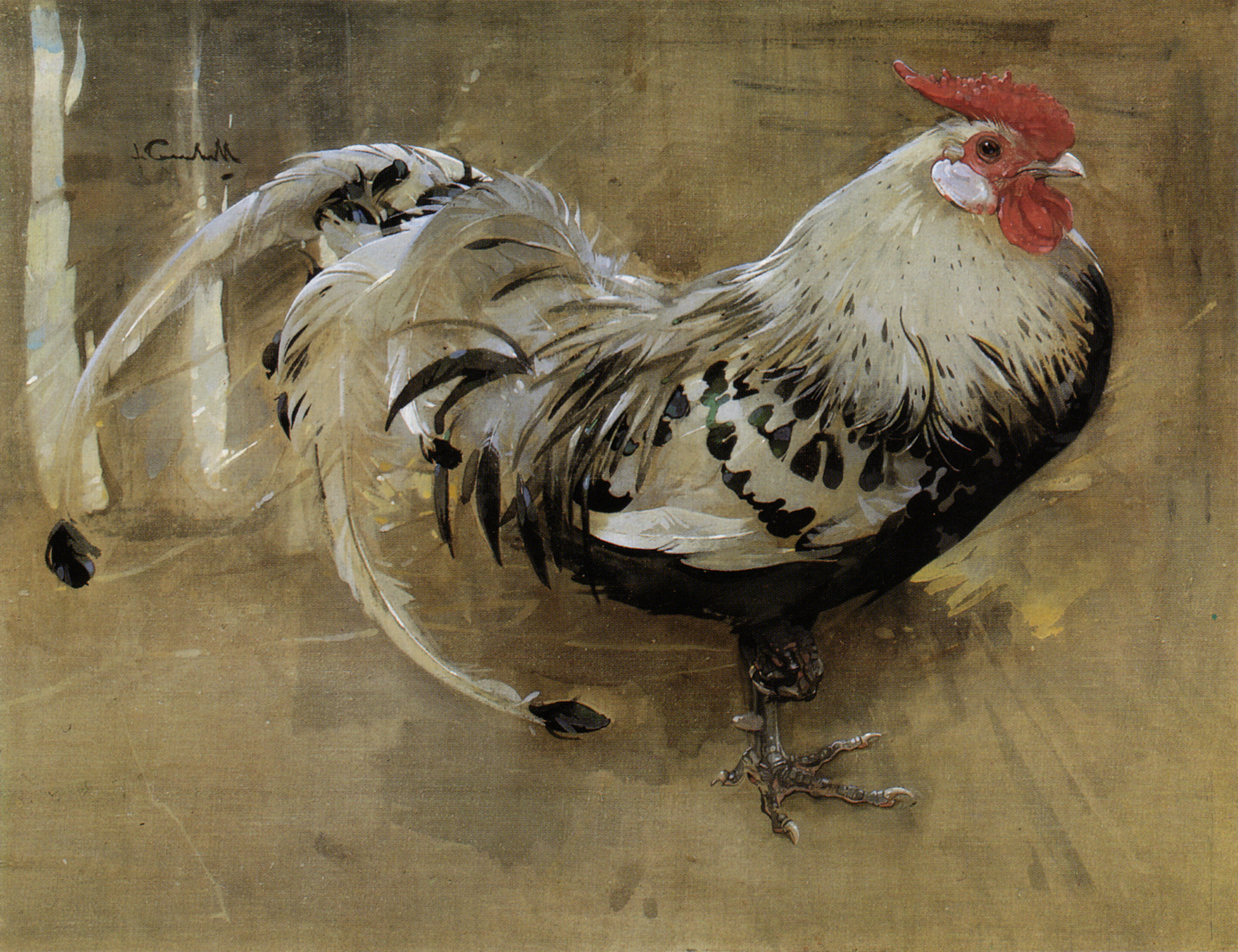
Spangled Cock, 1903
