= Alexander Ignatius Roche =

Scottish painter (1861–1921)

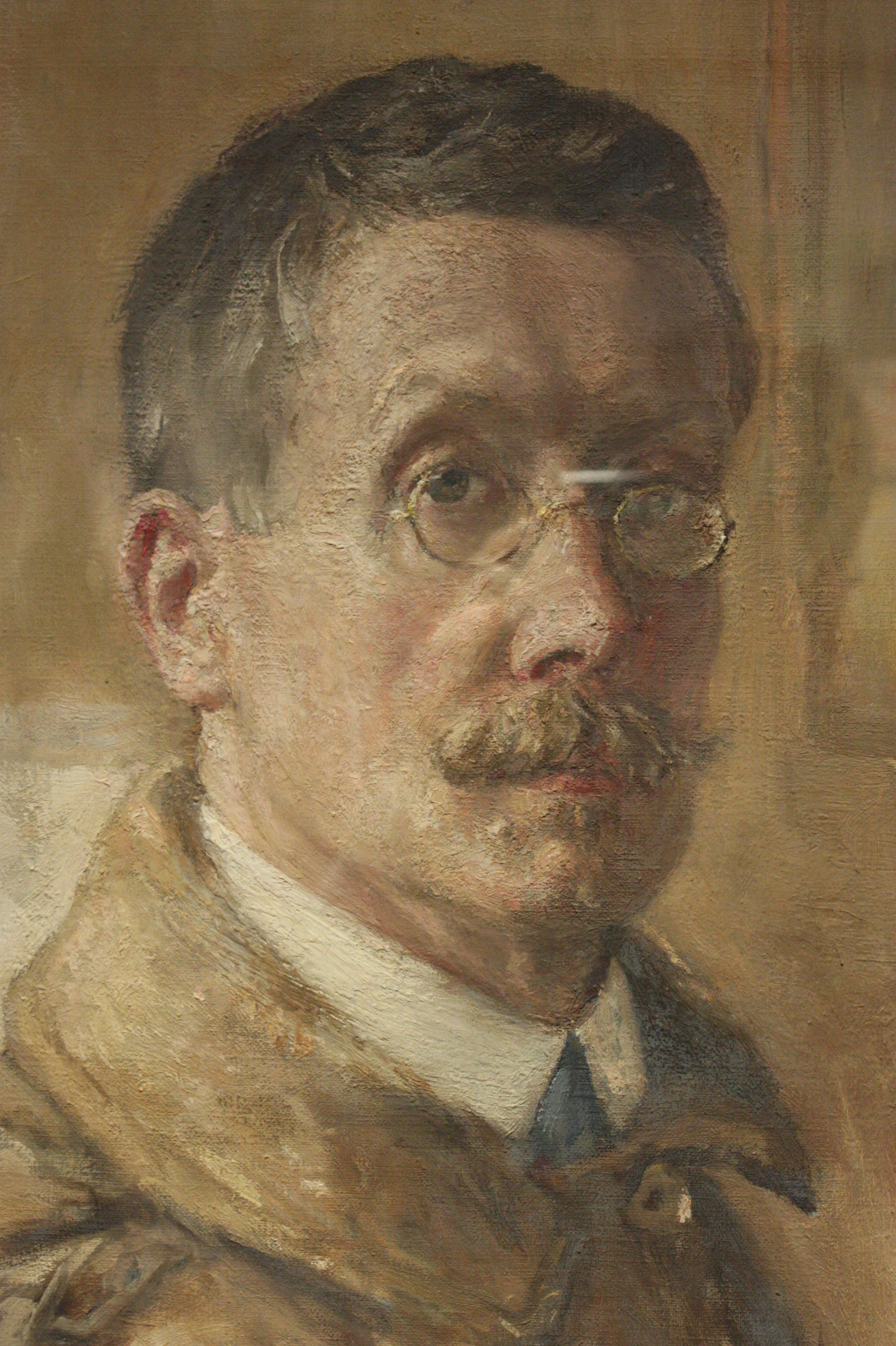
- Alexander Ignatius Roche, self-portrait c.1910
- Born: 17 August 1861; Glasgow, Scotland
- Died: 10 March 1921 (aged 59); Edinburgh, Scotland

Alexander Ignatius Roche (17 August 1861 – 10 March 1921) RSA NEAC RP was a Scottish artist in the late 19th century and an important figure in the "Glasgow Boys".

== Life ==
He was born in the Gallowgate in Glasgow, the son of a milliner, Alexander Roche. He attended St Mungo's Academy in Bridgeton, Glasgow.

He originally trained as an architect, but then changed to art, studying at the Glasgow School of Art and, from 1881, at L'Ecole des Beaux Arts in Paris. Here he studied under Gustave Boulanger and Jean-Léon Gérôme. In his time here he befriended William Kennedy, John Lavery, Thomas Millie Dow and William Stott.

In the early 1880s he joined a colony of Scots artists in Grez-sur-Loing south of Fontainebleau. On his return to Scotland in 1885 he joined with the Glasgow Boys working on murals for the 1888 International Exhibition. In 1888 he travelled to Capriwhere he befriended Fabio Fabbi and Harold Speed. In following years he visited both Venice and Florence, and married an Italian girl on the latter trip. This marriage was short-lived and they separated. As both were Catholics there seems to have never been any divorce.

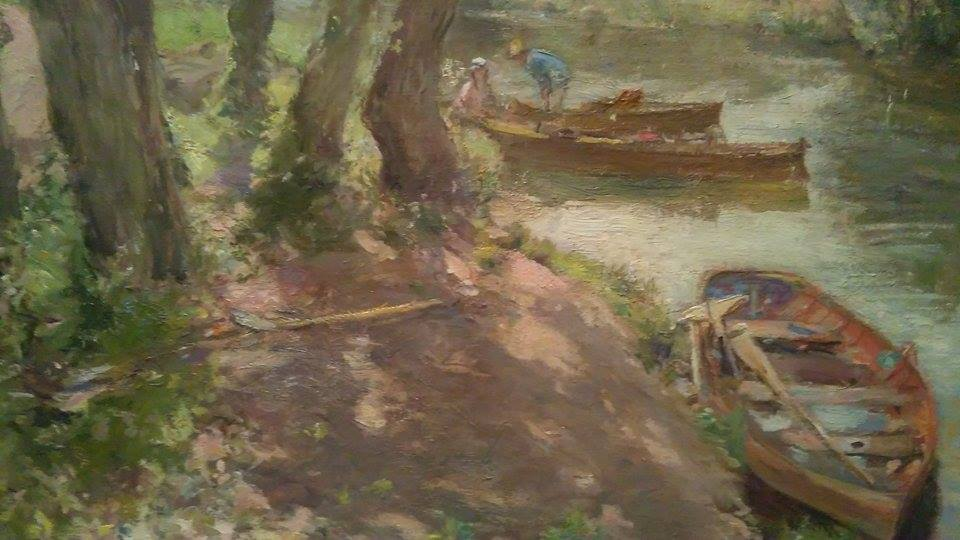
Here Ouse Slow Winding Through a Lovely Plain by Alexander Roche

In 1896 he moved from Glasgow to Edinburgh and began to distance himself from the Glasgow Boys. His work drifted from largely landscape to largely portraits.

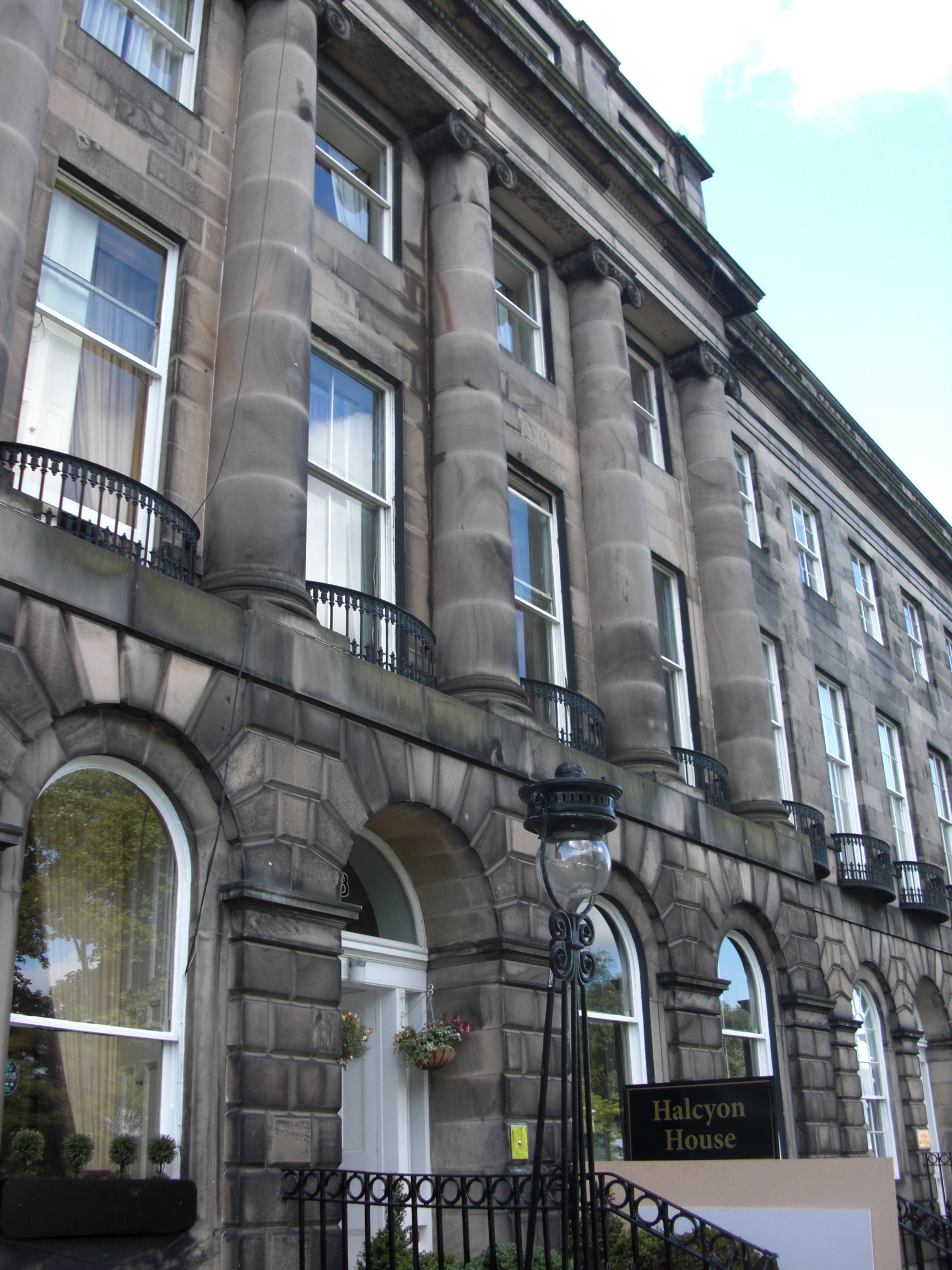
Roche's huge townhouse at 8 Royal Terrace, Edinburgh

In 1906 he remarried (possibly bigamously), to Jean Alexander, daughter of Robert Alexander. During this period they enjoyed the friendship of Joseph Crawhall.

From 1907 until 1914 they lived at 8 Royal Terrace, on Calton Hill, a very prestigious property. Around 1910 a cerebral haemorrhage caused the loss of use of its right hand and he had to retrain to paint with the left.

== Death ==
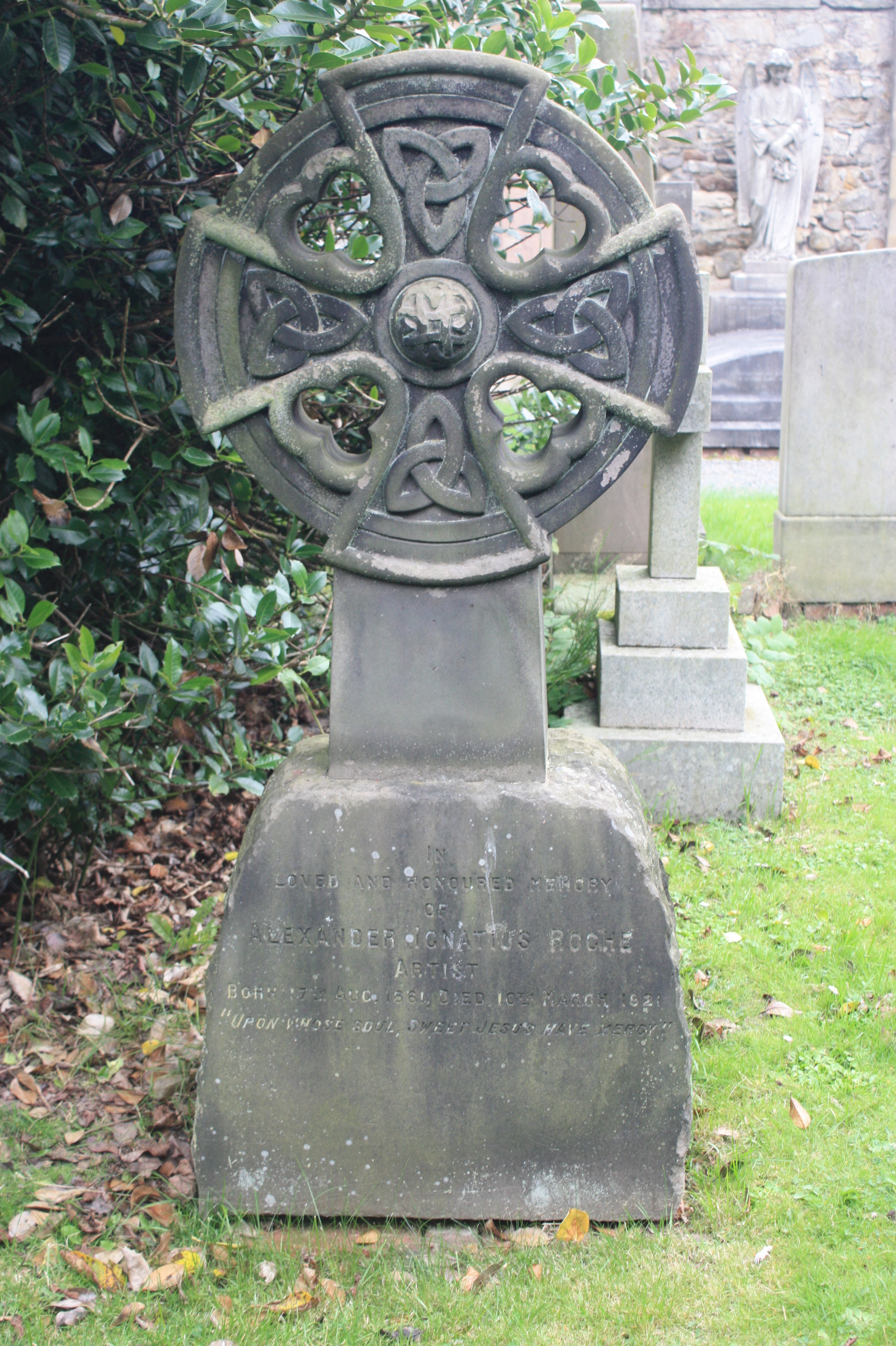
Alexander Ignatius Roche's grave, Dean Cemetery

He died in Hailes Cottage, near the Water of Leith in Slateford, Edinburgh. He is buried in the Dean Cemetery in Edinburgh near the north-east corner of the original cemetery.

== Works ==
Roche exhibited in the Royal Scottish Academy from 1887 and in the Royal Academy from 1890 to 1919.

- The Dominie's Favourites (1885)
- The Shepherdess (1890)
- Head of a Young Girl (1890) Hunterian Art Gallery
- Mrs Roberts (1895)
- Group family portrait for Andrew Carnegie (c.1900)
- Margaret (1900) Royal Scottish Academy
- Lady Reid (d.1924), (1908) Aberdeen Art Gallery
- Sir William Alexander Smith, founder of the Boys' Brigade (c.1910)
- River Ouse (1918) Kelvingrove Art Gallery
- Le Chateau Gaillard, Hunterian Art Gallery
- Corfe Castle
- Afternoon Sunshine, St Monans
- St Monans Kirk, Kirkcaldy Galleries
- A Newhaven Fishwife, The Fleming Collection
- Sir Robert Cranston
- Pittenweem, Fife
- The Prison Gate, Mogador, Morocco
- The Old Fisherman, Scottish National Gallery
- Girl in a Red Hat
- Self Portrait
- The Red Lion Inn
- Woodland and River
- The Convict Ship, Hunterian Art Gallery
- William Elphinstone Malcolm of Burnfoot (1907) Langholm Town Hall
- Flora Clift Stevenson
- Grez
- Thomas Littlejohn Galbraith, Town Clerk

== Awards and recognition ==
- Gold Medal, Munich (1891)
- Honourable Mention, Paris Salon, (1892)
- Gold Medal, Dresden (1897)
- Elected ARSA 1894
- Elected RSA 1900
