= Peabody Trust =

Housing association based in London, England

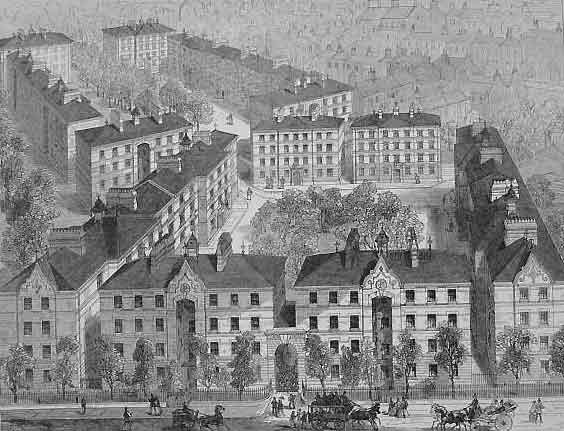
Peabody Square on Blackfriars Road, Southwark, is a typical example of an early Peabody estate, and of pre-World War I social housing in London in general.

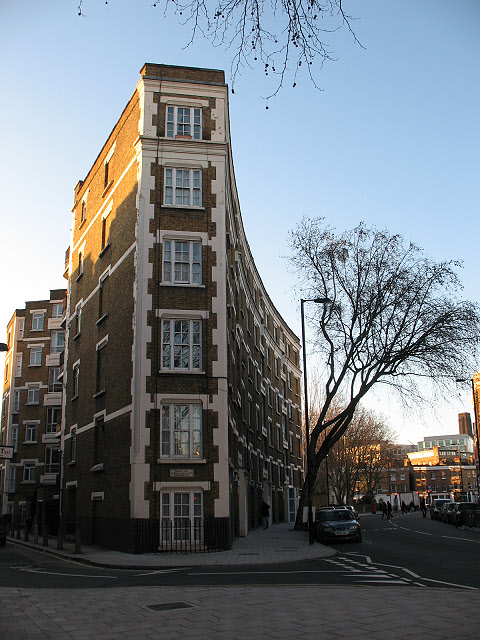
Peabody Trust housing on Marshalsea Road in Southwark.

The Peabody Trust was founded in 1862 as the Peabody Donation Fund and now brands itself simply as Peabody.

It is one of London's oldest and largest housing associations with over 100,000 homes across London and the home counties. It is also a community benefit society and urban regeneration agency.

== History ==
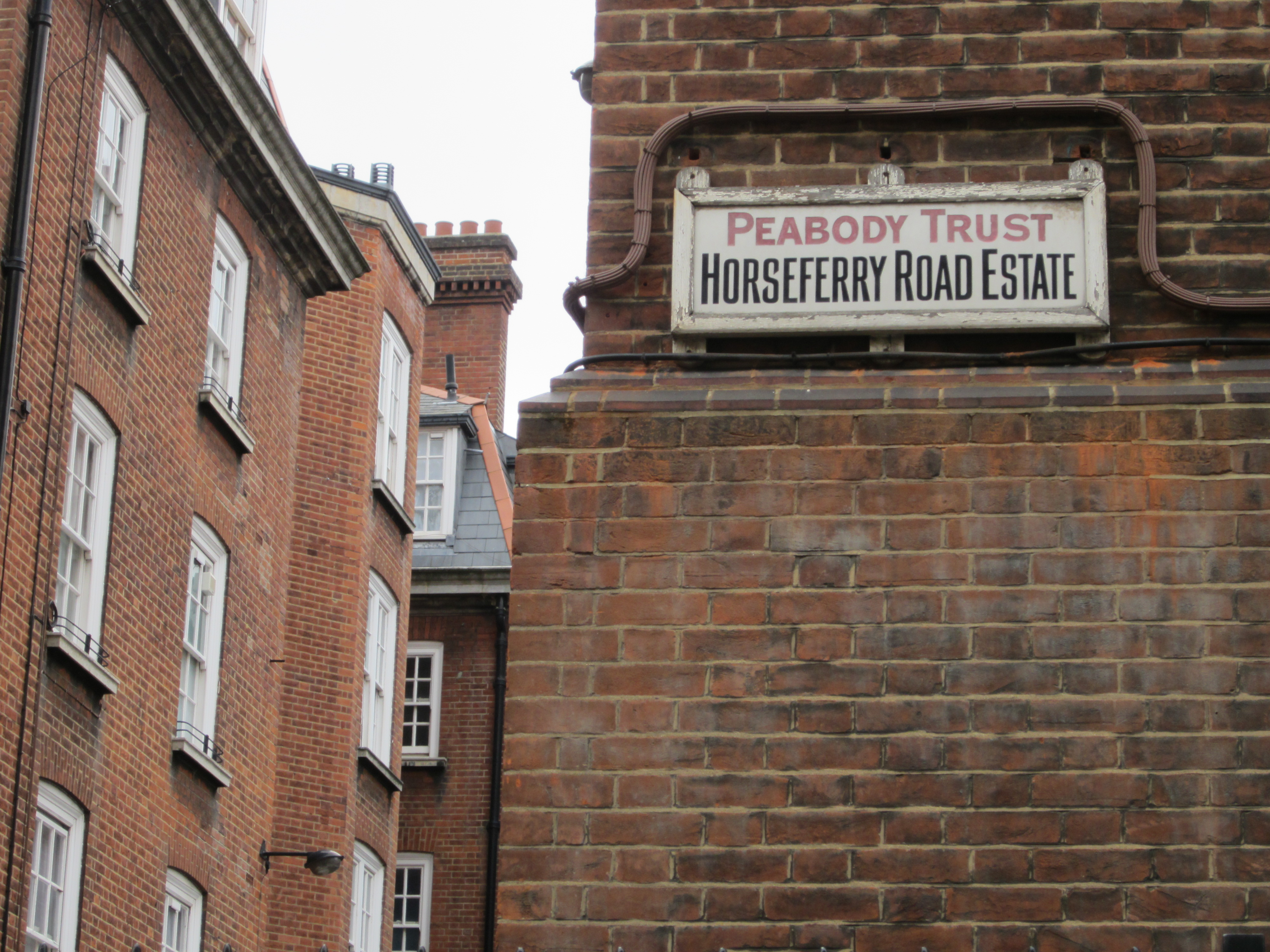
The Peabody Trust estate in Horseferry Road.

The Trust was founded in 1862 by London-based American banker George Peabody, who in the 1850s had developed a great affection for London, and determined to make a charitable gift to benefit it. His initial ideas included a system of drinking fountains (comparable to the Metropolitan Drinking Fountain and Cattle Trough Association scheme actually set up by Samuel Gurney and Edward Thomas Wakefield in 1859), or a contribution to the "ragged schools" of the Earl of Shaftesbury. In March 1859, however, he settled on establishing a model dwellings company.

Three years later, in a letter to The Times on 26 March 1862, he launched the Peabody Donation Fund, with an initial gift of £150,000. The aim of the organisation, he said, would be to "ameliorate the condition of the poor and needy of this great metropolis, and to promote their comfort and happiness". The paper reported, "We have today to announce an act of beneficence unexampled in its largeness and in the time and manner of the gift". Shortly before his death in 1869, Peabody increased his gift to £500,000.

The Peabody Trust was later constituted by Act of Parliament, stipulating its objectives to work solely within London for the relief of poverty. This was to be expressed through the provision of model dwellings for the capital's poor.

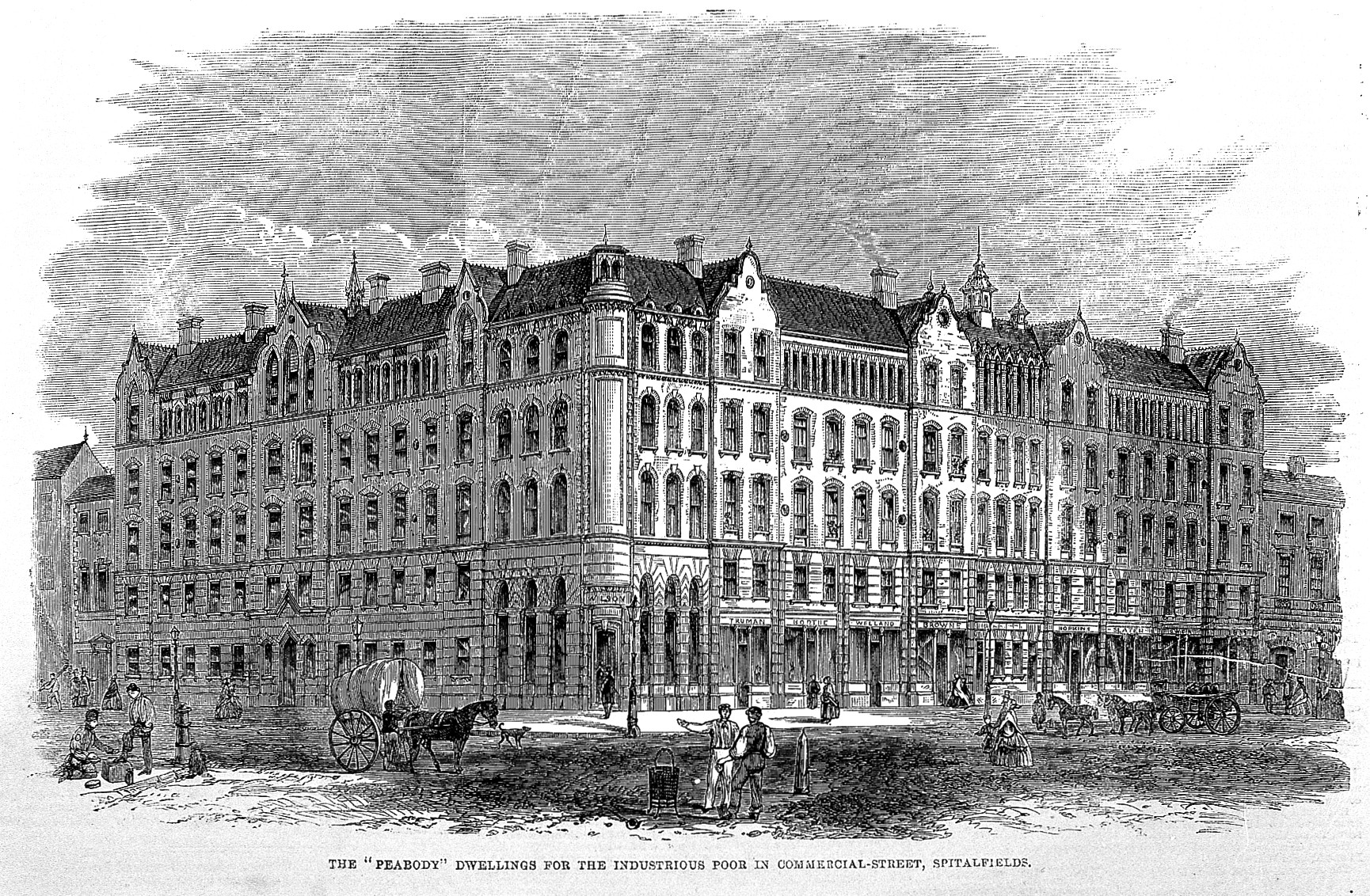
The first block of Peabody dwellings in Commercial Street, Spitalfields. A wood-engraving published in the Illustrated London News in 1863, shortly before the building opened.

The first block, designed by H. A. Darbishire in a red-brick Jacobethan style, opened in Commercial Street, Spitalfields, on 29 February 1864. It cost £22,000 to build, and contained 57 "dwellings" (i.e. flats) for the poor, nine shops with accommodation for the shopkeepers, and baths and laundry facilities on the upper floor. Water-closets were grouped in pairs by the staircases, with one shared between every two flats. This first block was followed by larger estates in Islington, Poplar, Shadwell, Chelsea, Westminster, Bermondsey, and elsewhere. By 1882 the Trust housed more than 14,600 people in 3,500 dwellings. By 1939 it owned more than 8,000 dwellings.

In its early days, the Trust imposed strict rules to ensure that its tenants were of good moral character. Rents were to be paid weekly and punctually; there was a night-time curfew and a set of moral standards to be adhered to; and the dwellings could not be used for certain trades.

== Current mission ==
Peabody states that in pursuit of its mission it will: "help people flourish by providing great homes and services and making a positive impact in communities." Its stated values are: "housing that combines affordable homes and protection, provides stability for home dwellers in a forever changing society ."

=== Thamesmead regeneration ===
Peabody is leading the regeneration of Thamesmead, Abbey Wood and Plumstead in south-east London. The Group worked with the Royal Borough of Greenwich and the London Borough of Bexley to successfully bid for Greater London Authority housing zone status, which led to a c.£80 million investment.

The new development provides thousands of new homes in the area, Peabody says it will provide firm foundations for Thamesmead's long term. However, the consultation has been controversial, as the ballot conducted in March 2020 asked the 'yes' or 'no' question: "Are you in favour of Peabody's proposal to include Lesnes Estate in their regeneration plans for South Thamesmead?". Whilst having 70% support with a 65% turnout, the word 'demolition' was not featured in the consultation, that is now the threat against many residents of the estate.

Thamesmead and the surrounding area is facing significant change since Crossrail opened at nearby Abbey Wood in 2022. Peabody has said it will capitalise on this, ensuring "the right amenities, infrastructure and transport connections are available for the long term sustainability" of the area.

== Peabody Group ==
In 2014, Gallions, Trust Thamesmead and Tilfen Land became part of the Peabody Group. The Peabody Group now comprises two housing associations, Peabody and Gallions, and a number of trading companies.

In July 2017, Peabody merged with Family Mosaic housing association under the "Peabody" name.

On 1 April 2022 Catalyst Housing became a subsidiary of Peabody Trust and was fully integrated in April 2023. The new Peabody Group is responsible for over 104,000 homes and around 220,000 customers across London and the home counties.

=== Funding ===
Housing associations borrow money to pay for new homes and improvements. In March 2011, Peabody raised £200 million on a corporate bond, at a rate among the best secured by a housing association borrowing in its own name. In 2013 it issued a public bond for £350 million. In 2020 it played a leading role in creating the Sustainability Reporting Standard for Social Housing. In 2022 it issued its first £350m Sustainable Bond and in 2023 published a report detailing the projects it spent the money on.

Peabody funded the launch of RTM FM community radio station based in Thamesmead along with Thamesmead Arts and Culture Office (TACO), That SP Studios, and Sam Skinner.

== Family Mosaic ==
Family Mosaic
- Type: Housing association
- Purpose: Housing
- Location: Head office: 45 Westminster Bridge Road, London SE1 7JB
- Region served: London, Essex and South East England
- Key people: Brendan Sarsfield (Chief Executive)
- Revenue: Turnover £230m (2015)
- Employees: Over 2000
- Website: www.familymosaic.co.uk

Prior to its merger with Peabody, Family Mosaic was a housing association in the United Kingdom. It had over 25,000 homes housing over 45,000 people and was one of the largest housing providers in London, Essex and the South East of England. Family Mosaic also provided care and support services to over 8,000 people.

Family Mosaic worked with young people, helping them into work and promoting better health.

In addition to offering specialist housing for people with support needs and social housing for general needs tenants, a third strand of Family Mosaic was its role in assisting people to get onto the property ladder through leasehold shared ownership properties. In April 2017, Family Mosaic announced that it would be launching a 111 home development for private rental tenants.

Family Mosaic also ran employment training courses and activity groups for its residents. It also offered welfare benefits advice.

Family Mosaic was a member of the G15 group of housing associations in London. In July 2017 Family Mosaic merged with Peabody Trust housing association under the "Peabody" name.

=== Subsidiaries ===
- Charlton Triangle Homes – Owned and managed 1,162 homes in the London Borough of Greenwich.
- Old Oak Housing Association – Owns and manages 669 homes in the London Borough of Hammersmith and Fulham.

== Catalyst Housing ==
Catalyst Housing is a housing association operating in London and the south-east of England. On 1 April 2022 Catalyst became a subsidiary of The Peabody Trust. The intention is to move to full integration by April 2023. Once complete, the new Peabody Group will be responsible for 104,000 homes and around 220,000 customers across London and the home counties.

== Controversies ==
In 2012, Family Mosaic was paid an out of court settlement by Haringey London Borough Council because of the council's failure to pay additional costs of over £108,000 for two care home residents.

A number of complaints have been made against Family Mosaic in the national and local press, including heating being cut-off for five months of the year, a ceiling collapsing, poor administration at one of its care homes, and a rodent infestation. In 2014, Family Mosaic took the unusual step of apologising to its tenants after a malfunctioning computer system led to an increase in complaints about its repairs service.

In February 2022, the body of Peabody tenant Sheila Seleoane was discovered in the hallway of her flat, with the Coroner later concluding that she had collapsed and died in August 2019. Investigations revealed that she had lain dead and decomposing on the floor for over two-and-a-half years. During this period neighbours tried repeatedly to raise the alarm regarding a putrid smell and maggot infestation without success while Peabody, who were aware that Ms Seleoane had not paid her rent since August 2019, started taking rent payments out of her Universal Credit benefits in March 2020 and cut off the gas supply to the flat in June 2020.

In June 2023, The Housing Ombudsman made a finding of severe maladministration in respect of Peabody, relating to its failures to properly deal with reports of anti-social behaviour and noise nuisance, which led to a resident terminating her own tenancy to escape the situation.

In October 2023, The Housing Ombudsman made a finding of three counts of severe maladministration against Peabody and ordered it to pay residents £8,300. This related to two separate investigations which found that it had left one household with intermittent hot water for nearly two years and another with leaks in multiple rooms for three years.

Since taking over much of Thamesmead in 2014, Peabody have demolished large parts of the Lesnes Estate, including Binsey and Coralline Walk. Described as a "battleground against social cleansing", the redevelopment plans have been controversial with the working-class residents, many of whom are from the East End and West Africa. In April 2024, housing activists occupied multiple empty houses on the Lesnes Estate, as a protest against the demolition of the Greater London Council-built 1960s-era estate, demanding to speak to John Lewis, executive director for Thamesmead. Residents started a legal challenge against demolition in January 2026.

In April 2025, BBC News published an article on its website detailing a long running fight by a group of Peabody tenants living in the Nags Head Estate, east London, to have mould and damp in their homes rectified. This included their engaging solicitors and health workers from the charity Medact, to progress their case.

== See also ==
- Strawberry Vale Estate
- Clays Lane Estate
- BedZED
- List of existing model dwellings
