= G15 (housing associations) =

Group of large social landlords in London

The G15 is an organisation of the largest housing associations in and around Greater London in the United Kingdom, which collectively are responsible for managing in the region of 600,000 homes in London. They state their purpose as "working to solve the housing crisis by delivering good quality, affordable homes of all types".

In February 2023, the G15 group confirmed that Fiona Fletcher-Smith, group CEO of L&Q, has been appointed as the network’s chair. The moves came after confirmation that current vice-chair Richard Hill (CEO of One Housing), will be joining BPHA as its new head in April.

== Membership ==
The G15 originally had 15 members, but some of them have since merged. The current members are:

Rank	Name	Date founded	Significant mergers	No. of dwellings	Website
1st	A2Dominion Group	1947	In 2008, A2 and Dominion merged, forming one of the UK’s largest housing groups, A2Dominion	39,000	a2dominion.co.uk
2nd	Clarion Housing Group	2016	Formed by merger of former G15 members Affinity Sutton and Circle in November 2016	125,000	clarionhg.com
3rd	The Guinness Partnership	1890	Founded by Edward Guinness, 1st Earl of Iveagh, a great grandson of the founder of the Guinness Brewery, to help homeless people in London and Dublin.	60,000	guinnesspartnership.com/
4th	Hyde Group	1967	Established in 1967. Swallowed many smaller housing associations in Early 2000's. All were branded Hyde in 2011 under its One Hyde, One Vision initiative.	50,000	hyde-housing.co.uk
5th	L&Q	1963	Former G15 member East Thames merged into L&Q in December 2016	105,000	lqgroup.org.uk
6th	Metropolitan Thames Valley	1963	Metropolitan Housing Trust merged with Thames Valley Homes	57,000	metropolitan.org.uk
7th	Notting Hill Genesis	1963	Former G15 members Genesis and Notting Hill merged in 2018	68,000	nhg.org.uk
8th	Peabody Trust	1862	Former G15 member Family Mosaic merged into Peabody in July 2017. Former G15 member Catalyst merged into Peabody in April 2022.	104,000	peabody.org.uk
9th	One Housing Group	1962	Formed by merger of Community Housing Association (1972) and Toynbee HA (1962). Now part of Riverside Group	17,000	onehousing.co.uk
10th	Southern Housing	2022	Former G15 members Optivo and Southern Housing Group merged in 2022	78,000	southernhousing.org.uk
11th	Network Homes	1974	Founded as Brent People's Housing Association. Now part of Sovereign Network Group	21,000	networkhomes.org.uk
