= East Thames housing association =

East Thames Limited (formerly East Thames Group) is a subsidiary of L&Q, one of the G15, a club of the largest associations in London, housing association formerly based in East London, England.

In 1979, East London Housing Association was formed by the merger of Trinity, East of London and Capital Housing Associations. By creating the Boleyn and Forest Housing Society in 1981, East London Housing Association became one of the first in the country to provide homes for low-cost ownership. In 1993, East London Housing Association sets up a new subsidiary, Care and Support Services, for people with support needs.1995 saw East Thames Housing Group become the new name of East London Housing Association, reflecting its involvement in a wider area, which expanded to Essex and the Thames Gateway.

In 2016, East Thames Group entered into a three-way merger discussions to form the largest housing association in Europe, with Hyde Group & London & Quadrant Housing Trust, but Hyde Group later withdrew. Discussions continued with London & Quadrant Housing Trust, and they merged on 6 December 2016.
