= Paddock (war rooms) =

Alternate U.K. Cabinet War Room bunker, 1939-1944

- Part of Cabinet War Room
- 109 Brook Road, Dollis Hill, London, NW2 7DZ in England, United Kingdom
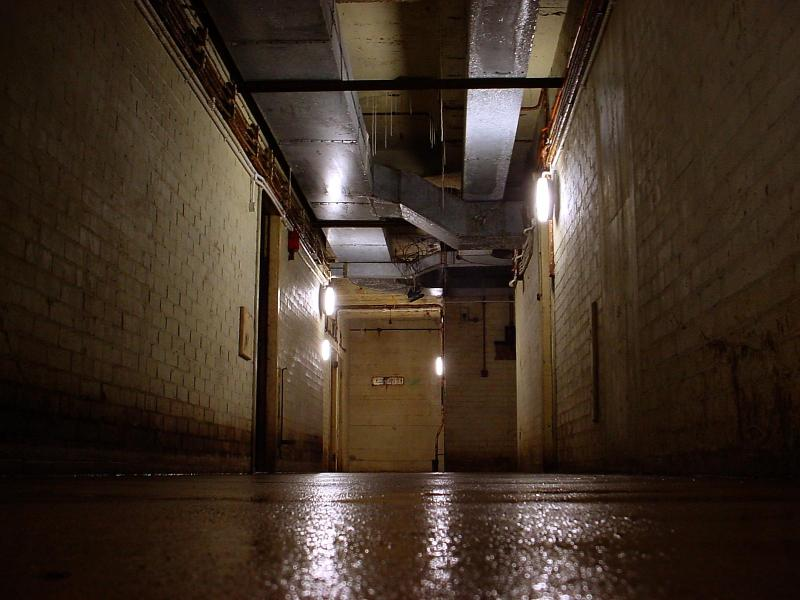
- The main corridor of the Paddock bunker

Site information
- Type: Bunker
- Owner: originally: HM Government now: Network Homes
- Controlled by: originally: War Cabinet
- Open to the public: Yes; 2-3 times per year
- Condition: Partially preserved

Location
- Paddock (war rooms) (London Borough of Brent)
- Coordinates: 51°33′44″N 0°14′19″W

Site history
- Built: January 1939; 87 years ago
- Built by: Ismay & Hollis
- In use: 1944; 82 years ago
- Materials: Reinforced concrete
- Fate: Decommissioned
- Battles/wars: World War II

Garrison information
- Designations: "historic importance and significance"

Paddock is the codeword for an alternative Cabinet War Room bunker for Winston Churchill's World War II government, located at 109 Brook Road, Dollis Hill, northwest London, NW2 7DZ; under a corner of the Post Office Research Station site.

== History ==
The name derives from the nearby Paddock Road NW2, in turn named after a nineteenth-century stud farm, the Willesden Paddocks, situated nearby.

The bomb proof bunker was constructed 40 feet (12 metres) underground from reinforced concrete in total secrecy in 1939, but only rarely used during the war, with only two meetings of the War Cabinet being held there. It comprises some thirty-seven rooms on three floors. The facility included offices for the prime minister and Cabinet, but no living accommodation. Neville's Court, a nearby civilian block of apartments without strengthening, was to be used for this purpose.

It was taken out of use in 1944. It is semi-derelict, with original equipment abandoned and rusted, and a certain amount of water ingress which is kept at bay by an electric extraction pump.

Paddock was used after World War II by the General Post Office (GPO) for research and development and by the Post Office Research Laboratories Sports and Social Club. Paddock lay unused from when the Post Office moved to Martlesham Heath (Suffolk) and vacated the site in 1976, until Sovereign purchased the site (including Paddock) in 1997.

The bunker is now owned by Sovereign Network Group, an affordable housing association which is responsible for the properties now occupying part of the former research station site above. It used to be open to the public two or three times a year, with free guided tours provided by volunteers from the Subterranea Britannica organisation. It featured on the Channel 5 programme "Underground Britain".

== See also ==
- Military citadels under London
