= Packington Estate =

Housing estate in Islington, London

Coordinates: 51.5349°N 0.0953°W

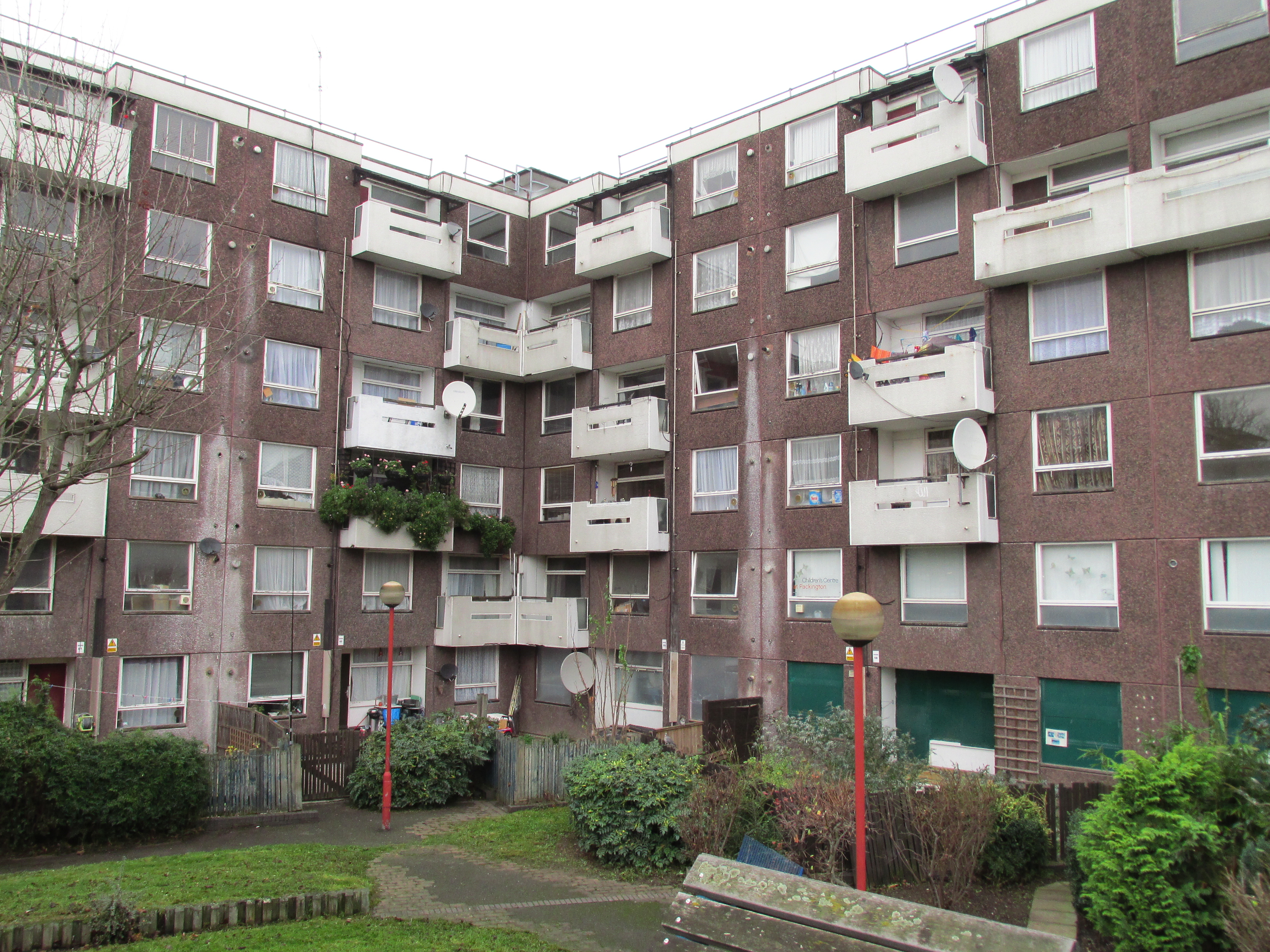
- The estate in 2015
- Interactive map of Packington Estate

General information
- Location: London, England
- Area: Islington
- No. of units: 538

Construction
- Constructed: 1960s
- Authority: Islington London Borough Council

Refurbishment
- Units: 791
- Contractor: Rydon

Other information
- Governing body: Hyde Group

The Packington Estate is a large council estate in Islington, London.

== History ==
The Estate was built in the 1960s by Islington Council. In 2006, it was transferred to the Hyde Group, a housing association. The lead contractor for the redevelopment was Rydon, with a £130 million contract over eight years, replacing 538 structurally defective flats with 791 mixed-tenure houses and flats.

In November 2016, a new park on the Regent's Canal was opened called Canalside Square.
