= Family intervention tenancy =

Type of housing tenancy in the United Kingdom

A Family Intervention Tenancy (FITs) is a type of housing tenancy in England and Wales that can be granted under the Housing and Regeneration Act 2008. A Family intervention tenancy only occurs where a tenant is guilty of anti-social behaviour.

Section 297 of the Housing & Regeneration Act 2008 provides local housing authorities and registered social landlords in England and Wales with the power to offer Family Intervention Tenancies. FITs came into force on 1 January 2009. A tenant is not obligated to enter into a FIT.
