= Ada Lewis-Hill =

British musician and philanthropist (1844–1906)

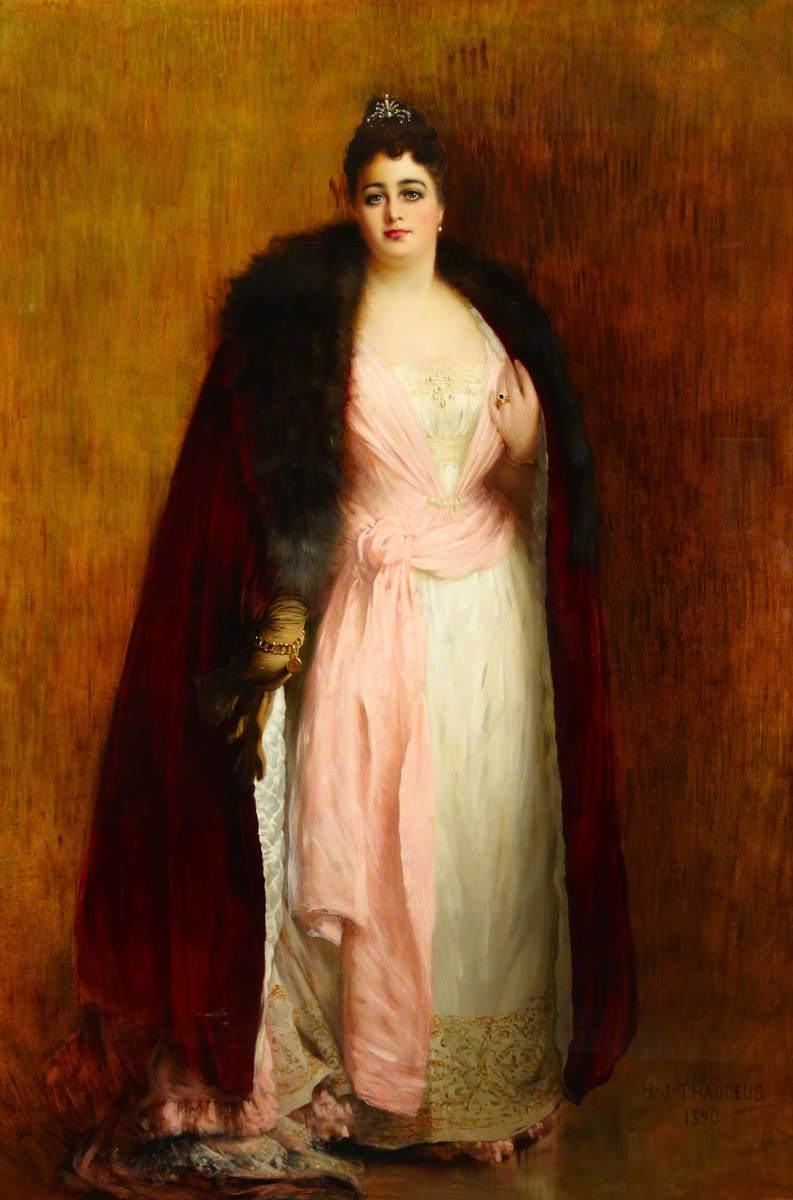
- Ada Lewis-Hill, painted by Henry Jones Thaddeus in 1890
- Born: Ada Hannah Davis; 26 April 1844
- Died: 13 October 1906 (aged 62)
- Relatives: Hope Temple (sister)

Ada Hannah Lewis-Hill born (26 April 1844–13 October 1906) was an English amateur musician and philanthropist.

She was a well-known financier of the arts and lover of music, and played the violin and cello; however she was not considered particularly gifted.

Ada Davies was born on 29 June 1844 into a Jewish family in Liverpool and was the third of ten children. One of her younger sisters was Hope Temple.

She was brought up in Dublin, where she married the financier and philanthropist Samuel Lewis in 1867, and lived with him in Grosvenor Square until his death in 1901. Ada Lewis was left with a fortune of £2.6 million following her husband's death, of which over £1 million was left to various charities. On 13 July 1904, Ada Lewis married William James Montagu Lewis-Hill, "a noted Jewish moneylender to the aristocracy".

In 1905, she founded the Ada Lewis Nurses' Institute. As of 1906, she became one of the two wealthiest women in the United Kingdom.

Lewis-Hill died of cancer on 13 October 1906 and was buried in Hoop Lane Jewish Cemetery in Golders Green, London, together with Samuel. Upon her death, she endowed the Royal Academy of Music with fifteen scholarships at a cost of nearly £20,000 and generous yearly subscriptions. She left her Stradivarius violin to the president of the Royal Academy for the use of the Ada Lewis scholars. The Ada Lewis Women's Lodging House was also opened in her honour in 1913, to provide housing for single, lower-middle class working women.
