= The Sanctuary Group =

The Sanctuary Group may refer to:

- The UK-based organisation which includes Sanctuary Housing
- The UK-based organisation which includes Sanctuary Records
