= Mardyke (disambiguation) =

Mardyke may refer to:

- Mardyke, a district of Cork, Ireland containing:
  - Mardyke (UCC), a sports venue associated with University College Cork (UCC)
  - Mardyke (cricket ground), home ground of Cork County Cricket Club
- Mardyke (river), a tributary of the River Thames.
- Mardyke Estate, a housing development in east London.

== See also ==
- Mardyck near Dunkirk in France, also spelt Mardijk and Mardyke
- Fort Mardyke between Mardyck and Dunkirk, English from 1657 to 1662
