= Tony Gallagher (businessman) =

British property developer (born 1951)

Sir Tony Gallagher
- Born: Anthony Christopher Gallagher; November 1951 (age 74)
- Occupation: property developer
- Known for: founder and former chairman of Gallagher Estates and Gallagher Developments

Sir Anthony Christopher Gallagher (born November 1951) is a British billionaire property developer, and the founder and former chairman of Gallagher Estates and Gallagher Developments.

== Early life ==
Anthony Christopher Gallagher was born in November 1951. His father was an Irish builder, who settled in the Midlands after the Second World War.

== Career ==
At various times, Gallagher has specialised in buying and preparing land plots for residential and commercial development, as well as investing directly in retail parks.

In February 2017, London & Quadrant, a housing association, completed a deal to buy the private land company Gallagher Estates for £505 million. Before the company's sale, Gallagher owned more than 45,000 house building plots throughout Britain. The sale of Gallagher Estates is understood to have not included Gallagher's commercial development plots and retail park assets.

The capital from the sale of Gallagher Estates were reinvested in Gallagher's private rented sector business, which holds a portfolio of properties in London and other big cities.

Gallagher was knighted in the 2020 Birthday Honours for services to land development and the property business.

== Personal life ==
He is a Tory donor and hosted David Cameron's 50th birthday party at his mansion in Oxfordshire. In 2015 he gave more than half a million pounds to the Conservative Party.

Gallagher owns Sarsden House, a Grade II listed 17th-century mansion near Chipping Norton, Oxfordshire. It was formerly owned by the politician Shaun Woodward, who in 2005 was selling it for £25 million.
