= Sanctuary Group =

May refer to

- Sanctuary Records
- Sanctuary Housing
