= Catalyst Housing =

English housing association

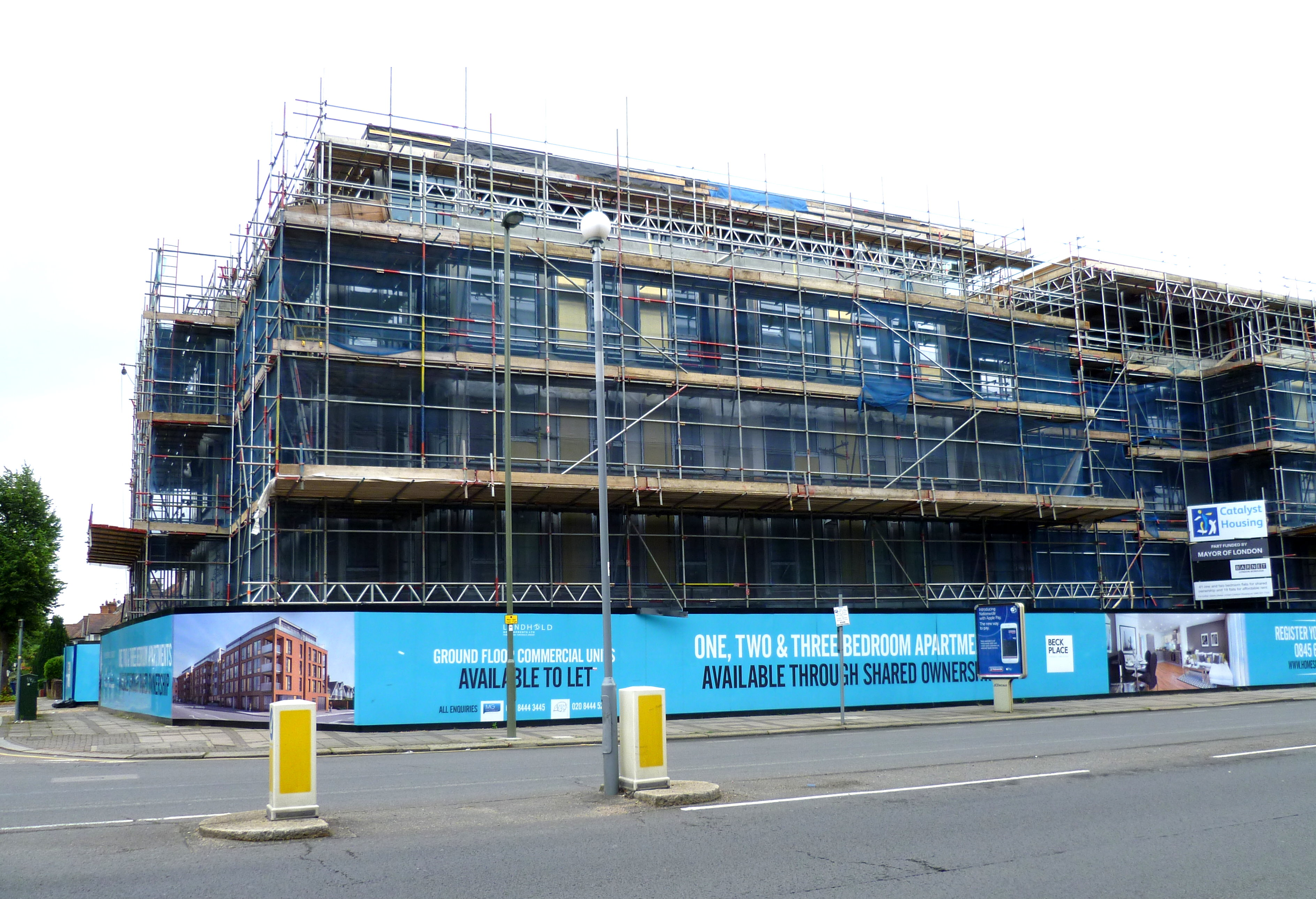
A Catalyst Housing project in Whetstone, London, in conjunction with the Mayor of London.

Catalyst Housing is a housing association operating in London and the south-east of England. On 1 April 2022 Catalyst became a subsidiary of the Peabody Trust.

It was formed by the merger in 2002 of Kensington Housing Trust (formed 1926), Ealing Family Housing Association (formed 1963) and Northcote HA. Kensington Housing Trust operated in West London and as of 2009 owned around 2,500 homes in and around Kensington. The main offices were on Portobello Road.

Catalyst Housing has been involved in a number of projects with the Mayor of London to build social housing.

It is a founder member of the G15 group of the largest housing associations in London.

== History ==
=== Cathy Come Home ===
In the early 1960s the UK was emerging from the aftermath of the second world war and although the economy was reviving, poor and overcrowded housing conditions persisted in many areas. For a large number of people on low incomes, the only way to find somewhere to live was to rent privately. Accommodation was often very inadequate, tenancy agreements insecure and rents high.

The documentary Cathy Come Home (directed by Ken Loach and shown on TV in 1966) was instrumental in highlighting the issues of homelessness, unemployment and poverty and it helped alert the public to the scale of the country’s housing crisis.

=== Ealing Family Housing Association ===
Against this backdrop, Ealing Family Housing Association (EFHA) was established in 1963. Founded by a group of Ealing residents, the association wanted to improve local housing conditions and provide housing opportunities for local people who could not compete on the open market.

Ealing Family Housing Association continued to grow and invest in affordable housing. In 1980 it set up Northcote Housing Association to provide low cost homeownership schemes. Four years later (1984) it took on responsibility for running the Southall Day Centre. In 1998 the Ealing Family Group (as EFHA and its subsidiaries were known) established Fortunegate Community Housing to take over and regenerate 1,500 homes from Brent council. In 2001 Ealing Family acquired Barnet’s residential care portfolio.

In 2006 Ealing Family Housing Association changed its name to Catalyst Communities Housing Association.

=== Kensington Housing Trust ===
In the 1920s the housing situation in North Kensington saw an average of 2.16 people to every room. Over 13,000 Kensington families lived in basements and many children slept on floors or chairs.

In 1926 the Kensington Housing Trust (KHT) was established, set up mainly by wealthy local residents who were horrified at the state of housing in the borough. The first chair was Lord Balfour of Burleigh. KHT’s first properties came from the Great Western Railway company who transferred the management of company houses over to the trust. These properties were refurbished and let out at an affordable rent.

In 1928 enough money had been raised to build the first KHT flats at Crosfield House. This purpose-built property provided accommodation for 36 families from slum tenements. The trust recognised that housing should only be a part of their service so a benevolent fund was also established to help families go on holiday, pay for doctors’ bills and help residents leave London to convalesce.

In 2002 Kensington Housing Trust joined Ealing Family Housing Association and Northcote Housing Association to become subsidiaries of the Catalyst Housing Group. On 30 September 2011, the member companies within Catalyst Housing Group became one organisation, Catalyst Housing Limited.

=== Aldwyck Housing Group ===
In 1966 five businessmen met in Harpenden and agreed to create affordable housing for this community. In 1968 the first 26 flats were built in Harpenden by a builder who lived at Aldwyckbury Manor. This is where the name Aldwyck Housing Group derived from.

In the intervening years Aldwyck grew to cover much of Bedfordshire, Buckinghamshire, Cambridgeshire, Hertfordshire and Northamptonshire, providing over 11,000 homes.

In 2019, Aldwyck merged with Catalyst Housing Limited.

=== Peabody Merger ===
On 1 April 2022 Catalyst became a subsidiary of The Peabody Trust. The intention is to move to full integration by April 2023. Once complete, the new Peabody Group will be responsible for 104,000 homes and around 220,000 customers across London and the home counties.
