= Southern Housing Group =

Southern Housing Group was one of the largest and oldest housing associations in the UK, managing 30,000 homes for over 77,000 residents in London and the south east of England.

== History ==
Southern Housing Group began as the Samuel Lewis Housing Trust in 1901 when Samuel Lewis, an English money-lender and philanthropist, died and left an endowment of £670,000 to set up a charitable trust to provide housing for the poor (equivalent to about £30 million in modern terms).

Samuel Lewis Housing Trust completed its first properties in 1910 at Liverpool Road in Islington, London. These were:

- Ixworth Place, Chelsea (1912)
- Warner Road, Camberwell (1913–1919)
- Vanston Place, Walham Green, Fulham (1920–22)
- Dalston Lane, Hackney (1923)
- Lisgar Terrace, Fulham (1927)
- Amhurst Road, Hackney (1931–37)
- Amhurst Park, Stamford Hill (1938–39)

In 2001 the Trust changed its name to Southern Housing Group to reflect the changing nature and scope of the organisation. In 2010, James Butcher Housing Association Ltd and South Wight Housing Association Ltd were amalgamated into a single charitable housing association, Southern Housing Group Ltd.

In April 2019 The Guardian published allegations that the Group was punishing one of its tenants for speaking out about planning breaches in their block which discriminated against social tenants. In response, the Trust stated that it had been in ongoing communication with the tenants for some weeks, which was unrelated to any contact with the press.

A proposed merger with Sanctuary Housing was abandoned in April 2021.

Southern Housing Group merged with housing provider Optivo in December 2022 to form a new housing provider called Southern Housing.
