= Samuel Lewis (financier) =

English money-lender and philanthropist (1837-1901)

- Born: 1837; Birmingham, U.K.
- Died: 13 January 1901; London, U.K.
- Occupation(s): Financier, philanthropist

Samuel Lewis (1837 – 13 January 1901), was an English money-lender and philanthropist.

== Early life ==
Samuel Lewis was born in Birmingham in 1837.

== Career ==
Lewis began work when thirteen years old. He became a salesman of steel pens, then opened a jeweller's shop, and finally entered the business with which his name was most identified, that of money-lending. He became the most fashionable money-lender of his day. Nearly every noble family in Great Britain is said to have been more or less in business connection with Lewis. He left nearly twenty million dollars, of which five million went to charity on the death of his widow, Ada Davis Lewis, a sister of Hope Temple, the composer.

== Death and legacy ==
Samuel Lewis died in London in 1901. Upon his death, he left an endowment of £670,000 to set up a charitable trust to provide housing for the poor. A huge sum at the time and one that equates to £30 million at today's values.

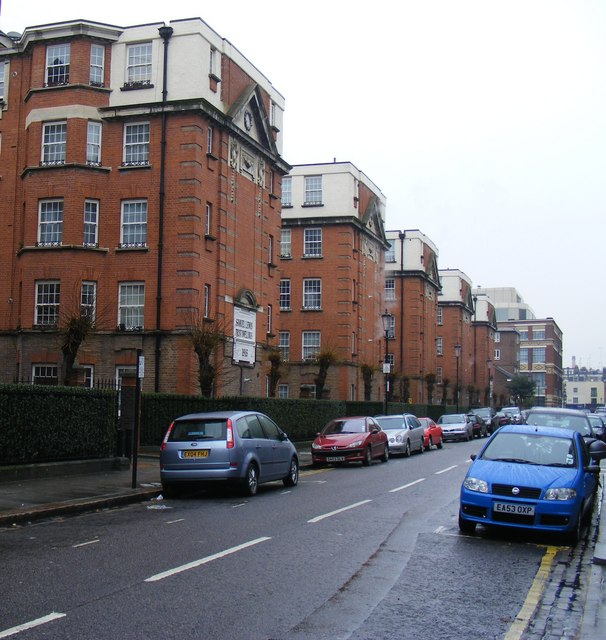
The Samuel Lewis Trust Buildings in Chelsea, London.

Samuel Lewis Housing Trust completed its first properties in 1910 at Liverpool Road in Islington, London. This was followed by other large London schemes at:

- Ixworth Place, Chelsea (1912)
- Warner Road, Camberwell (1913–1919)
- Vanston Place, Walham Green (1920–22)
- Dalston Lane, Hackney (1923)
- Lisgar Terrace, Fulham (1927)
- Amhurst Road, Hackney (1931–37)
- Amhurst Park, Stamford Hill (1938–39)

all of which carry the name Samuel Lewis Housing Trust Estate. Samuel Lewis Housing Trust continued to develop and manage rented properties to become one of the largest providers of rented accommodation in the South East.

In 2001 the Trust changed its name to Southern Housing Group to reflect the changing nature and scope of the organization.
