= National Housing Federation =

- Abbreviation: NHF
- Legal status: Private company limited by guarantee
- Purpose: Social housing in England
- Headquarters: Lion Court 25 Proctor Street London WC1V 6NY
- Location: London, WC1
- Region served: England
- Members: Housing associations
- Chief Executive: Kate Henderson
- Budget: £13,838,000 (2025)
- Website: housing.org.uk

The National Housing Federation (NHF) is a trade association for member housing associations in England.

== Function ==
The National Housing Federation (NHF) is a trade association representing housing associations, providers of social housing, in England. The NHF head office is situated near Holborn tube station in London with a second office in Bristol.

It represents the work of member housing associations and campaigns on a range of housing and social policy issues. The NHF's members provide approximately two and a half million homes for more than five million people. Each year they invest in a diverse range of neighbourhood projects that help create stronger communities.

Members of the NHF possess approximately two million five hundred thousand residences.

== Areas of activity ==
The NHF campaigns at a local and national level to ensure housing associations can continue to deliver affordable housing, contributes to the housing and social policy agenda on issues such as sustainability, care and support, equality and homelessness, organises events including conferences and exhibitions for the social housing sector, provides training specifically aimed at housing professionals and member organisation board members, publishes guides, books, manuals, online resources and free downloadable documents for housing professionals and delivers services encompassing a range of organisational and business support for member organisations and their tenants.

The NHF host a series of conferences each year for housing professionals, including the annual Housing Community Summit in Liverpool. Their 2018 summit was opened by Prime Minister Theresa May.

== History ==
The NHF was formerly known as the National Federation of Housing Associations, which was situated at 88 Old Street, London. It has also previously occupied premises in Gray's Inn Road. They are now based in Holborn.
