= Lender option borrower option =

Long term borrowing instrument available in the United Kingdom

Lender option borrower option or lender's option borrower's option (LOBO) is a long term borrowing instrument available in the United Kingdom. They involve periodic interest re-fixings, which incorporates two linked options:

- lender's option: option for the lender to set revised (usually higher) interest rates at predetermined interest reset dates such as annually.
- borrower's option: linked option for the borrower (exercisable only if the lender's option is exercised) to pay the revised interest rate or to redeem the bond although that may involve exit fees.

They are provided by banks and the loan contract runs for between 40 and 70 years. There is no regulatory body responsible for overseeing their use.

== Origins ==
Public bodies are able to borrow money through government Public Works Loan Board (PWLB) loans, however borrowing from banks in the form of LOBOs were prevalent from the early 2000s. A certain amount of borrowing from banks had been permitted since the late 1970s. At this time, it was often the case (although certainly not always) that a loan might involve a borrower's or a lender's option (BO or LO), with the embedding of these dependent on prevailing interest rates and the council's own needs at the time. Such BOs or LOs might offer early repayment, or changes in the margin or rate-fixing frequency. LOBOs existed at this time too, and (as would be expected) offered the borrower a chance to repay at no penalty if the lender's choice of new terms was unacceptable; rarer were rather more flexible sequences like BOLOs or BOLOBOs. These all rather faded from use in the late 1980s - early 1990s, and were replaced by "straight" fixed-rate term loans. Modern, more complicated LOBOs (that is, those from c. 2000) were made available with low teaser rates, cheaper than PWLB loans so they appeared to be an attractive alternative. Few councils had access to the complex option valuation models required, nor the market data needed as inputs for such models.

== Criticism ==
LOBOs have provoked criticism because of high initial profits to the lender from day one and high subsequent interest rates. Clive Betts, MP and chairman of the Communities and Local Government Committee, has called for an inquiry into ‘outrageous’ LOBO loans. Defences to these criticisms have been offered by some of the borrowers.

== Local councils ==
Banks, including Barclays and Royal Bank of Scotland (RBS), provide LOBO loans to about 240 UK councils (63% of all councils in 2013) with a total value of £15 billion. Out of this £15 billion it is estimated that about £1 billion in upfront profits was made by the lenders. LOBOs are currently almost a fifth of all council borrowing.

LOBOs were recommended to councils by paid specialist financial advisers some of whom may have also been paid commission by the banks providing the LOBOs.

At least 12 councils have the most expensive types of LOBO loan. Most of these have "inverse floaters" taken out with RBS - interest rates for the loan are increased if general bank lending rates decrease.

As a direct consequence of making repayments on LOBOs, councils have had to make major cuts in services to their residents. It has been calculated that if councils were free to relinquish their LOBO contracts at no penalty and instead borrow at a more typical market rate it would save them about £145 million for 2015 alone. Some councils are considering taking legal action.

Some residents of councils with large LOBO loan books have requested that auditors take their council to court under provisions in the Audit Commission Act. Newham resident and Green Party spokesperson Rachel Collinson was the first to do so, asking then auditor of Newham Council, PwC, to declare the spending on LOBO loans to be ultra vires, or technically illegal, being beyond the council's authorised powers. This is because LOBOs are packaged derivatives, complex financial products that councils are not permitted to purchase. The precedent for this was set in the court case against Hammersmith and Fulham in 1992. Newham, however say LOBOS have saved them £65 m between 2002 and 2015, and their interest payments were halved.

=== Examples ===
- Newham London Borough Council has £563 million of LOBOs, more than anywhere else in the country. It pays annual interest of up to 7.6%.
- Cornwall Council are servicing nearly 30 LOBOs totalling £394 million. The council is locked into some of the deals until the year 2078, paying interest at more than double the current market rate.
- Wolverhampton City Council has 21 LOBOs worth £93.8 million with interest rates of between 3.6% and 4.95%. Projected repayments are £273.8 million at £4 million per year.
- Walsall Metropolitan Borough Council has at least £115 million of LOBOs at high interest rates.
- Plymouth City Council is paying interest rates of 3.65 per cent to 4.82 per cent on LOBOs, totalling £100 million. It has 14 active LOBOs.
- Cambridgeshire County Council has LOBOs totalling £79.5 million with Barclays, Dexia and Siemens Financial Services.
- Bolton Metropolitan Borough Council As of 2015 had nine LOBOs of £79 million total.
- Worcestershire County Council has £70 million of LOBOs. interest rates, As of 2015, of 3.66 percent and 3.8 percent. One loan was taken out in 2008, on a 69-year term, the other in 2010, on a 50-year term.

== Housing associations ==
Up to 30 housing associations have bought up to a total of £1.25 billion of LOBOs.
