= Clarion Housing Group =

British housing association

- Founded: 2016
- Type: Housing association
- Purpose: Housing
- Location: Greater London House, Hampstead Road, London NW1 7QX
- Key people: Clare Miller
- Website: clarionhg.com

Clarion Housing Group is the largest housing association in the United Kingdom with 125,000 properties across more than 170 local authorities. Clarion Provides homes to over 350,000 people.

Clarion is based in Camden and was formed in 2016 as a merger of Affinity Sutton and Circle Housing Group.

== Clarion Housing Group ==
Clarion Housing Group comprises the Group's housing association and sole landlord, Clarion Housing, charitable foundation, Clarion Futures, and private development company, Latimer.

=== Clarion Housing ===
Clarion's single housing association Clarion Housing launched in January 2018. It is responsible for services to all of the Group's residents, replacing the 10 housing associations that previously existed.

Clarion experienced system issues in June 2022, as a result of a cyber attack, with tenants still experiencing problems when attempting to communicate with the housing association many weeks later. The phone system and email communications were impacted as a result of the attack.

=== Latimer ===
Latimer is Clarion Housing Group's private development company – delivering and marketing homes for private sale and leading on land acquisition. Revenues generated fund Clarion's affordable rent and sale programme.

=== Regulation ===
As a non-profit distributing housing association, Clarion is subject to the Regulator of Social Housing's regulatory regime. The Regulator of Social Housing sets standards that social landlords are expected to meet. The Regulator focuses on economic regulation and will expect landlords to meet expectations on governance, financial viability, rent setting and value for money.

== Affinity Sutton ==
Affinity Sutton was one of the largest providers of affordable housing in England managing over 58,000 homes and properties in over 120 local authorities. As a housing association, Affinity Sutton built and managed a range of homes for people with a variety of needs and budgets. As well as owning and managing properties, Affinity Sutton delivered a number of community focused services in the areas that they work. On 30 November 2016, Affinity Sutton merged with Circle Housing to form Clarion Housing Group and become the UK's largest housing association. They used the slogan "Helping people put down roots".

=== Rental and home ownership ===
Affinity Sutton's core purpose was to build and manage rental homes at sub-market rates for those who cannot afford to pay full market rates in the areas where they live. In addition, they also offered accommodation for key workers and those of retirement age and social rented accommodation. Other services they provided include supported housing which delivers extra care and support to vulnerable people and Rent 4 Less which is for working people, with prices at up to 80% of what might be paid in the private rental sector.

Affinity Sutton also provided a number of routes that aim to make home ownership more accessible. Shared ownership, also called part buy part rent, is designed for those that cannot afford to buy a home with a mortgage outright. In 2010, in partnership with Santander, Affinity Sutton launched a 95% mortgage deal for customers looking to buy their home through shared ownership. Affinity Sutton also offer an Equity loan to help towards home ownership.

To fund their social housing, Affinity Sutton developed a limited number of properties for open market sale – either in partnership with another developer or on their own account.

=== Funding ===
Affinity Sutton funded its activities through both private funding vehicles and Government grants. As a private, non-profit distributing housing association, it reinvests its surplus into building new homes and supporting the communities in which its residents live.

It borrowed £250 million through a bond issue in 2008, which at the time was the largest own-name bond issue by a housing association, and the first AA-rated bond from the sector. A second £250 million bond was issued in 2012 at the then lowest interest rate in the sector (4.25% for 30 years).

As the Great Recession reduced the viability of property developments, Affinity Sutton wrote off £13 million from asset values in its balance sheet in 2009, which was the largest impairment booked by a housing association to that date. Unlike smaller associations, it was able to bear the loss without requiring additional public grant.

Affinity Sutton won the second largest award of grant funding in the Homes and Communities Agency's 2011–15 programme, but in 2013 they stated that they were unlikely to deliver all of the 3,000 homes promised, because of difficulties in getting higher "affordable rents" agreed with local authorities.

=== Timeline ===
The history of Affinity Sutton can be traced back to 1900 when Victorian entrepreneur, William Richard Sutton bestowed his fortune to a charitable trust in his will to provide ‘model dwellings and houses for occupation by the poor of London and other towns and populous places in England’. This formed the Sutton Dwellings Trust.

In 1909, Sutton Dwellings Trust's first new homes were completed at the Bethnal Green Estate in East London and by 1925 the Trust had developed almost 2,000 homes across six sites, including the Chelsea Estate in South West London.

In 1939, at the outbreak of the Second World War, the Trust housed over 32,000 people.

In 1964, Downland was formed by a group of local businessmen in Sussex led by engineer, Archibald Shaw.

In 1990, Mid Sussex Housing Association was formed as one of the first Large Scale Voluntary Transfers when homes from Mid Sussex District Council were transferred from public ownership.

In 1992, Broomleigh was formed as the first urban Large Scale Voluntary Transfer of homes from the London Borough of Bromley.

In 1994, Ridgehill Housing Association was formed through the large scale voluntary transfer of Hertsmere Borough Council's homes.

In 1996, Downland Housing Society and Mid Sussex Housing Association came together to form the Downland Housing Group.

In 2000, Community Building Services was set up to deliver repairs and maintenance services to Ridgehill residents.

In 2001, Aashyana, the South West's first Asian led housing association, joined William Sutton Trust.

In 2004, Downland Retirement Management and Downland Property Management merged to form Grange Management Group. Downland Housing Group and The Affinity Homes Group then merged to become Downland Affinity and create one of the sector's largest groups.

In 2005, William Sutton and Ridgehill Boards agree to amalgamate and form a new association, called William Sutton Homes. Downland Affinity and William Sutton Homes then merged in 2006 to become one of the largest housing groups in the sector, Affinity Sutton.

In 2007, former MP Kerry Pollard was removed as Chair of William Sutton Homes, after he had complained about the behaviour of the new parent company in removing the association's chief executive.

In 2009, Affinity Sutton celebrated 100 years since their first housing project in Bethnal Green. In 2011, William Sutton Homes, Downland and Broomleigh amalgamated to form Affinity Sutton Homes.

In 2014, Aashyana transferred its engagements to Affinity Sutton Homes.

== Circle Housing ==
Circle Housing Group (or Circle) was one of the largest groups of housing associations in the UK. In 2016 it merged with Affinity Sutton and was renamed Clarion Housing Group, becoming the largest UK Housing Association and registered provider of social housing. Clarion provides affordable housing and related services in England, mainly in London, the South East, East Anglia and Birmingham.

The group was formed as Circle Anglia when Circle 33 Housing Group (founded in 1968 by architects David Bernstein and David Levitt) and Anglia Housing Group merged in 2005. Circle owns and manages more than 63,500 homes, including supported and sheltered housing, for more than 200,000 people across the UK, and employs over 2,200 staff.

The Circle Housing Group has 12 partners. Nine registered providers (RPs): South Anglia Housing, Wherry Housing Association, Old Ford Housing Association, Circle 33, Merton Priory Homes, Mole Valley Housing Association, Mercian Housing Association, Roddons Housing Association and Russet Homes; as well as Circle Living for sales and marketing and management of shared ownership, market rent and private sale properties. It has two care and support partners – Circle Support and INVICTA Telecare – one of the largest Telecare providers in England.

Circle belongs to two regional clubs of large associations: the G15 in London, and East Seven in East Anglia.

=== Funding ===
Housing associations borrow money to pay for new homes and improvements. During the 2008 financial crisis, banks were less able to provide all the credit that larger associations required, although Circle raised £1.7 billion in bank debt as the credit crunch developed. In November 2008, Circle Anglia raised £275 million on a 30-year corporate bond. This is the largest bond ever issued by a housing association in its own name. In November 2010, Circle was the first housing group to go to investors after the new government's comprehensive spending review, and raised £124m through a bond tap.

=== Members ===
The members of the group were:

Name	Established	Activity	Size
Circle 33 Housing Trust	1968	General needs housing	15,600 homes
Mole Valley Housing Association	2007	Housing management in Mole Valley following a stock transfer of Council housing in 2007	3,800 homes
Old Ford Housing Association	1998	Housing management in Old Ford as the successor to Tower Hamlets Housing Action Trust. Winner of the Housing Corporation's 2008 Gold Award for Building Cohesive Communities. Includes Orchard Village in Havering.	4,000 homes
Roddons Housing Association	2007	Stock transfer from Fenland District Council	
Russet Homes	1991	Stock transfer from Tonbridge and Malling	6,000 homes
South Anglia Housing		Merger of the former Stort Valley, Vange and Ryeland Housing Associations, which were all set up to handle stock transfers, as well as Blackwater, and Barking and Dagenham	6,400 homes
Wherry Housing Association	1990	Formed for stock transfer of 3,700 homes from Broadland. Now owns properties in Norfolk, Suffolk and Cambridgeshire	5,800 homes
Circle Support		Special needs care and support	Over 4,500 clients
Invicta Telecare		Telecare and housing support	Over 85,000 clients
Circle Living		Originally the 'Homes' division of Circle 33, it handles shared ownership, leasehold and maintenance services	

== Awards ==
=== As Affinity Sutton ===
- Sunday Times British Homes Awards – highly commended in the Housing Project category for The Square.
- NHF Affordable Home Ownership Awards- Highly Commended for Maple Quays, Canada Water
- Green Apple Award – Built Environment – Best Use of Mixed Development at Durand Close, Carshalton.
- Construction News Retrofit Project of the Year – Affinity Sutton's national retrofitting project, FutureFit, named Retrofit Project of the Year.
- SHIFT Award – supported by the Homes and Communities Agency, UK Green Building Council, WWF and the TSA – FutureFit, Affinity Sutton’s national retrofitting project, was praised as "outstanding research assisting the sector understand sustainability challenges."
- Winner Housing Association of the Year, 2011 – WhatHouse? Awards
- Big Tick Reaccreditation – Affinity Sutton retained its Big Tick status in 2012 for its work in Building Stronger Communities in the Business in the Community Awards for Excellence
- Sustainable Housing Awards 2012 – winner, Social housing provider of the year – Innovative approach to green homes award

== Criticism ==
- In the 2010 Inside Housing survey of Chief Executive salaries, Keith Exford, CEO of Affinity Sutton, was highlighted as receiving the highest bonus in the Social housing sector.
- The Homes and Communities Agency, which regulates social housing in England and Wales, ruled in early 2015 that Circle had breached the 'serious detriment' threshold for harm to consumers for its home repairs, due to "chronic and long standing difficulties in the delivery of the repairs service". Islington Borough Council had served a number of statutory notices on Circle after they had failed to repair homes in the Borough. The problems followed after Circle reduced its pool of contractors from 180 to six, in an attempt to save £100m over ten years. In April 2015, the regulator concluded that the failures stemmed from poor management of the risks, and ultimately, governance:

this exceptionally poor provision of repairs and maintenance has been made possible or contributed to by serious and enduring failures in, or in the operation of, Circle’s strategic planning and control framework such that Circle did not adequately manage or mitigate the strategic and operational risks inherent in the delivery of that service

- In 2021, Kwajo Tweneboa, a 22-year-old tenant of the Eastfields Estate in south London, started a social media campaign to force the group to carry out repairs, after waiting 18 months in a flat with no ceiling in the main room, mouldy walls, an infestation of vermin, water streaming through light fittings, and asbestos. David Orr, who chaired the Good Home Inquiry and also chairs Clarion Housing Association, said, "We have been publicly shamed by the quality of some of our homes. We took our eye off the ball. The homes are part of a major regeneration project, and because we've been focusing on the regeneration, we've been less concerned about the quality of the homes on a day-to-day basis."
- In May 2022 the Housing Ombudsman found the group guilty of "severe maladministration" in two separate cases, finding "serious problems with leaks, damp, mould and pest control" as well as complaints handling.
- In November 2022, Clarion received a regulatory downgrade from the Regulator of Social Housing. Clarion has had its Viability grading reduced from V1 to V2.
- In November 2023, reportage in The Guardian highlighted criticism of Clarion regarding the circumstances leading to a vulnerable tenant taking their own life. Despite repeated complaints regarding noise from neighbours and insufficient insulation, Clarion failed to address the issues which relatives argue contributed to Mark Pearce, aged 56, taking his own life in September 2021. Pearce's sister also informed the newspaper that Clarion had continued demanding rent four months after the death of her brother.

== See also ==
- Social housing
- Affordable housing
- Social landlord
- Housing association
- Elizabeth Balgobin
