= Civitas Social Housing =

British investment trust

Civitas Social Housing (LSE: CSH) is a large British investment trust dedicated to investments in existing portfolios of built social homes in England and Wales. Established in 2016, the company is listed on the London Stock Exchange. The Chairman is Michael Wrobel.

It is the largest social housing real estate investment trust, working with 15 housing associations. The Regulator of Social Housing has challenged the business model of some of its providers where rent income from housing benefit payments is less than lease expenditure.

In October 2021, the company promised proper disclosure about property transactions after criticism that it had failed to adequately disclose the fact that its fund managers were significant shareholders in companies from which the company had bought four property portfolios.

In July 2023, CK Asset Holdings confirmed that its wholly owned indirect subsidiary, Wellness Unity, would be acquiring the company at a price which valued it at approximately £485 million.
