= Network Homes =

- Formerly: Brent People's Housing Association; Stadium Housing; Network Stadium; Network Housing Association; Network Housing Group
- Industry: Social housing
- Founded: 1974; 52 years ago
- Defunct: 2023; 3 years ago
- Fate: merged with Sovereign to form SNG
- Successor: Sovereign Network Group
- Headquarters: England
- Owner: Sovereign Network Group (2023)
- Website: www.networkhomes.org.uk

Network Homes was a housing association operating in 36 local authorities across London, Hertfordshire, and the southeast of England. In 2019 the organisation owned and managed over 20,000 homes, making it one of London's largest housing associations.

In October 2023, the housing association merged its operations with its former rival Sovereign and formed the Sovereign Network Group (SNG), becoming the owner of 82,000 homes.

== History ==
Network Homes started life in 1974 as Brent People's Housing Association. The Association continued to develop throughout the 1970s and 1980s, and in 1988 was renamed Stadium Housing then Network Stadium and then Network Housing Association.

Growth then took a rapid upturn during the 1990s and 2000s as homes were transferred from local authorities, eventually resulting in the creation of a new structure, the Network Housing Group, in 2003.

In April 2016, the group was restructured again, bringing together all four main operating housing associations and the group parent together into a single organisation, Network Homes

== Mission ==
Network Homes state that they aim to "open up possibilities for as many people as we can, by continuing to grow a forward-thinking, service-driven and financially strong organisation that builds, sells, rents and manages good homes in thriving communities".

Aside from building and managing social housing, Network Homes pursues this goal through projects like their partnership with the New Horizon Youth Centre, which offers young homeless people safe, affordable accommodation together with support into sustainable employment and long-term housing

In July 2019, Network Homes Chief Executive Helen Evans was made Chair of the G15, a group of London's largest housing associations. She will hold the position until 2021, when Geeta Nanda OBE, Chief Executive of Metropolitan Thames Valley Housing, will assume the role.
