= Orchard Village =

Housing estate in South Hornchurch, London

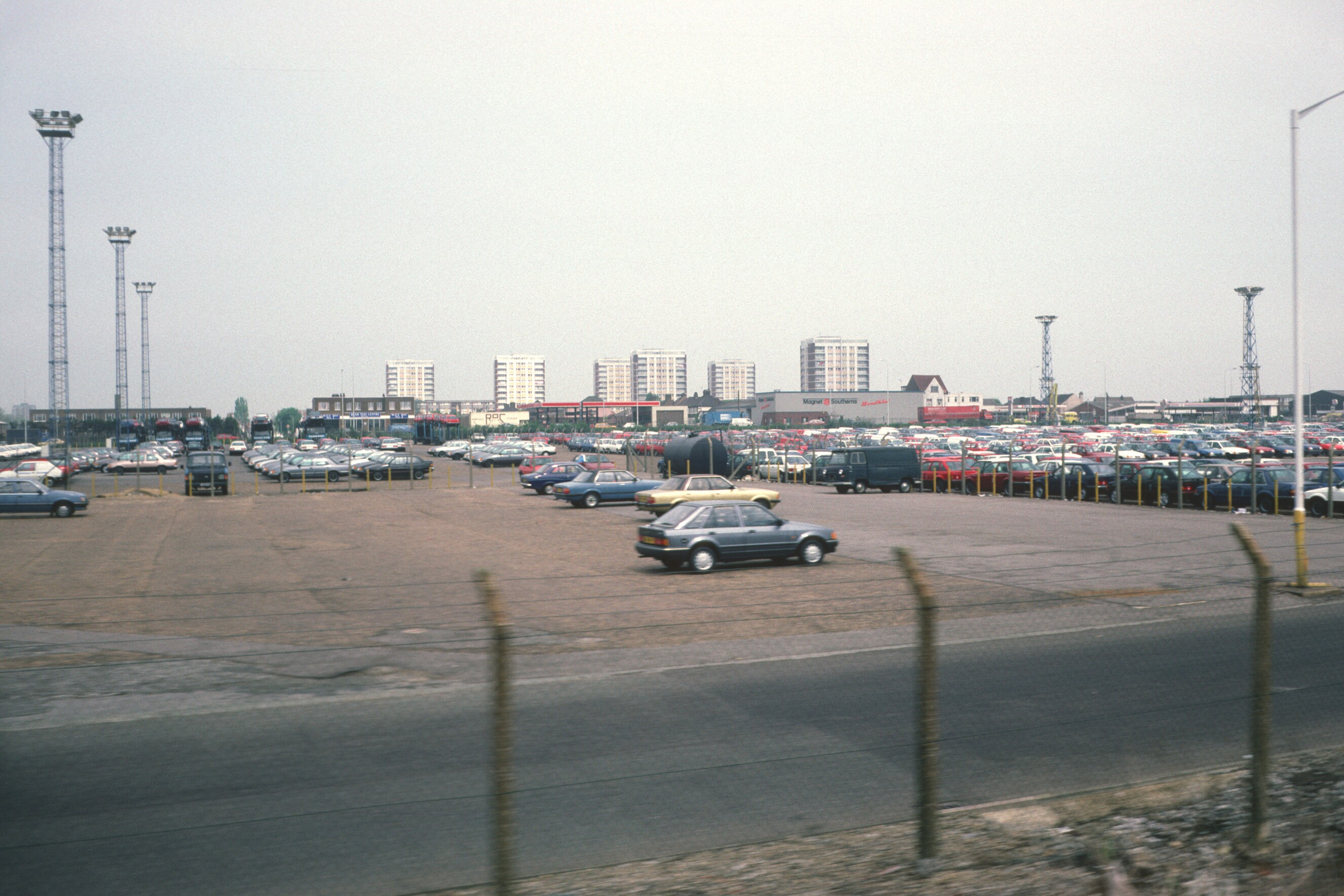
- Skyline of the former Mardyke Estate, 1988
- Interactive map of Orchard Village

General information
- Location: London, England
- Coordinates: 51.5292°N 0.1701°E
- Status: 555 new homes

Construction
- Constructed: 2009–2016

Other information
- Governing body: Circle Housing Old Ford

Orchard Village, on the site of the former Mardyke Estate, is a housing development in the South Hornchurch area of London, England. From 2009 to 2017 the site underwent regeneration as part of the London Riverside part of the Thames Gateway. Mardyke Estate was built by Hornchurch Urban District Council in the early 1960s. It was transferred from Havering London Borough Council to Old Ford Housing Association in March 2008 and redevelopment work started in November 2009. Most of the existing housing, including six high rise blocks and flats, were demolished.

== History ==
=== Mardyke Estate ===
The original estate was built by Wates Ltd for Hornchurch Urban District Council on land that was previously the Mardyke Farm. The Mardyke is a minor tributary of the River Thames in Thurrock. The 4.2 hectares (10 acres) site was built in the 1960s. It was on the A1306, close to the A13.

The estate included maisonettes, low-rise flats, and six high-rise buildings, each 38 m tall and consisting of 13 floors. They were named Chantry House, Dearsley House, Mardyke House, Perry House, Roman House and Templar House. There were 490 housing units for rent and 57 leasehold properties. The estate lacked private space and the juxtapositions of bedsits and maisonettes was not popular. In 2008, Havering Council transferred the estate to Old Ford Housing Association, part of the Circle Anglia Group.

=== Orchard Village development ===
Orchard Village is a development that created 555 new homes, comprising 339 general needs, 64 shared ownership and 152 private sale properties. There are also local shops and a new primary care facility. The architect was PRP Architects.

The proposal was passed by Havering Council to the Mayor of London's Office on 26 January 2009. It was considered and not refused, but comments were made that it did not comply with the London plan. In particular: London Plan policies on housing, children's playspace, urban design, access and equal opportunities, biodiversity, climate change mitigation and adaptation, transport and flood risk. The plan was revised, alterations made and resubmitted. The scheme of works included improvement to an open space adjacent to the estate. It was financed with £31.2m of public money in the form of a grant from the Homes and Communities Agency and administered by the Office of the Mayor Of London (GLA).

Work commenced in November 2009. The scheme was built in three phases. Phase 1 and Phase 2 were mainly social housing, let to the displaced tenants from the original Mardyke Estate. The builder, Willmott Dixon, claimed “the successful completion of phases one and two” and that phase two “was declared best social or affordable new housing development of the year in the Local Authority Building Control Excellence awards”.

Phase 3 was a development of shared ownership affordable properties. There are 87 units (homes): 29 for affordable rent, 28 shared ownership and 30 for sale. The builder was again Wilmott Dixon.

The name Orchard Village reflects the previous use of part of the land as an orchard supplying fruit to Wilkin & Sons.

=== Construction issues ===
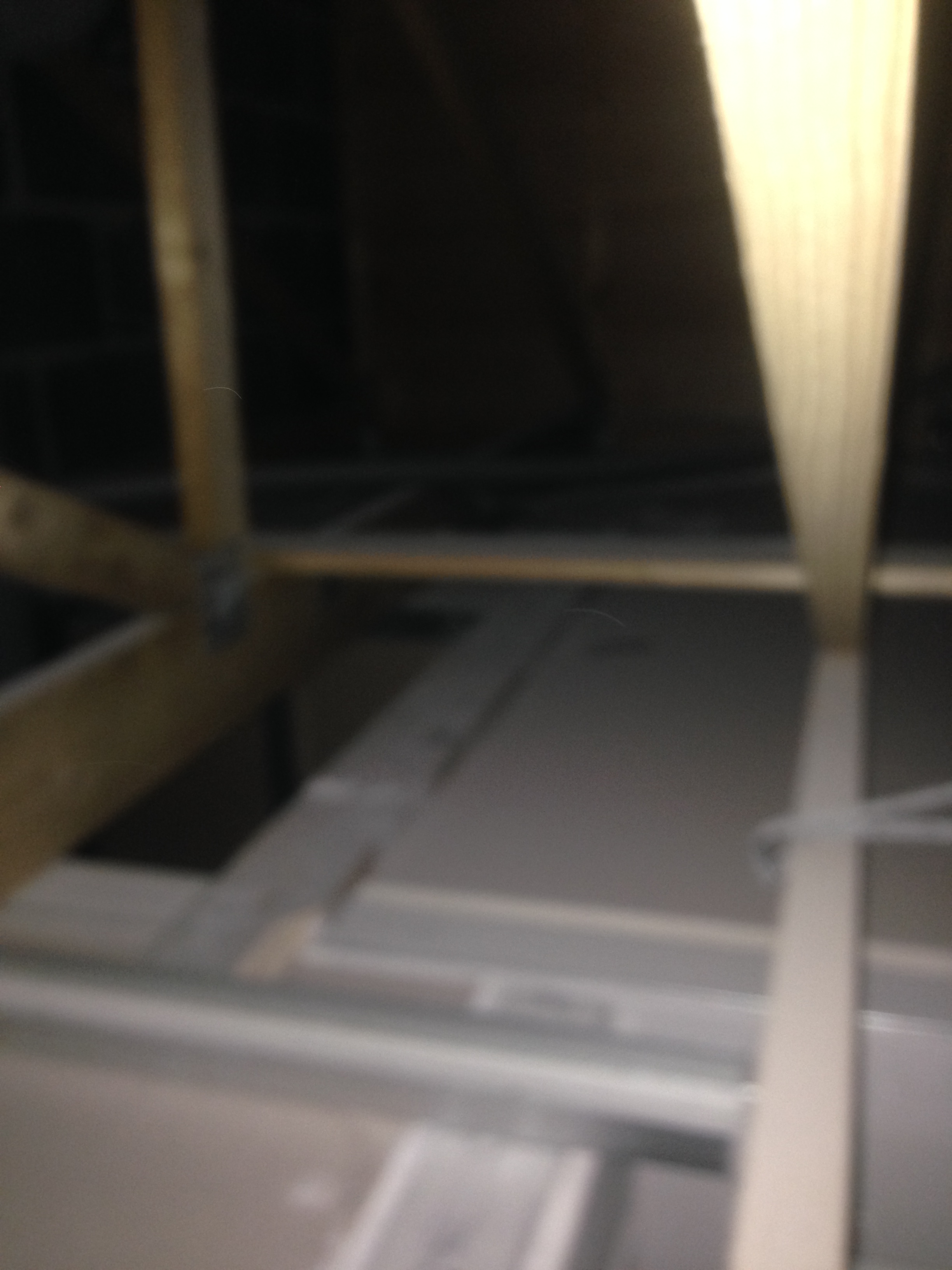
One of the dozens of homes in Orchard Village supplied without insulation.

Since its construction, Orchard Village has been beset with problems of build quality and estate management. From late 2015 onwards, residents who purchased homes from Circle Housing, as either freeholders or shared ownership leaseholders, complained of build quality issues including continual leaks, thermal discomfort, electrical faults and high energy bills.

In early 2016, residents discovered that homes were not insulated and began a process to complain to the authorities involved, Havering Building Control, Circle Housing, the Homes and Communities Agency (HCA) and the Greater London Authority (GLA). The energy performance certificates bore no relation to the energy bills from a "locked in" supplier. On average, home owners are experiencing 3-5 more in costs to the EPCs. Many of the residents were awaiting insulation to be installed into their homes. Gardens were not draining, killing the grass. There was back-flowing of raw sewage into the shower trays and the kitchens. There was stench from hydrogen sulphide and dangerously high levels of methane, gases that cause migraine and respiratory diseases. It was proposed that these were leaking from the nearby landfill site.

Residents were angered by the HCA and GLA's refusal to examine evidence of resident's exposure to category 1 hazards such as mould and damp, leaving vulnerable individuals, such as disabled children, hospitalised. Residents criticised Circle's poor management, citing long delays in repairs.

== Transport ==
The estate is not served by any Tube lines, with Dagenham Heathway being the nearest tube station, and Dagenham Dock being the nearest railway station. The 365 bus route had numerous stops within the estate. Orchard Village is served by London Buses route 365.

== Media ==
The former estate was the setting of the 2009 film Fish Tank. The domestic shots in the 2010 film Made in Dagenham were taken on the estate, and the demolition of the tower blocks was postponed to facilitate filming.
