= Edward Thomas Wakefield =

British barrister and landowner (1821–1896)

Edward Thomas Wakefield (1821–1896) was a British barrister, and landowner in Ireland.

== Life ==
Wakefield was born in Leeson Street, Dublin in 1821. He obtained his B.A. from Trinity College, Dublin on 16 May 1846, and moved to London to practise as a barrister.

The first mention of estates in Ireland was on 12 June 1884 when he was in dispute with his tenants over peat rights. The tenants of his Lurgan estate described him as an absentee landlord. The estate included Portadown House.

Wakefield died at Margate on 21 June 1896.

== Wakefield v Buccleuch ==
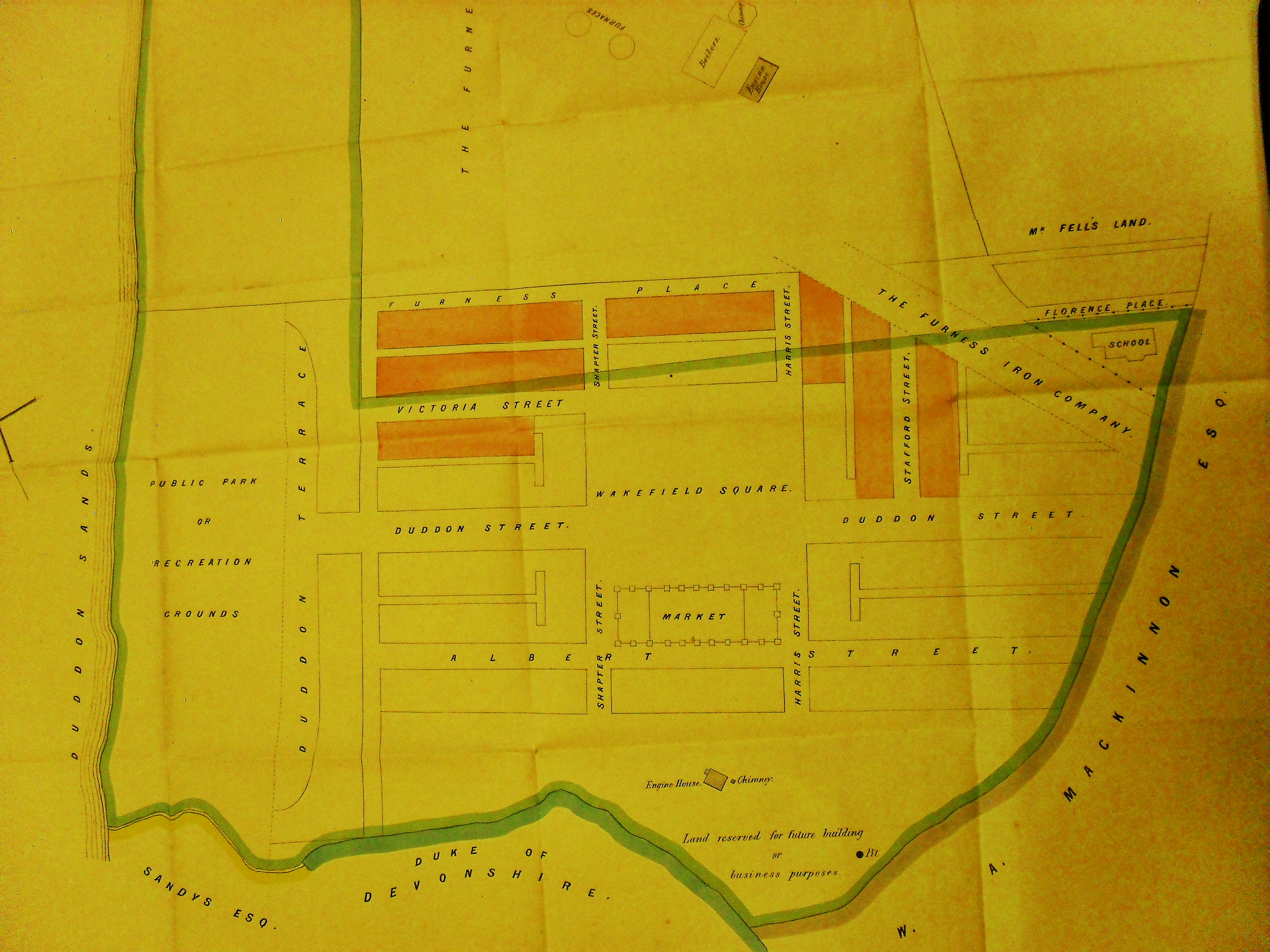
E T Wakefield's plan for his land at Askam. Houses shaded red were sold before the case. From evidence in Wakefield v Buccleuch, BDBUC 47/3 at CRO, Barrow

In 1865 E. T. Wakefield bought Chapman's Lot, Askam near Barrow-in-Furness, Lancashire, from Thomas Sharpe. The intention was to build an ironworks for the Furness Iron and Steel Co, in which he was a partner, and also a housing estate on his own account. There was an iron mine working here on a lease from the Duke of Buccleuch. When the inevitable subsidence became apparent, Wakefield sought to establish:

- a, that the duke was not entitled to ore under his land and
- b, that the duke was not entitled to cause surface damage on his land.

Wakefield won his case in 1867 but the verdict was overturned in the House of Lords in 1870.

== Wife and children ==
On 7 October 1863, Wakefield married Florence Wharton at the British embassy in Munich.

== Other interests ==
In 1846 Wakefield presented a petition on behalf of the Aborigines' Protection Society and in 1856 became a trustee of the National Savings Bank. In 1857 he addressed the National Association for the Promotion of Social Science on the amendment of law on transfer of land, in September 1858 he addressed the Kendal Scientific Institute on "Poetry as a means of education considered principally in relation to the working classes" and in 1862 he addressed the Literary and Scientific Institute on "The American war, its causes and consequences".

In 1859 he became secretary for the Metropolitan Free Drinking Fountain Association and produced the design for their first fountain. His book on the subject is still in print.

In May 1862 he became a trustee of the National Association of British Miners.

He became a minister of the United Methodist Free Churches in August 1883 and was a member of the Primitive Methodist church society.
