= Metropolitan Drinking Fountain and Cattle Trough Association =

19th century charity in London, England

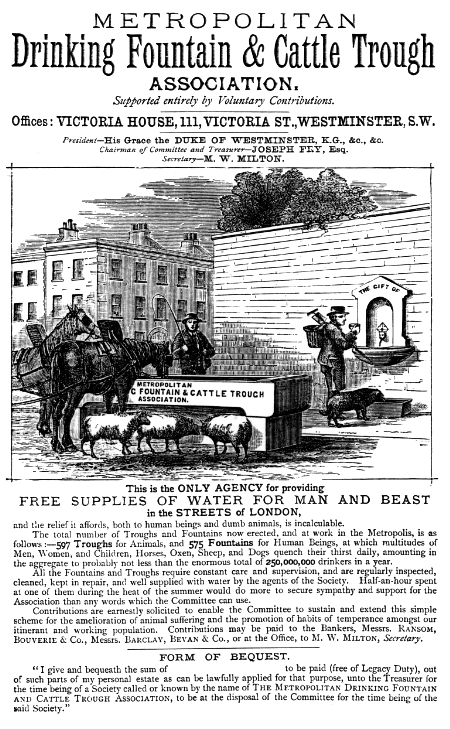
An advertisement from Burke's Peerage, 1879.

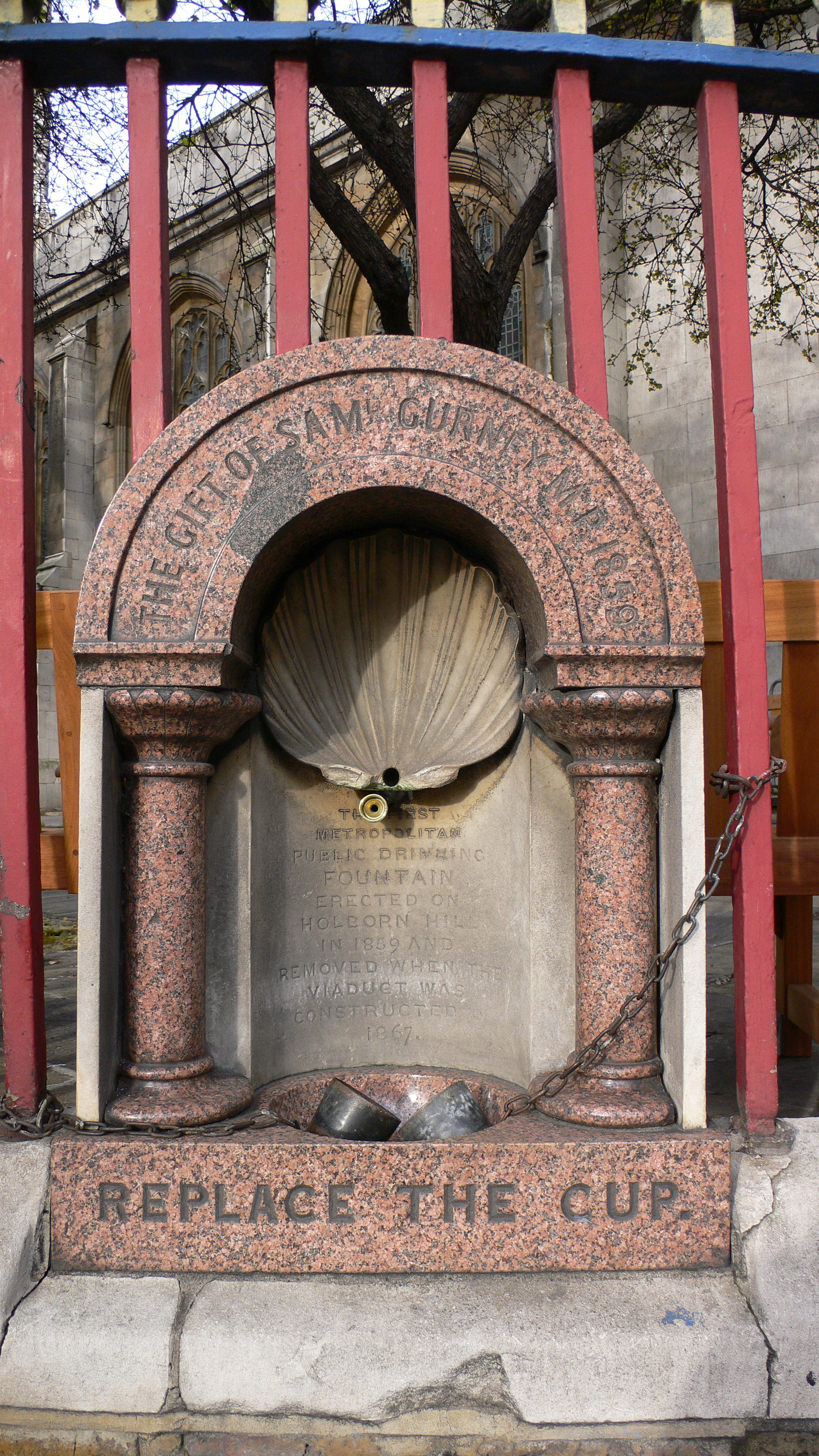
First drinking fountain installed by the Metropolitan Drinking Fountain and Cattle Trough Association

The Metropolitan Drinking Fountain and Cattle Trough Association was set up in London by Samuel Gurney, a member of Parliament and philanthropist, and Edward Thomas Wakefield, a barrister, to provide free drinking water in 1859.

Originally called the Metropolitan Free Drinking Fountain Association it changed its name to include cattle troughs in 1867, to also support animal welfare. In 2011, as the Drinking Fountain Association, it began to support the Find-a-Fountain campaign to map the UK's drinking water fountains.

== Background ==
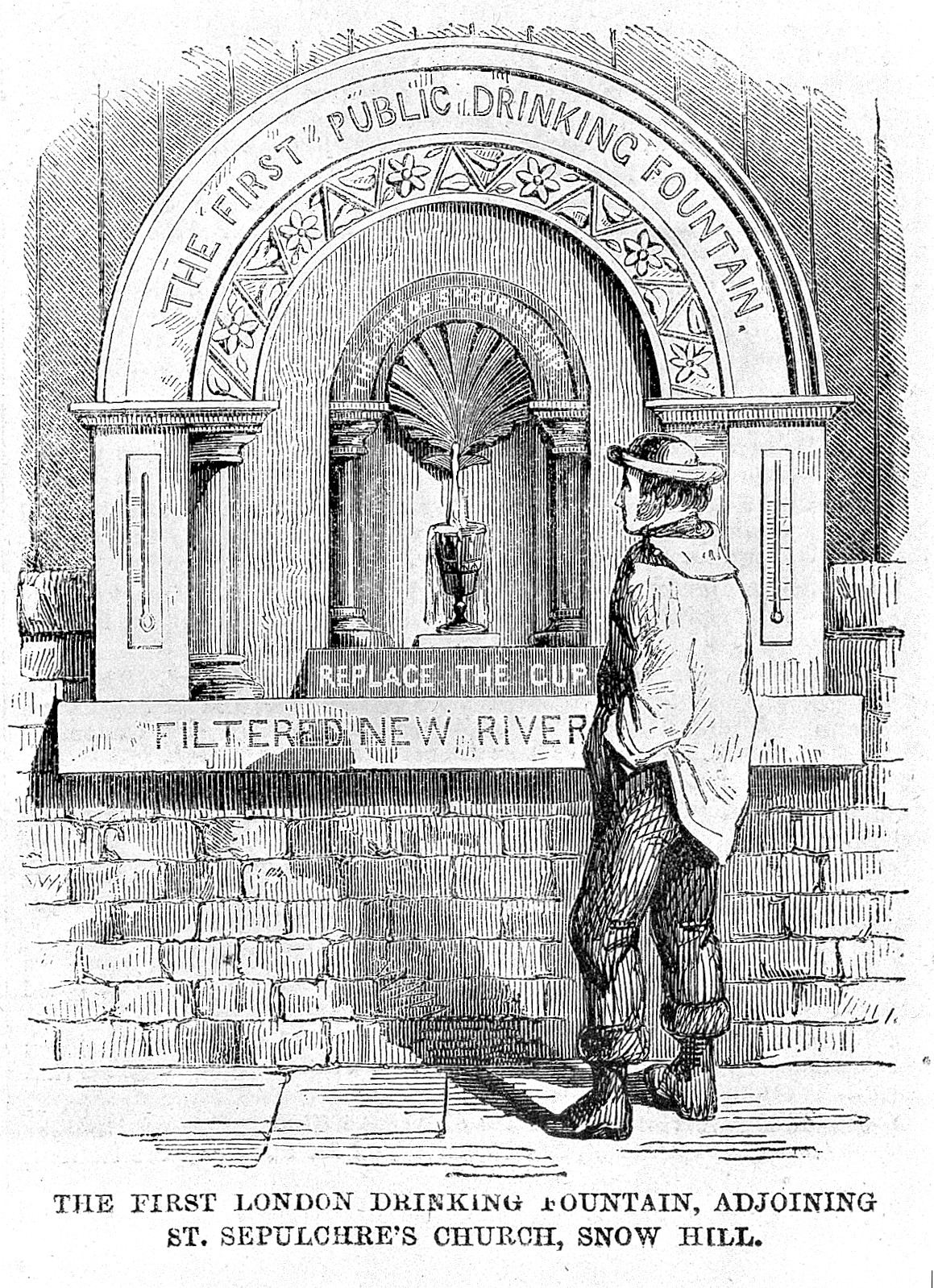
The first drinking fountain in London, in the churchyard of St Sepulchre-without-Newgate.

Water provision in the nineteenth century was from nine private water companies each with a geographic monopoly, which provided inadequate quantities of water which was often contaminated, as was famously discovered by John Snow during the 1854 cholera epidemic. Population growth in London had been very rapid (more than doubling between 1800 and 1850) without an increase in infrastructure investment. Legislation in the mid nineteenth century gradually improved the situation. The Metropolitan Commission of Sewers was formed, water filtration was made compulsory, and water intakes on the Thames were forced to be moved above the sewage outlets.

In this environment the public drinking fountain movement began, initially in Liverpool where the local government was granted the ability to buy out the private water companies in 1847. It built the first public baths and then encouraged philanthropic public drinking water fountains. This was taken up by Samuel Gurney.

== Early history ==
The Society was inaugurated in 1859 with the requirement "That no fountain be erected or promoted by the Association which shall not be so constructed as to ensure by filters, or other suitable means, the perfect purity and coldness of the water." The first fountain was built on Holborn Hill on the railings of the church of St Sepulchre-without-Newgate on Snow Hill, paid for by Samuel Gurney, and opened on 21 April 1859. It was moved in 1867 when the Holborn Viaduct was built but reinstated in 1913 where it remains.

The fountain became immediately popular, used by 7000 people a day. In the next six years 85 fountains were built, but much of the funding came directly from the association; much of that money was provided directly by Samuel Gurney, as donations were not sufficient.

Gradually the association became more widely accepted, benefiting from its association with Evangelical Christianity and the Temperance movement. Many were known as temperance fountains. Beer was the main alternative to water, and generally safer. The temperance societies had no real alternative as tea and coffee were too expensive, so drinking fountains were very attractive. Many were sited opposite public houses.

The evangelical movement was encouraged to build fountains in churchyards to encourage the poor to see churches as supporting them. Many fountains have inscriptions such as "Jesus said whosoever drinketh of this water shall thirst again but whosoever drinketh of the water I shall give him shall never thirst". By 1877, the association was widely accepted and Queen Victoria donated money for a fountain in Esher.

Charles Dickens, Jr.'s Dickens's Dictionary of London said in 1879, under "Drinking Fountains":

Until the last few years London was ill-provided with public drinking fountains and cattle troughs. This matter is now well looked after by the Metropolitan Drinking Fountain and Cattle Trough Association, which has erected and is now maintaining nearly 800 fountains and troughs, at which an enormous quantity of water is consumed daily. It is estimated that 300,000 people take advantage of the fountains on a summer’s day, and a single trough has supplied the wants of 1,800 horses in one period of 24 hours. Several ornamental fountains have been provided by private munificence. Amongst these may be instanced the Baroness Burdett Coutts’s beautiful fountains in Victoria-park and Regent’s-park the Maharajah of Vizianagram’s in Hyde-park; Mrs. Brown’s, by Thornycroft, in Hamilton-place, Mr. Wheeler’s at the north of Kew-bridge; and Mr. Buxton’s at Westminster.

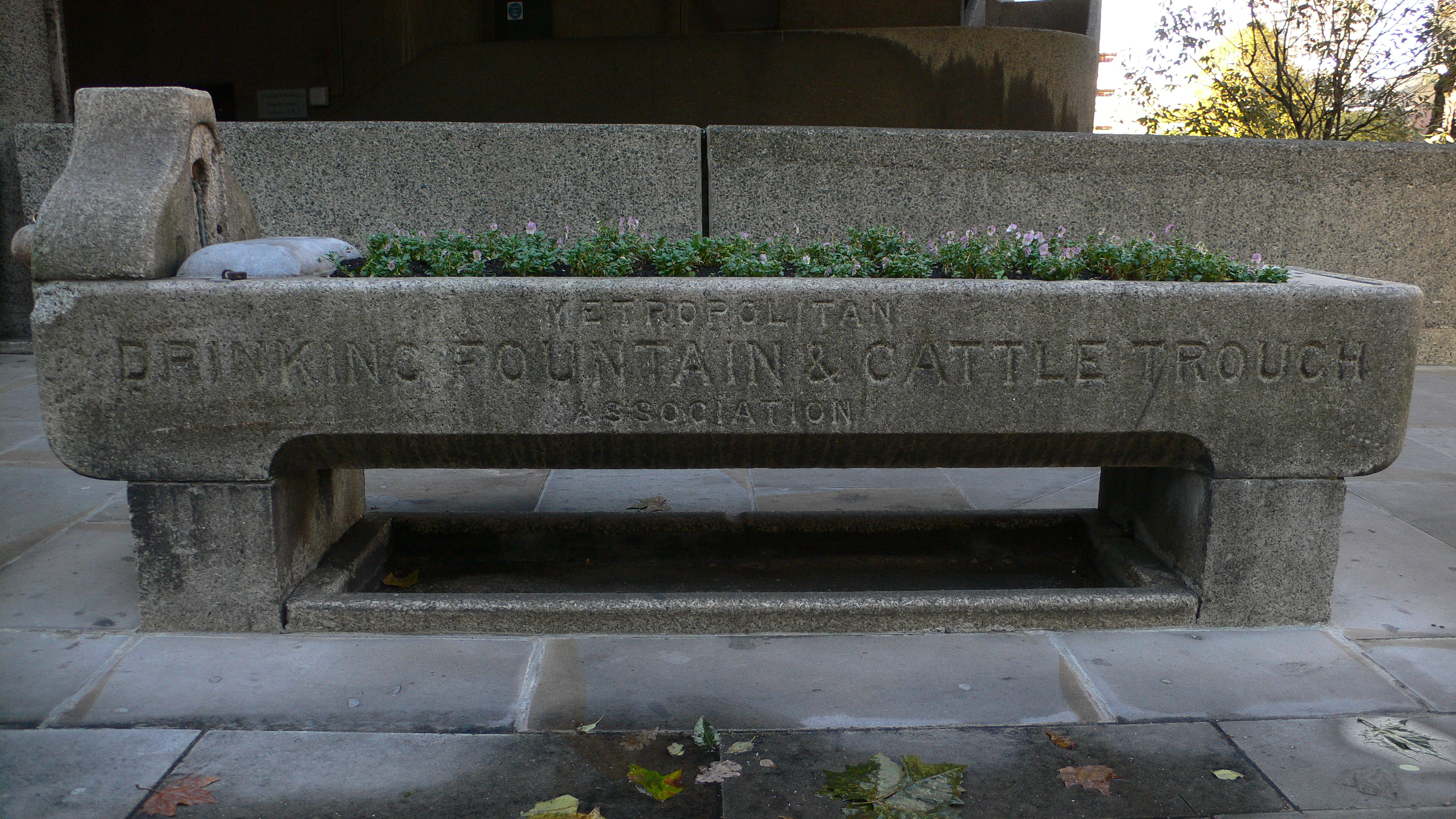
A cattle trough on London Wall.

In collaboration with the Royal Society for the Prevention of Cruelty to Animals, troughs were built for horses, cattle and dogs. Live cattle were still brought to market (at Smithfield and the Metropolitan Cattle Market); horses were vital for transport. Previously troughs were provided for patrons of public houses or for a charge (one example was inscribed All that water their horses here Must pay a penny or have some beer), and free ones made a huge difference; Hansom cabs travelled with maps showing the new free troughs, and they have been described as Victorian filling stations.

The surviving cattle troughs are mainly large granite ones, in many cases planted with flowers. Earlier designs were of cast iron or zinc lined timber, but both were too easily damaged.

== Twentieth century ==
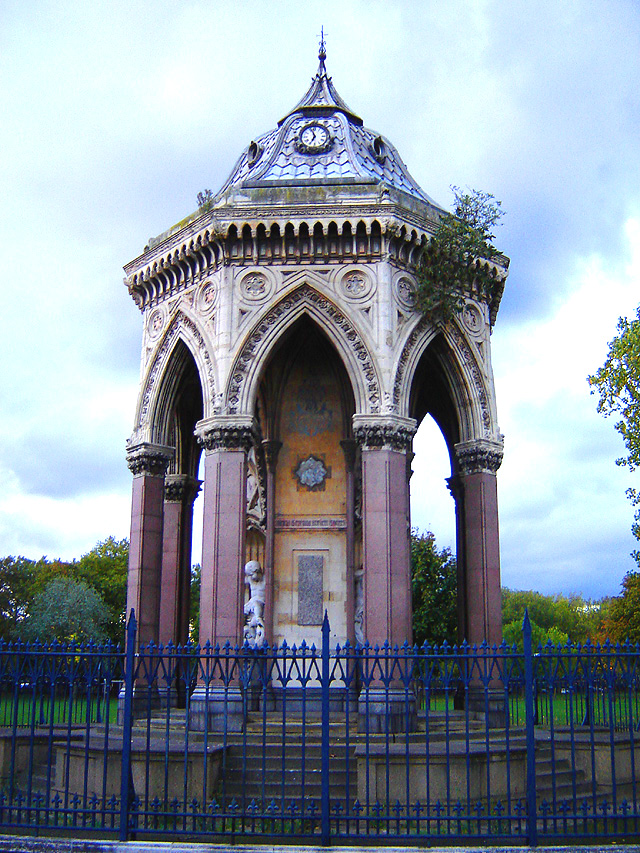
The Baroness Burdett Coutts Drinking Fountain, Victoria Park, Tower Hamlets, London.

Gradually the association became less radical. Having originally been one of the manifestations of Victorian private philanthropy recognising the limitations of the free market it became less important as local government began to provide more public services, and evangelical Nonconformism declined in importance.

Wealthy patrons began to commission more elaborate fountains, designed by well known architects, as well as the simple granite standard patterns. The most elaborate were those built in 1862 by Angela Burdett-Coutts in Victoria Park which cost over £6000, and the Buxton Memorial Fountain commemorating the emancipation of slaves.

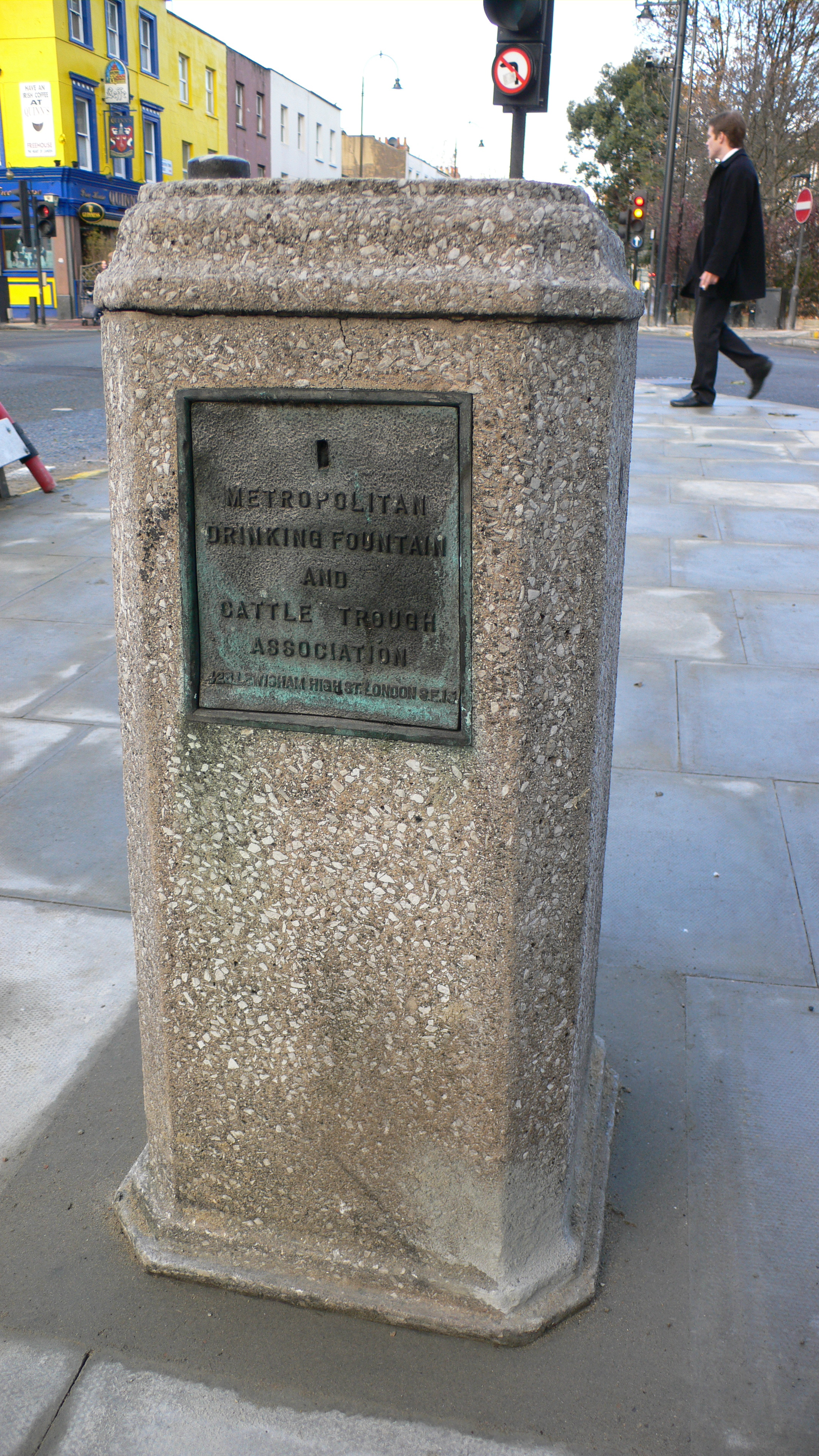
A 1929 standard model.

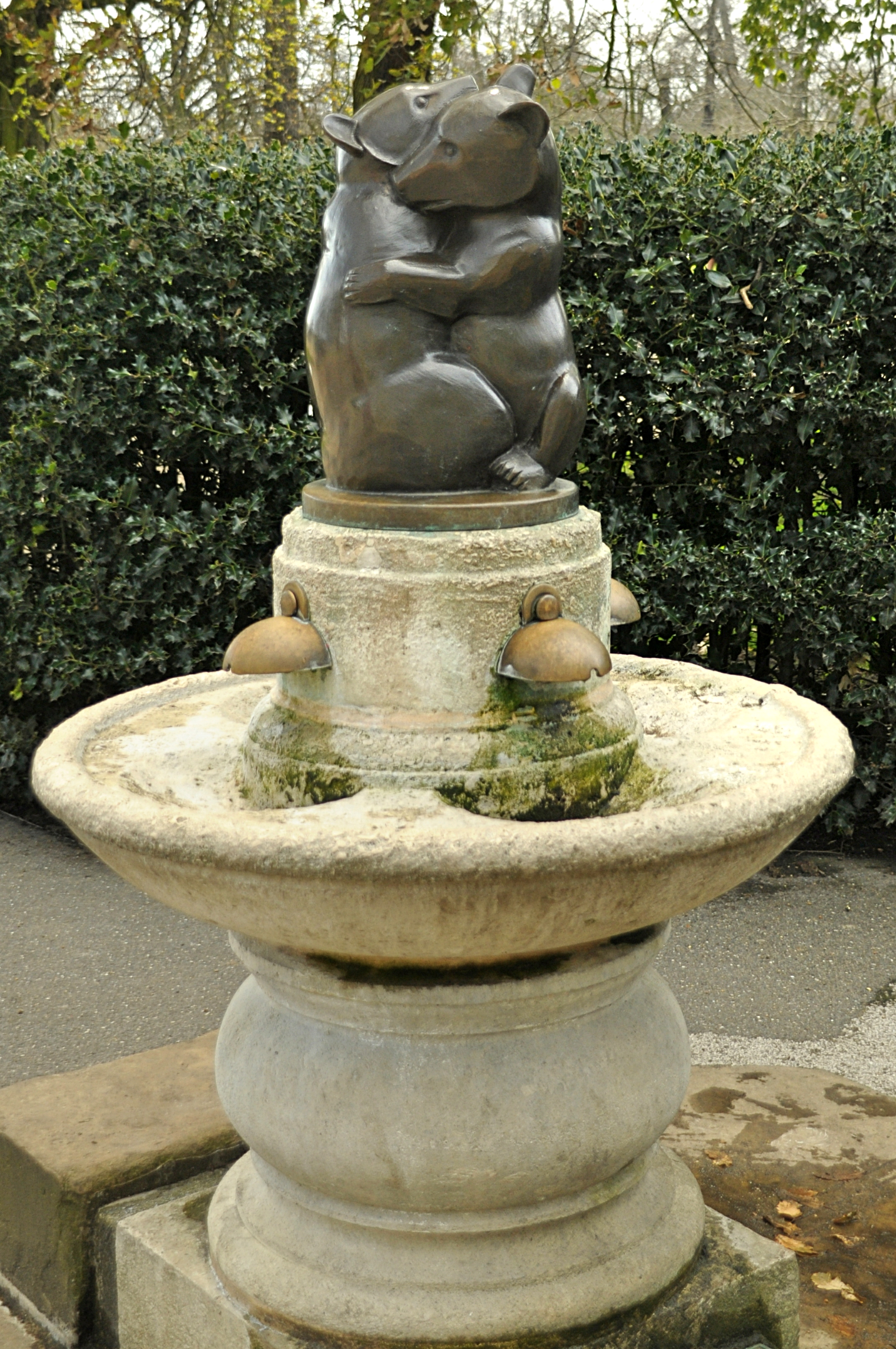
Two Bears Drinking fountain, Kensington Gardens, London, placed in 1939 to commemorate 80 years of the Metropolitan Drinking Fountain and Cattle Trough Association.

By 1936, the association stopped building troughs, as cars and lorries were gradually replacing the horse. More drinking fountains were provided in schools and parks, and the old cups were replaced by jets of water as these were seen as more hygienic. The 1929 small standard design of fountain for parks and schools is still common.

The association survives as the Drinking Fountain Association and received a National Lottery grant to build more fountains in 2000, and to restore existing ones. It now builds drinking fountains in schools, restores existing fountains and provides wells and other water projects in developing countries.

== See also ==
- Bills horse troughs, a similar organisation in Australia
- Wallace fountains, public drinking fountains in Paris
- Animal welfare in the United Kingdom
