= L&Q =

British housing association

- Founded: 1963
- Founder: Rev Nicolas Stacey
- Type: Housing association
- Location: London
- Region served: London, South East England, East Anglia, North West England
- Product: Homes to buy, affordable and social-rented homes, supported and sheltered housing
- Key people: Aubrey Adams OBE (Chairman); Fiona Fletcher-Smith (CEO); Waqar Ahmed (Finance)
- Subsidiaries: Quadrant Construction Services Ltd, L&Q Living and Trafford Housing Trust
- Employees: 2800+ (2021)
- Website: lqgroup.org.uk

L&Q (London & Quadrant Housing Trust) is a housing association operating in Greater London, the South East, East Anglia, and parts of the North West (under its subsidiary company Trafford Housing Trust). L&Q's registered office is based in Stratford. Quadrant Housing Association, one of its original forebears, was established in 1963. L&Q is one of the largest housing associations in England. As of 2021, the company owns/manages in excess of 120,000 homes, housing c250,000 residents. It has faced significant criticism in recent years for service failures, including poor maintenance, prolonged disrepair, and handling of complaints. A 2023 Housing Ombudsman report found “severe maladministration,” and the organisation was criticised for sharp increases in service charges, which in some cases rose by over 40%. These issues have led to parliamentary scrutiny and public rebukes from government ministers.

== History ==
The Quadrant Housing Association was founded by Rev Nicolas Stacey, a Church of England priest who later became head of Social Services for Kent County Council, and Gospatric Home, a former British Army Major and entrepreneur.

Home chaired the 1958 Club, a dinner society of young bachelors working in the City of London. He invited Rev. Stacey to give a talk on homelessness to the club. This inspired the pair to form a committee to take action, which raising an initial £64 from 32 shares bought by each of the Club members for £2. This sum was used to found Quadrant Housing Association, with Rev. Stacey as Chief Executive, and Home as Chairman. The new housing association bought its first property, 2 Wrottesley Road, for £3,500 and invited a Mrs Cobb to move in. Because they employed so few staff, in Home and Rev. Stacey had to find and interview potential social housing tenants themselves.

In 1973 Quadrant joined forces with another association, London Housing Trust, which had been set up in 1967. The merged organisation was named London & Quadrant Housing Trust.

In 2011, London and Quadrant was criticised by Conservative Party politicians alleging that L&Q had misled the public and MPs over its plans for development on the site of the Walthamstow Stadium.

In December 2016, London and Quadrant merged with the East Thames Housing Group.

In February 2017, L&Q completed a deal to buy the private land company Gallagher Estates for £505 million from Tony Gallagher.

An independent review conducted by Campbell Tickell in 2018 revealed maintenance of some of the company's properties had fallen below standards.

The Times reported in 2019 the company owned 95,000 homes across London and the south-east.

In 2019, L&Q acquired Trafford Housing Trust.

In 2021, Fiona Fletcher-Smith was appointed Group CEO, replacing David Montague CBE.

=== Quadrant Construction ===
In 2010, L&Q created an in-house construction practice, Quadrant Construction, which grew by 2016 to a £200m turnover business, making a £4m profit that was given back to the housing association. However, on 23 May 2017, L&Q announced a restructuring which would see Quadrant rebranded, with consultations starting about possible redundancies among the 200-strong workforce.

== Controversies ==
=== Service charges ===
L&Q has faced criticism over significant increases in service charges for shared‑ownership and leasehold residents. Reports indicate charges rose by 41% in one year—without clear justification—and in some cases payments equalled more than half of household income. The Housing Ombudsman upheld over 86% of complaints against L&Q in this area.

=== Maintenance and property condition ===
In April 2025, residents of a Sidcup block managed by L&Q experienced a **12‑day water cut** due to delays in fixing a supply pipe, with inadequate communication and support, negatively affecting elderly and disabled tenants.

=== Ombudsman findings and handling of complaints ===
A 2023 investigation by the Housing Ombudsman found evidence of “constant maladministration,” including tying compensation to confidentiality agreements and failing to comply with complaint‑handling regulations.

=== Mutual exchange and rehousing issues ===
Reports emerged in April 2024 of residents moved via L&Q’s mutual exchange scheme into unsafe homes contaminated with asbestos, structural defects, and exposed wiring. A separate case in February 2023 described a terminally ill mother living in temporary hotel accommodation for 15 months while repairs were delayed.

=== Discrimination and staff conduct ===
In 2020, L&Q was ordered to pay £31,000 after a tribunal found it failed to address racial harassment by neighbours adequately. In 2023, a staff member was terminated for posting “extremely racist and offensive comments” on social media.

=== Treatment of disabled tenants ===
In 2025, the United Nations Special Rapporteur on the right to adequate housing made public a letter sent to L&Q management detailing their systematic failure to provide adequate housing, citing the case of a family of five who live in a one bedroom property owned by L&Q, who "experienced four ceiling collapses, as well as severe damp and mould that affected their health". This letter was featured in a number of media outlets
