= Hyde Group =

- Founded: 1967
- Type: Housing association and property services group
- Headquarters: London
- Region served: United Kingdom
- Chair: Mike Kirk
- Group Chief Executive Officer: Andy Hulme
- Chief Financial Officer: Sharon Pearce
- Revenue: £992.3 million (year ending 31 March 2026)
- Employees: 5,500 (2025/26)

Hyde Group is a British housing association and property services group based in London. Hyde Housing Association, its principal regulated landlord, is a member of the G15. As of 2025/26, the group owned or managed approximately 130,000 homes and provided neighbourhood services to around 350,000 households in more than 300 local authority areas across the United Kingdom.

The group includes Hyde Housing, Pinnacle Group, a national provider of housing and neighbourhood management services, and Pinnacle Investments, a residential investment manager. Its activities include building and managing affordable housing, providing property and neighbourhood services and managing homes for public bodies and private-sector clients.

== History ==
Hyde Housing Association was established in 1967 following discussions among a group of local people in Sidcup who wanted to provide affordable housing for people excluded from the mainstream market.

Its major regeneration projects have included the redevelopment of the Packington estate in Islington.

== Sustainability ==
Hyde is a member of the Greener Futures Partnership, established with Abri, Anchor Hanover, Home Group and Sanctuary. The housing associations work together on energy efficiency and decarbonisation initiatives across a combined portfolio of around 300,000 homes.

Hyde has stated an aim for all new homes it builds to achieve a minimum Energy Performance Certificate (EPC) high Band B rating by 2027 and Band A by 2030. It has also stated a target for its existing homes to reach at least EPC Band C by 2030.

== Recent developments ==
In October 2024, Hyde acquired Pinnacle Group, a provider of housing, neighbourhood and workplace management services. Pinnacle continued to operate as a subsidiary of Hyde. Tower Hamlets Community Housing (THCH) became part of the group in April 2025. Arhag Housing Association, which managed approximately 1,000 homes in London, joined in April 2026 and transferred its homes and services to Hyde in July 2026.

For the financial year ending 31 March 2026, Hyde reported group revenue of £992.3 million and group turnover of £634.9 million, with adjusted group EBITDA of £152.7 million and an operating surplus of £70.6 million. During the year, it completed 1,142 homes, including 984 affordable homes, and began construction on a further 666. Reported overall customer satisfaction was 83.5%.

Pinnacle Group contributed £214 million to group turnover in 2025/26. Hyde reported a development pipeline of 5,000 homes scheduled for completion between 2025 and 2029.

In October 2025, Fitch Ratings rated Hyde A with a stable outlook. In November 2025, S&P Global Ratings affirmed the group's A− credit rating and changed its outlook from negative to stable.

At the 2025 First Time Buyer Readers' Awards, Hyde New Homes received three awards, including Best First Time Buyer Apartment for a development at Kingston Wharf in Shoreham-by-Sea, and was highly commended as Affordable Housing Provider of the Year. Hyde was also reaccredited as an Investors in People Gold organisation in November 2025.

In November 2025, Hyde published the 2024/25 edition of its Value of a Social Tenancy research in partnership with Sonnet Advisory & Impact. The report estimated that approximately 160,000 social tenancies owned or managed by Hyde and four other housing associations generated at least £4.8 billion in social value in 2024/25.

In March 2026, the Regulator of Social Housing awarded Hyde a C1 consumer grade and confirmed its existing G1 governance and V2 financial viability grades.

Also in March 2026, Hyde and Legal & General formed a 50:50 investment partnership to acquire and manage affordable housing, initially involving a portfolio of more than 1,000 homes across social rent and shared ownership. The homes were to be held by two for-profit registered providers jointly owned by the partners.

In the same financial year, M&G acquired 211 shared ownership homes from Hyde, with housing management services continuing to be provided by the Hyde Group.

In April 2026, Hyde appointed Sharon Pearce as chief financial officer, a newly created role. Pearce had worked at Hyde for 19 years, most recently as commercial director and previously as financial director.

Hyde New Homes received a Gold Award for customer satisfaction for the thirteenth consecutive year in April 2026. According to the survey published by Hyde, 98.7% of its shared ownership buyers said they would recommend it to others, with a reported Net Promoter Score of 71.9.

== Community investment ==
Hyde funded a multi-million-pound refurbishment of the Old Laundry community centre in Stockwell, south London, which reopened in August 2023.

In 2025/26, the Hyde Charitable Trust awarded £0.97 million in grants to support residents and community organisations, including projects addressing basic household needs, homelessness prevention and employment.

In 2026, Hyde extended its school uniform voucher programme to secondary-school pupils. Eligible households were offered a £50 voucher per child from reception to Year 11, redeemable with clothing supplier Trutex.

Hyde and Pinnacle Group also ran a 'Summer of Football' project in 2026, distributing footballs to community organisations, schools and local groups.
