= Sanctuary Housing =

Housing association in Worcester, England

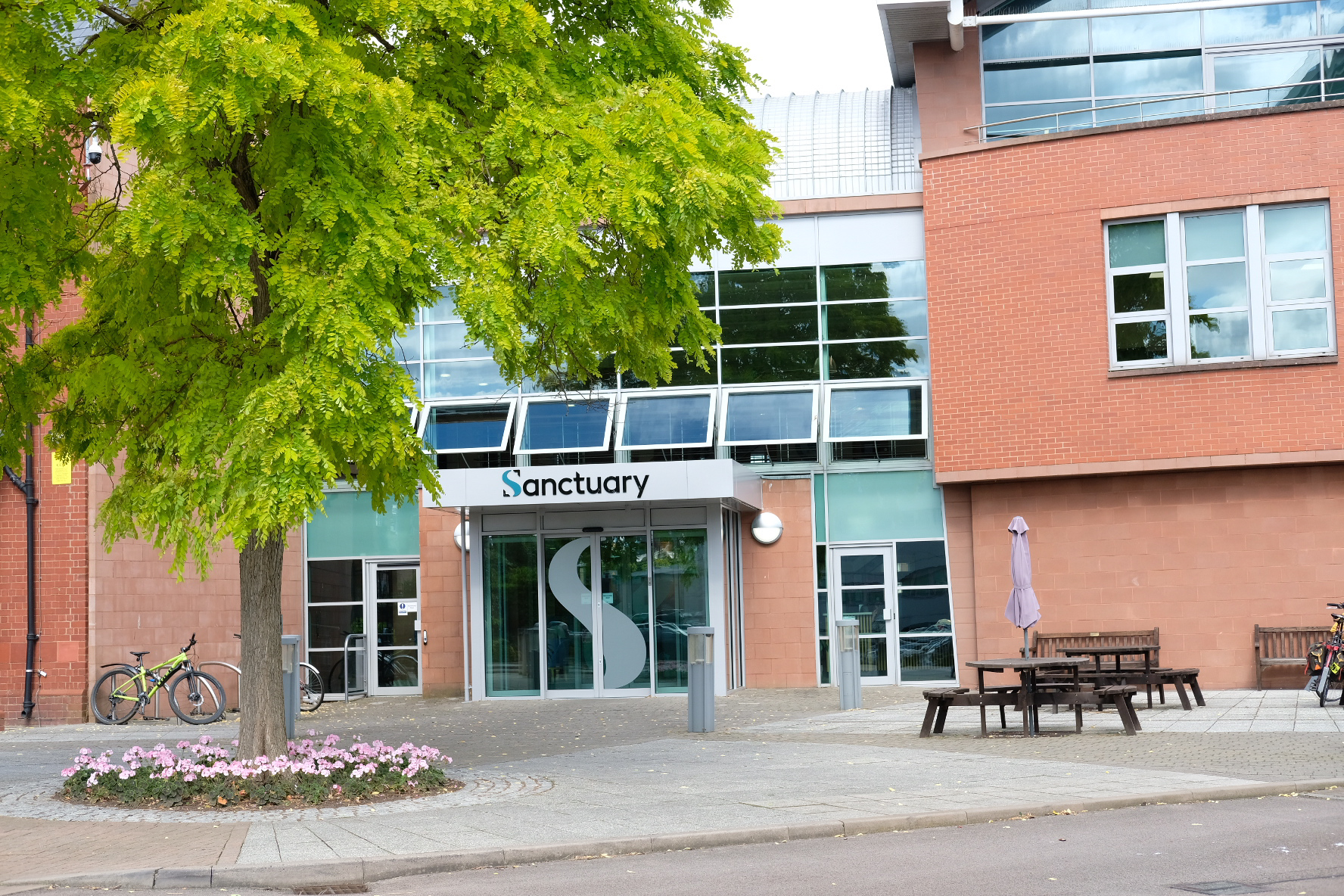
- Sanctuary Housing's Worcester Office, seen in August 2023
- Type: Housing association
- Headquarters: Worcester, England
- Field: Housing
- Parent organization: Sanctuary Group
- Website: www.sanctuary.co.uk

Sanctuary Housing is a large housing association based in Worcester, England. It is part of the Sanctuary Group, which also includes other organisations such as Sanctuary Care (running more than 100 care homes), Sanctuary Students (accommodation), Sanctuary Supported Living, Sanctuary Scotland (social housing) and Sanctuary Homes (development).

== History ==
Sanctuary was established as a charitable organisation in July 1969, originally named "World of Property Housing Trust", later known as "WPHT Housing Association", with the aim of providing housing and services for people in need.

=== Accreditations ===
In June 2024, the Sanctuary central services teams (finance, technology, HR and sustainability) achieved gold Investors In People status. This follows gold awards for other parts of the organisation, including the development, student accommodation, housing, care and supported living divisions.

== Housing ==
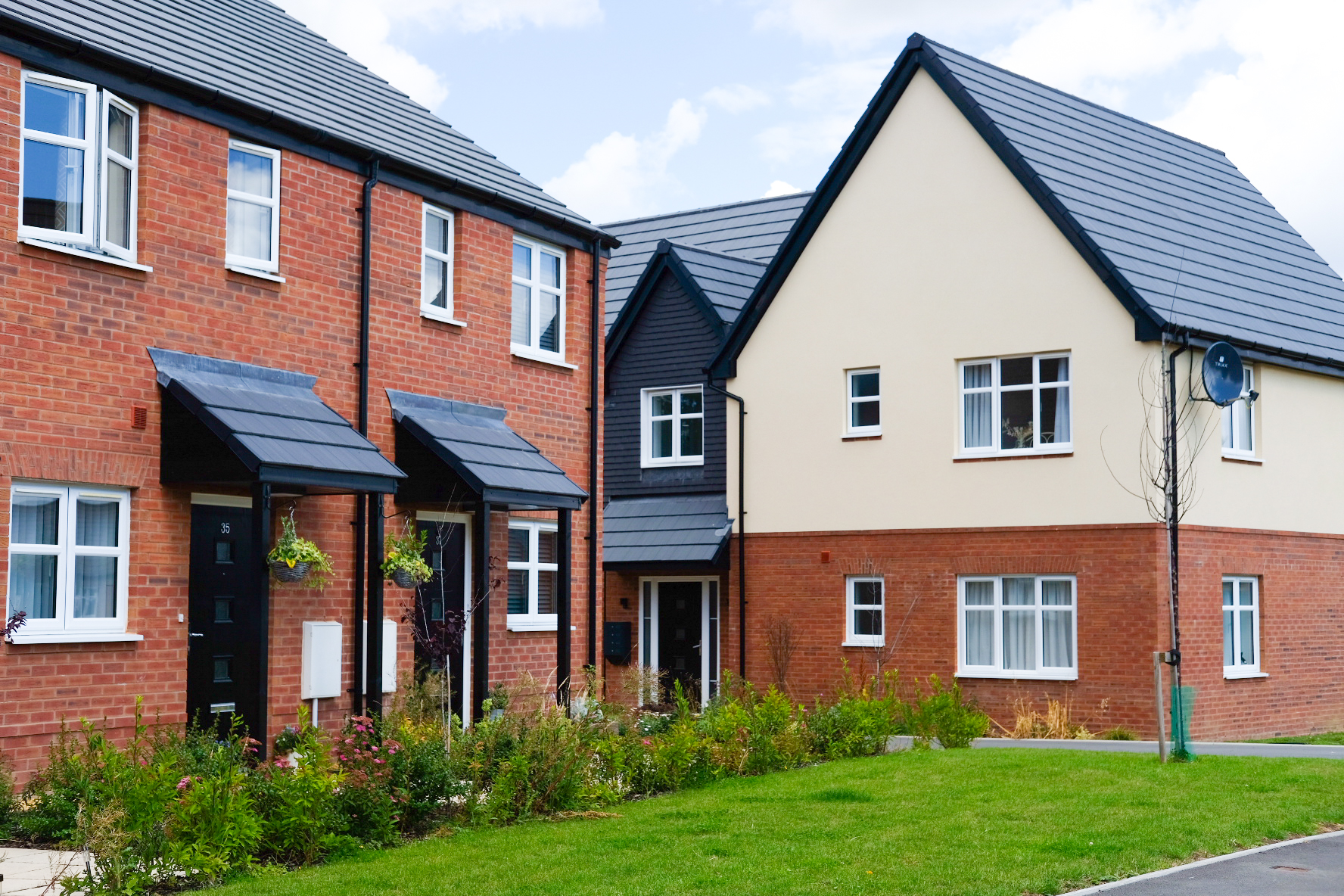
Sanctuary's "The Orchards", Worcester

Sanctuary manages 120,000 properties in the United Kingdom, with around 250,000 residents. Sanctuary is a trading name of Sanctuary Housing Association, an exempt charity in England and Wales.

Sanctuary Homes received a £3.4 million grant from the Scottish Government in 2019, to finance housing developments in Paisley, Renfrewshire.

Sanctuary runs a supported living operation for more than 500 people with learning disabilities.

Since 2016, Sanctuary has been redeveloping the former Glasgow Victoria Infirmary as The Victoria, including into 209 homes.

=== Mergers ===
Cornwall Council's Cornwall Care was absorbed into Sanctuary, who also acquired the council's care homes, in June 2022, and Swan Housing Association became a Sanctuary subsidiary, with a view to a full merger in future, in February 2023.

A proposed merger with Southern Housing Group was abandoned in April 2021. Johnnie Johnson Housing, which manages nearly 5000 properties in the north and midlands of England, became a subsidiary of Sanctuary in 2024.

=== Management, housing standards and severe maladministration ===
Sanctuary was the subject of a Channel 4 Dispatches documentary in March 2019 in which tenants complained about various issues including damp, woodworm and flooding. The episode was titled "New Landlords from hell". The Inside Housing website reported that a Sanctuary director claimed that investigations by regulators into issues arising from the documentary found no breaches of standards.

Sanctuary was criticised in the House of Commons in July 2019 by Mark Francois, MP for Rayleigh and Wickford, who said that it was "highly dysfunctional"’ and had "consistently provided a poor maintenance service to many of my constituents over a period of many years". Shortly after this Rochford District Council, which was then Conservative controlled, issued a joint statement with the association in which it said it had worked “successfully” with the association for 12 years.

The Housing Ombudsman has found multiple cases of severe maladministration by Sanctuary:

- COMPLAINT 202107263 (report date March 2023) involving severe maladministration in relation to damp and complaint handling
- COMPLAINT 202224898 (report date October 2023) involving severe maladministration in relation to damp and complaint handling
- COMPLAINT 202216547 (report date November 2023) involving severe maladministration in relation to a leak and complaint handling

In December 2023, Michael Gove (Secretary of State for Levelling Up, Housing & Communities) wrote to Sanctuary's CEO about the cases of severe maladministration found by the Housing Ombudsman.

In March 2024 Sanctuary reported on its own review into two cases of severe maladministration.

Sanctuary's published complaints statistics for 1 April 2023 to 31 March 2024 note that the ombudsman found 13 cases of severe maladministration and 50 cases of maladministration.

=== Empty homes ===
In March 2024 concerns were raised that Sanctuary had 250 empty homes in East Cambridgeshire.

=== Pay disputes ===
In April 2024 workers from Sanctuary Housing staged walk-outs over a pay dispute.

=== Sustainability ===
Along with four other housing associations – Abri, Anchor Hanover, Home Group and Hyde – Sanctuary is part of the Greener Futures Partnership (GFP). The GFP collectively owns 300,000 homes and members collaborate to improve energy efficiency and develop decarbonisation solutions.

=== Racism ===
In 2020, Sanctuary was accused of treating a black woman, Selma Nicholls (the CEO of a talent agency), unfairly compared with her white neighbour. Nicholls was paying up to £1,000 more per month than her white neighbour for an identical property. Nicholls was refunded £30,000 for the overpayment; investigators said they could not be sure whether racism played a part.
