= Hope Temple =

Irish composer

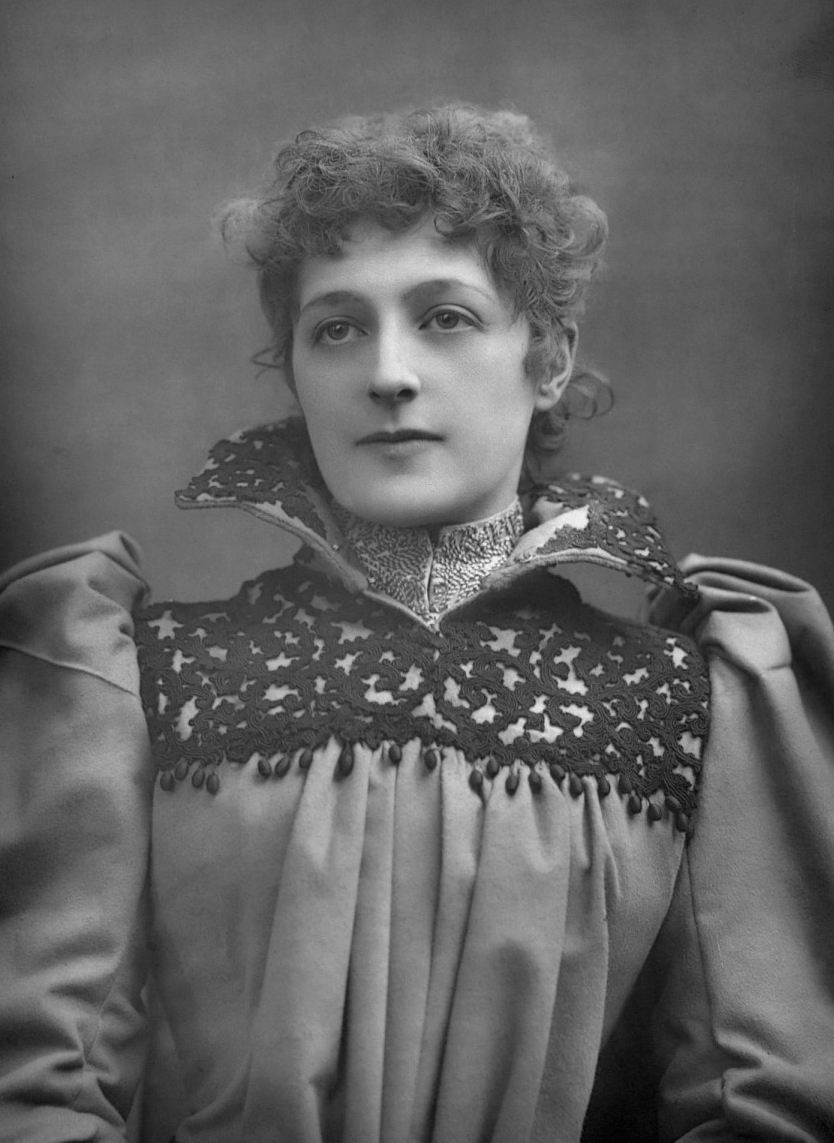
Hope Temple

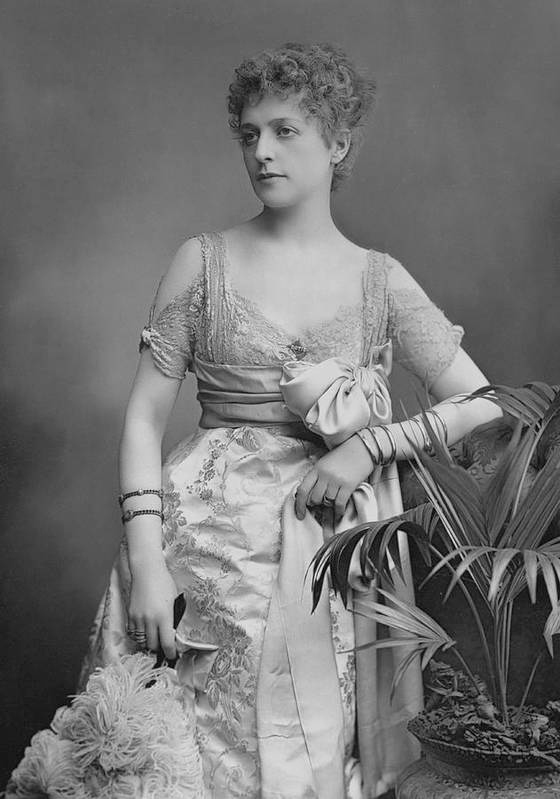
Hope Temple

Hope Temple, born as Alice Maude Davis (27 December 1859 – 10 May 1938) was an Irish songwriter and composer. She was also known as Mrs André Messager.

== Life ==
Alice Davis was born in Dublin, Ireland, and was known professionally as Hope Temple. She moved with her family to England aged 12 and began composing ballads at the age of 14. Initially she studied music with the idea of becoming a pianist, but an injury in a riding accident caused her to give up her ambitions. Her teachers in London included John Francis Barnett (piano) and Edouard Silas (harmony and counterpoint). In the early 1890s she continued her studies in Paris with André Wormser and André Messager. In 1892, her operetta The Wooden Spoon was produced in London (also in New York, 1893), but she was known primarily for her songs, some of which became very popular. Her song My Lady's Bower is sung by Molly Bloom in James Joyce's Ulysses.

In 1892, a reproduction of a photograph of her taken by Alex Bassano of Old Bond Street, London, was published in the Strand Magazine, as part of a series called "Types of English Beauty".

In 1894, she assisted Messager in writing the opera Mirette, and then became his second wife in 1895.

Hope Temple died in Folkestone, England.

== Selected works ==
=== Stage ===
- The Wooden Spoon (1892)
- Mirette, opéra comique (1894), with Andre Messager, Fred E. Weatherly, Harry Greenbank and Adrian Ross

=== Songs ===
- In Sweet September (Fred E. Weatherly), 1880
- Tis all that I can say (Thomas Hood), 1880
- She Walks in Beauty (Lord Byron), 1881
- An Old Garden (Helen Marion Burnside), c.1886
- My Lady's Bower (Fred E. Weatherly), 1887
- A Golden Argosy (Fred E. Weatherly), 1889
- Love and Friendship (John Muir), 1889
- Mary Grey (Clifton Bingham), 1890
- Rory Darlin' (Fred E. Weatherly), 1892
- Adieu l'amour / Love's Adieu (Catulle Blée), 1893
- Auf Wiederseh'n (Henry Wadsworth Longfellow), 1893
- Colin Deep (William Akerman), 1895
- The Garden of Dreams (Clifton Bingham), 1900
- Au bord des flots (Louis Fortolis), 1905

=== Piano music ===
- A Summer Dream (1895)
- A Night in Seville (c.1921)
