= Housing association =

Organisations providing low-cost social housing

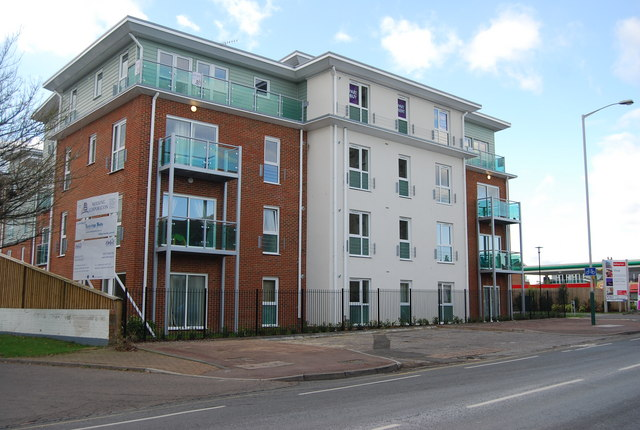
Housing association development in Royal Tunbridge Wells

In Ireland and the United Kingdom, housing associations are private, non-profit organisations that provide social housing for people in need of a home. Any budget surplus is used to maintain existing housing and to help finance new homes and it cannot be used for personal benefit of directors or shareholders. Although independent, they are regulated by the state and commonly receive public funding. They are now the United Kingdom's major providers of new housing for rent, while many also run shared ownership schemes to help those who cannot afford to buy a home outright.

Housing associations provide a wide range of housing, some managing large estates of housing for families, while the smallest may perhaps manage a single scheme of housing for older people. Much of the supported accommodation in the UK is also provided by housing associations, with specialist projects for people with mental health issues or learning disabilities, with substance misuse problems (alcohol or illegal drugs), the formerly homeless, young people, ex-offenders, asylum seekers, and people fleeing domestic violence.

In Australia, the term "housing association" refers to larger, growth-oriented 'not-for-dividend' community-housing providers. Smaller community housing providers may include trusts, cooperatives etc. State and territory-owned public housing represents about 80% of social housing in Australia. Over the years these public housing entities have had different names including: 'housing commissions', and 'housing trusts'.

== History ==
Housing associations first appeared in the second half of the nineteenth century as part of the growth in philanthropic and voluntary organisations brought about by the growth of the middle classes in the wake of the Industrial Revolution. Early examples are the Guinness Trust, Peabody Trust and the Metropolitan Association for Improving the Dwellings of the Industrious Classes.

They increased in importance over the last decades of the twentieth century due to changes to council housing brought in by the Thatcher government, when rules were introduced that prevented councils subsidising their housing from local taxes, channelled grants for construction of new social housing to housing associations and allowed council tenants to buy their homes at a large discount. This, combined with cost-cutting initiatives in local government and a housing benefit scheme that was more generous to housing associations than local authorities, led to many councils transferring their housing stock to housing associations. These organisations are often referred to as large-scale voluntary transfer organisations or local housing companies.

The Housing Acts of 1985 and 1988 facilitated the transfer of council housing to not-for-profit housing associations. The 1988 Act redefined housing associations as non-public bodies, permitting access to private finance, which was a strong motivation for transfer as public sector borrowing had been severely constrained. These new housing associations were also the providers of most new public-sector housing. By 2003 36.5% of the social rented housing stock was held by housing associations. Currently, some of the biggest housing associations in the UK are Clarion Housing Group, Sanctuary Housing, L&Q and Peabody Trust, to name just a few. Some housing associations have partnerships with real estate investment trusts: Civitas Social Housing is the largest social housing real estate investment trust, working with 15 housing associations.

== Legal status ==
Housing associations may be constituted using various forms of legal entity. Many are industrial and provident societies, but there are also trusts, co-operatives and companies. They may or may not be registered charities.

Registered social landlord (RSL) is the technical name for social landlords that in England were formerly registered with the Housing Corporation, or in Wales with the Welsh Government. From 2010 to 2012, associations were termed registered providers under the Housing and Regeneration Act 2008, irrespective of status (private, public, for-profit or not-for-profit). As of 2012, the terms registered social landlord and private registered providers of social housing are both used as alternative names for housing association.

=== Public-versus-private sector status ===
Housing associations are generally considered as private entities in that they are not owned or directly controlled by the state. This status, however, has been challenged by a number of legal rulings.

This issue had wider political significance since housing associations' borrowing (which stood at approximately £30 billion in 2006) does not contribute to the UK's public sector borrowing requirement, the control of which is both a stated government objective and part of the EU's criteria for membership of the European single currency.

==== Procurement ====
In 2004 the British government accepted a European Commission opinion which held that registered social landlords are bodies governed by public law for the purposes of procurement. As a result the Housing Corporation, the National Assembly for Wales, Communities Scotland and the Department for Social Development in Northern Ireland each issued guidance for RSLs on the application of the Public Procurement Directives to their acquisition of goods and services.

Following Brexit, housing associations continued to be covered by public procurement rules under the UK's replacement procurement regime, contained in the Procurement Act 2023.

==== Judicial review ====
The High Court of Justice in Weaver v. London and Quadrant Housing Trust [2008] EWHC 1377 (Admin) ruled that housing associations were public authorities and as a result could be subject to judicial review in certain circumstances. The court stated that the housing association sector was 'permeated by state control and influence with a view to meeting the government's aims for affordable housing, and in which RSLs work side by side with, and can in a very real sense be said to take the place of, local authorities'.

On appeal, the Court of Appeal affirmed that the registered social landlord in the case at issue was a 'hybrid public authority' for the purposes of section 6 of the Human Rights Act 1998. The court did however stress that this judgment did not automatically mean that all housing associations were henceforth to be regarded as public authorities and that other scenarios, particularly where a housing association was not in receipt of any public funds, could result in a different determination.

==== ONS classification ====
In November 2015, the Office for National Statistics (ONS) announced that, under the updated criteria of the 2010 version of the European System of Accounts, it was reclassifying all private registered providers (PRPs) of social housing in England as public-sector organisations, due to the level of public control exerted over their operations. This resulted in English PRP's combined debt of approximately £60 billion being added to the UK's public sector net debt. In September 2016, a further review reclassified registered providers of social housing in Northern Ireland, Scotland and Wales into the public sector, as well.

In response, the UK government passed various deregulatory measures as part of the Housing and Planning Act 2016, to reduce the amount of public control over PRPs in England. These measures resulted in the ONS reclassifying English PRPs back into the private sector in November 2017. Similar measures were passed in Scotland and Wales in 2018, and Northern Ireland in 2020.

===== OBR analysis =====
In a July 2019 report, the Office for Budget Responsibility (OBR) said the 2016–17 changes affecting PRPs in England had been 'precisely calibrated' by the government to surrender just enough control over PRPs to enable the ONS to reclassify them out of the public sector. The OBR further noted that the changes had been carried out with the explicit government objective of removing PRP's debt from the government books, in a form of off-balance-sheet fiscal management similar to a private finance initiative (PFI).

The OBR concluded that while the government had succeeded in moving PRP's debt back off the government ledger, the change had resulted in a 'fiscal illusion', in that PRPs would still be carrying out a 'public policy function' of supplying social housing, and that the government would still be de facto obliged to support them in the event of future financial difficulty.

== Management ==
A feature of housing associations is that, although the larger housing associations usually have paid staff, a committee or board of management made up of volunteers, or paid non-executive members, has overall responsibility for the work of the organisation. A board might include residents, representatives from local authorities and community groups, business people and politicians. There are more than 30,000 voluntary board members running housing associations throughout England.

== Funding and regulation ==
Housing associations' day-to-day activities are funded by rent and service charges payments made by, or on behalf of, those living in its properties. In this sense, housing associations are run as commercial entities and the majority do not depend on donations for their general activities.

New housing generally receives economic subsidies, the source of which will depend on where the association is based:

- In England, housing associations are funded and regulated by the Homes and Communities Agency (HCA), the exception being funding in London which from April 2012 is the responsibility of the Greater London Authority. The HCA's predecessor until 2008 was the Housing Corporation. The Housing Corporation's regulatory role was split out to a separate body from 2010, the Tenant Services Authority (TSA), but merged again into the HCA from April 2012.
- In Northern Ireland, the same role is carried out by the Northern Ireland Housing Executive.
- In Scotland, this function is fulfilled by the Scottish Government.
- In Wales, the regulation and funding of housing associations is carried out by the Welsh Government.

Subsidies for new homes (often termed 'social housing grant') amount to sizeable public investments. In its 2008–11 prospectus, the Housing Corporation stated that in the three-year period to 2011 investment would be "at least £8 billion". The majority of this would go to housing associations for use in development projects. Since 2003, in an effort to seek greater value for money, much of the funding by the Housing Corporation for new house building has been channelled to fewer than 80 "developing housing associations" that have achieved "partner status" through partner programme agreements. Long-term lender option borrower option loans (LOBOs) have been taken out in the past by housing associations.

Housing associations borrow money to pay for new homes and improvements. After the Housing Act 1988, the proportion of the cost of new homes met by capital grants was scaled back by the government, so borrowing became the primary source of funding for investment. Much of this was simply borrowed from banks and building societies, but after the 2008 financial crisis, these institutions ceased to offer long-term loans, so developing associations are increasingly turning to corporate bonds to raise funds for expansion.

The HCA implemented a new government policy of "affordable rents" for its 2011–15 funding round, requiring associations to set rents at up to 80% of market rents so that less up-front capital subsidy would be required. In September 2013, a group of London boroughs initiated a judicial review to challenge this policy.

== Landlord's obligations ==
A landlord's obligations are set out in several pieces of legislation, including the Landlord and Tenant Act 1985, which applies to tenancies entered into after 1961. In summary, section 11 provides that a landlord shall:

- keep in repair the structure and exterior of the dwelling, including drains, gutters and external pipes;
- keep in repair and proper working order the installations in the dwelling for the supply of water, gas, and electricity, and for sanitation (including basins, sinks, baths and sanitary conveniences, but not other fixtures, fittings and appliances for making use of the supply of water, gas or electricity), and keep in repair and proper working order the installation in the dwelling for space heating and heating water.

If a landlord refuses to repair a rented property, the tenant can take action to require them to carry out necessary works and claim compensation.

== Industry bodies ==
There are four industry bodies representing housing associations working in the UK, each covering a respective country. They are:

- England – National Housing Federation (NHF)
- Scotland – Scottish Federation of Housing Associations (SFHA)
- Wales – Community Housing Cymru
- Northern Ireland – Northern Ireland Federation of Housing Associations (NIFHA)

The NHF (formerly the National Federation of Housing Associations) claimed that at the start of 2003 they had around 1,400 non-profit housing organisations in their membership, owning or managing approximately 1.8 million homes across England.

In the 2000s, some larger associations formed regional groups for purposes including lobbying government bodies. The G15 group of London's largest associations was followed by East Seven in East Anglia.

== See also ==
- Decent Homes Standard
- Council house
- Public housing
- Arms-length management organisation
- Housing Action Trust
- Homeowners association
- Category:Housing associations
