= David Waterlow =

British politician

David Waterlow

David Sydney Waterlow (18 December 1857 – 25 August 1924), was a British Liberal Party politician and businessman.

== Background ==
He was born in Highgate, he was the fourth son of Sir Sydney Waterlow, a Liberal Member of Parliament. He was educated at Northampton and Lausanne. He married Edith Emma Maitland in 1883, and the couple had three daughters.

== Career ==
He travelled round the world in 1879. He joined the firm of Waterlow and Sons, Ltd, printers, in 1880. He retired from the firm in 1898 but subsequently became chairman in 1922. He was the Director of the Improved Industrial Dwellings Company, Ltd, from 1885 to 1924. He was a member of the London County Council, sitting for St Pancras North for the Liberal backed Progressive Party, from 1898 to 1910. He sat as Liberal MP for Islington North from 1906 to December 1910.

General election 1906 Islington North Electorate 12,075
Party	Candidate	Votes	%	±%
Liberal	David Sydney Waterlow	5,284		
Conservative	Sir George Christopher Trout Bartley	4,418		
Majority				
Turnout				
Liberal gain from Conservative		Swing		

General election January 1910 Islington North Electorate 12,677
Party	Candidate	Votes	%	±%
Liberal	David Sydney Waterlow	5,543		
Conservative	George Alexander Touche	5,512		
Majority				
Turnout				
Liberal hold		Swing		

General election December 1910 Islington North Electorate 12,677
Party	Candidate	Votes	%	±%
Conservative	George Alexander Touche	5,428		
Liberal	David Sydney Waterlow	5,022		
Majority				
Turnout				
Conservative gain from Liberal		Swing		

Waterlow remained active in politics: he was selected as Liberal prospective candidate for the parliamentary constituency of Mid Norfolk in 1912, but did not contest an election there. He also made two unsuccessful attempts to return to the London County Council: at Fulham in 1913 and Islington North in 1922.

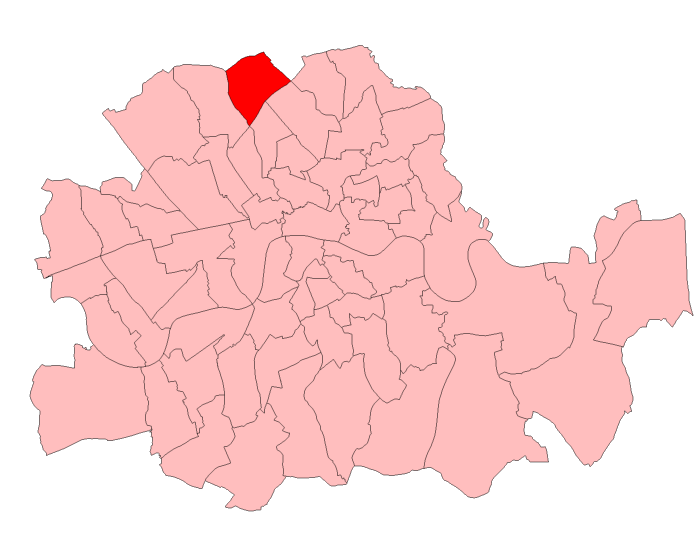
Islington North in the London County area 1918–49

1922 London County Council election: Islington North Electorate 41,314
Party	Candidate	Votes	%	±%
Municipal Reform	✓ Frederick Lionel Dove	8,644	26.9	+1.6
Municipal Reform	✓ Miss Rosamund Smith	7,970	24.8	−0.4
Labour	Robert McKenna	4,833	15.1	−34.4
Labour	Hilda Caroline Miall Smith	4,766	14.8	n/a
Progressive	David Sydney Waterlow	3,207	10.0	n/a
Progressive	W. Allen	2,692	8.4	n/a
Majority		3,137	9.7	33.9
Municipal Reform gain from Labour		Swing		
Municipal Reform hold		Swing	n/a	

He was Chairman of Governors at the United Westminster Schools in 1914. He became a Justice of the Peace in London in 1916. David Waterlow's sister, Mrs. Ruth Homan, was also politically active, being a member of the London School Board for Tower Hamlets.

He died at his home in Leatherhead, Surrey, in 1924, aged 66, following complications after surgery. He was buried at Brookwood Cemetery.

== Sources ==
- Craig, F. W. S. British Parliamentary Election Results 1885–1918,

Parliament of the United Kingdom
Preceded by George Trout Bartley	Member of Parliament for Islington North; 1906 – December 1910	Succeeded by George Touche
