= Dumfriesshire by-election =

Dumfriesshire by-election may refer to one of several by-elections held for the British House of Commons constituency of Dumfriesshire in Scotland, including:

- 1935 Dumfriesshire by-election
- 1963 Dumfriesshire by-election

See also

- Dumfriesshire (UK Parliament constituency)
