= Sir Sydney Waterlow, 1st Baronet =

English philanthropist and politician

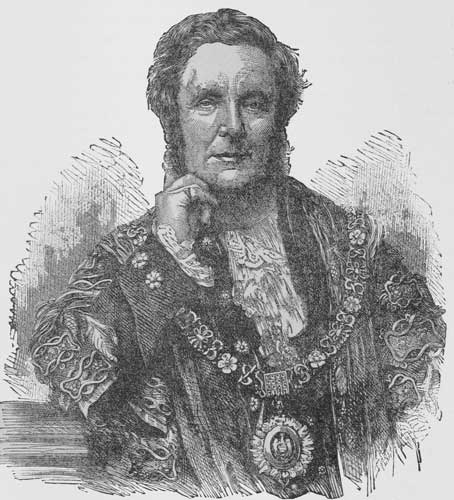
Portrait of Sir Sydney Waterlow, Lord Mayor of London in 1873, in official costume

Sir Sydney Hedley Waterlow, 1st Baronet, KCVO (1 November 1822 – 3 August 1906) was a British philanthropist and Liberal Party politician, principally remembered for donating Waterlow Park to the public as "a garden for the gardenless".

== Life ==
He was the son of James Waterlow and was born in Finsbury, on the edge of the City of London, and was brought up in Mile End. Educated at St Saviour's Grammar School, he was apprenticed to a stationer and printer and worked in the family firm of Waterlow and Sons, a large printing company employing over 2000 people. From that he moved into finance and became a director of the Union Bank of London. He was a Commissioner at the Great Exhibition in 1851 and a juror at the Paris International Exhibition in 1867, for which he was knighted.

He started his political career as a councillor in 1857 (when he introduced telegraph links between police stations). In 1863 he became an alderman and began his philanthropic works. He was chairman of the philanthropic housing company The Improved Industrial Dwellings Company, which built the Leopold Buildings and the Marlborough Buildings amongst others. He also worked for many other charities. He was a Sheriff of the City of London in 1866 and Lord Mayor of London from 1872 to 1873.

While he was Mayor he was instrumental, after a suggestion from The Lancet, in setting up the Metropolitan Hospital Sunday Fund. Having been knighted in 1867 Waterlow was created a Baronet of Fairseat in the parish of Wrotham in the County of Kent and of Highgate in the County of Middlesex on 4 August 1873. He was a Member of Parliament (MP) for Dumfriesshire from 1868 to 1869, when he was unseated on the grounds that he was a government contractor, his firm having taken a contract without his knowledge. He then sat for Maidstone (1874–1880) and Gravesend (1880–1885).

In 1870, he bought large areas of land in Kent, including the village of Fairseat (near Stansted), a major portion of Stansted as well as other pieces of land extending from Wrotham to Meopham. The parts of the estate were linked by a small bridge bearing the family crest over Trottiscliffe Road (which is still in evidence today. In 1887, he built Trosley Towers on the crest of the escarpment on the North Downs, to the east of Trottiscliffe Road. Two drives approached the house, and it was surrounded by wooded grounds. Later, other private drives were constructed, including Hamilton Drive which still survives within the Trosley Country Park and runs from the site of the old house to Commority Road.

In 1872 he gave Lauderdale House (now in Waterlow Park) to St Bartholomew's Hospital to be used as a convalescent home for the poor, staffed by nurses supplied by Florence Nightingale, and in 1889 he gave the surrounding park to the London County Council. His former house next to the park, Fairseat, became Channing Junior School.

Sir Sydney was appointed a Knight Commander of the Royal Victorian Order (KCVO) in 1902.

== Family ==
His fourth son, David Sydney Waterlow, was Liberal MP for Islington North. The artist Ernest Albert Waterlow was his nephew. His daughter, Ruth Waterlow (later Homan), was an educationist and women's welfare campaigner.

== Legacy ==
When Sir Sidney died aged 83 in 1906 at his Trosley Towers estate, Wrotham, his son Philip inherited his title and the estate. When Sir Philip died in 1931, the estate was sold off. Some of the houses were bought by their tenants; one of these was Pilgrims House, with six acres of land, which went for £600. Trosley Towers and the woodlands around it, were sold to 'Mr E. E. Shahmoon' in 1935. In 1936, Mr Shahmoon had Trosley Towers demolished and had Hamilton Lodge, built along with adjoining stables. One story suggests that the Lodge and stables were built to accommodate the racehorses of Rezā Shāh, the ruler of Persia.

The whole area was still owned by Mr Shahmoon when it was taken over by the army in 1942 during World War II and Hamilton Lodge was to be the HQ of the Army Brigade that was stationed here. Later the Trosley Towers Estate passed to Kent County Council, which created Trosley Country Park.

== Works ==
- Kay-Shuttleworth, U. J.; Waterlow, Sir Sydney (1874). "Dwelling of Working People in London" . Dwellings of working-people in London. London: Ridgway.

Parliament of the United Kingdom
Preceded by George Gustavus Walker	Member of Parliament for Dumfriesshire; 1868–1869	Succeeded by George Gustavus Walker
Preceded by James Whatman and Sir John Lubbock	Member of Parliament for Maidstone; 1874–1880; With: Sir John Lubbock	Succeeded by John Evans Freke-Aylmer and Alexander Henry Ross
Preceded by Thomas Bevan	Member of Parliament for Gravesend; 1880–1885	Succeeded by John Bazley White
Civic offices
Preceded by Sir Sills John Gibbons, Bt	Lord Mayor of London; 1872 – 1873	Succeeded by Sir Andrew Lusk, Bt
Baronetage of the United Kingdom
New creation	Baronet (of London); 1873–1906	Succeeded by Philip Waterlow
