= Waterlow baronets =

Baronetcy in the Baronetage of the United Kingdom

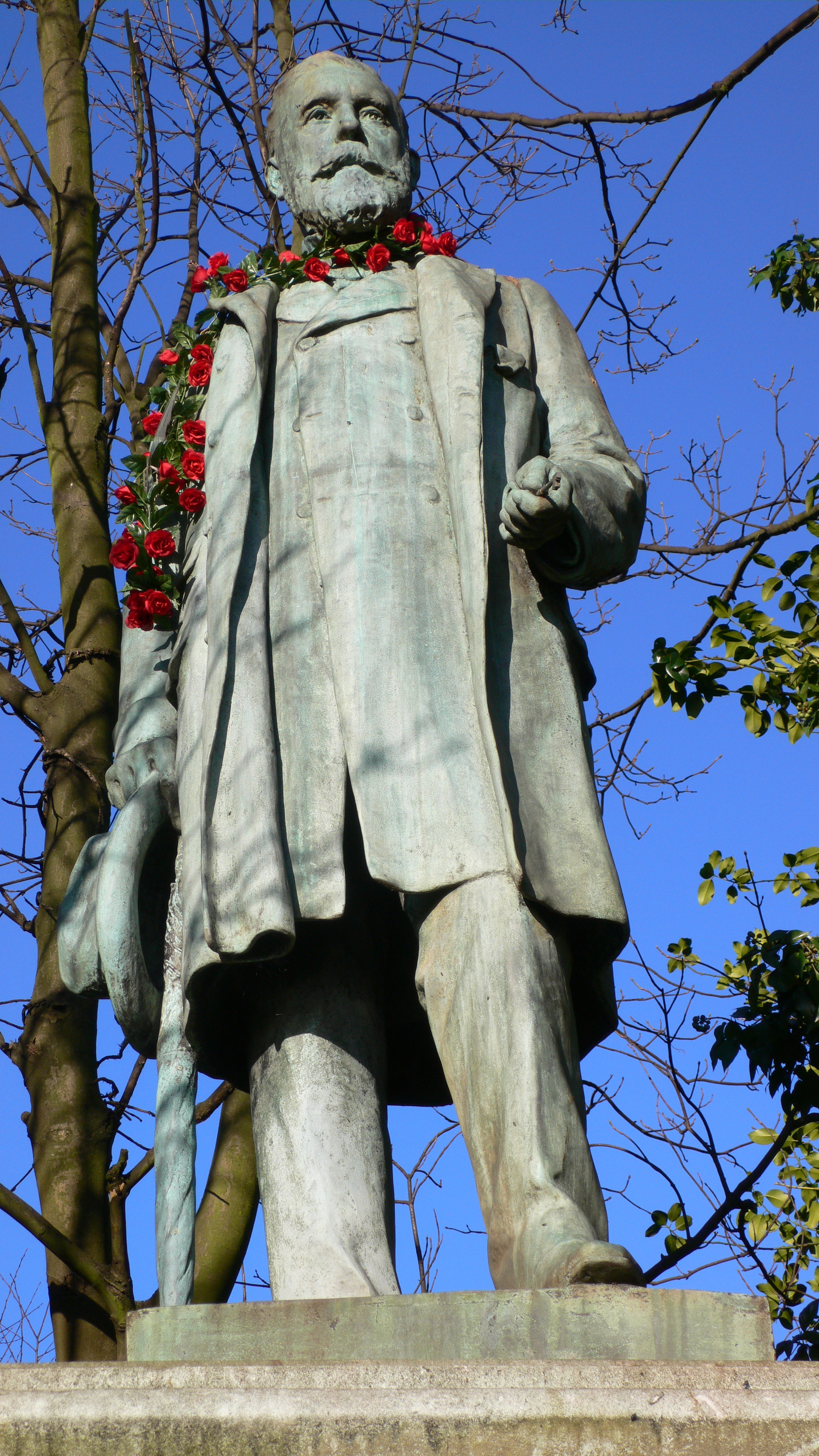
Statue of Sir Sydney Waterlow, 1st Baronet, in Waterlow Park

There have been two baronetcies created for members of the Waterlow family, both in the Baronetage of the United Kingdom. Both titles are extant as of 2010.

The Waterlow Baronetcy, of London, was created in the Baronetage of the United Kingdom on 4 August 1873 for the printer, philanthropist and Liberal politician Sydney Waterlow. The second Baronet was Chairman of Waterlow and Sons, Ltd. Sir Sydney Waterlow, son of George Sydney Waterlow, fourth son of the first Baronet, was Ambassador to Greece from 1933 to 1939.

The Waterlow Baronetcy, of Harrow Weald in the County of Middlesex, was created in the Baronetage of the United Kingdom on 28 October 1930 for William Waterlow, Managing Director of Waterlow Bros & Layton, Chairman of Waterlow and Sons Ltd and Lord Mayor of London between 1929 and 1930. He was the grandson of Alfred James Waterlow, elder brother of the first Baronet of the 1873 creation.

== Waterlow baronets, of London (1873) ==
- Sir Sydney Hedley Waterlow, KCVO, 1st Baronet (1822–1906)
- Sir Philip Hickson Waterlow, 2nd Baronet (1847–1931),
- Sir Edgar Lutwyche Waterlow, 3rd Baronet (1870–1954)
- Sir Philip Alexander Waterlow, 4th Baronet (1897–1973)
- Sir Christopher Rupert Waterlow, 5th Baronet (born 1959)

The current heir presumptive is Antony Waterlow

== Waterlow baronets, of Harrow Weald (1930) ==
- Sir William Alfred Waterlow, KBE, 1st Baronet (1871–1931)
- Sir William James Waterlow, CBE, 2nd Baronet (1905–1969)
- Sir Thomas Gordon Waterlow, CBE, 3rd Baronet (1911–1982)
- Sir (James) Gerard Waterlow, 4th Baronet (1939–2013)
- Sir Thomas James Waterlow, 5th Baronet (born 1970)

The heir presumptive is the present holder's first cousin Rufus Dudley Waterlow (born 1976).

Coat of arms of Waterlow baronets

Crest
A demi-lion guardant Azure in the mouth a shin-bone in bend and holding between the paws a human skull Or.
Escutcheon
Argent a lion rampant within a bordure nebuly Azure on a chief Sable two shinbones saltirewise the dexter surmounted by the sinister Or.
Motto
Per Mortem Vinco
