= William Waterlow =

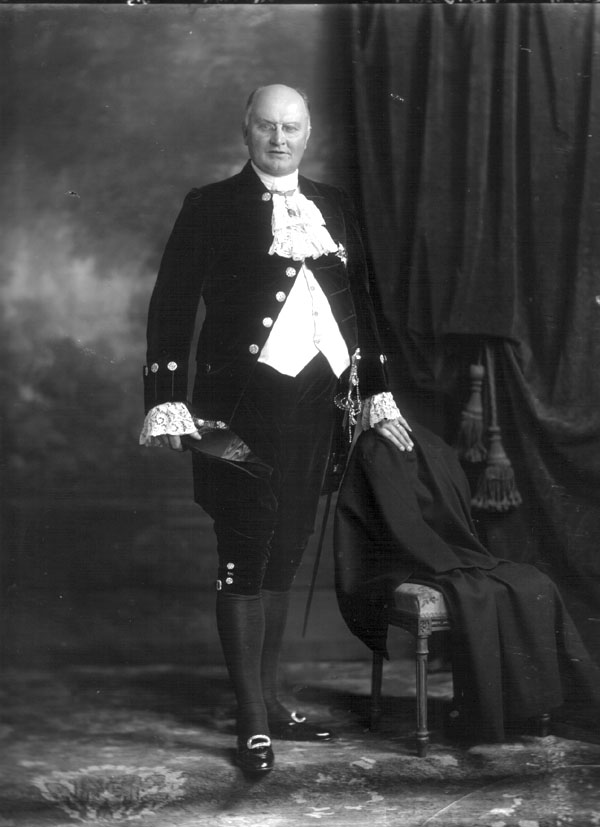
Sir William Alfred Waterlow, photographed 10 June 1926, wearing Velvet Court Dress (Old Style) and Star and badge of a Knight Commander of the Order of The British Empire

Sir William (Alfred) Waterlow, 1st Baronet, (23 April 1871 - 6 July 1931), was 602nd Lord Mayor of London.

Waterlow was educated at Marlborough College. He rose to become Managing Director of Waterlow and Sons and was knighted Knight Commander of the Order of the British Empire (KBE) in the 1919 New Year Honours. He became Alderman for Cornhill Ward and was elected a Sheriff of the City of London for 1928–29 and Lord Mayor of London for 1929–30. He was created a baronet, of Harrow Weald, on 28 October 1930.

He is best known for his involvement in the Portuguese Bank Note Crisis (1925) a fraud masterminded by Alves dos Reis.

Civic offices
| Preceded by Kynaston Studd | Lord Mayor of London; 1929–1930 | Succeeded by William Neal |
Baronetage of the United Kingdom
| New creation | Baronet (of Harrow Weald); 1930–1931 | Succeeded by William Waterlow |
