= Trosley Country Park =

Park in Kent, England

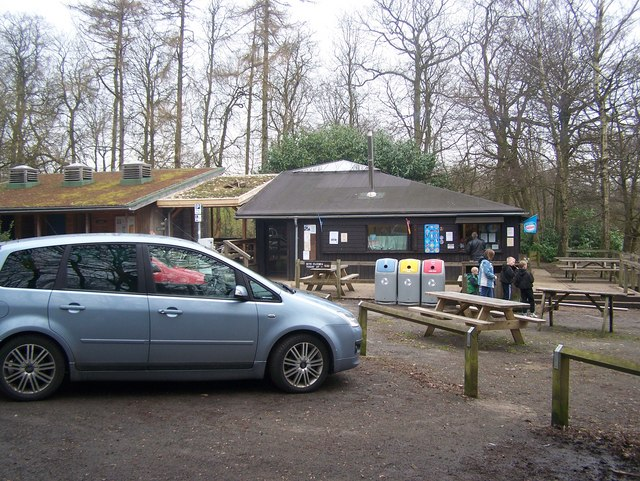
- Visitor Centre in Trosley Country Park

- Location within Kent
- OS grid: TQ633610
- Coordinates: 51°19′31″N 0°20′30″E
- Area: 170 acres (690,000 m^{2})
- Created: 1976
- Operator: Kent County Council,
- Status: Open 7 days a week, dawn until dusk
- Website: Kent City Council: Trosley Country Park

Trosley Country Park is in Trottiscliffe, near Vigo, in Kent, England. Once part of a large woodland estate then after many changes, it was passed to Kent County Council, who turned it into a large country park.

== History ==
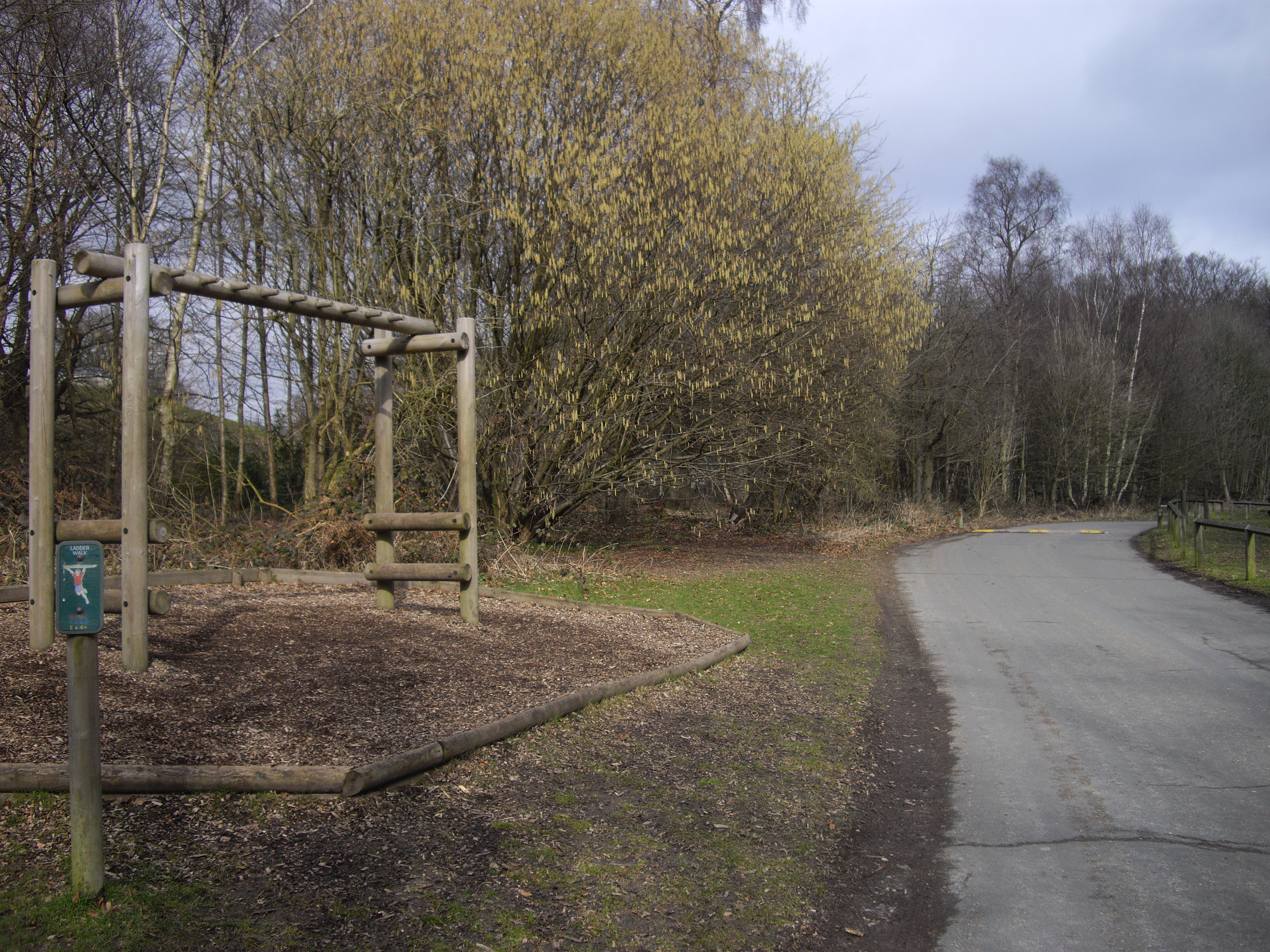
Exercise equipment within Trosley Country Park

The country park was once part of the Trosley Towers Estate.

In 1870, Sir Sydney Waterlow, 1st Baronet bought land that contained the village of Fairseat (near Stansted, Kent; 1 mile [1.6 km] west of Trottiscliffe), a major section of Stanstead as well as other pieces of land from Wrotham (2 miles [3.2 km] south of Trottiscliffe) to Meopham (2 miles [3.2 km] north of Trotiscliffe).

The manor house in the estate was later demolished.

The 170-acre (690,000 m^{2}) park was opened in 1976 by Kent County Council.

In 2004, an amenity block (with a public toilet facility, offices and store area) was built within the park. It had a sweet chestnut (Castanea sativa) timber cladding from the local trees in the park. Also built with a sedum roof and rainwater drainage system recycled into the toilet flushing systems. The building also won the Public Building category of the 2005 Kent Design Awards.

== Ecology ==
It is situated on the North Downs and the chalk grassland slopes of the park are a Site of Special Scientific Interest. These slopes were formerly used as grazing for farm animals, but were left to naturalise after the farms moved to the lower and more productive wealdland pastures. After the park was formed, these grasslands were cleared of scrub to allow the rare chalk land plants and animals to re-establish including the musk orchid, and chalkhill blue butterfly. Other meadow insects found include the dark green fritillary.

== Recreation ==
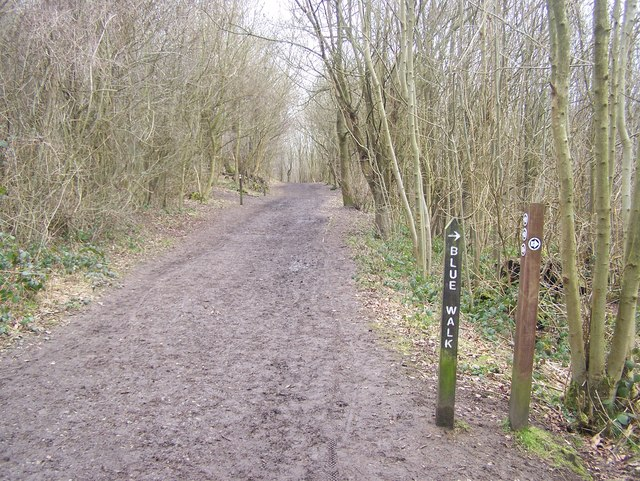
North Downs Way in Trosley

The park has various circular trails around the site, within Downs Wood, Great Wood and Butchers Wood. Three main trails are marked. The 'Red Route' is 2.5 miles (4.0 km) of fairly flat terrain that uses North Downs Way.The 'Yellow Route' is a 1.5-mile (2.4 km) trail that uses some of the Red Route but is an easier, shorter trail. The 'Blue Route' is 2 miles (3.2 km) long, and involves more challenging terrain, with steep hills and climbs. It also passes Little Pell (wood) Great Pell Field (meadow).

The North Downs Way leads via a bridleway through the Country Park on its way from Wrotham to Upper Halling.

An 'Adventurous Pub Walk' of 8.5 miles (13.7 km) starts in the park and leads to Ryarsh and Addington, before returning to the park. The Coldrum Trail also starts in the country park and leads to the Coldrum Stones, before returning to the park.

== Location ==
Situated off Junction 2 of the M20 motorway, the park is located off the A227 between Meopham and Wrotham.
