= Niall Macpherson, 1st Baron Drumalbyn =

The Right Honourable The Lord Drumalbyn KBE PC

Minister without portfolio
- In office 15 October 1970 – 8 January 1974
- Monarch: Elizabeth II
- Prime Minister: Edward Heath
- Preceded by: Peter Shore
- Succeeded by: The Lord Aberdare

Joint Minister of State for Trade with Edward du Cann
- In office 23 October 1963 – 16 October 1964
- Monarch: Elizabeth II
- Prime Minister: Sir Alec Douglas-Home
- Preceded by: Alan Green; The Lord Derwent
- Succeeded by: George Darling; Edward Redhead

Minister of Pensions and National Insurance
- In office 16 July 1962 – 20 October 1963
- Monarch: Elizabeth II
- Prime Minister: Harold Macmillan
- Preceded by: John Boyd-Carpenter
- Succeeded by: Hon. Richard Wood

Parliamentary Secretary to the Board of Trade
- In office 28 October 1960 – 16 July 1962
- Monarch: Elizabeth II
- Prime Minister: Harold Macmillan
- Preceded by: Sir John Rodgers
- Succeeded by: David Price

Parliamentary Under-Secretary of State for Scotland
- In office 13 June 1955 – 28 October 1960
- Monarch: Elizabeth II
- Prime Minister: Harold Macmillan; Anthony Eden
- Preceded by: Jack Nixon Browne
- Succeeded by: Richard Brooman-White

Member of the House of Lords Lord Temporal
- Hereditary peerage 9 November 1963 – 11 October 1987
- Preceded by: Peerage created
- Succeeded by: Peerage extinct

Member of Parliament for Dumfriesshire
- In office 26 July 1945 – 8 November 1963
- Preceded by: Henry Fildes
- Succeeded by: David Anderson

Personal details
- Born: 3 August 1908
- Died: 11 October 1987 (aged 79)
- Party: Scottish Unionist; National Liberal
- Spouse: Margaret Runge (d. 1979)
- Education: Trinity College, Oxford

Niall Malcolm Stewart Macpherson, 1st Baron Drumalbyn KBE PC (3 August 1908 – 11 October 1987) was a Scottish Tory and National Liberal politician.

== Background and education ==
The member of an important Liberal family from Inverness-shire, Macpherson was the eldest son of Sir Thomas Stewart Macpherson and Helen, daughter of Reverend Archibald Borland Cameron. He was the brother of George Macpherson and Sir Tommy Macpherson and a nephew of Lord Strathcarron. He was educated at Fettes College and Trinity College, Oxford. He initially worked in business, representing a firm in Turkey. He joined the Cameron Highlanders from 1939, serving in World War II including in Madagascar.

== Political career ==
Macpherson was elected Member of Parliament for Dumfriesshire at the 1945 general election. He served as Liberal-Unionist Scottish whip from 1950 to 1955, when he was appointed Joint Under-Secretary of State for Scotland by Sir Anthony Eden, a post he retained when Harold Macmillan became Prime Minister in early 1957. In 1960 he was made Parliamentary Secretary to the Board of Trade. Two years later Macpherson was sworn of the Privy Council and appointed Minister of Pensions and National Insurance. In October 1963 he was made Joint-Minister of State for Trade by the new Prime Minister, Sir Alec Douglas-Home, and the following month he was raised to the peerage as Baron Drumalbyn, of Whitesands in the Royal Burgh of Dumfries. He continued at the Board of Trade until the Conservative government fell at the 1964 general election. He was once again a member of the government as Minister without Portfolio under Edward Heath from 1970 to 1974.

Niall Macpherson Indemnity Act 1954 (Note: Section 2.)
- Act of Parliament
- Parliament of the United Kingdom
- Long title: An Act to indemnify Niall Macpherson, Esquire, from any penal consequences which he may have incurred by sitting or voting as a member of the House of Commons while holding the office of member of the London agency of the Dried Fruits Control Board of the Commonwealth of Australia, and to remove any disqualification for membership of that House by reason of his having held that office.
- Citation: 2 & 3 Eliz. 2. c. 29
- Territorial extent: United Kingdom

Dates
- Royal assent: 13 May 1954
- Commencement: 13 May 1954 (Note: The Acts of Parliament (Commencement) Act 1793.)
- Repealed: 12 May 1969 (Note: The Representation of the People Act 1969 (Commencement) Order 1969 (SI 1969/630).)
Other legislation
Repealed by	Representation of the People Act 1969

Status: Repealed

Text of statute as originally enacted

In 1954, his membership of the London agency of the Dried Fruits Control Board of the Commonwealth of Australia gave rise to concern that he might be disqualified from sitting or voting as a member of the House of Commons by virtue of the Succession to the Crown Act 1707. To avoid this problem, an Act of Indemnity, the Niall Macpherson Indemnity Act 1954 (2 & 3 Eliz. 2. c. 29), was passed.

Lord Drumalbyn was also chairman of the British Commonwealth Producers' Organization from 1952 and a member of the BBC General Advisory Council. In 1974 he was appointed a Knight Commander of the Order of the British Empire.

== Family ==
Lord Drumalbyn married Margaret Phyllis, daughter of Julius Joseph Runge, in 1937. They had three daughters, Jean Stewart Macpherson, who married James Weatherall, Mary Stewart Macpherson, who married Philip Dudley Wilson and Howard Alvine Rees; and (Helen) Norah Macpherson (1947–1969), who died unmarried. Lady Drumalbyn died on 13 August 1979. In 1985, Lord Drumalbyn married Rita, widow of Harry Edmiston. Lord Drumalbyn died on 11 October 1987, aged 79. The title became extinct on his death as he had no sons. His widow died on 12 March 2014.

== Notes ==
Parliament of the United Kingdom
Preceded by Henry Fildes	Member of Parliament for Dumfriesshire; 1945–1963	Succeeded by David Colville Anderson
Political offices
Preceded by Jack Browne; James Henderson Stewart	Joint Under-Secretary of State for Scotland; 1955–1960; With: Jack Browne 1955–1959; Lord John Hope 1957–1959; Tam Galbraith 1959–1960	Succeeded by Tam Galbraith; Gilmour Leburn
Preceded by John Rodgers	Parliamentary Secretary to the Board of Trade; 1960–1962	Succeeded by David Price
Preceded by John Boyd-Carpenter	Minister of Pensions and National Insurance; 1962–1963	Succeeded by Hon. Richard Wood
Preceded by Alan Green; The Lord Derwent	Joint Minister of State for Trade; 1963–1964; With: Edward du Cann	Succeeded by George Darling; Edward Redhead
Preceded by George Thomson (1968–1969)	Minister without Portfolio; 1970–1974	Succeeded by The Lord Aberdare
Peerage of the United Kingdom
New creation	Baron Drumalbyn; 1963–1987	Extinct
