= Crawfordton House =

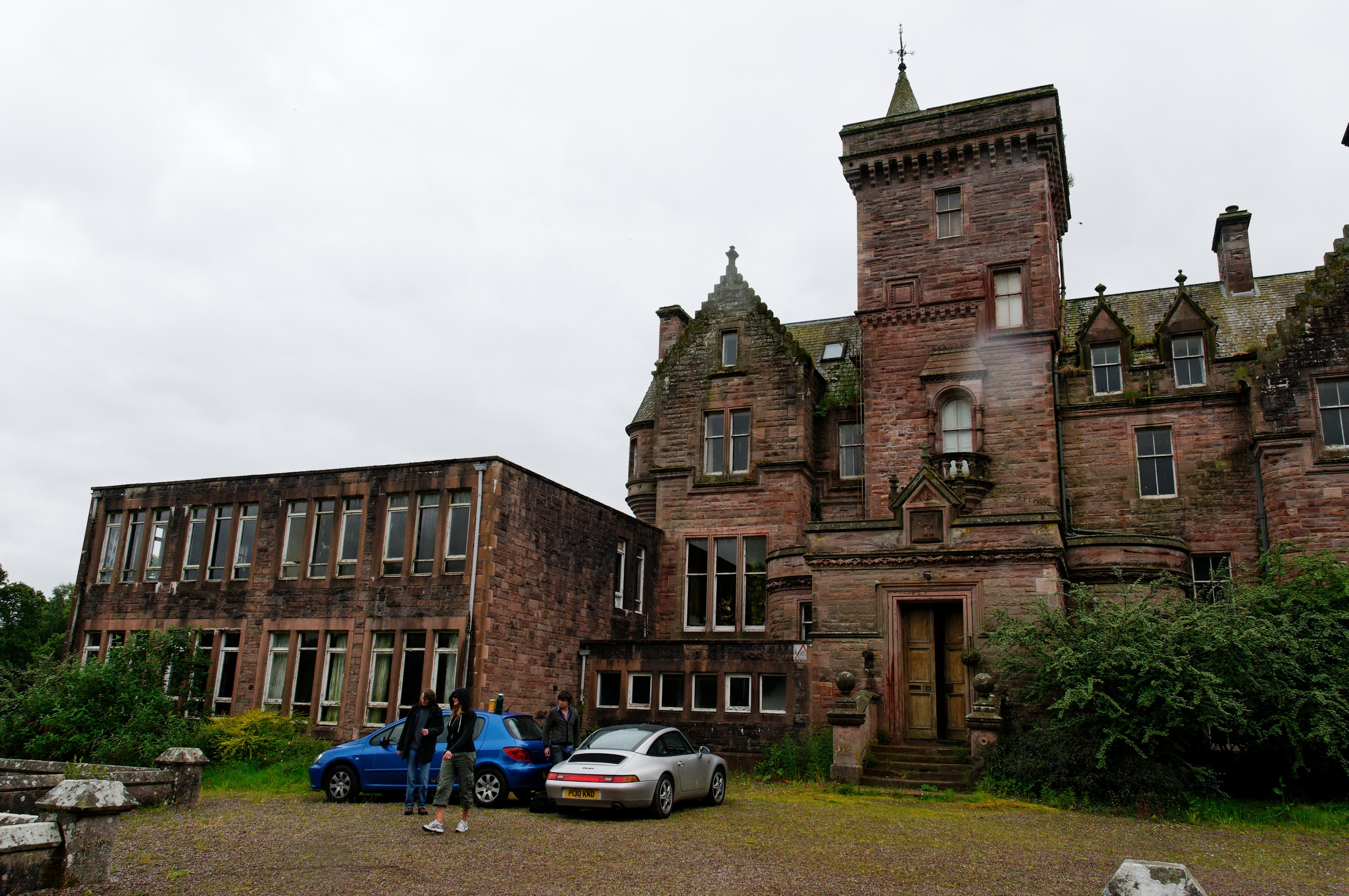
- Crawfordton House School following closure

- Location in Dumfries and Galloway
- 55.195°N 3.892°W

History
- Built: 1866

Site notes
- Architect(s): Peddie and Kinnear

Listed Building – Category B
- Designated: 26 June 1986
- Reference no.: LB10343

Crawfordton House is a category B listed 19th-century country house, situated close to Moniaive in Dumfriesshire, Scotland. It was operated as Crawfordton School in the second half of the 20th century.

== History ==
Crawfordton Tower was a tower house once held by the Crichtons in the 17th century and then the Hays. The site of Old Crawfordton is located around 2.5 kilometres (1.6 mi) south-east of the house.

Between 1863 and 1866 the present house was built for the Conservative politician Sir George Gustavus Walker (1831–1897), and designed by the Edinburgh-based architects Peddie & Kinnear. Built in local red sandstone, Crawfordton House is an example of Scottish Baronial architecture, with crowstepped gables, towers, turrets and carvings. There is a four-storey square tower over the entrance bay.

In 1940 the house was purchased for use as a school, and in 1941, pupils were evacuated from Belmont House School in East Renfrewshire to Crawfordton House, which had been converted into a preparatory school for this purpose. Extensions were built during the 1970s and 1980s, though these are excluded from the listed building. In 1995, Crawfordton House School closed down. The house was then run as Cademuir International School, which relocated from the Scottish Borders, but which ceased trading in 2006 due to financial difficulties.

Following closure of the school Crawfordton House was placed on the market. It remained unoccupied until 2013 when it was purchased by Hong Kong architect Kenneth Ko, who is currently renovating the house as a family home.

The house was again on the market in 2018, following extensive refurbishment by the current owner. In December 2021, Crawfordton House is said to be in the hands of 'Master Designer' Mr Kenneth Ko.
