= Joseph Hunter (British politician) =

Joseph Hunter (24 December 1875 – 24 July 1935) was a politician in the United Kingdom, and member of parliament (MP) from 1929 until his death.

In 1927 he had taken up a new post as Director of the Liberal Campaign Department centrally, a pivotal position during the run-up to the 1929 general election campaign when he was one of the party's national organisers.

At the 1929 general election, in his first parliamentary candidacy, he stood as the Liberal Party candidate for Dumfriesshire, winning the seat from the Conservative MP John Charteris. Hunter was re-elected in 1931 as a Liberal, but when the party split later that year over participation in the Conservative-dominated National Government, he joined the breakaway Liberal National Party.

Hunter died in office in July 1935, aged 59.

Parliament of the United Kingdom
Preceded by John Charteris	Member of Parliament for Dumfriesshire; 1929–1935	Succeeded by Henry Fildes
