= 1869 Dumfriesshire by-election =

UK parliamentary by-election

The 1869 Dumfriesshire by-election was fought on 31 March 1869. The by-election was fought due to the disqualification of the incumbent MP of the Liberal Party, Sydney Waterlow, as he was deemed to be a government contractor. It was won by the Conservative candidate George Gustavus Walker.
