= Sir William Neal, 1st Baronet =

British businessman and Lord Mayor of London

A portrait of Neal on 2 November 1930

Sir William Phené Neal, 1st Baronet (22 October 1860 – 7 July 1942), was a British businessman and 603rd Lord Mayor of London.

Neal published The Food Supply of the Nation in 1924. He served as Sheriff of London in 1929–30 and as Lord Mayor of London between 1930 and 1931. He was created a baronet, of Cherry Hinton in the County of Cambridge, in 1931. He died in July 1942, aged 81, when the baronetcy became extinct.

Civic offices
Preceded by Sir William Waterlow	Lord Mayor of London; 1930–1931	Succeeded by Sir Maurice Jenks
Baronetage of the United Kingdom
New creation	Baronet (of Cherry Hinton); 1931–1942	Extinct
