= Leopold Buildings =

Coordinates: 51.5280°N 0.0750°W

Leopold Buildings

Leopold Buildings is a historic tenement block of flats in Bethnal Green, in the East End of London, England, in what is now the London Borough of Tower Hamlets. It is located on Columbia Road, not far from Columbia Road Market.

The flats were built in 1872 by The Improved Industrial Dwellings Company, the philanthropic Model dwellings company founded and chaired by Sir Sydney Waterlow. It was built on land leased by Angela Burdett-Coutts - then the richest woman in Britain and, for her philanthropy, nicknamed the "Queen of the Poor".

The buildings were Grade II listed by English Heritage in 1994. Following years of neglect, the block was completely refurbished in a £3.5 million project in 1997 by the Floyd Slaski practice for the London Borough of Tower Hamlets and Ujima Housing Association, in conjunction with English Heritage.
