= David Anderson (judge) =

Scottish politician and judge (1916-1995)

- Anderson in 1961

Solicitor General for Scotland
- In office 1960–1964

Member of Parliament for Dumfriesshire
- In office 12 December 1963 – 25 September 1964

Personal details
- Born: 8 September 1916
- Died: 31 December 1995 (aged 79)
- Party: Unionist

David Colville Anderson VRD QC (8 September 1916 – 31 December 1995) was a Scottish law lecturer, advocate, Unionist MP, Solicitor General for Scotland, and judge, whose career ended in a bizarre sexual scandal. Also a naval officer during World War II, Anderson was honoured by the Norwegian king for preventing a rumoured Soviet invasion.

== Early life and RNVR service ==
From a Fife farming family and the son of a solicitor, Anderson was educated at Trinity College, Glenalmond and Pembroke College, Oxford. He graduated from Oxford in 1938 and then went to Edinburgh University on a Thow Scholarship, where he read for a Bachelor of Laws degree.

His studies were interrupted by the outbreak of war. Anderson was well prepared, because he had enjoyed pistol shooting as a hobby (winning the Ashburton Shield at Bisley for his school in 1933) and joined the Royal Naval Volunteer Reserve in 1935, commissioned Sub Lieutenant 20 April 1938. He was a member of the Inter-Services shooting team at Bisley from 1936 to 1938.

== Wartime and legal career ==
During the Second World War Anderson served on Royal Navy destroyers, being promoted Lieutenant 20 April 1940 and Mentioned in Despatches, for distinguished services aboard HMS Mendip, he won the Egerton Prize for Naval Gunnery in 1943. From 1943 to 1945 Anderson was Flotilla Gunnery Officer for the Rosyth Escort Force. He led a special operation to assist in preventing a revolt of Soviet Union troops being held as prisoners of war by the German Army in North Norway in 1945. British intelligence agencies suspected that Stalin intended to use the revolt as a pretext to launch an invasion of Norway, and Anderson was awarded the King Haakon VII Liberty Medal for the successful operation in 1946. After demobilisation he remained in the RNVR, awarded the Royal Naval Volunteer Reserve Officer's Decoration and a Clasp to the Decoration, promoted to Lieutenant-Commander 20 April 1948, he retired from the RNVR in 1960.

Resuming his studies at Edinburgh, he obtained a Distinction in his LLB in 1946. He won the Maclagan and Dalgety Prizes at Edinburgh. Qualifying as an Advocate in the same year, he became a lecturer in Scots Law at Edinburgh from 1947 while also practising. Anderson concentrated on government instructions and became Standing Junior Counsel to the Ministry of Works in 1953, transferring to the War Office in 1955. He gave this work up on being appointed a Queen's Counsel in 1957.

== Political career ==
Already interested in politics, Anderson had been the Unionist candidate in the safe Labour seat of Coatbridge and Airdrie in the 1955 general election and in the more marginal seat of East Dunbartonshire in 1959. He continued trying to find Unionist nominations in winnable seats.

Although not a member of parliament, Anderson was appointed Solicitor General for Scotland on 11 May 1960. This was a junior ministerial post within the government (advising the Scottish Office on legal matters) which was considered acceptable for an appointment from outside Parliament. He was also an ex-officio Commissioner for Northern Lighthouses, becoming vice-chairman in 1963.

When Niall Macpherson (Member of Parliament for Dumfriesshire) was given a Peerage at the end of 1963, Anderson was put forward to fight the seat in the ensuing by-election. It was speculated that the government's difficulty in guiding the Criminal Justice (Scotland) Bill through its Standing Committee stage in Parliament led to a decision that the Solicitor-General would be useful to have as a member of parliament. He kept the seat with a much-reduced majority of 971 after a low-key campaign.

Anderson was taken ill in March 1964 and was forced to announce his resignation from the government and from the Northern Lighthouse Board on 17 March. Initially intending to carry on as MP, a month later he gave up the candidacy and therefore left Parliament at the dissolution in September. When he recovered from illness, Anderson resumed his legal career and in 1965 was appointed Honorary Sheriff-Substitute for Lothians and Peebles. He was a chairman of Scottish Industrial Tribunals from 1971 to 1972 and was chief reporter for public inquiries and under-secretary for the Scottish Office from 1972.

== Scandal and trial ==
Anderson's legal career ended when he was fined £50 for accosting two 14-year-old girls, and asking them to walk on him and beat him up. He had been in Troon on 18 December 1972, presiding over the first major public inquiry of his new post. The prosecution claimed that Anderson, finding himself out of his home town, had approached the girls and asked them to go to a quiet place with him.

The case was controversial, as the girls failed to identify Anderson, and he received an alibi from one of the staff members of the hotel where he was staying. The identification, in particular, had numerous inconsistencies. For example, the initial report described a "well-built" man with white or blonde hair, whereas Anderson was considered slight and had dark hair. Additionally, the girls described the car as having an Edinburgh registration plate with the digits 4, 5, and another digit, while Anderson's car had an Edinburgh plate "555" and was of a different make, colour, and body type. Anderson, who feared that the KGB had framed him in an act of revenge by using a lookalike to impersonate him and compromise him, appealed against the conviction but lost. He was dismissed from his posts in 1974.

Such were the inconsistencies and poor process that several high-profile, but unsuccessful attempts were made to clear Anderson's name, including debates in the Lords and Commons and an investigation by the Scottish Criminal Cases Review Commission. He continued to press his innocence and in 1980 the playwright John Hale wrote The Case of David Anderson QC which was sympathetic to his position. The play was put on in Manchester, Edinburgh and at the Lyric Theatre in Hammersmith. Anderson had not succeeded in clearing his name by the time of his death, aged 79, on 31 December 1995. In September 2002 it was announced that the Scottish Criminal Cases Review Commission was looking into the case, but it concluded in February 2005 that the conviction should stand.

In her 2010 autobiography Lady Judy Steel, wife of Scottish politician David Steel, claimed that a man had made an almost identical indecent proposal to her when she was a teenage student at Edinburgh University. When she later learned of the 1972 case she concluded that the two assailants must have been the same man, and named Anderson on the presumption of guilt.

== See also ==
- List of United Kingdom MPs with the shortest service

Legal offices
Preceded by William Grant	Solicitor General for Scotland; 1960–1964	Succeeded by Norman Wylie
Parliament of the United Kingdom
Preceded by Niall Macpherson	Member of Parliament for Dumfriesshire; 1963–1964	Succeeded by Hector Monro
