= 1935 Dumfriesshire by-election =

UK parliamentary by-election

The 1935 Dumfriesshire by-election was a by-election held for the British House of Commons constituency of Dumfriesshire in Scotland on 12 September 1935. The by-election was won by the Liberal National Party candidate Sir Henry Fildes.

It was the last by-election of the 1931–1935 Parliament. Only six weeks later, on 25 October, Parliament was dissolved for the 1935 general election.

== Vacancy ==
The Liberal National MP Dr Joseph Hunter had died on 24 July 1935, aged 59. He had held the seat since the 1929 general election.

== Candidates ==
The parties in the National Government did not usually contest by-elections in seats held by other governing parties, so the Liberal National Party candidate Sir Henry Fildes did not face a Conservative opponent.

The only other candidate was J. Downie, Labour Co-operative.

== Result ==
On a reduced turnout, Fildes held the seat for the Liberal Nationals, with a reduced but still large majority, taking over 60% of the votes. He was re-elected at the general election in November 1935, and held the seat until he stood down at the 1945 general election.

Dumfriesshire by-election, 1935
Party	Candidate	Votes	%	±%
Liberal National	Henry Fildes	16,271	60.3	−17.4
Labour Co-op	J. Downie	10,697	39.7	+17.4
Majority		5,574	20.6	−34.8
Turnout		26,968	58.7	−18.9
Liberal National hold		Swing	−17.4	

== Previous result ==
General election 1931: Dumfriesshire
Party	Candidate	Votes	%	±%
Liberal	Joseph Hunter	26,873	77.7	+32.6
Labour	J. S. Paterson	7,693	22.3	+3.6
Majority		19,180	55.4	+46.5
Turnout		34,566	77.6	−3.8
Liberal hold		Swing		

- Note: Hunter left the Liberal Party and joined the Liberal National Party, in June 1934, during the Parliament.

== See also ==
- Dumfriesshire (UK Parliament constituency)
- Dumfriesshire
- 1963 Dumfriesshire by-election
- List of United Kingdom by-elections (1931–1950)

== Sources ==
- Craig, F. W. S. (1983) [1969]. British parliamentary election results 1918-1949 (3rd ed.). Chichester: Parliamentary Research Services. ISBN 0-900178-06-X.
- Leigh Rayment's Historical List of MPs
