= Marlborough Buildings =

Coordinates: 51.4945°N 0.1663°W

The Marlborough
- Former names: Marlborough Buildings

General information
- Location: Walton Street, Chelsea
- Year built: 1890
- Owner: Originally the Improved Industrial Dwellings Company

Height
- Height: six storey

Technical details
- Material: brick

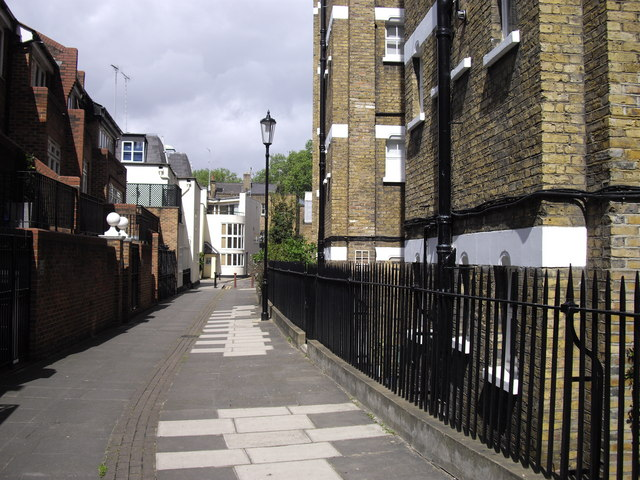
Bull's Gardens. The rear of one of the Marlborough Buildings blocks is on the right.

The Marlborough Buildings is the original name for two historic blocks of flats in Chelsea, London, now known as The Marlborough.

== History ==
The Marlborough Buildings were built in 1890 by the Improved Industrial Dwellings Company on the site of cottages in Bull's Gardens. This was part of a late Victorian movement to improve housing for the working poor. At the time the site was regarded as a poor area. In Charles Booth's poverty map the area is classified as "Very poor, casual. Chronic want". The buildings consisted of two blocks with a courtyard in between. They provided low cost housing for 500 people. The entrance was through an arch from Walton Street. It was one of a number of social housing projects in Chelsea.

== College life ==
While the buildings were still under construction, rooms to accommodate eight residents were taken by the Chelsea University Extension Committee. The idea (described as an experiment) was to provide evening-class students with 'some of the advantages of college life'. At a cost of 10s 6d (52 1/2 p) 'each resident will have a furnished private room, with the use of common dining and reading rooms.' The rooms were only to be available to bona-fide extension students. This scheme followed similar successful innovations at Toynbee Hall, Wadham and Balliol (in the East End, but named after their Oxford counterparts). An extension of the scheme to provide accommodation for women students was under consideration.

== Recent developments ==
The original owners sold the property and in the 1970s and 80s, the flats transitioned from low-rent social housing into private ownership. The site was renamed The Marlborough – reflecting its gentrified status as a desirable address. In 2015, the courtyard was redesigned by Chris Dyson Associates and the landscaping was undertaken by Frost Landscapes. There is now a second entrance from Richard's Place.
