= Dumfriesshire (UK Parliament constituency) =

Parliamentary constituency in the United Kingdom, 1801–2005

- Former county constituency for the House of Commons
- Boundary of Dumfriesshire in Scotland for the 2001 general election

1708–2005
- Seats: one
- Created from: Dumfriesshire
- Replaced by: Dumfriesshire, Clydesdale & Tweeddale; Dumfries & Galloway

Dumfriesshire was a county constituency represented in the House of Commons of Great Britain (at Westminster) from 1708 to 1801 and in the House of Commons of the Parliament of the United Kingdom (also at Westminster) from 1801 until 2005. It was known as Dumfries from 1950.

== Creation ==
The British parliamentary constituency was created in 1707 following the Acts of Union, 1707 and replaced the former Parliament of Scotland shire constituency of Dumfries & Annandale.

== History ==
The constituency was virtually unchanged until it was redistributed in 2005. It was redistributed to Dumfriesshire, Clydesdale and Tweeddale and Dumfries and Galloway as part of a major reorganisation of Scottish constituencies. It returned one Member of Parliament (MP) by the first past the post system.

== Boundaries ==
From 1885 to 1918 it comprised the shire districts of the county. From 1918 all the burghs were added.

== Members of Parliament ==
=== MPs 1708–1832 ===
Year	Member	Party
1708	James Johnstone	
1709	William Grierson	
1711	James Murray	Tory
1713	Sir William Johnstone	
1722	Charles Erskine	
1741	Sir John Douglas	
1747	Lord Charles Douglas	
1755	James Veitch	
1761	Lt Gen Archibald Douglas	
1774	Sir Robert Laurie	
1804	Sir William Johnstone Hope	Tory
1830	John Hope-Johnstone	Tory
1832	Reform Act 1832: franchise expanded	

=== MPs 1832–2005 ===
Election	Member	Party
1832	John Hope-Johnstone (1)	Conservative
1847	Archibald Douglas	Conservative
Feb 1857	John Hope-Johnstone (1)	Conservative
1865	George Gustavus Walker	Conservative
1868	Sydney Waterlow	Liberal
Mar. 1869	George Gustavus Walker	Conservative
1874	John Hope-Johnstone (2)	Conservative
1880	Sir Robert Jardine	Liberal
1886	Sir Robert Jardine	Liberal Unionist
1892	William Herries Maxwell	Liberal Unionist
1895	Robinson Souttar	Liberal
1900	William Herries Maxwell	Liberal Unionist
1906	Percy Molteno	Liberal
1918	William Murray	Unionist
1922	William Chapple	Liberal
1924	John Charteris	Unionist
1929	Dr Joseph Hunter ^{1}	Liberal
1931	Dr Joseph Hunter ^{1}	National Liberal
1935 by-election	Sir Henry Fildes	National Liberal
1945	Niall Macpherson	National Liberal
1963 by-election	David Anderson	Conservative
1964	Sir Hector Monro	Conservative
1997	Russell Brown	Labour
2005	constituency abolished	

^{1} Dr Hunter was elected in 1929 as a Liberal candidate, but in the split after the 1931 general election, he joined the National Liberals.

== Election results ==
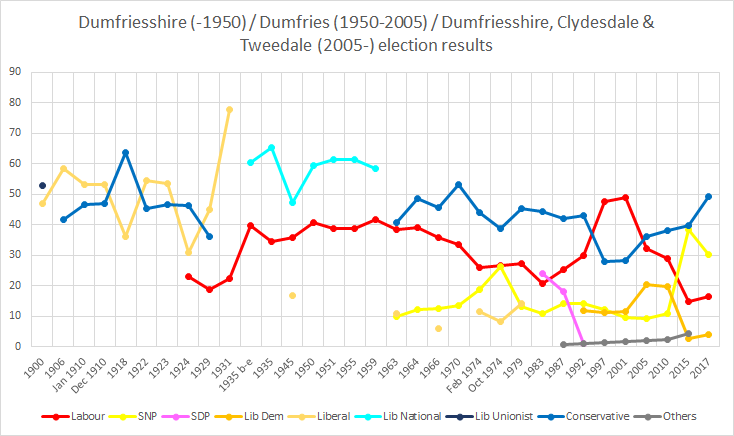
Dumfriesshire election results

=== Elections in the 1830s ===
General election 1830: Dumfriesshire
Party	Candidate	Votes	%
Tory	John Hope-Johnstone	Unopposed	
Registered electors		84	
Tory hold			

General election 1831: Dumfriesshire
Party	Candidate	Votes	%
Tory	John Hope-Johnstone	Unopposed	
Registered electors		84	
Tory hold			

General election 1832: Dumfriesshire
Party	Candidate	Votes	%
Tory	John Hope-Johnstone	Unopposed	
Registered electors		1,123	
Tory hold			

General election 1835: Dumfriesshire
Party	Candidate	Votes	%
Conservative	John Hope-Johnstone	Unopposed	
Registered electors		1,374	
Conservative hold			

General election 1837: Dumfriesshire
Party	Candidate	Votes	%
Conservative	John Hope-Johnstone	Unopposed	
Registered electors		1,461	
Conservative hold			

=== Elections in the 1840s ===
General election 1841: Dumfriesshire
Party	Candidate	Votes	%	±%
Conservative	John Hope-Johnstone	Unopposed		
Registered electors		1,912		
Conservative hold				

General election 1847: Dumfriesshire
Party	Candidate	Votes	%	±%
Conservative	Archibald Douglas	Unopposed		
Registered electors		2,485		
Conservative hold				

=== Elections in the 1850s ===
General election 1852: Dumfriesshire
Party	Candidate	Votes	%	±%
Conservative	Archibald Douglas	Unopposed		
Registered electors		2,520		
Conservative hold				

Douglas was appointed Comptroller of the Household, requiring a by-election.

By-election, 12 January 1853: Dumfriesshire
Party	Candidate	Votes	%	±%
Conservative	Archibald Douglas	Unopposed		
Conservative hold				

Douglas succeeded to the peerage, becoming 8th Marquess of Queensberry and causing a by-election.

By-election, 12 February 1857: Dumfriesshire
Party	Candidate	Votes	%	±%
Conservative	John Hope-Johnstone	Unopposed		
Conservative hold				

General election 1857: Dumfriesshire
Party	Candidate	Votes	%	±%
Conservative	John Hope-Johnstone	Unopposed		
Registered electors		2,702		
Conservative hold				

General election 1859: Dumfriesshire
Party	Candidate	Votes	%	±%
Conservative	John Hope-Johnstone	Unopposed		
Registered electors		3,192		
Conservative hold				

=== Elections in the 1860s ===
General election 1865: Dumfriesshire
Party	Candidate	Votes	%	±%
Conservative	George Gustavus Walker	Unopposed		
Registered electors		2,097		
Conservative hold				

General election 1868: Dumfriesshire
Party	Candidate	Votes	%	±%
Liberal	Sydney Waterlow	1,100	51.0	New
Conservative	George Gustavus Walker	1,056	49.0	N/A
Majority		44	2.0	N/A
Turnout		2,156	72.1	N/A
Registered electors		2,989		
Liberal gain from Conservative		Swing	N/A	

Waterlow was disqualified, owing to holding a government contract at the time of the election, causing a by-election.

By-election, 31 March 1869: Dumfriesshire
Party	Candidate	Votes	%	±%
Conservative	George Gustavus Walker	1,117	50.8	+1.8
Liberal	Sydney Waterlow	1,081	49.2	−1.8
Majority		36	1.6	N/A
Turnout		2,198	73.5	+1.4
Registered electors		2,989		
Conservative gain from Liberal		Swing	+1.8	

=== Elections in the 1870s ===
General election 1874: Dumfriesshire
Party	Candidate	Votes	%	±%
Conservative	John Hope-Johnstone	1,453	52.5	+3.5
Liberal	Robert Jardine	1,315	47.5	−3.5
Majority		138	5.0	N/A
Turnout		2,768	88.4	+16.3
Registered electors		3,130		
Conservative gain from Liberal		Swing	+3.5	

=== Elections in the 1880s ===
General election 1880: Dumfriesshire
Party	Candidate	Votes	%	±%
Liberal	Robert Jardine	1,577	51.2	+3.7
Conservative	George Gustavus Walker	1,505	48.8	−3.7
Majority		72	2.4	N/A
Turnout		3,082	91.2	+2.8
Registered electors		3,379		
Liberal gain from Conservative		Swing	+3.7	

General election 1885: Dumfriesshire
Party	Candidate	Votes	%	±%
Liberal	Robert Jardine	4,857	57.7	+6.5
Conservative	Walter Montagu Douglas Scott	3,566	42.3	−6.5
Majority		1,291	15.4	+13.0
Turnout		8,423	88.8	−2.4
Registered electors		9,489		
Liberal hold		Swing	+6.5	

General election 1886: Dumfriesshire
Party	Candidate	Votes	%	±%
Liberal Unionist	Robert Jardine	4,106	55.8	+13.5
Liberal	Thomas McKie	3,252	44.2	−13.5
Majority		854	11.6	N/A
Turnout		7,358	77.5	−11.3
Registered electors		9,489		
Liberal Unionist gain from Liberal		Swing	+13.5	

=== Elections in the 1890s ===
General election 1892: Dumfriesshire
Party	Candidate	Votes	%	±%
Liberal Unionist	William Herries Maxwell	4,123	51.7	−4.1
Liberal	Thomas McKie	3,849	48.3	+4.1
Majority		274	3.4	−8.2
Turnout		7,972	86.4	+8.9
Registered electors		9,229		
Liberal Unionist hold		Swing	-4.1	

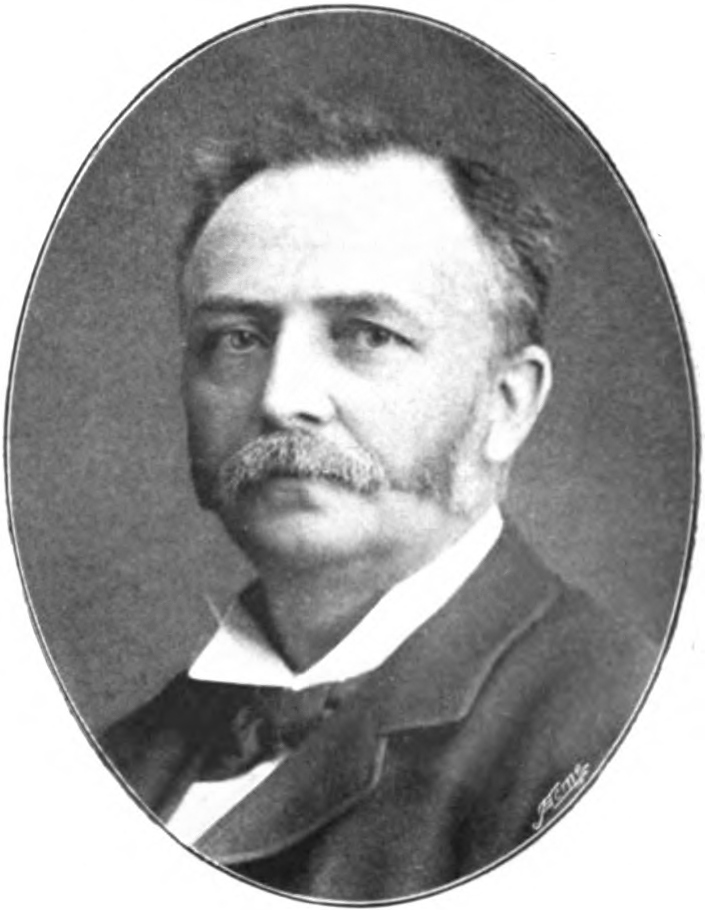
Souttar

General election 1895: Dumfriesshire
Party	Candidate	Votes	%	±%
Liberal	Robinson Souttar	3,965	51.1	+1.8
Liberal Unionist	William Herries Maxwell	3,952	49.9	−1.8
Majority		13	0.2	N/A
Turnout		7,917	86.7	+0.3
Registered electors		9,134		
Liberal gain from Liberal Unionist		Swing	+1.8	

=== Elections in the 1900s ===
General election 1900: Dumfriesshire
Party	Candidate	Votes	%	±%
Liberal Unionist	William Herries Maxwell	4,124	52.9	+3.0
Liberal	Robinson Souttar	3,675	47.1	−3.0
Majority		449	5.8	N/A
Turnout		7,799	85.0	−1.7
Registered electors		9,178		
Liberal Unionist gain from Liberal		Swing	+3.0	

Molteno

General election 1906: Dumfriesshire
Party	Candidate	Votes	%	±%
Liberal	Percy Molteno	4,814	58.4	+11.3
Conservative	J.H. Balfour-Browne	3,431	41.6	−11.3
Majority		1,383	16.8	N/A
Turnout		8,245	87.8	+2.8
Registered electors		9,394		
Liberal gain from Liberal Unionist		Swing	+11.3	

=== Elections in the 1910s ===
General election January 1910: Dumfriesshire
Party	Candidate	Votes	%	±%
Liberal	Percy Molteno	4,666	53.3	−5.1
Conservative	William Murray	4,091	46.7	+5.1
Majority		575	6.6	−10.2
Turnout		8,757	90.7	+2.9
Liberal hold		Swing	-5.1	

General election December 1910: Dumfriesshire
Party	Candidate	Votes	%	±%
Liberal	Percy Molteno	4,708	53.2	−0.1
Conservative	William Murray	4,146	46.8	+0.1
Majority		562	6.4	−0.2
Turnout		8,854	90.7	0.0
Liberal hold		Swing	0.0	

General Election 1914–15:

Another General Election was required to take place before the end of 1915. The political parties had been making preparations for an election to take place and by July 1914, the following candidates had been selected;

- Liberal:
- Unionist: William T. Shaw

General election 1918: Dumfriesshire
Party		Candidate	Votes	%	±%
C	Unionist	William Murray	13,345	63.8	+17.0
	Liberal	John Gulland	7,562	36.2	−17.0
Majority			5,783	27.6	+21.2
Turnout			20,907	57.4	−33.3
Registered electors			36,394		
	Unionist gain from Liberal		Swing	+17.0	
C indicates candidate endorsed by the coalition government.

=== Elections in the 1920s ===
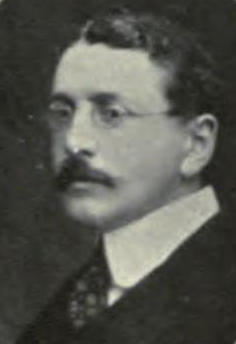
Keswick

General election 1922: Dumfriesshire
Party	Candidate	Votes	%	±%
Liberal	William Chapple	13,296	54.6	+18.4
Unionist	Henry Keswick	11,055	45.4	−18.4
Majority		2,241	9.2	N/A
Turnout		24,351	73.5	+16.1
Registered electors		33,113		
Liberal gain from Unionist		Swing	+18.4	

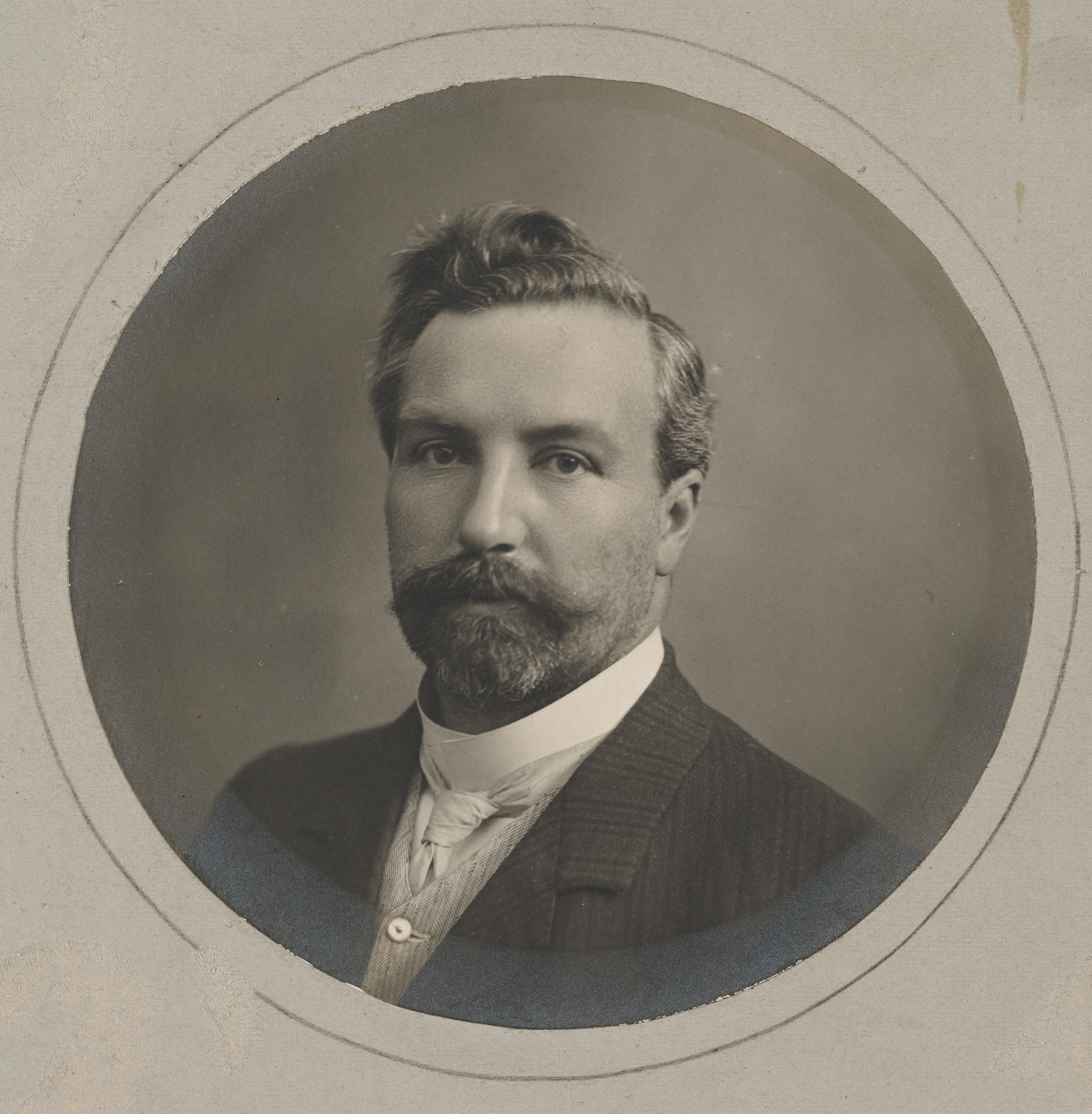
Chapple

General election 1923: Dumfriesshire
Party	Candidate	Votes	%	±%
Liberal	William Chapple	13,107	53.5	−1.1
Unionist	John Charteris	11,380	46.5	+1.1
Majority		1,727	7.0	−2.2
Turnout		24,487	72.6	−0.9
Registered electors		33,728		
Liberal hold		Swing	−1.1	

General election 1924: Dumfriesshire
Party	Candidate	Votes	%	±%
Unionist	John Charteris	12,718	46.2	−0.3
Liberal	William Chapple	8,472	30.8	−22.7
Labour	Agnes Dollan	6,342	23.0	New
Majority		4,246	15.4	N/A
Turnout		27,532	80.8	+8.2
Registered electors		34,079		
Unionist gain from Liberal		Swing	+11.2	

General election 1929: Dumfriesshire
Party	Candidate	Votes	%	±%
Liberal	Joseph Hunter	16,174	45.1	+14.3
Unionist	John Charteris	12,984	36.2	−10.0
Labour	W. H. Marwick	6,687	18.7	−4.3
Majority		3,190	8.9	N/A
Turnout		35,845	81.4	+0.6
Registered electors		44,050		
Liberal gain from Unionist		Swing	+12.2	

=== Elections in the 1930s ===
General election 1931: Dumfriesshire
Party	Candidate	Votes	%	±%
Liberal	Joseph Hunter	26,873	77.7	+32.6
Labour	J. S. Paterson	7,693	22.3	+3.6
Majority		19,180	55.4	+46.5
Turnout		34,566	77.6	−3.8
Liberal hold		Swing		

1935 Dumfriesshire by-election
Party	Candidate	Votes	%	±%
National Liberal	Henry Fildes	16,271	60.3	−17.4
Labour Co-op	John Downie	10,697	39.7	+17.4
Majority		5,574	20.6	−34.8
Turnout		26,968	58.7	−18.9
National Liberal gain from Liberal		Swing	−17.4	

General election 1935: Dumfriesshire
Party	Candidate	Votes	%	±%
National Liberal	Henry Fildes	22,053	65.4	+5.1
Labour Co-op	John Downie	11,685	34.6	−5.1
Majority		10,368	30.8	+10.2
Turnout		33,738	73.6	+14.9
National Liberal gain from Liberal		Swing	+5.1	

=== Elections in the 1940s ===
General election 1945: Dumfriesshire
Party	Candidate	Votes	%	±%
National Liberal	Niall Macpherson	16,465	47.4	−18.0
Labour Co-op	David Dunwoodie	12,388	35.7	+1.1
Liberal	Ian McColl	5,850	16.9	N/A
Majority		4,077	11.7	−16.9
Turnout		34,703	72.3	−1.3
National Liberal hold		Swing	-8.4	

=== Elections in the 1950s ===
General election 1950: Dumfries
Party	Candidate	Votes	%	±%
National Liberal	Niall Macpherson	26,268	59.31	
Labour	Harry S Wilson	18,025	40.69	
Majority		8,243	18.62	
Turnout		44,293	78.60	
National Liberal hold		Swing		

General election 1951: Dumfries
Party	Candidate	Votes	%	±%
National Liberal	Niall Macpherson	26,386	61.28	
Labour	George BA Douglas	16,669	38.72	
Majority		9,717	22.56	
Turnout		43,085	80.17	
National Liberal hold		Swing		

General election 1955: Dumfries
Party	Candidate	Votes	%	±%
National Liberal	Niall Macpherson	24,550	61.34	
Labour	Harry S Wilson	15,427	38.66	
Majority		9,078	22.68	
Turnout		39,977	73.73	
National Liberal hold		Swing		

General election 1959: Dumfries
Party	Candidate	Votes	%	±%
National Liberal	Niall Macpherson	25,867	58.39	
Labour	Graeme Moodie	18,437	41.61	
Majority		7,430	16.78	
Turnout		44,304	77.44	
National Liberal hold		Swing		

=== Elections in the 1960s ===
1963 Dumfriesshire by-election
Party	Candidate	Votes	%	±%
Unionist	David Anderson	16,762	40.84	−17.55
Labour	Iain Jordan	15,791	38.47	−3.14
Liberal	Charles Abernethy	4,491	10.94	N/A
SNP	John HD Gair	4,001	9.75	New
Majority		971	2.37	−14.41
Turnout		41,045		
Unionist hold		Swing		

General election 1964: Dumfries
Party	Candidate	Votes	%	±%
Unionist	Hector Monro	22,816	48.65	
Labour	Iain Jordan	18,360	39.15	
SNP	John HD Gair	5,726	12.21	N/A
Majority		4,456	9.50	
Turnout		46,902	81.57	
Unionist hold		Swing		

General election 1966: Dumfries
Party	Candidate	Votes	%	±%
Conservative	Hector Monro	20,779	45.63	
Labour	Christopher Boyd	16,358	35.92	
SNP	John HD Gair	5,727	12.57	
Liberal	Roy Semple	2,679	5.88	New
Majority		4,421	9.71	
Turnout		45,543	80.19	
Conservative hold		Swing		

=== Elections in the 1970s ===
General election 1970: Dumfries
Party	Candidate	Votes	%	±%
Conservative	Hector Monro	24,661	53.12	
Labour	Raymond David Donnelly	15,555	33.50	
SNP	John HD Gair	6,211	13.38	
Majority		9,106	19.62	
Turnout		46,427	76.13	
Conservative hold		Swing		

General election February 1974: Dumfries
Party	Candidate	Votes	%	±%
Conservative	Hector Monro	21,707	44.05	
Labour	John Wheatley	12,739	25.85	
SNP	LAB Whitley	9,186	18.64	
Liberal	DH Reive	5,642	11.45	New
Majority		8,968	18.20	
Turnout		49,274	80.38	
Conservative hold		Swing		

General election October 1974: Dumfries
Party	Candidate	Votes	%	±%
Conservative	Hector Monro	18,386	38.75	
Labour	John Wheatley	12,558	26.47	
SNP	LAB Whitley	12,542	26.43	
Liberal	A Sinclair	3,961	8.35	
Majority		5,828	12.28	
Turnout		47,447	76.71	
Conservative hold		Swing		

General election 1979: Dumfries
Party	Candidate	Votes	%	±%
Conservative	Hector Monro	22,704	45.2	+6.5
Labour	Alex Wood	13,700	27.3	+0.8
Liberal	Jim Wallace	7,169	14.3	+6.0
SNP	Ernest Gibson	6,647	13.2	−13.2
Majority		9,004	17.9	+5.6
Turnout		50,220	78.1	+1.4
Conservative hold		Swing		

=== Elections in the 1980s ===
General election 1983: Dumfries
Party	Candidate	Votes	%	±%
Conservative	Hector Monro	18,730	44.5	−0.7
SDP	James McCall	10,036	23.9	+9.6
Labour	Thomas McAughtrie	8,764	20.8	−6.5
SNP	Ernest Gibson	4,527	10.8	−2.4
Majority		8,694	20.6	+2.7
Turnout		42,057	73.0	−5.1
Conservative hold		Swing		

General election 1987: Dumfries
Party	Candidate	Votes	%	±%
Conservative	Hector Monro	18,785	41.9	−2.6
Labour	Catherine Phillips	11,292	25.2	+4.4
SDP	James McCall	8,064	18.0	−5.9
SNP	Thomas McAlpine	6,391	14.2	+3.4
Green	Paul Thomas	349	0.8	New
Majority		7,493	16.7	−3.9
Turnout		44,881	75.6	+2.6
Conservative hold		Swing		

=== Elections in the 1990s ===
General election 1992: Dumfries
Party	Candidate	Votes	%	±%
Conservative	Hector Monro	21,089	43.1	+1.2
Labour	Peter R. Rennie	14,674	30.0	+4.8
SNP	Alasdair Morgan	6,971	14.3	+0.1
Liberal Democrats	Neil C. Wallace	5,749	11.8	−6.2
Independent	Graham McLeod	312	0.6	New
Natural Law	Thomas Barlow	107	0.2	New
Majority		6,415	13.1	−3.6
Turnout		48,902	80.0	+3.4
Conservative hold		Swing		

General election 1997: Dumfries
Party	Candidate	Votes	%	±%
Labour	Russell Brown	23,528	47.5	+17.4
Conservative	Struan Stevenson	13,885	28.0	−15.1
SNP	Robert J. Higgins	5,977	12.1	−2.2
Liberal Democrats	Neil C. Wallace	5,487	11.1	−0.7
Referendum	David F. Parker	533	1.1	New
Natural Law	Elizabeth Hunter	117	0.2	0.0
Majority		9,643	19.5	N/A
Turnout		49,527	78.2	−1.8
Labour gain from Conservative		Swing	-16.2	

=== Elections in the 2000s ===
General election 2001: Dumfries
Party	Candidate	Votes	%	±%
Labour	Russell Brown	20,830	48.9	+1.4
Conservative	John Charteris	11,996	28.2	+0.2
Liberal Democrats	John Scott	4,955	11.6	+0.5
SNP	Gerard Fisher	4,103	9.6	−2.5
Scottish Socialist	John Dennis	702	1.6	New
Majority		8,834	20.7	+1.2
Turnout		42,586	67.0	−11.2
Labour hold		Swing		
