= Ruth Homan =

English educationist and women's welfare campaigner

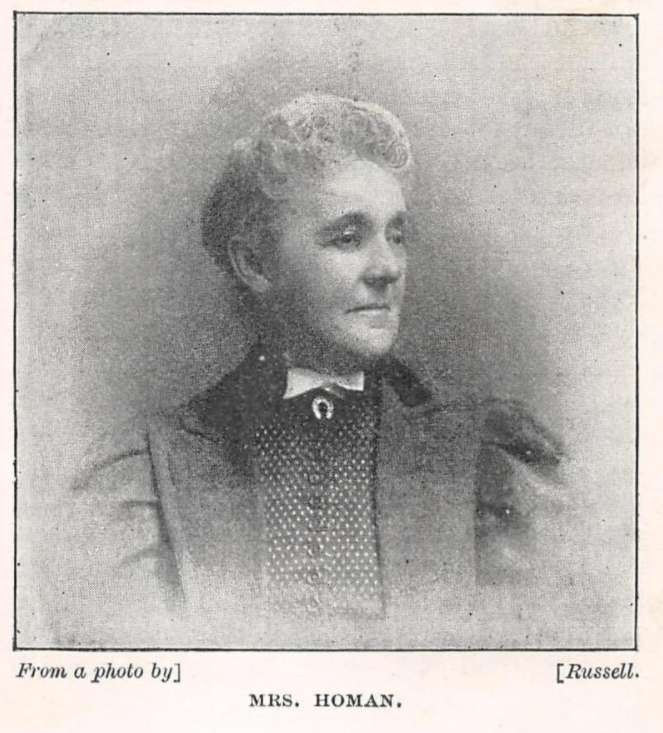
- Born: Ruth Waterlow; 8 August 1850; Hoxton, London
- Died: 6 November 1938 (aged 88); Cornwall
- Occupations: Educationist, Campaigner
- Organization(s): Union of Ethical Societies, London School Board, Women's Local Government Society
- Political party: Liberal Party
- Movement: Ethical Movement

Ruth Homan (8 August 1850 – 6 November 1938) was an educationist and women's welfare campaigner, who worked for many years on the London School Board. She was also active in Liberal politics, and a supporter of progressive social policies. The Women's Library, London holds a collection of Homan's scrapbooks and albums.

== Life ==
Ruth Homan was born in Hoxton, London to Sir Sydney Waterlow, a philanthropist and politician, and Anna Maria (née Hickson). In 1873, she married Francis Wilkes Homan, but was widowed in 1880. The couple had one daughter, Winifred. Winifred lived with her mother at Fairseat, Tintagel, until she married Philip Stephens.

== Work for the London School Board ==
Her family had been politically active, and friends of her father included Thomas Henry Huxley. When she ran for the London School Board in 1891, she had prepared herself through stints as a school manager, a probationer at St Bartholomew's Hospital, and with the Country Holidays Fund (a charity). She also took cooking classes at the South Kensington School of Cookery. She was elected to the School Board as the representative for Tower Hamlets, and held the role until the School Board was abolished in 1903.

A supporter of the Liberal Party and advocate of progressive policies, Homan "endorsed the development of the higher grade and evening continuation schools, the teaching of temperance principles in board school, and special teaching for 'afflicted' and delicate children." In addition to her work on the School Board, she was prominent in other charitable organisations, including the Poplar Board School Children's Boot and Clothing Help Society and the London Schools Dinners Association. Homan was also a member of council of the Women's Industrial Council, a vice-president of the Pupil-Teachers Association, and a member of a Club of Working Girls in the city.

Homan was president of the Cornish Union of Women's Liberal Associations, as well as of the Hammersmith Women's Liberal Association. Alongside other liberal, upper-middle class London women, she was a member of the feminist Women's Local Government Society (WLGS).

From 1910, for 11 years, Homan served as a Poor Law Guardian for Ewell, Surrey.

== The Ethical Movement ==
With Stanton Coit, Leslie Stephen, and Corrie Grant, Ruth Homan was a founding member of the West London Ethical Society in 1892, one of the formative bodies of the Union of Ethical Societies (which became Humanists UK). The West London Ethical Society, part of the early Ethical movement in the UK, appealed:

To those who have no longer a place in established religious organisations, but who yet consider that there is as good need as ever for the exposition and inculcation of the meaning and worth of the moral and inward life... to provide a centre where those who share that conviction may regularly meet, listen to, and exchange thoughts on the themes that concern human wellbeing in the widest and highest sense, unhampered by tradition and conventions that have spent their force.

== Death ==
After the death of her husband Ruth Homan moved to Tintagel where she built a large house called Fairseat after her childhood home in London.

Towards the end of her life, Ruth Homan lived in Cornwall, where she was president of the Tintagel Nursing Association and her local branch of the Women's Institute. She also established the village's social hall. She died on 6 November 1938 and was cremated at Plymouth Crematorium.
