= 1963 Dumfriesshire by-election =

1963 UK parliamentary by-election

A 1963 by-election for the UK parliament constituency of Dumfriesshire was held on 12 December 1963, after the sitting MP, Niall Macpherson, was elevated to the peerage as Lord Drumalbyn. Macpherson had been elected in 1959 as a National Liberal and Unionist, the latter label being that used by Conservatives in Scotland at this time. Macpherson had first been elected as a National Liberal in 1945. At the last election Macpherson had polled over 58% of the votes cast in a two-way fight against a Labour candidate and gaining a majority of 7,430 votes.

The by-election was won by David Anderson who retained it for the Conservatives, by only 971 votes, a sign that the Conservative government was losing support. Anderson stood down at the 1964 general election, only serving as an MP for less than a year.

== Result ==
Anderson was confident of victory. On polling day The Glasgow Herald reported that Anderson refused "to contemplate not winning" and that his bags were "packed for Westminster". He predicted he would have a majority of between 3,000 and 8,000, describing a majority of 2,000 "as sink bottom". He had even accepted an engagement to open a Christmas fair as an MP the following week. However the Labour candidate Iain Jordan thought he would beat Anderson into second place while Liberal Charles Abernethy thought it would be a close three-way fight between himself, Anderson and Jordan – in contrast Anderson thought Abernethy could lose his deposit and finish behind the Scottish National Party candidate, John Gair. Gair himself hoped to finish ahead of the Liberals and was pleased that he had faced an absence of hostility during the campaign.

By-election 1963: Dumfriesshire
Party	Candidate	Votes	%	±%
Unionist	David Anderson	16,762	40.84	−17.55
Labour	Iain Jordan	15,791	38.47	−3.14
Liberal	Charles Abernethy	4,491	10.94	N/A
SNP	John HD Gair	4,001	9.75	New
Majority		971	2.37	−14.41
Turnout		41,045		
Unionist hold		Swing		

== Aftermath ==
While Anderson did retain the seat for the Unionists, his majority was very noticeably reduced and far less than his pre-poll prediction. The Glasgow Herald noted that even in 1945 the victorious National Liberal candidate had had a majority of over 4000. Anderson claimed that while the result did not produce such a large majority as previously it was satisfactory and noted it was the first time since 1945 that the election had not been a straight fight between a Labour candidate and a candidate backed by the Conservatives and National Liberals. He also claimed out it was the first time in 40 years that a Unionist had fought for the seat on a 'straight ticket' (i.e. without using the National Liberal label).

The unsuccessful Labour candidate, Iain Jordan, claimed the result was a vote of no confidence in the government. This sentiment was echoed by Len Williams, the General Secretary of the Labour Party who stated the result was "another great blow for the Tories. Yet another of their safe seats becomes marginal."

At the general election the following year, the seat was held for the Conservatives by new candidate Hector Monro with a majority of 4,456 votes.
