= The Improved Industrial Dwellings Company =

Improved Industrial Dwellings Company
- Company type: Public
- Industry: Housing
- Founded: London, UK (1863)
- Founder: Sydney Waterlow
- Headquarters: London
- Products: Model dwellings

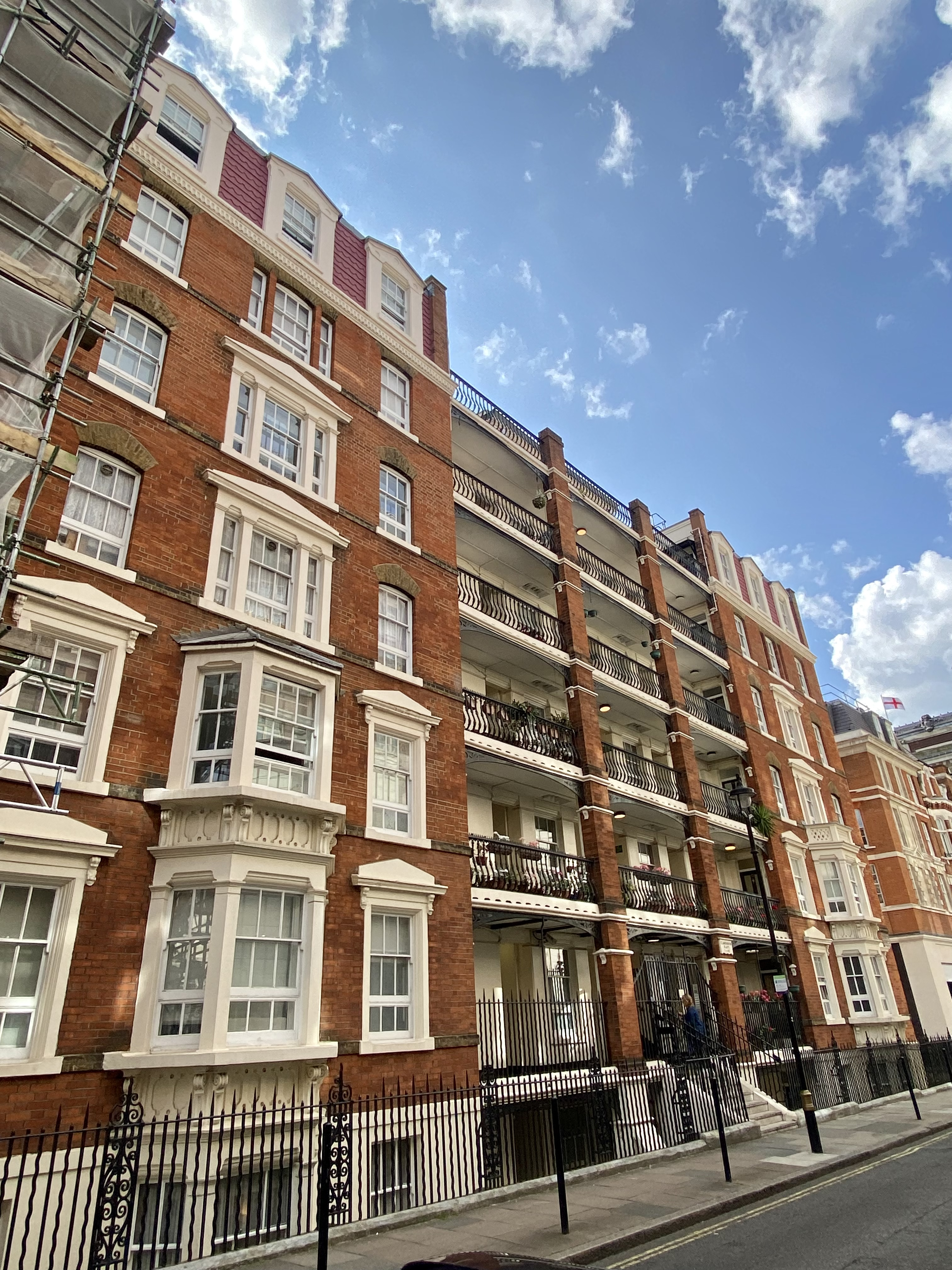
The Clarendon Buildings on Balderton Street, Mayfair. Built by the IIDC in 1872.

The Improved Industrial Dwellings Company (IIDC) was a Victorian Model dwellings company founded in 1863 by the printer, philanthropist and later Lord Mayor of London Sir Sydney Waterlow. The company operated predominantly in Central London as a provider of block dwellings for the working classes, employing a strict selection and discipline regime amongst its tenants to ensure a healthy return on investment. Starting with a capital of £50,000, the IIDC became one of the largest and most successful of the model dwellings companies, housing at its height around 30,000 individuals.

Waterlow's example was influential. The Newcastle Upon Tyne Improved Industrial Dwellings Company was set up by James Hall of Hall Brothers Steamship Company, Tynemouth, after visiting Sir Sydney Waterlow's establishment in London.

== Buildings ==
Waterlow worked with the builder Matthew Allen, choosing not to use an architect. Blocks built by the IIDC include:

- Marlborough Buildings, Chelsea
- Huntingdon Buildings, Bethnal Green
- Leopold Buildings, Bethnal Green
- Sandringham Buildings, Charing Cross
- Cromwell Buildings, Southwark
- Langbourn Buildings, Finsbury
- Clarendon Flats, Mayfair
- Cobden Buildings, Kings Cross Road, Islington (1865)
- Ambrosden Avenue, Devil's Acre, Westminster
- Derby Buildings, Britannia Street, Camden
- Old Tower Buildings, Brewhouse Lane, Wapping (1864)
- Compton Buildings, Finsbury (1871)
- New Tower Buildings, Wapping High Street, Wapping (1886)

There were others in Old St Pancras Road, Wapping, Greenwich and Islington.

== See also ==
- List of existing model dwellings
