= Alves dos Reis =

Portuguese fraudster

Artur Alves Reis
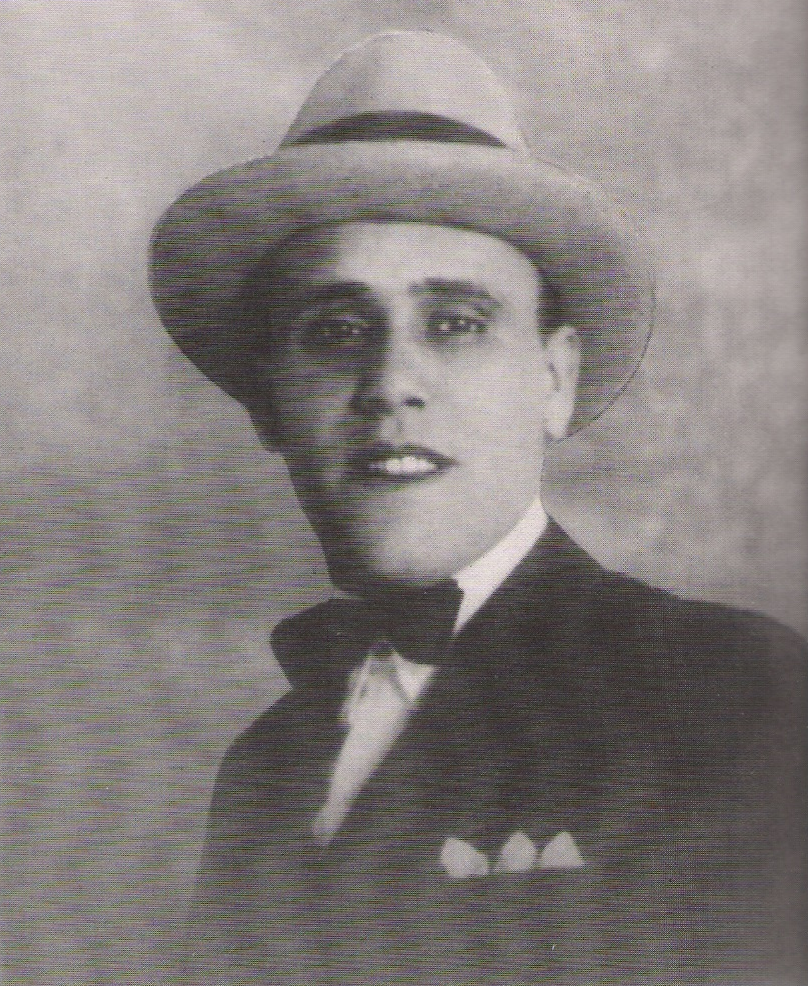
- Alves Reis, c. 1925
- Born: Artur Virgílio Alves Reis; 8 September 1896; Lisbon, Kingdom of Portugal
- Died: 9 July 1955 (aged 58); Lisbon, Portugal
- Known for: Bank fraud

Artur Virgílio Alves Reis (Note: The surname was "Alves Reis", even though the form "Alves dos Reis" is commonplace.) (Lisbon, 8 September 1896 – 9 July 1955) was a Portuguese criminal who perpetrated one of the largest frauds in history, against the Bank of Portugal in 1925, often called the Angola e Metrópole affair. At a point, he had duplicated 1% of the Portuguese GDP, leading to the collapse of the country's financial system. He was tried in May 1930, convicted and sentenced to 20 years in prison, where he converted to Protestantism. He was released in May 1945, and died of a heart attack in 1955.

== Early life ==
Alves Reis was a child of a humble family; his father was a financially troubled undertaker who ended up being declared insolvent. Reis wanted to study engineering. He started his degree but quit in the first year to marry Maria Luísa Jacobetti de Azevedo, sister of Octávio Jacobetti de Azevedo and daughter of de Azevedo and Beatriz, in August 1916. In 1916, he decided to emigrate to Portuguese Angola, at the time a Portuguese colony, to try to make a fortune and escape the humiliations from his wife's family, due to their differences in social status. Before departing to Angola, Reis forged himself a diploma from Oxford University's "Polytechnic School of Engineering", a department that did not exist. He supposedly studied engineering sciences, geology, geometry, physics, metallurgy, pure mathematics, paleography, electric and mechanical engineering and applied mechanics. He started as a public employee in the public sewers constructions and repairs.

== The Ambaca affair ==
In 1922, Ambaca, a railway company operating in Angola, was in financial crisis. Debt and shareholders were uneasy and the company's shares had fallen to a few escudos each. Alves Reis realized that the Portuguese government had lent the company's treasury $100,000 in an attempt to bail it out. He quickly forged checks from his bank account in New York and bought the company with them. While the checks were travelling by sea (a voyage that took weeks) he transferred the money in the company's treasury to his bank account and thus the checks were cleared even though he did not have sufficient liquidity at the beginning. He used the remaining money in an attempt to take over the Angola Mining Company, though he was found out before he could take total control of the company and was arrested in July 1924 in Porto for embezzling the Ambaca money. He was arrested for 54 days and was released on 27 August 1924 because of a technicality; he blamed a criminal conspiracy for his arrest.

== Banco de Portugal plot ==
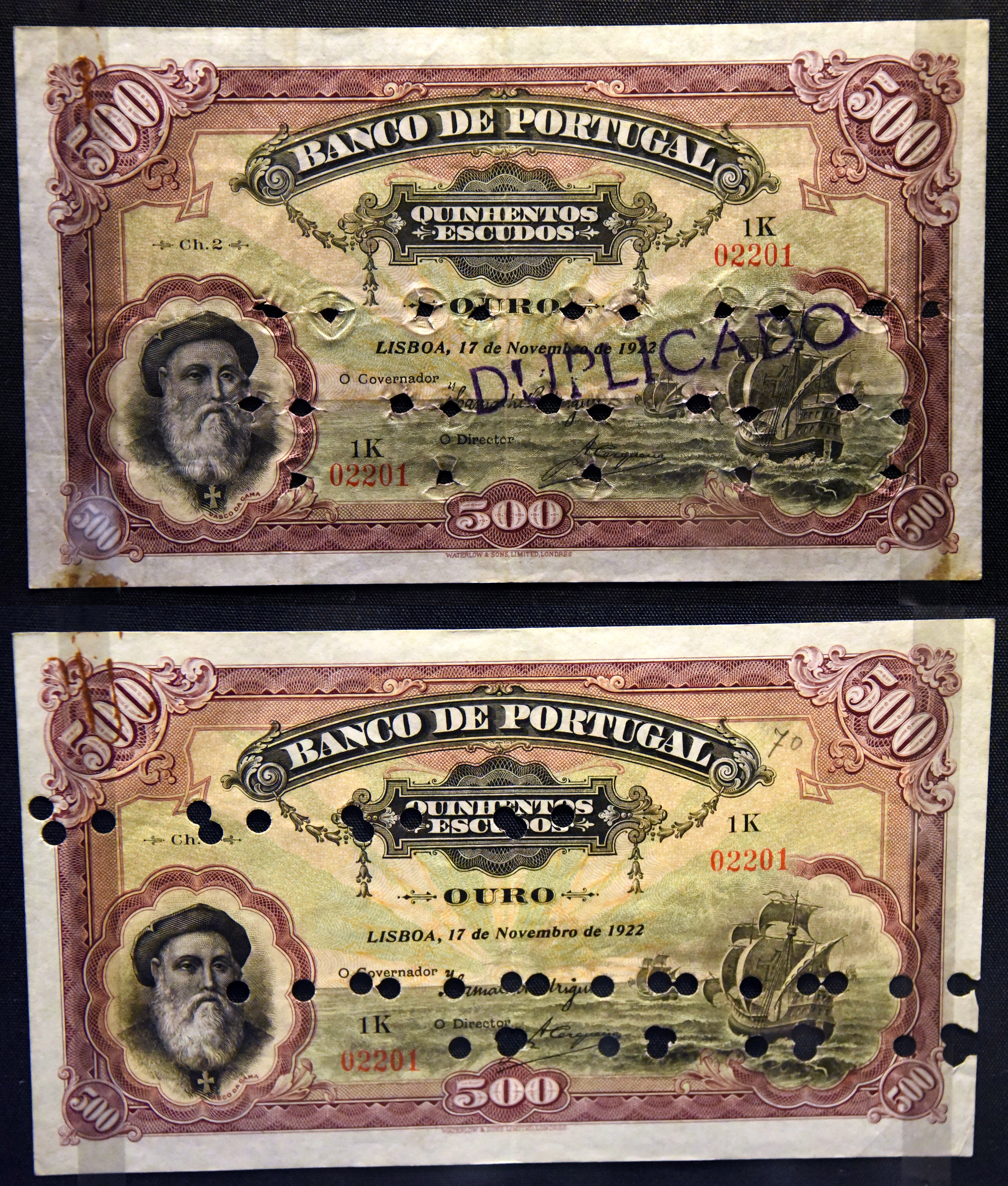
Counterfeit 500 escudo note (upper) and a genuine banknote (lower) of Banco de Portugal. Both carry the same serial number of 1K 02201, 1922. On display at the British Museum in London

During his time in jail, Reis conceived of what became known as the Portugal Bank Note Affair. It consisted of forging a contract in the name of Banco de Portugal (Bank of Portugal) —the central bank, responsible for issuing banknotes and partly private at the time—authorizing him to print banknotes in return for an alleged loan from a consortium to develop Angola. His plan was to use the contract to convince a legitimate banknote printing contractor to make the notes, thereby obtaining notes that would be indistinguishable from those legitimately authorized by the bank.

In 1924, Reis asked business contacts of his to assist him in his "confidential mission" for the Governors of the Bank of Portugal. Reis wrote up the fraudulent contract and had it officially notarized by an assistant notary who was too casual and trusting to read it. Taking advantage of a similarly lazy approach among diplomatic staffs, he acquired three certifications for the notarization in the embassies of Britain, Germany (Weimar Republic) and France (French Third Republic). Then he rewrote the contract with a French translation, forged the signatures of Bank of Portugal officials (he traced them from the currency in his pocket) and affixed the notarizations, and two new bills as samples, to the contract.

The key to Reis's plan was that only he knew that the contract was forged; trading on the period's widespread cynicism about the monetary policies of governments and on Portugal's reputation for corruption and self-dealing, he convinced the others who assisted in his operation that what they were doing had the clandestine support of the Bank. Reis' key associates, Dutch trader Karel Marang van Ysselveere, German trader Adolph Hennies, and José Bandeira (brother of António Bandeira, the Portuguese Ambassador to the Netherlands) later claimed to have believed the project was legitimate throughout. Reis had been lucky or fortunate in his selection of associates; although currently legitimate, each man had checkered pasts and had no objections to engaging in an enterprise that was technically legal even if shady, especially if it involved such major insiders. Reis alone knew unquestionably that there were no insiders and his various documents were worthless, though prosecutors and journalists later suggested that the continuing credulity of his associates as the scheme progressed strained belief.

On the pretext that the supposed loan and issuance would be politically unpopular, and with the implication that it was a bit of sharp practice by bank insiders, the entire operation was conducted in an atmosphere of deep secrecy. It was vital, Reis emphasized to his contractors from Lisbon, that the matter be kept quite confidential to avoid embarrassing their prominent silent partners and risking the whole deal being scotched in the face of political opposition.

Karel Marang approached Joh. Enschedé, an old and respected Dutch printing firm for the job. Reviewing the attached sample notes, they said they were the work of Waterlow and Sons Limited of London, a British printer almost as old and eminent. Since the contract insisted that the new notes be identical to the existing issue, the Dutch firm suggested that Marang take the job to Waterlow since they already had the plates and it was almost impossible to reproduce plates exactly. On 4 December 1924, Marang approached Sir William Waterlow with a letter of introduction from the Joh. Enschedé company. Marang explained that for political reasons the contract required utmost discretion and promised that Waterlow would shortly receive appropriate documentation from Lisbon.

When Waterlow received letters that authorized the printing—more of Reis's forgeries —, he accepted the contract. Reis had managed to work out the sequence of bank governor names and serial numbers used by the Portuguese central bank, but had neglected to eliminate numbers already ordered. When Waterlow realized that the bills had the same numbers as some they had previously printed, they alerted the "bank" (actually Reis). He also wrote a letter to the governor of the Bank of Portugal, Inocêncio Camacho Rodrigues, in which he talked about the contracts with Marang, but the letter was lost in the mail. Since the contract had specified that the word "Angola" would be overprinted on the new notes when they reached Lisbon and before transport to Angola (they were allegedly for colonial circulation only), it was not difficult for Reis to convince the London firm that the reuse of existing serial numbers was not a cause for alarm.

=== Result and impact ===
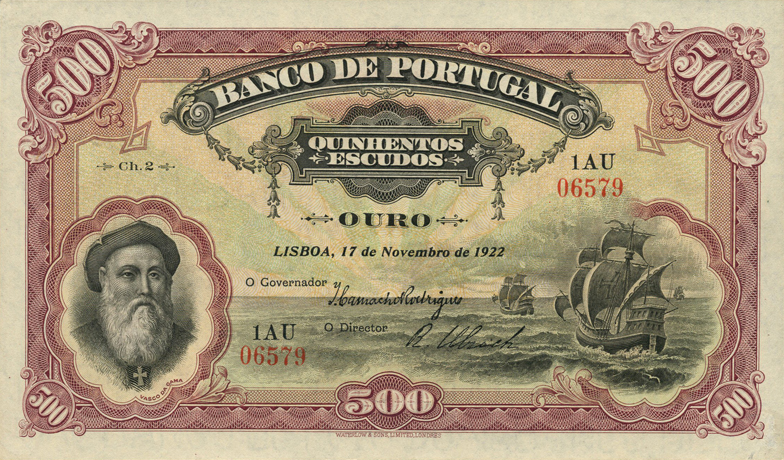
One of the fraudulent banknotes

Waterlow and Sons Limited printed 200,000 banknotes of 500 Portuguese escudos with an image of Vasco da Gama, with the date of 17 November 1922, to a total face value of 100 million escudos (which was equivalent to 0.88% of Portugal's nominal GDP at the time). There were almost as many false 500 escudos banknotes as real ones. The first delivery was made in February 1925, one year after the real 500 escudo banknotes with the image of Vasco da Gama began to circulate. The notes were transported from England to Portugal with the help of Reis's accomplices, José Bandeira, who would use the diplomatic advantages of his brother, and Karel Marang, who held a diplomatic passport issued by Liberia. Reis then proceeded to launder the bills into gold-backed foreign currencies and smaller denominations of Portuguese currency.

Reis himself received 25% of the proceeds of his scheme, which made him very wealthy. Maintaining always the internal fiction that they were acting for the government, he reminded his partners of their moral obligations to Angola. Together they created the "Bank of Angola & Metropole" in June 1925, with Bandeira at the helm, both to aid in circulation of their bills and to invest in projects in both Portugal and Angola. By illegally increasing the monetary base and investing heavily in currency, land, building and businesses, he and Bandeira created a boom in the Portuguese economy. Reis bought the "Palace of the Golden Boy" (Palácio do Menino de Ouro, nowadays the building of the British Council in Lisbon), three farms and a taxi fleet, and spent an enormous quantity of money on jewellery and expensive clothing for his wife. José Bandeira bought retail shops and invested in all manner of enterprises; he also sought, unsuccessfully, to purchase the newspaper Diário de Notícias. In the fall of 1925, Reis and Hennies made a tour of Angola, buying properties, investing in corporations, and making development plans. He was hailed there as a savior and as "Portugal's own Cecil Rhodes".

The final phase of Reis' scheme was to buy a controlling interest in the Bank of Portugal, a step which would allow him to retroactively make his fiction about Bank approval true. With control of the bank, the entire counterfeiting could be swept under the rug, ensuring that there would never be any evidence of the fraud. During the summer and fall of 1925, while he and Hennies toured Angola, he had Bandeira and his own assistant Francisco Ferreira, Jr. ferreting out the ownership of the Bank shares (it was secret) and buying them under the complicated rules that the Bank's charter allowed. Eventually they controlled 10,000 of the 45,000 shares needed for controlling interest in the bank, but publicity led Bandeira to ease off the purchases even as he sent Reis ever more inflated false reports of the number of shares they had acquired.

=== Discovery and arrest ===
Throughout 1925 rumours of fake banknotes arose, but they could not be detected: the notes Reis had released were not counterfeit as such, but real — although unauthorized — Bank of Portugal bills.

Although the issuing of unauthorised banknotes went undetected, the attempts by Reis and his partners to make good their fictitious obligations to Angola attracted attention for other reasons. The Portuguese had long suspected the German government of coveting their Angola colony. The prominent role of Hennies in the bank and Reis' triumphal return to Angola caused suspicion because of Hennies's well-established relationship with Germany's espionage apparatus during World War I. The acquisition of large tracts of plantation land by Angola and Metropole alarmed Alfredo de Silva, who controlled Portugal's market in vegetable oils. De Silva's friend and business associate Pereira da Rosa (who himself sat on the boards of banks that had been losing business to the Angola & Metropole) owned O Século (Portuguese for "The Century"), the most important daily newspaper at the time and one that was concerned at the prospect of a deep-pocketed owner for the competing Diário de Notícias. The newspaper assigned its top reporters to dig into the bank and Reis, beginning a campaign of aspersion and innuendo.

Journalists asked how it was possible that Reis's bank, Banco de Angola e Metrópole, gave loans with low interest rates without the need of receiving deposits. It was implied that the bank was a German front aimed at infiltrating the country and gaining control of the Angolan colony. The campaign, filled with insinuation and calls for investigation, made public the fact that the Inspector of Banking Commerce had opened an investigation shortly before the newspaper's crusade began. The inspector's inquiry was into the attempts by people associated with the Angola & Metropole to buy up shares of the Bank of Portugal. The revelation of the effort added fuel to the dark suspicions that then hung around the Angola & Metropole and its backers.

On 4 December 1925, a teller for a foreign-exchange firm in Porto who had been following all the allegations and revelations in the press suddenly had a flash of insight and became convinced that the Angola & Metropole must be counterfeiting. The teller had an advantage on other observers: his employer was one of Reis' half-unwitting launderers. The Angola & Metropole illegally bought foreign exchange from him at a premium (money exchange was illegal in Portugal at the time, but in fact widespread and tolerated). The ledgers of these transactions were then torn out and destroyed. Although neither the teller nor the officials at the Porto branch of the Bank of Portugal could find any evidence that the bills from the Angola & Metropole were counterfeit, the circumstances were suspicious enough that the allegation was reported to Lisbon.

O Século publicly revealed the fraud on 5 December 1925. The day before, the Bank of Portugal had sent the inspector João Teixeira Direito, to Porto, to investigate the huge deposits by the Banco de Angola e Metrópole in banknotes of 500 escudos at the foreign-exchange firm Pinto da Cunha. After exhaustive and frustrating investigation, they finally noticed, by chance, banknotes with duplicate serial numbers. Authorities ordered all bank agencies to store their notes by order of serial number to detect duplicates; many more were found. The Bank of Portugal contacted Waterlow and Sons, and Reis's scheme fell apart.

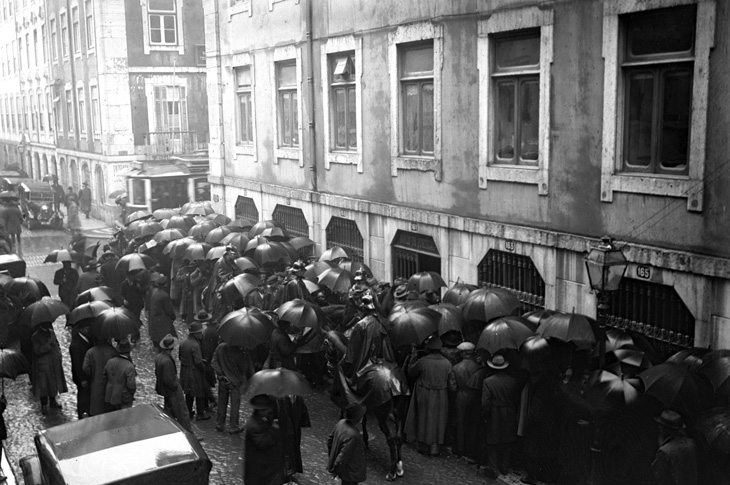
Crowds rush to the Bank of Portugal building in Lisbon, to exchange the fraudulent banknotes (8 December 1925)

On 6 December, Reis's bank's wealth was confiscated and arrest warrants were issued for him and most of his associates. Reis and Hennies were on board the Adolph Woerman en route to Portugal from Angola and were tipped off that they were to be arrested when they made harbour. Hennies slipped away and managed to elude capture; he changed his identity and was able to keep most of his share. Despite Hennies's pleading, Reis refused to run and insisted on returning to Lisbon to defend himself. He was arrested a few days later. He was 28 years old.

In the following trial, Reis's forged documents, and widespread cynicism about the nation's elites, were convincing enough for judges to suspect that Bank of Portugal officials and others in the government and establishment might really be involved. This delayed the sentence for five years, but Reis was finally tried in May 1930. He was convicted and sentenced to 20 years in prison. In prison, Reis converted to Protestantism and converted other prisoners. He was released in May 1945, and was offered, but refused, a job as a bank employee. Reis died of a heart attack in 1955.

=== Fate of principal accomplices ===
Bandeira received a sentence of 15 years, served it, and upon release, briefly went into the nightclub business. He died in late March 1960 in Lisbon, a well-liked man of modest means.

Marang was tried in the Netherlands and sentenced to 11 months. He left the country rather than serve prison time. He later purchased a small electrical manufacturer in France, eventually becoming a respected manufacturer, family man, and French citizen. He turned over management of the prosperous firm to his sons and died at his vacation home in Cannes on February 13, 1960.

Hennies fled to Germany and reappeared later under his real name, Hans Döring. He lived high for some time but eventually lost much of his wealth on poor investments. Turning over all his assets to a trusted friend, he later found it impossible to reclaim them and lived in near poverty. On August 29, 1936, he died in disputed circumstances while in a Berlin hospital.

=== Repercussions ===
Reis's fraud had enormous repercussions on the economy and politics of Portugal. By the end of 1925, Reis had managed to introduce escudo banknotes worth £1,007,963 (at 1925 exchange rates: £53 million in modern pounds) into the Portuguese economy. The exchange rate of the Portuguese escudo fell and it lost much of its credibility. After the scheme was found out, the Bank of Portugal ordered the withdrawal of all 500 escudo banknotes within 20 days; by 26 December 115,000 counterfeit notes were withdrawn.

When Reis's fraud became public knowledge in December 1925 it brought about a crisis of confidence in the Portuguese government. Although events of this period are still little understood, this crisis had a strong effect on the nationalist military 28th May 1926 coup d'état against the Portuguese First Republic government and President Bernardino Machado that brought the Ditadura Nacional (National Dictatorship) to power, heralding the Estado Novo dictatorship from 1926 to 1974, with António de Oliveira Salazar ruling from 1932 to 1968.

Banco de Portugal sued Waterlow & Sons in the High Court in London. In one of the most complex trials in English legal history, the case was finally settled in the House of Lords on 28 April 1932 in favour of the Banco de Portugal, which was awarded £610,392 in damages.

Waterlow & Sons' business never completely recovered; it was finally acquired by De La Rue in 1961. Sir William Waterlow had been dismissed as president of the printing house and was elected Lord Mayor of London in 1929. He died of peritonitis on 6 July 1931 before the final judgment of the House of Lords.

== In popular culture ==
The fraud was the subject of the 1974 Italian TV miniseries Accadde a Lisbona ("It happened in Lisbon"); Reis was played by Paolo Stoppa.

It was also the subject of the 1991 episode "Duplikát" of the Czechoslovak-West German TV series Dobrodružství kriminalistiky ("Adventures in Criminology"). Reis was portrayed by Jan Teplý.

In 2000, Alves dos Reis' life was depicted in a 50-episode Portuguese television series written by former Polícia Judiciária investigator Francisco Moita Flores, with the full title Alves Reis, Um Seu Criado ("Alves Reis, At Your Service") and broadcast by RTP1.

A movie directed by Thomas Napper, starring James Nelson-Joyce in the role of Alves Reis, is currently in production, slated to be released in 2027, with the title "The Man Who Stole Portugal".

== See also ==
- Stavisky affair, a financial and political scandal in France in 1934 that led to government resignations and a crisis in the French Third Republic.
