= George Gustavus Walker =

Scottish Conservative politician and militia officer

Colonel Sir George Gustavus Walker
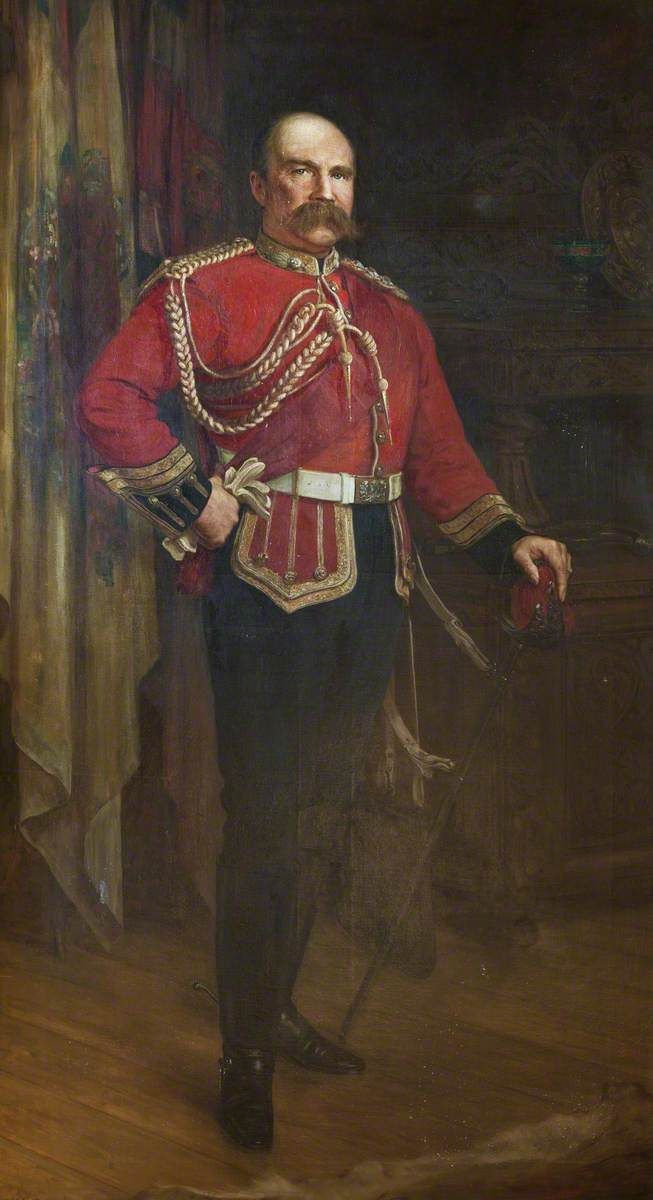
- Portrait by William Clarke Wontner

Member of Parliament for Dumfriesshire
- In office 1865–1868
- Preceded by: John Hope-Johnstone
- Succeeded by: Sydney Waterlow
- In office 1869–1874
- Preceded by: Sydney Waterlow
- Succeeded by: John Hope-Johnstone

Personal details
- Born: 18 January 1830
- Died: 5 August 1897 (aged 67)
- Party: Conservative
- Spouse: Anne Murray Lennock
- Education: Balliol College, Oxford

Colonel Sir George Gustavus Walker KCB JP DL (18 January 1830 – 5 August 1897) was a Scottish Conservative politician, militia officer and landowner. He sat as Member of Parliament for Dumfriesshire from 1865 to 1868 and again from 1869 to 1874. He commanded the 3rd Battalion of the King's Own Scottish Borderers, served as aide-de-camp to Queen Victoria, was convenor of the county of Dumfries from 1889 to 1894, and was appointed KCB in 1892. As a landowner he held Crawfordton in Dumfriesshire, where Crawfordton House was built for him in 1865, and the Corrour estate in the central Highlands until its sale to Sir John Stirling-Maxwell in 1891.

== Early life and education ==
Walker was the only surviving son of John Walker of Crawfordton, Dumfriesshire, and Loch Treig, Inverness-shire, and his wife Jessy, daughter of John Johnstone. He was educated at Rugby School and Balliol College, Oxford, graduating B.A. in 1851 and M.A. in 1855.

== Parliamentary career ==
Walker was elected Conservative Member of Parliament for Dumfriesshire at the 1865 general election, succeeding John Hope-Johnstone. He lost the seat at the 1868 general election to the Liberal candidate Sydney Waterlow, but regained it the following year at a by-election after Waterlow was disqualified for becoming a government contractor. Walker held the seat until standing down at the 1874 general election, when he was succeeded by another Hope-Johnstone, John Hope-Johnstone the younger.

== County and military service ==
Outside Parliament Walker held several county offices. He served as a justice of the peace and deputy lieutenant for Dumfriesshire, a deputy lieutenant for Inverness-shire, and a justice of the peace for the Stewartry of Kirkcudbright. Art UK identifies him as convenor of the county of Dumfries from 1889 to 1894.

His military career was in the militia. From 1873 he was lieutenant-colonel commandant of the 3rd Battalion of the King's Own Scottish Borderers, and he was promoted full colonel in 1883. In 1884, after the death of the Duke of Buccleuch, Walker was appointed aide-de-camp to Queen Victoria, an appointment which the regimental history described as an honour both to him and to the battalion. He held the aide-de-camp role until 1892, the year in which he was appointed Knight Commander of the Order of the Bath on 10 May.

== Estates ==
=== Crawfordton ===
Walker's principal seat was Crawfordton House in Dumfriesshire, built for him in 1865 and designed by the Edinburgh architectural firm of Peddie & Kinnear. Historic Environment Scotland describes the house as a Scottish Baronial mansion and lists it as a Category B listed building.

=== Corrour ===
Walker inherited the Corrour estate in the central Highlands in 1857. Historic Environment Scotland links the estate's later development to the growth of Highland field sports, including the construction of a shooting lodge and the leasing of sporting rights. Walker sold Corrour and the neighbouring Fersit estate to Sir John Stirling-Maxwell in 1891.

== Family and death ==
Walker married Anne Murray Lennock, the only daughter of Admiral George Gustavus Lennock, in 1856. They had three sons and seven daughters; their daughter Ethel Mary Walker became the second wife of the Liberal politician Edward Knatchbull-Hugessen, 1st Baron Brabourne.

Walker died on 5 August 1897.

Parliament of the United Kingdom
Preceded by John Hope-Johnstone	Member of Parliament for Dumfriesshire; 1865 – 1868	Succeeded by Sydney Waterlow
Preceded by Sydney Waterlow	Member of Parliament for Dumfriesshire; 1869 – 1874	Succeeded by John Hope-Johnstone
