= Hector Monro, Baron Monro of Langholm =

British politician (1922–2006)

The Right Honourable The Lord Monro of Langholm AE PC

Under-Secretary of State for Scotland
- In office 14 April 1992 – 6 July 1995
- Prime Minister: John Major
- Preceded by: The 2nd Baron Strathclyde
- Succeeded by: The 16th Earl of Lindsay
- In office 28 July 1971 – 4 March 1974
- Prime Minister: Edward Heath
- Preceded by: Teddy Taylor
- Succeeded by: Robert Hughes

Minister for Sport
- In office 4 May 1979 – 14 September 1981
- Prime Minister: Margaret Thatcher
- Preceded by: Denis Howell
- Succeeded by: Neil Macfarlane

Member of Parliament for Dumfries
- In office 15 October 1964 – 8 April 1997
- Preceded by: David Anderson
- Succeeded by: Russell Brown

90th President of the Scottish Rugby Union
- In office 1976–1977
- Preceded by: John Henry Orr
- Succeeded by: Frank Coutts

Member of the House of Lords
- Lord Temporal
- Life peerage 6 November 1997 – 30 August 2006

Personal details
- Born: Hector Seymour Peter Monro; 4 October 1922 Edinburgh, Scotland, UK
- Died: 30 August 2006 (aged 83) Dumfries, Scotland, UK
- Party: Conservative
- Spouse(s): Anne Welch (1949 –1994); Doris Kaestner (1994 –2006)
- Children: 2 Sons
- Education: King's College, Cambridge

Hector Seymour Peter Monro, Baron Monro of Langholm, AE, PC (4 October 1922 – 30 August 2006), was a Scottish Conservative and Unionist Party politician. He was Member of Parliament for Dumfriesshire for over 32 years, from 1964 to 1997, and then a life peer in the House of Lords.

After piloting flying boats in the Second World War, Monro became a farmer in his native Dumfriesshire. He became active in local test politics in the 1950s, and was elected as MP for Dumfries in 1964. He served as a Conservative whip and held three junior ministerial positions, twice in the Scottish Office and once as Minister for Sport in the Department for the Environment. He became a member of the House of Lords in 1997, after he stood down from the House of Commons. He was particularly concerned with Scottish and rural issues, the RAF, and sport, and was noted for his strong links with his constituency. He was in office at the time of the Lockerbie Disaster in 1988, which occurred in his constituency.

== Early and private life ==
Monro was born in Edinburgh and raised at Craigcleuch near Langholm in Dumfriesshire. His father, Alistair Monro, was a captain in the Cameron Highlanders; his maternal grandfather was Lieutenant General Sir Spencer Ewart. Monro was educated at Upland House School in Sussex, Canford School in Dorset, and King's College, Cambridge.

He was a member of the Cambridge University Air Squadron at Cambridge. After only one year at Cambridge, he joined the RAF in 1941, becoming a flight lieutenant in Coastal Command, flying Atlantic patrols in Short Sunderland flying boats and then in the Far East in Catalinas.

After he was demobbed in 1946, he became a farmer at Kirtlebridge near Lockerbie, although he also had other business interests. He remained a member of the Royal Auxiliary Air Force from 1947 to 1954. He was later an honorary Air Commodore from 1982 to 2000, and its honorary Inspector General from 1990 to 2000.

Monro married twice. He married Anne Welch in 1949. Their two sons joined the British Army. Seymour retired as a major-general; Hughie is a retired brigadier. Monro's first wife died in 1994; later that year, he married a second time, to Doris Kaestner, a friend of his first wife. Monro's grandson, Ander Monro, has played for the Canada national rugby union team.

== Political career ==
Monro was elected as a Dumfries County Councillor from 1952, where he served until 1967. He was chairman and vice-president of the Dumfries Unionist Party and was elected MP for Dumfries in the 1964 general election, retaining his seat until he retired at the 1997 general election.

He became a Conservative whip in 1968, and was a Parliamentary Under Secretary of State at the Scottish Office between 28 July 1971 and 28 February 1974. He voted against his party on Scottish devolution, announcing his support for a Scottish Assembly in 1974.

After the Conservatives lost the February 1974 general election, he was an opposition spokesman, initially on Scottish affairs and then on sport, until 1979. After the 1979 general election, he was appointed as Margaret Thatcher's first Minister for Sport, as Parliamentary Under Secretary of State at the Department of the Environment under Michael Heseltine. He also had responsibility for some environmental issues, and was involved in strengthening the provisions of the Wildlife and Countryside Act 1981.

Monro came under some criticism for opposing the visit of a South African Barbarians rugby team to the UK and a return visit by the British Lions rugby team the next year. He was dropped from the Government in 1981 in the wake of Mrs Thatcher's proposal that the British team pull out of the Moscow Olympics, receiving a consolatory knighthood that year. In 1986, he suggested that the government bill the Kremlin in the amount of £1 million and provide the amount to Scottish farmers in compensation for losses to sheep herds caused by the Chernobyl nuclear disaster.

In 1988, a bomb exploded on Pan Am Flight 103, which crashed at Lockerbie, near his home. He was closely involved in the aftermath as the local constituency MP, and went out to Lockerbie with two other MPs. He was hailed by politicians of all political stripes for his compassion and caring; Scottish Labour MP Brian Wilson praised him as "a man who is truly a part of the community that he represents".

He returned to the Scottish Office on 9 April 1992, but he was sacked from this position on 5 July 1995. He became a member of the Privy Council in 1995, and following his retirement as an MP, was made a life peer as Baron Monro of Langholm, of Westerkirk in Dumfries and Galloway on 6 November 1997.

The number of Conservative MPs from Scotland declined from 24 when he was first elected an MP in 1964 to nil after the 1997 general election. A One Nation Conservative, he occasionally rebelled against the official party line, opposing the closing of British Steel Corporation's Ravenscraig steelworks, for example. One of his Labour Party opponents, Norman Hogg, dubbed him "the last of the decent Tories".

== Outside politics ==
Monro was a president of the Scottish Rugby Union, and he was honorary president of Langholm RFC for over 20 years. He managed the 1970 Scotland rugby union tour to Australia but had to return home to fight the 1970 General Election.

He was a long-serving member of the Nature Conservancy Council, and active in the National Farmers Union of Scotland. He was a member of the Royal Company of Archers, a deputy lieutenant of Dumfriesshire, and enjoyed vintage cars and country sports.

== Arms ==
Coat of arms of Hector Monro, Baron Monro of Langholm

Crest
A golden eagle close Proper.
Escutcheon
Or an eagle’s head erased Gules holding in its beak a stem of club moss Vert, on a chief paly of six Or and Sable a bend counterchanged.
Motto
Non Inferiora

== Notes ==
Parliament of the United Kingdom
Preceded by David Anderson	Member of Parliament for Dumfries; 1964–1997	Succeeded by Russell Brown
Political offices
Preceded by Denis Howell	Minister for Sport; 1979–1981	Succeeded by Neil Macfarlane
