= Waterlow and Sons =

Design company

- Type: Private Limited Company
- Industry: Secure printing
- Founded: 1810; 216 years ago
- Defunct: 2009; 17 years ago
- Fate: Acquired (1961; 65 years ago); Dissolved (2009; 17 years ago)
- Successor: De La Rue
- Headquarters: UK
- Products: Banknotes; Postage stamps Stock and bond certificates International Certificates of Vaccination

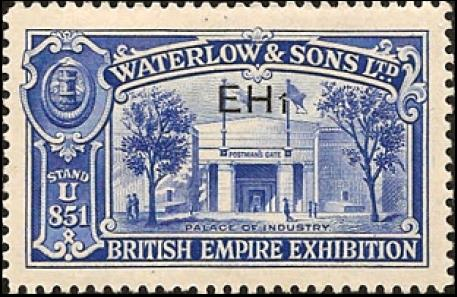
A promotional stamp produced in 1925 by Waterlow for the British Empire Exhibition.

Waterlow and Sons Limited was a major worldwide engraver of currency, postage stamps, shares and bond certificates based in London, Watford and Dunstable in England. The company was founded as a family business in 1810. It was acquired in 1961 by De La Rue.

== Early history ==
Waterlow and Sons originated from the business of James Waterlow, who began producing lithographic copies of legal documents at Birchin Lane in London in 1810. The company gradually grew; it began printing stamps in 1852, and Waterlow's sons Alfred, Walter, Sydney and Albert joined the business. James Waterlow died in 1876, and the company became a limited-liability company. In 1877, due to a family dispute, the company split, and Alfred and his sons formed Waterlow Bros. & Layton. The two companies later reunited in 1920.

In 1924, the Imperial Bank of Persia commissioned the company to print 1, 5 and 10 toman banknotes that bore the watermark of Lion and Sun for the first time.

== Portuguese banknote crisis ==
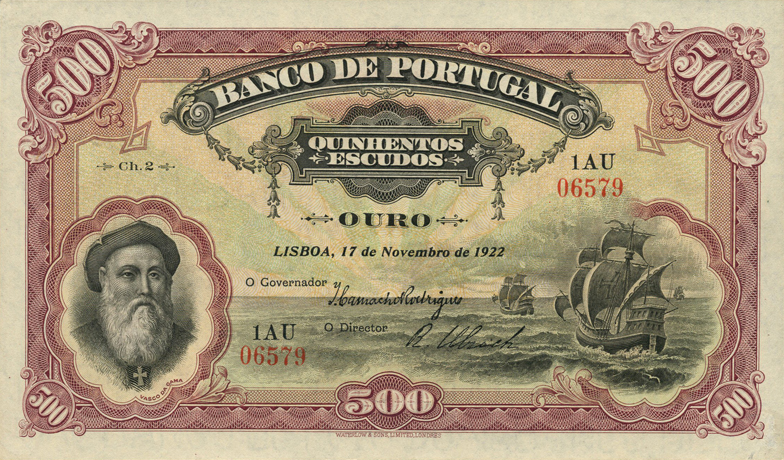
The fraudulent 500 Portuguese escudos banknote, involved in the Portuguese Bank Note Crisis.

Waterlow's, under the leadership of William Waterlow, was involved in the Portuguese Bank Note Crisis of 1925. The Banco de Portugal sued Waterlow & Sons in the High Court in London because of counterfeiting. In one of the most complex trials in legal history, the case was finally settled in favour of the bank in 1932. William Waterlow retired from Waterlow's and was subsequently elected as the 602nd Lord Mayor of London.

== Bank of England banknotes ==
In 1921 the Bank of England gained a legal monopoly on the issue of banknotes in England and Wales, a process that started with the Bank Charter Act 1844 when the ability of other banks to issues notes was restricted.

On 22 November 1928 the bank issued notes for ten shillings and one pound for the first time when the bank took over responsibility for these denominations from the Treasury which had issued notes of these denominations three days after the declaration of war in 1914 in order to remove gold coins from circulation. The treasury bills had been printed by Waterlows, and the loss of the contract contributed to the closure of Waterlow's operations at Milton Street in Watford.

== De La Rue ownership ==
Waterlow's was acquired by Purnell and Sons in 1961, but Purnell sold Waterlow's segment that printed banknotes, postage stamps, traveller's checks, and bonds to De La Rue soon after.

In 2003 De La Rue acquired the banknote printing operations of the Bank of England, 75 years after Waterlow's had lost the business.

Waterlow and Sons Ltd was dissolved in January 2009 but re-incorporated as a dormant company in November 2016.

== Gallery ==
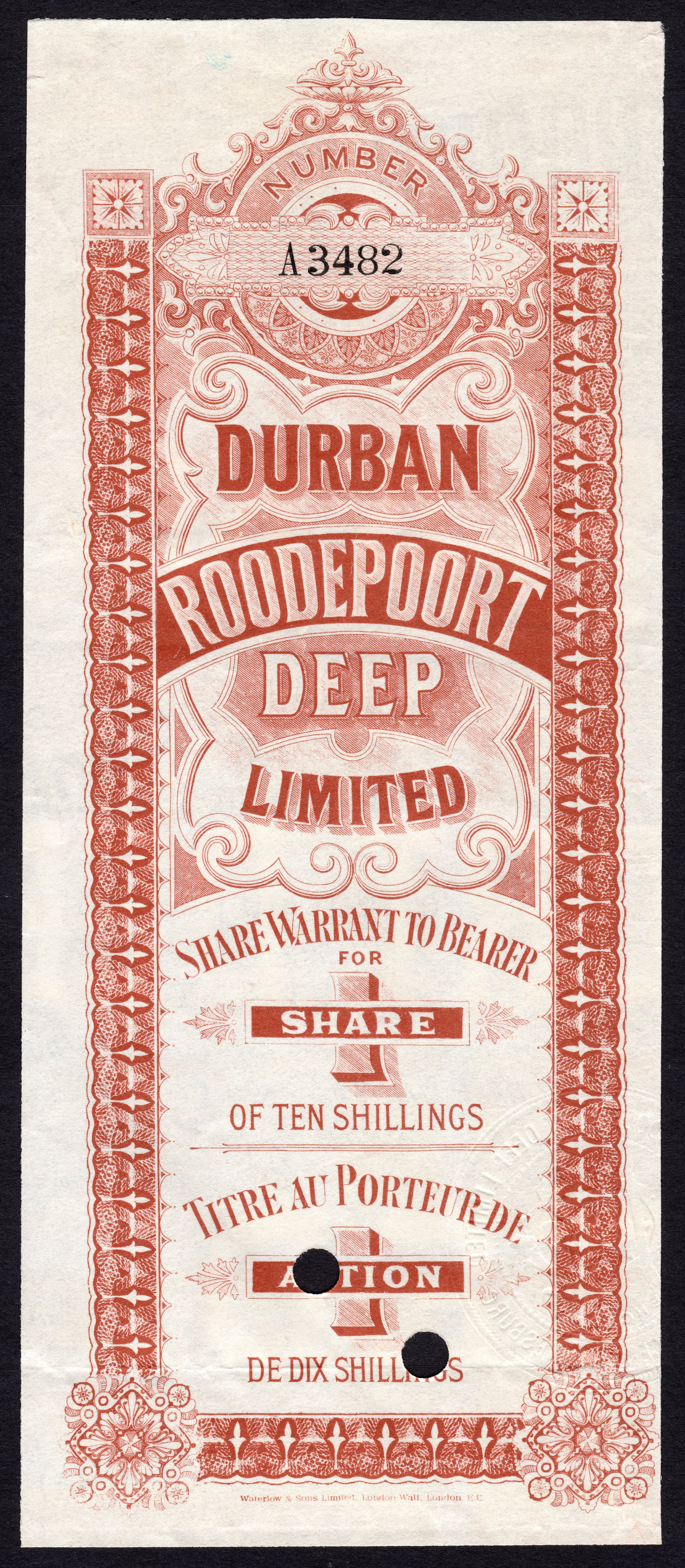
Durban Roodepoort Deep Limited gold mine share warrant c. 1890s.

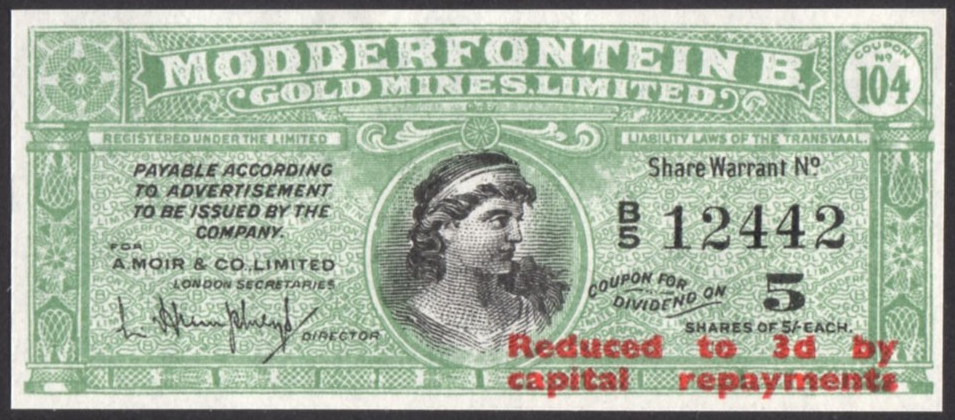
Modderfontein B. Gold Mines Limited dividend coupon. (c. 1900)

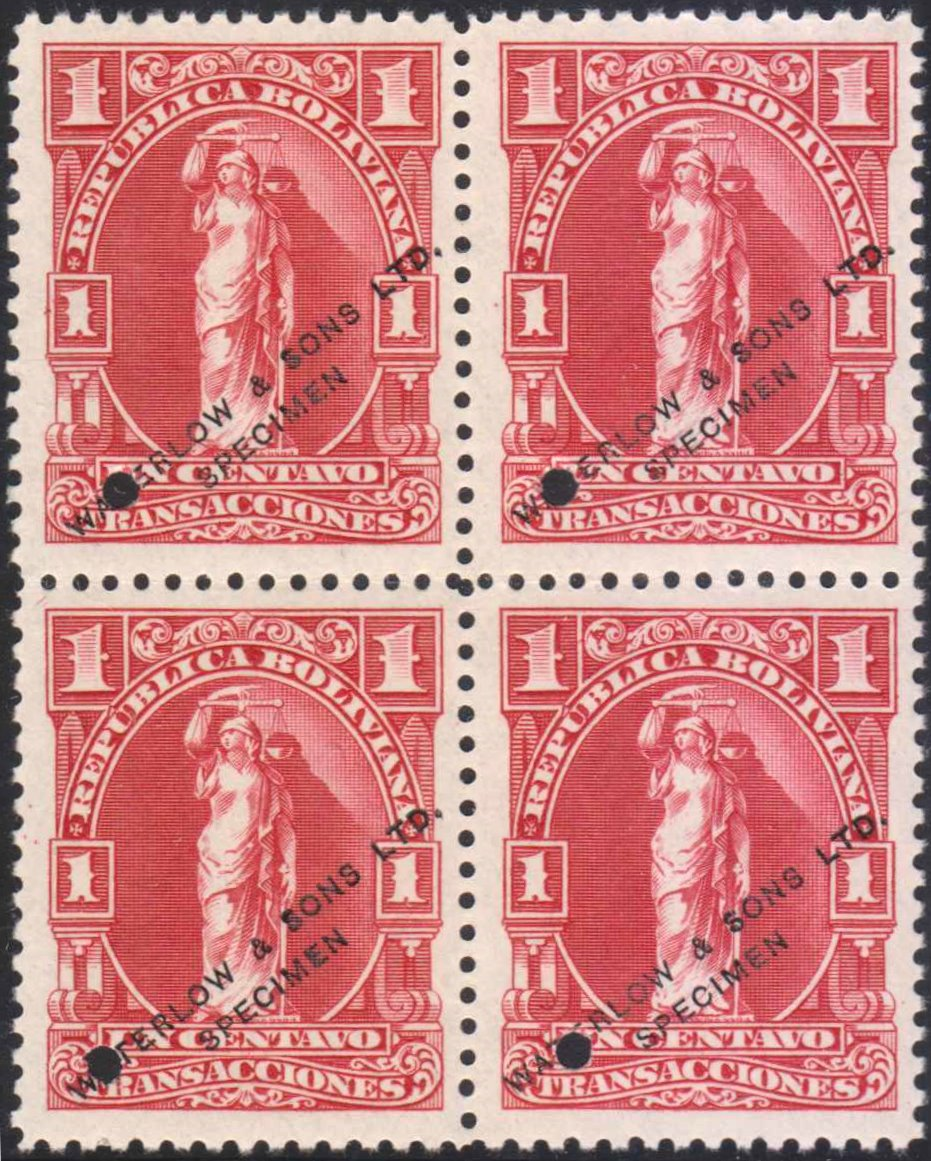
Revenue stamps of Bolivia.

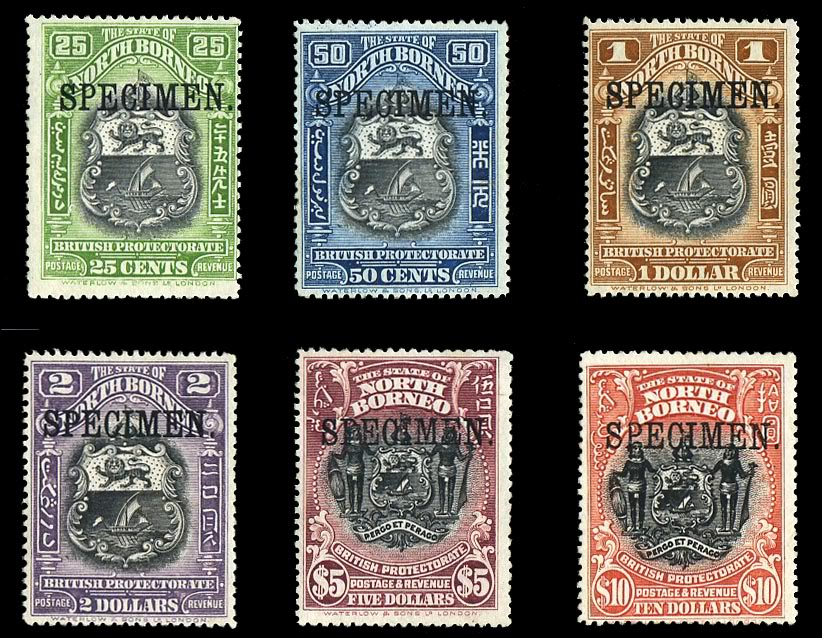
Stamps of North Borneo. (1911)

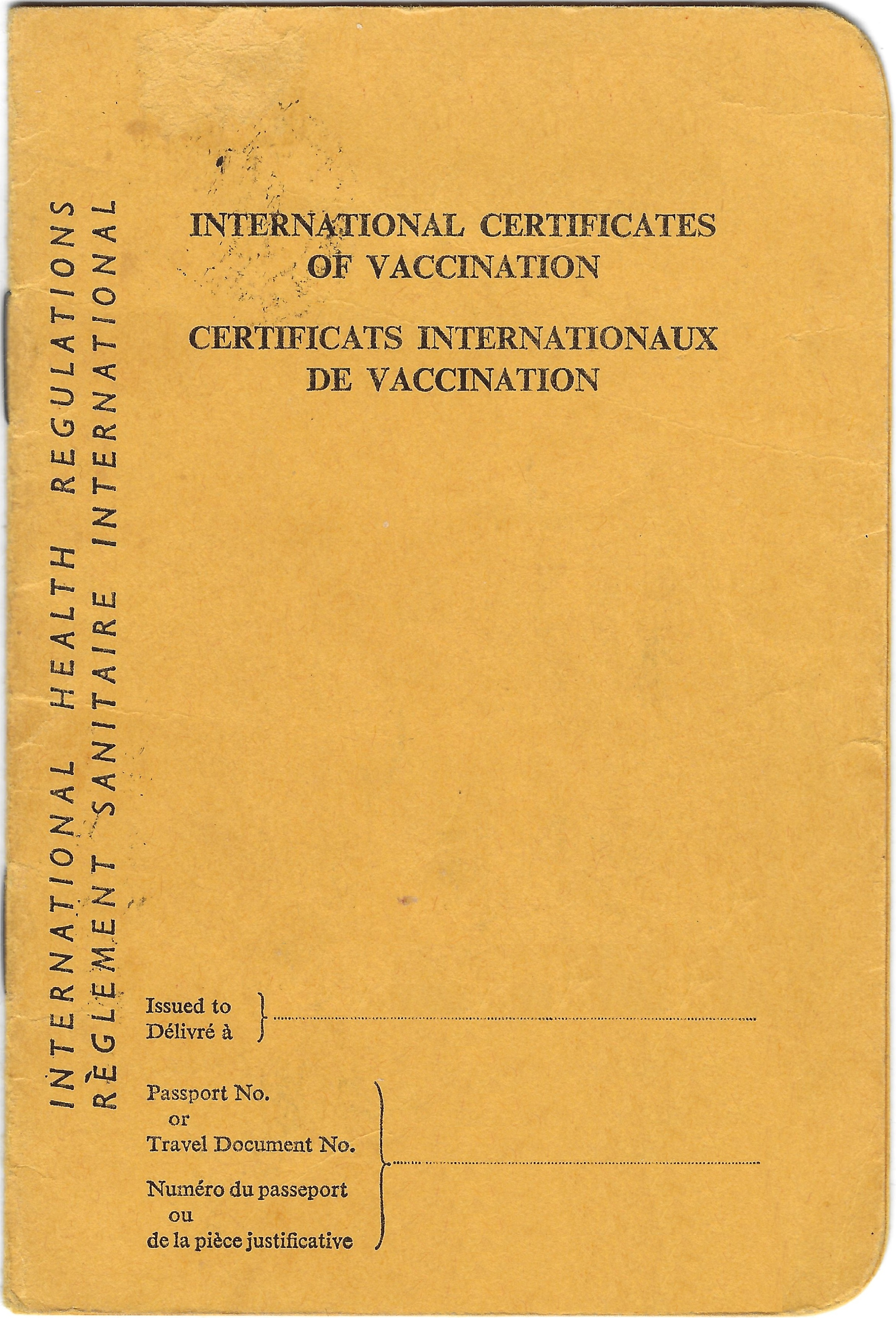
Int. Certificates of Vaccination.

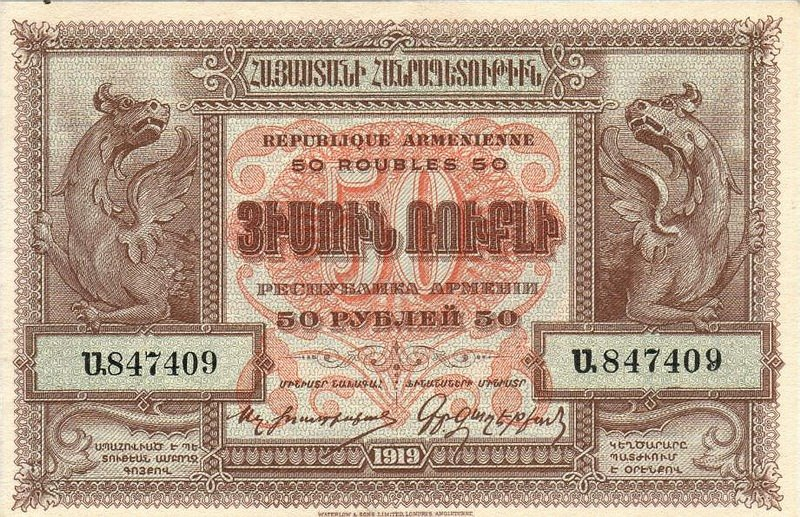
50 ruble issued for First Republic of Armenia, (1920 real).
