= Prince Albert's Model Cottage =

Model dwelling for poor families in the UK, introduced at the 1851 Great Exhibition

Coordinates: 51.798°N 0.082°W

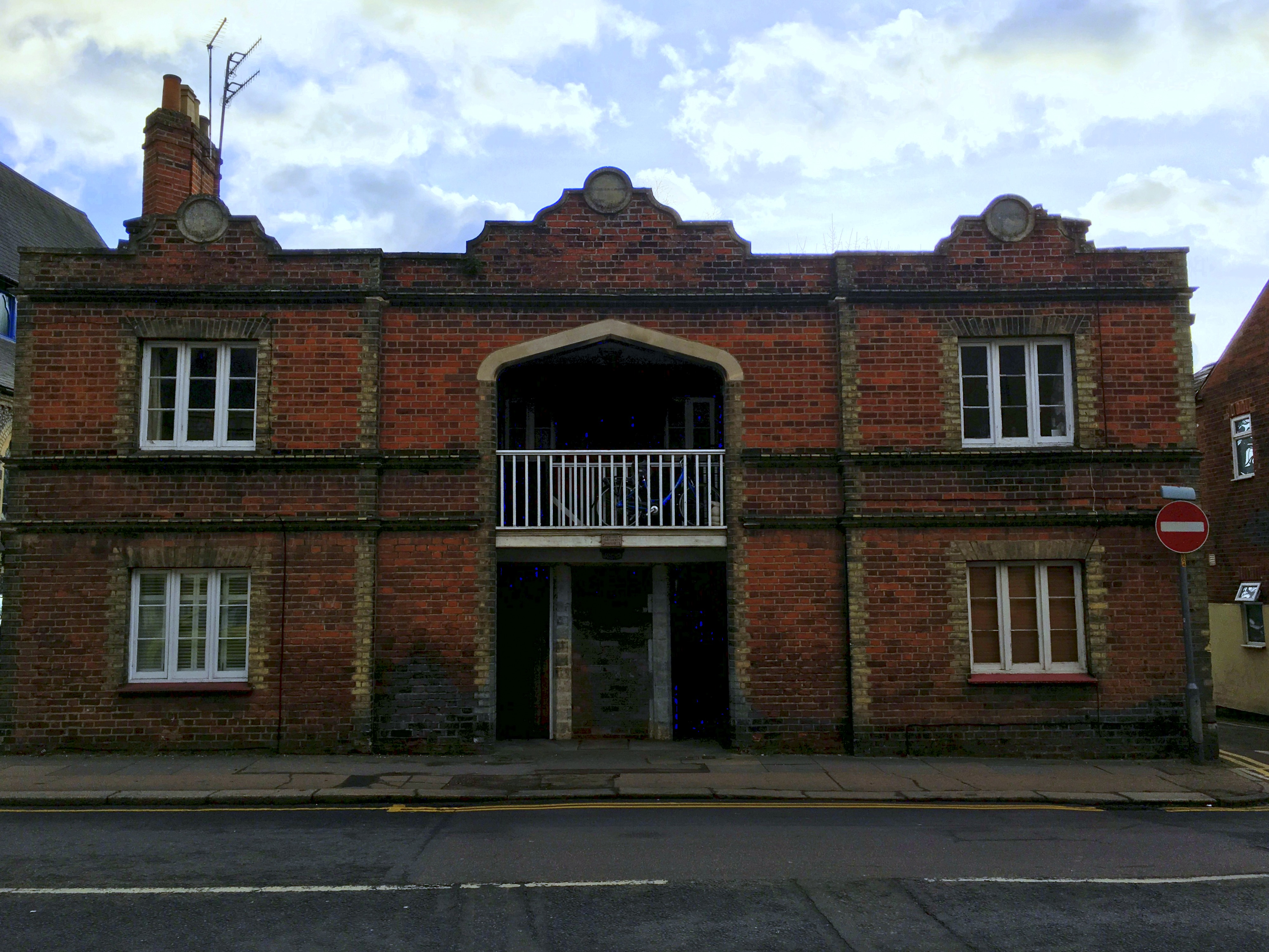
A Prince Albert Cottage in Hertford, Hertfordshire

Prince Albert's Model Cottage was the name given to a model dwelling designed in the mid-19th century to offer an improved form of accommodation for poor families in England. It was supported by Prince Albert, husband of Queen Victoria, designed by architect Henry Roberts, and built by the Society for Improving the Conditions of the Labouring Classes for display at the 1851 Great Exhibition in Hyde Park, London.

== History ==
An early illustration of the cottages

The original Prince Albert's Model Cottage, also known as the Prince Consort Model Lodge, was built by the Society for Improving the Conditions of the Labouring Classes (SICLC) for display at the 1851 Great Exhibition in Hyde Park, London. Prince Albert, who had considerable interest in improved housing for the poor, was president of the Society. The Society wanted to have the model dwelling built on the Exhibition grounds, but the Exhibition commissioners were unwilling to have an exhibit that addressed such social issues. With the intervention of Prince Albert it was agreed that the building could be constructed close to, but not on, the Exhibition grounds, and this was done at the Knightsbridge Cavalry Barracks. At the conclusion of the Great Exhibition the cottage was dismantled and rebuilt in Kennington. By one estimate over 250,000 people visited the cottage, including Queen Victoria and Charles Dickens. The final room visited contained pamphlets and books on model dwellings, as well as the architectural plans for the building through which the visitor had just walked, together with plans of other model dwellings built elsewhere by the society.

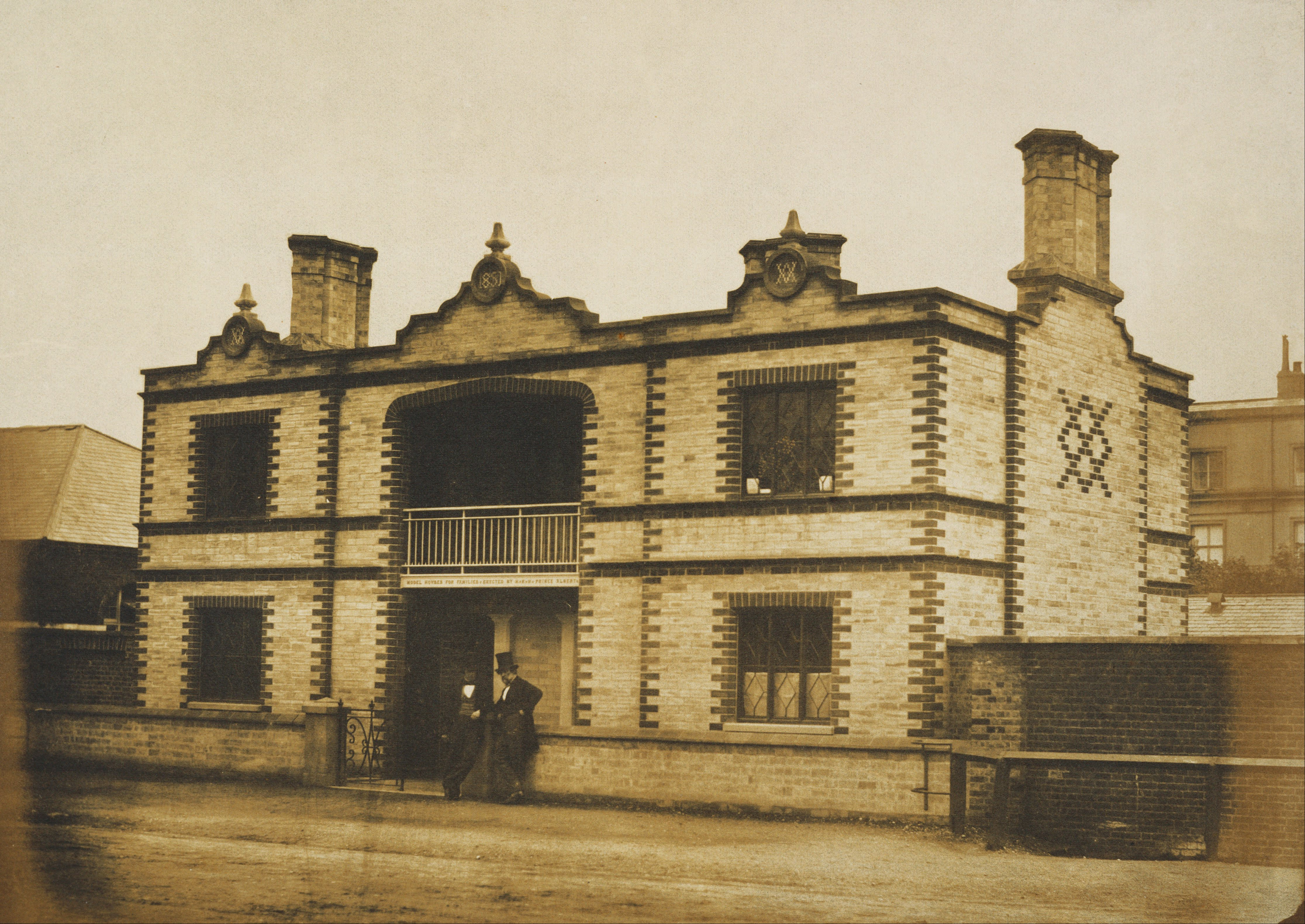
Photograph by Claude-Marie Ferrier of the original cottage during the Great Exhibition, inscribed on the balcony "Model Houses for Families. Erected by HRH Prince Albert".

== Design ==
The model cottage was designed by Henry Roberts, who was honorary architect to the SICLC, and, like the Prince Consort, was interested in upgrading housing for the working class. The cottage demonstrated at the Great Exhibition was possibly conceived as a model for larger blocks of flats (designs for a three-storey version were prepared). It was designed to house four families, with two flats, or apartments, on each level. Roberts indicated that the design was aimed at “the class of mechanical and manufacturing operatives who usually reside in towns or in their immediate vicinity”. Each flat had a living room, with a built-in cupboard heated by the fireplace that was also "well contrived equally to cook the family meals at midday and to warm the feet of the family group at eve", a kitchen/scullery, three bedrooms and a toilet. Bathrooms were not usually provided in houses built in England at this time. Three bedrooms were included for the sake of "decency" so that children of different sex would not have to share a room. The most notable external feature was the covered central staircase to give access to the two upper flats. Hollow bricks were used for construction of the building. These were claimed to be sound resistant, damp resistant, non-porous, and cheap to make. The internal face of the walls was smooth and plastering was considered unnecessary.

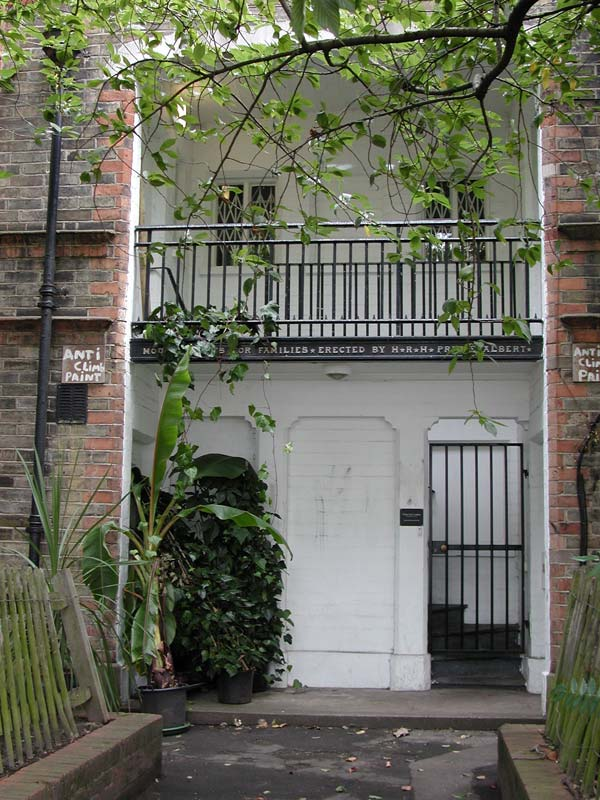
The original Prince Albert Cottage, in Kennington

== Subsequent developments ==
Although built outside the main Great Exhibition area, the Prince Albert cottage exhibit was awarded one of the 170 Council Medals, the Exhibition's highest award. The design provided a catalyst for further work on model buildings and Roberts and the Society circulated several publications on the topic, including “The Dwellings of the Labouring Classes”.

In 1852 the cottage was rebuilt in Kennington Park, south of the River Thames, and housed two park attendants and a cottage museum. Subsequently, it was occupied by the park superintendent and since 2003 has been the headquarters of the Trees for Cities charity. The design was used in several other locations, including Stepney and Kensington in London and Abbots Langley and Hertford, both in Hertfordshire. However, despite benefiting from the abolition of Britain's brick tax in 1850, and while a success with the public, the cottages were not a commercial success, although the Spectator had calculated that a return on capital of between five and seven percent per annum would be possible. The innovative use of hollow bricks was also never widely copied. The tenements have since been periodically refurbished, most recently during the 1970s.

== See also ==
- List of existing model dwellings
