= Industrial Dwellings Society =

The Industrial Dwellings Society (1885) Ltd.
- Type: Public
- Industry: Housing
- Predecessor: Four Per Cent Industrial Dwellings Company
- Founded: 1885, in London
- Founder: Nathan Rothschild
- Headquarters: London, England
- Area served: London Boroughs of Hackney, Tower Hamlets, Southwark, Redbridge and Barnet, Borough of Hertsmere, Canvey Island
- Products: Model dwellings
- Website: www.ids.org.uk

The Industrial Dwellings Society (1885) Ltd. (IDS) was formed in London during the Victorian era as a philanthropic model dwellings company, known at the time as the Four Per Cent Industrial Dwellings Company. In 1952 the organisation took its present name and form and is today commonly known as simply IDS.

The IDS manages over 1,400 properties in the London Boroughs of Hackney, Tower Hamlets, Southwark, Redbridge and Barnet, the Borough of Hertsmere, and Canvey Island.

== History ==
The foundation of the company followed the United Synagogue's enquiry into "spiritual destitution" in 1884.

The company was founded in 1885 by Nathan Rothschild and a board of other prominent, Jewish philanthropists including Frederick Mocatta and Samuel Montagu, to provide "the industrial classes with commodious and healthy Dwellings at a minimum rent". The company was founded as a private capital concern, with capital of £50,000 in 5000 shares of £10 each:

It is estimated that if the rentals were based on a net return of 4 per cent excellent accommodation consisting of two rooms, a small scullery, and w.c. could be supplied at a weekly rental of five shillings per tenement; and it is considered that many investors will be found willing and even anxious to contribute their capital towards a scheme, which while yielding a moderate and safe return, will largely tend, not only to improve the dwellings of the poor, but also reduce the high rates now paid for the minimum of accommodation.

Of this, Rothschild himself subscribed £10,000, and even paid for the site of the company's first project (in Flower and Dean Street, Spitalfields) himself, months before the first meeting of the Company directors.

These first buildings were to be known as Charlotte de Rothschild Buildings, after Lord Rothschild's mother, and took up parts of Thrawl Street, Flower and Dean Street, and George Street, Spitalfields.

The majority of the Four Per Cent Company's tenants were Jewish. By 1905, it had built six large blocks (known as 'Rothschild houses' comprising around 1,500 flats, or 3,800 rooms. "Each had two rooms, shared a toilet and kitchen with the adjacent flat, and opened to outdoor halls and stairways. In order to reimburse investors at the promised rate, the six storey buildings occupies no less than 50% of the ground space and tenants paid about 5s to 6s a week (25p to 30p). These grey stone houses were drab and draughty, but they were also solid and sanitary, and were probably better flats than those in other projects of the time."

== Present day ==
Today, IDS manages a large number of properties, predominantly in the East of London, but also in Southwark, Hertsmere and Barnet, including flats, houses, sheltered housing, accommodation for people with special needs, key worker housing and shared ownership properties. It still specialises in culturally specific housing and acquired the Ajex Housing Association for Jewish ex-servicemen/women in 2006; IDS also works with the Otto Schiff housing association, Agudas Israel Housing Association and the Bangla Housing Association. IDS is chaired by Michael Brodtman and the Chief Executive is Jonathan Gregory.

== Buildings ==
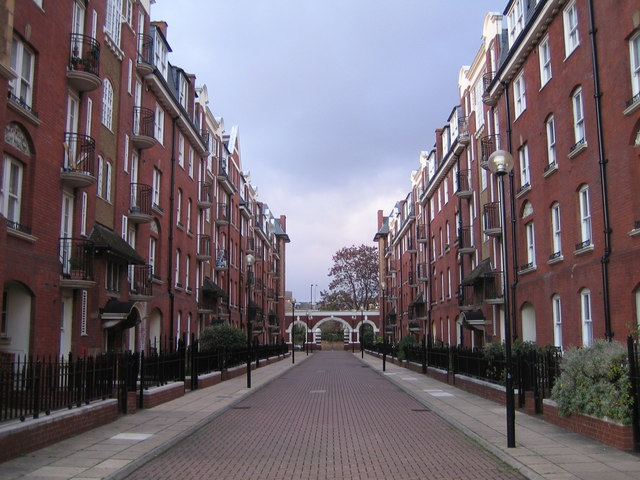
Navarino Mansions, Dalston Lane, London E8, built by the Four Per Cent Industrial Dwellings Company in 1903–1905

- Charlotte de Rothschild Dwellings, Flower and Dean Street, Spitalfields (a.k.a. Rothschild Buildings) (1886)
- Evelina Mansions, New Church Road, Camberwell
- Nathaniel Dwellings, Flower and Dean Street, Spitalfields
- Mocatta House, Brady Street, Whitechapel (1890)
- Navarino Mansions, Dalston Lane, Hackney (1903–1905)
- Stepney Green Court, Stepney Green
- Silver Jubilee Mews, Canvey Island

== See also ==
- List of existing model dwellings
