= Street names of Belgravia =

This is a list of the etymology of street names in the London district of Belgravia. The following utilises the generally accepted boundaries of the area viz. South Carriage Drive to the north, Grosvenor Gardens/Place/Square to the east, Buckingham Palace Road/Victoria railway line to the south-east and Chelsea Bridge Road, Lower Sloane Street/Sloane Square/Sloane Street to the west.

Many of these streets are named for the landowning Grosvenor family and its titles and other properties. The building of this area was largely begun by Richard Grosvenor, 2nd Marquess of Westminster and third Viscount Belgrave.

- Albert Gate – named for Albert, Prince Consort, husband of Queen Victoria
- Ann's Close – unknown
- Avery Farm Row – after a former farm here of this name; 'Avery' is a corruption of 'Ebury'
- Belgrave Mews South, Belgrave Mews West, Belgrave Place, Belgrave Square, Belgrave Yard, Lower Belgrave Street and Upper Belgrave Street – after the Grosvenor estate Belgrave, Cheshire.
- Bloomfield Terrace – alteration of 'Blomfield', after Charles James Blomfield, Bishop of London 1828 – 1856, who consecrated the nearby Church of St Barnabas, Pimlico
- Boscobel Place – after a former pub here called the Royal Oak, by association with Charles II who hid from Parliamentary forces in the Royal Oak at Boscobel House
- Bowland Yard
- Bourne Street – as this used to run beside the river Westbourne
- Buckingham Palace Road – by association with Buckingham Palace, originally built for John Sheffield, Duke of Buckingham
- Bunhouse Place – after a former shop here selling Chelsea buns
- Burton Mews
- Cadogan Lane and Cadogan Place – after Lord Cadogan, owner of this land when Henry Holland started building here in the 1750s
- Capener's Close – after John Capener, 19th century builder who owned a carpentry/undertakers business here
- Caroline Terrace – unknown
- Chapel Street – after a former Lock chapel here adjacent to a hospital, both now demolished
- Chelsea Bridge Road – as it leads to Chelsea Bridge opened 1858
- Chesham Close, Chesham Mews, Chesham Place and Chesham Street – after the Lowndes family, former local landowners, whose seat was at Chesham, Buckinghamshire
- Chester Close, Chester Cottages, Chester Mews, Chester Row, Chester Square, Chester Square Mews, Chester Street and Little Chester Street – the Grosvenors owned land in Chester
- Cliveden Place – after Cliveden House in Buckinghamshire, a Grosvenor property in the late 19th century
- Cundy Street – after Thomas Cundy and his son, surveyors to the Grosvenors in the 19th century
- Dorset Mews – presumably after the Dorset landholding of the Grosvenor family
- Dove Walk
- D'Oyley Street – after Sarah D'Oyley, who inherited land here from her grandfather Hans Sloane
- Duplex Rid
- Eaton Close, Eaton Mews North, Eaton Mews South, Eaton Mews West, Eaton Place, Eaton Row, Eaton Square, Eaton Terrace, Eaton Terrace Mews, South Eaton Place and West Eaton Place – after Eaton Hall, Cheshire, seat of the Grosvenor family
- Ebury Bridge Road, Ebury Mews, Ebury Mews East, Ebury Square and Ebury Street – as this area was formerly part of the manor of Ebury, thought to have originated as a Latinisation of the Anglo-Saxon toponym 'eyai', which means 'island' in reference to a marsh that once dominated the area
- Eccleston Mews and Eccleston Place – after the Grosvenors' property in Eccleston, Cheshire
- Elizabeth Street – after Elizabeth Leveson-Gower, wife of Richard Grosvenor, 2nd Marquess of Westminster
- Ellis Street – after Anne Ellis, who inherited land here from her grandfather Hans Sloane
- Frederic Mews – unknown
- Gatliff Road – after Charles Gatliff, a founding member and long-serving Honorary Secretary of the Metropolitan Association for Improving the Dwellings of the Industrious Classes
- Gerald Road – unknown
- Graham Terrace – formerly Graham Street after its 19th century lessee/builder William Graham
- Groom Place – after a former pub here called the Horse and Groom
- Grosvenor Cottages, Grosvenor Crescent, Grosvenor Crescent Mews, Grosvenor Gardens, Grosvenor Gardens Mews North, Grosvenor Gardens Mews South, Grosvenor Place and Grosvenor Road – after the Grosvenor family
- Halkin Arcade, Halkin Street and West Halkin Street – after Halkyn Castle in Wales, a Grosvenor property
- Harriet Street and Harriet Walk – after Harriet Lowndes of the Lowndes family, former local landowners
- Headfort Place – after Thomas Taylour, 3rd Marquess of Headfort, who lived nearby on Belgrave Square
- Hobart Place – named after Robert Hobart, 4th Earl of Buckinghamshire, who lived nearby on Grosvenor Place
- Holbein Mews and Holbein Place – after Hans Holbein the Younger, who painted local families for a period in the 1520s; its former name was The Ditch, as it lay next to the river Westbourne
- Kinnerton Place North, Kinnerton Place South, Kinnerton Street and Kinnerton Yard – after Grosvenor property in Lower Kinnerton, Cheshire
- Knightsbridge – unknown; there are several theories – see Knightsbridge#Origins of name
- Laneborough Place
- Lowndes Close, Lowndes Place, Lowndes Square and Lowndes Street – after the Lowndes family, former local landowners
- Lyall Mews, Lyall Mews West and Lyall Street – after Charles Lyall, business partner with local landowners the Lowndes
- Lygon Place – unknown
- Minera Mews – after Minera, Wales, where the Grosvenors had property
- Montrose Place – as this lay near a house owned by the Dukes and Duchesses of Montrose
- Motcomb Street – after Motcombe, Dorset, where the Grosvenors had property
- Newland Street – unknown; now the western part of Chester Row
- Old Barrack Yard – as this approached a former barracks located on Wilton Place
- Ormonde Place – probably after the Dukes of Ormonde, who owned Ormonde House in Chelsea
- Palace Mews – probably by association with the nearby Buckingham Palace Road
- Passmore Street – after its 1830s builder Richard Passmore
- Pembroke Close – unknown
- Phipp's Mews
- Pimlico Road – as it leads to Pimlico, possibly named after Ben Pimlico, 17th century brewer
- Pont Street – thought to be from the French 'pont' (bridge), over the river Westbourne
- Ranelagh Grove – after Richard Jones, 1st Earl of Ranelagh who owned a house near here in the late 17th century
- Rembrandt Close
- Roberts Mews – after Robert Grosvenor, 1st Marquess of Westminster
- St Barnabas Street – after the nearby Church of St Barnabas, Pimlico
- St Michael's Mews
- Sedding Street and Sedding Studios – after John Dando Sedding, designer of the nearby Holy Trinity, Sloane Street church
- Semley Place – after a Grosvenor property called Semley
- Serpentine Walk – as it leads to The Serpentine lake in Hyde Park
- Seville Street – unknown; it was formerly Charles Street, after Charles Lowndes of the local landowning Lowndes family
- Skinner Place
- Sloane Gardens, Sloane Square, Sloane Street, Sloane Terrace and Lower Sloane Street – after Hans Sloane, local landowner when this area was built up in the 18th century
- South Carriage Drive – after the carriage which formerly used this path
- Studio Place – as this area was home to many artists' studios in the early 20th century
- Wellington Buildings
- Whittaker Street – after its 1830 builder John Whittaker
- Wilbraham Place – unknown
- William Mews and William Street – after William Lowndes of the local landowning Lowndes family
- Wilton Crescent Mews, Wilton Place, Wilton Row, Wilton Street and Wilton Terrace – Eleanor Egerton, daughter of the first Earl of Wilton, was the wife of Robert Grosvenor, 1st Marquess of Westminster
