= List of existing model dwellings =

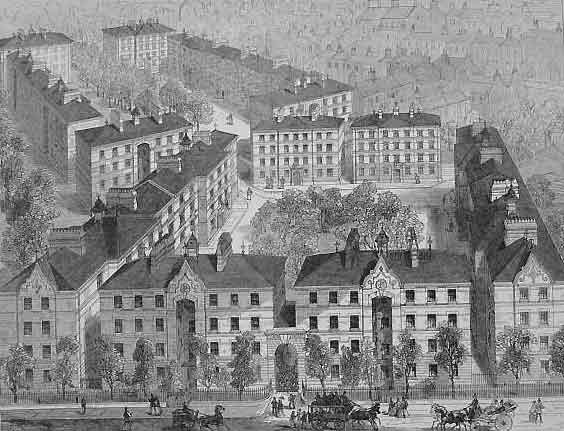
Peabody Square Model Dwellings in Blackfriars Road, Southwark

Model dwellings were buildings or estates constructed, mostly during the Victorian era, along philanthropic lines to provide decent living accommodation for the working class. They were typically erected by private model dwellings companies and usually with the aim of making a return on investment, hence the description of the movement as "five per cent philanthropy." As such they were forerunners of modern-day municipal housing.

This is a list of still-standing model dwellings, organised by builder. Most of these companies are now defunct; a few, such as the Peabody Trust are still operating and building new accommodation, and others have been subsumed by larger firms. This list covers urban development on the principle of "five per cent philanthropy"; for communities built to house workers for a particular trade or employer, see model village or company town.

== Artizans, Labourers & General Dwellings Company ==
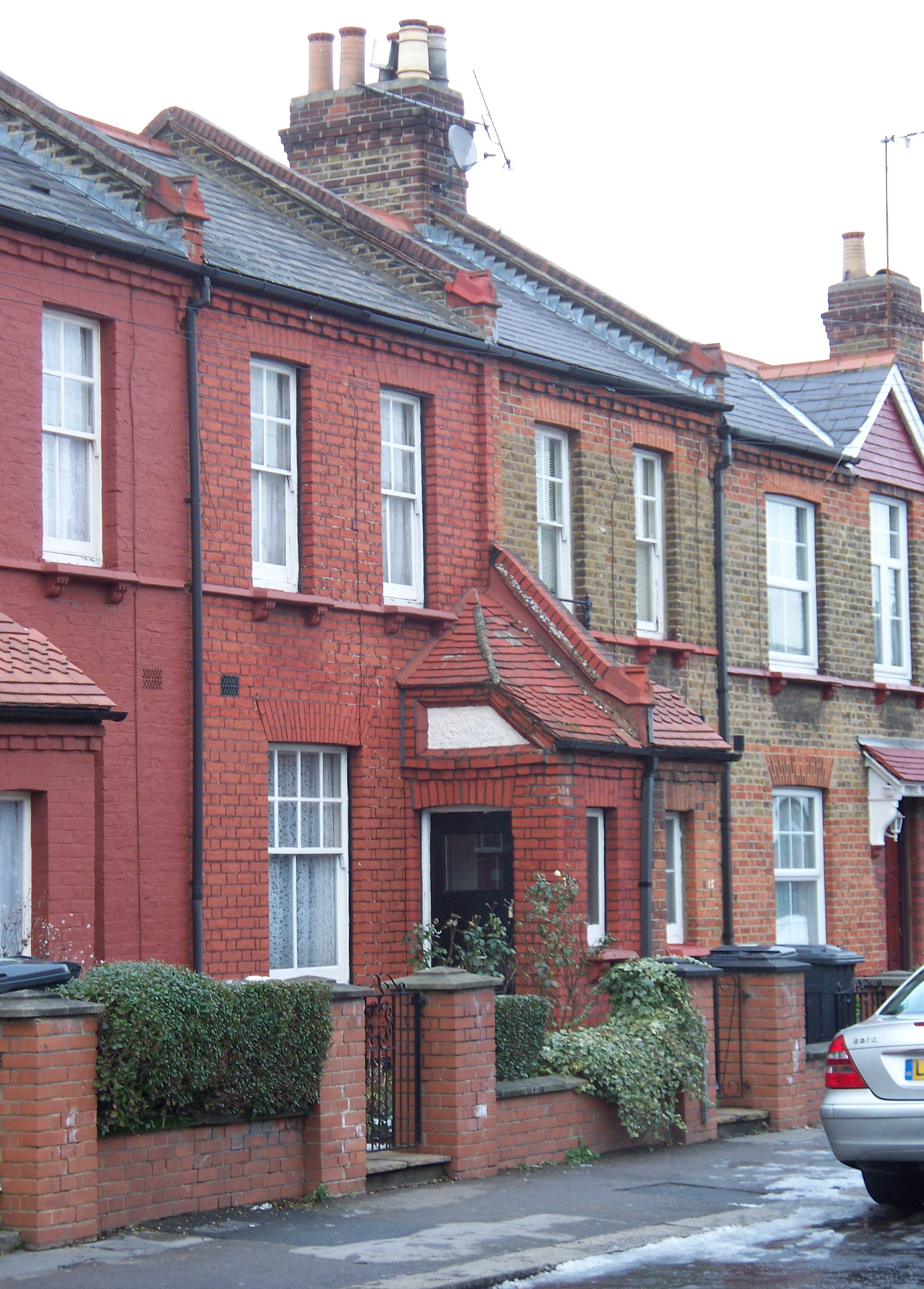

The Artizans' Company (ALGDC) was established in 1867 by William Austin, becoming one of the largest of the model dwellings companies in the late Victorian era. It was best known for its large, low-rise, suburban estates in London. It was later subsumed into Sun Life Financial.

Name of dwelling	Location	Date of construction
Noel Park	Wood Green, London	1882–1929
Pinnerwood Park	Pinner, London	1932–1935
Queen's Park	Kilburn, London	1874–1881
Shaftesbury Park	Battersea, London	1872–1877
Leigham Court	Streatham, London	1889–1928
Crawford Buildings	Marylebone, London	1893
Wendover Court (formerly East Street Buildings)	Marylebone, London	1890-1891
Seymour Buildings	Marylebone, London	1889

== Chester Cottage Improvement Company ==
The Chester Cottage Improvement Company was founded in 1892, and was a particular concern of the Duke of Westminster.

Name of dwelling	Location	Date of construction
Priory Place	Chester, Cheshire	1898

== East End Dwellings Company ==
The EEDC was founded by Samuel Barnett and others in 1882 in order to provide particularly for the area that is now the London Borough of Tower Hamlets.

Name of dwelling	Location	Date of construction
Museum House	Burnham Road, Bethnal Green, London	1888
Dunstan Houses	Stepney Green, London	1899
Thornhill Houses	Thornhill Road, Barnsbury, London	1902
Whidborne Buildings	Kings Cross, London	1890s

== Edinburgh Co-Operative Building Company ==
The Edinburgh Co-Operative Building Company (ECBC) was founded by a group of stonemasons in Edinburgh in 1861. By 1872 they had built nearly 1,000 houses in six parts of Edinburgh and Leith, commonly known as colony houses.

Name of dwelling	Location	Date of construction
Abbeyhill Colonies	London Road, Abbeyhill, Edinburgh	
Dalry Colonies	Dalry, Edinburgh	1868–1870
Shaftesbury Park	Shandon, Edinburgh	1883–1904
Stockbridge Colonies	Glenogle Road, Stockbridge, Edinburgh	1861–1867

== Four Per Cent Industrial Dwellings Company ==
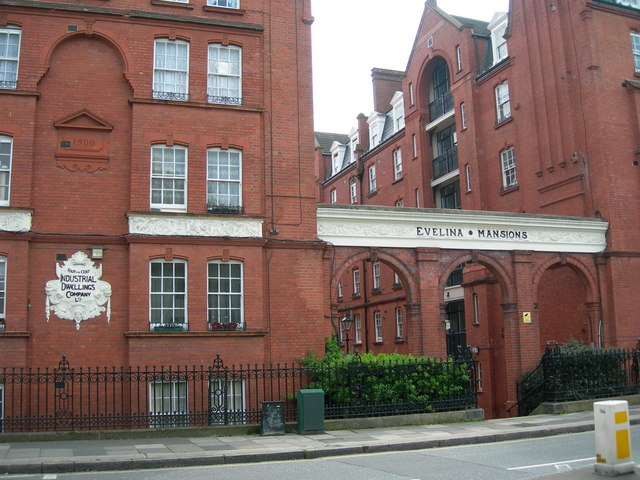
Evelina Mansions, Camberwell

Name of dwelling	Location	Date of construction
Stepney Green Court	Stepney Green, London	1896
Navarino Mansions	Dalston Lane, Hackney	1903-5
Mocatta House	Brady Street, Whitechapel, London	1905
Evelina Mansions	Camberwell, London	1900
Rebecca House	Mile End, London	1933

== Improved Industrial Dwellings Company ==
The Improved Industrial Dwellings Company (IIDC) was founded by the stationer (and later Lord Mayor) Sir Sydney Waterlow in 1863.

Name of dwelling	Location	Date of construction
Asmun's Hill cottages	Hampstead Garden Suburb, London	1909
Clarendon Buildings	Balderton Street, Westminster, London	1872
Cobden Buildings	King's Cross Road, London	1865
Cromwell Building	Redcross Way, Camberwell, London	1864
Derby Buildings	Wicklow Street, Camden Town, London	c.1865
Grosvenor Estate (now operated by Peabody Trust)	Brownhart Gardens, Mayfair, London	1886–1982
Leopold Buildings	Bakers Rents, Poplar, London	1872
Stanley Buildings	Midland Road, Camden Town, London	1865
Tower Buildings	Brewhouse Lane, Wapping, London	1864
Waterlow Court	Hampstead Garden Suburb, London	1907–1909

== Metropolitan Association for Improving the Dwellings of the Industrious Classes ==
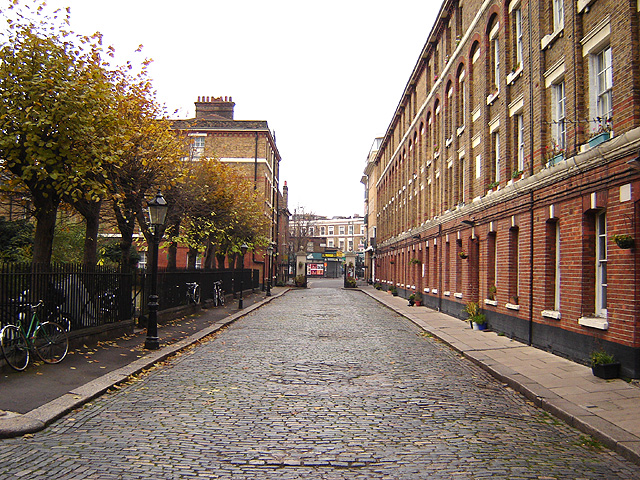
Gibson Gardens, Stoke Newington

The MAIDIC was the first company to be formed for the specific purpose of providing model homes, in 1844. It built mainly within London.

Name of dwelling	Location	Date of construction
Albert Cottages	Stepney, London	1858
Alexandra Cottages	Penge, London	1866–1868
Gibson Gardens	Stoke Newington, London	1880
Howard House	Deal Street, Stepney, London	1864
Victoria Cottages	Woodseer Street, Stepney, London	1864

== Newcastle upon Tyne Improved Industrial Dwellings Company ==
The Newcastle upon Tyne Improved Industrial Dwellings Company (NUTIIDC) was founded by James Hall in 1859.

Name of dwelling	Location	Date of construction
Garth Heads Industrial Workers' Dwellings	Byker, Newcastle upon Tyne	1869–1878

== Peabody Trust ==
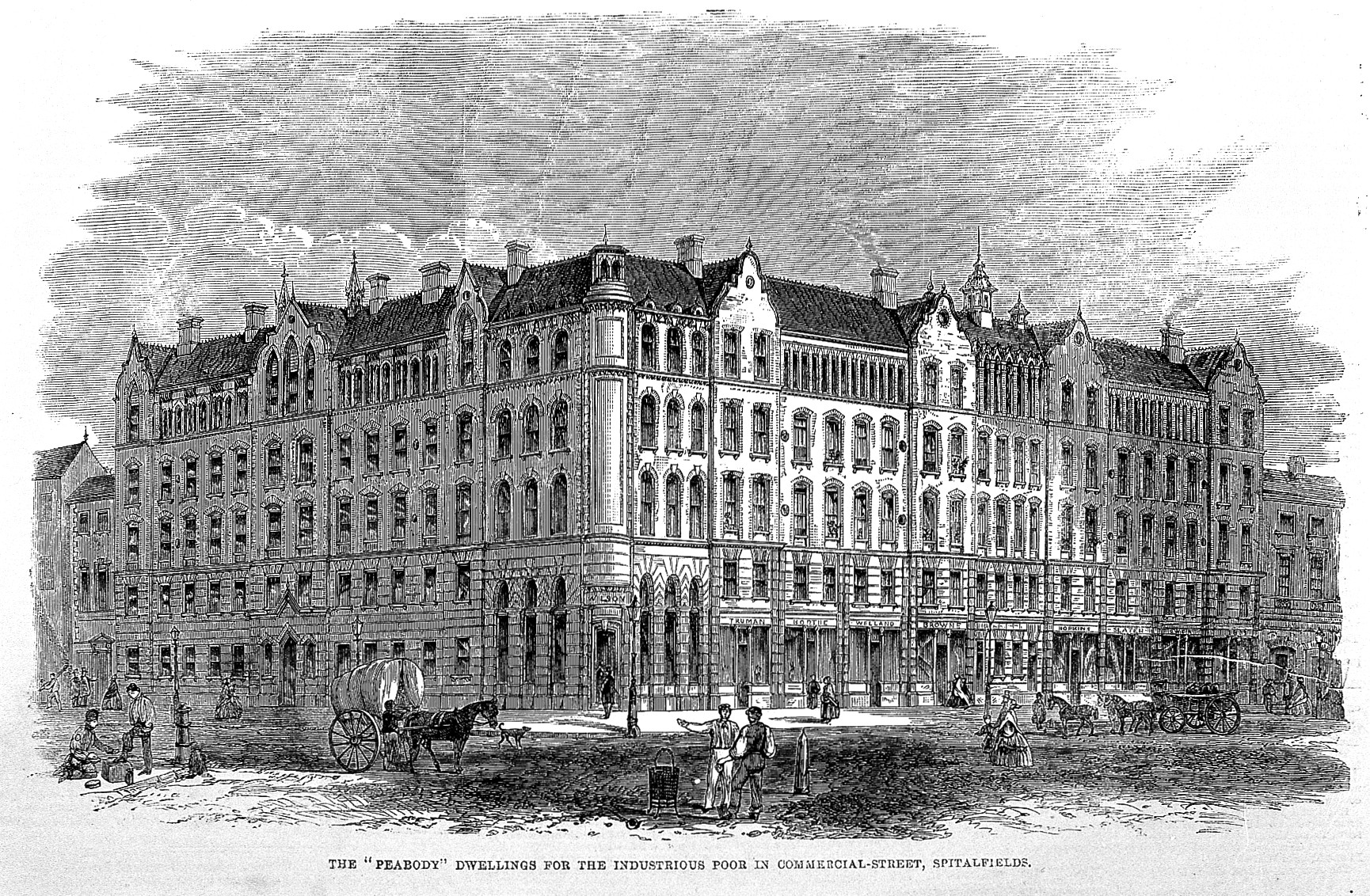
The first block of Peabody dwellings in Commercial Street, Spitalfields. A wood-engraving published in the Illustrated London News in 1863, shortly before the building opened.

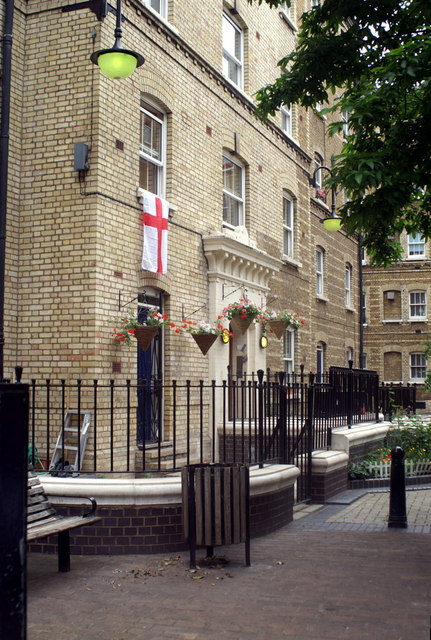
Whitecross Street Peabody Estate

The Peabody Trust was set up following a huge gift for the poor of London from the banker George Peabody in 1862. It became one of the largest providers of model housing for the working classes.

Name of dwelling	Location	Date of construction
Abbey Orchard Street Estate	Victoria, London	1880s
Bethnal Green Peabody Estate	Cambridge Crescent, Bethnal Green, London	1910
Coleshill Flats	Mozart Terrace, Westminster, London	1871
Horseferry Peabody Estate	Victoria, London	1922
Islington Peabody Estate	Greenman Street, Islington, London	1864–6
Langley Mansions	Langley Lane, Vauxhall, London	1900
Lawrence Street Peabody Estate	Lawrence Street, Chelsea, London	1870
Old Pye Street Peabody Estate	Victoria, London	1880s
Peabody Square	Blackfriars Road, Bermondsey, London	1871
Pimlico Peabody Estate	Peabody Avenue, Pimlico, London	1876
Poplar Peabody Estate	Elf Row, Poplar, London	1866
Shadwell Peabody Estate	Glamis Street, Stepney, London	1866
Spitalfields Peabody Dwellings	Commercial Street, Spitalfields, London	1863–4
Tottenham Peabody Estate	Lordship Lane, Tottenham, London	1907
Whitechapel Peabody Estate	John Fisher Street, Whitechapel, London	1880s
Whitecross Street Peabody Estate	Finsbury, London	1883
Wild Street Peabody Estate	Drury Lane, Covent Garden, London	

== Pilrig Model Dwellings Company ==
This company was founded in Edinburgh in 1849 and built the earliest model dwellings (see colony houses) in Edinburgh. The work of the PMDC was an inspiration to Henry Roberts, who went on to become one of the most prolific architects of model housing.

Name of dwelling	Location	Date of construction
Shaw Colonies	Shaw's Place, Edinburgh, Scotland	1849–1862

== Society for Improving the Condition of the Labouring Classes ==
The SICLC was one of the earliest model dwellings companies. It grew out of the Labourer's Friend Society into a housing provider in 1844 and built a number of properties in London, most of which no longer exist.

Name of dwelling	Location	Date of construction
Dimsdale Street (built to SICLC pattern for the Great Exhibition)	11 Cowbridge, Hertford, Hertfordshire	1852
Parnell House	Streatham Street, Camden Town	1849
Turner Court	St Luke's Street, Hull, East Riding of Yorkshire	1862

== Others ==
A number of other schemes were built by private individuals or other concerns.

Name of dwelling	Location	Date of construction	Notes
Friary Close	Marmion Road, Portsmouth	1851	Gothic style. Architect Thomas Ellis Owen. Comprises 24 individual dwellings and one shop on the Friary Close frontage.
New Court	Streatley Place, Hampstead, London	1854	Block of 30 flats, built for Hugh Jackson, solicitor.
Rosebank Cottages	Edinburgh, Scotland	1854–1860	Built by Sir James Gowans for "the better class of mechanics and others." Modelled on the Pilrig cottages.

== See also ==
- Company town
- Model villages
- Model Dwellings Companies
- Prince Albert's Model Cottage
