= Gatliff =

Gatliff may refer to:

- Gatliff, Kentucky, a community in Whitley County, Kentucky
- Betty Pat Gatliff (1930–2020), American forensic artist
- Frank Gatliff (1927–1990), Australian actor
- Charles Gatliff (1810-1891), English solicitor and long-serving secretary of the Metropolitan Association for Improving the Dwellings of the Industrious Classes
