= Agudas Israel =

Agudas Israel may refer to:

- Agudas Israel (Latvia), a political party in Latvia during the 1920s and 1930s
- World Agudath Israel, the political arm of Ashkenazi Haredi Judaism
- Agudat Yisrael, a political party representing the ultra-Orthodox population of Israel
- Agudath Israel of America, a Haredi Jewish communal organization in the United States
- Agudas Israel Housing Association, a British housing association
