= AIHA =

AIHA or Aiha may refer to:

- Agudas Israel Housing Association
- Albany Institute of History & Art
- AIHA Singapore, Singapore Ice Hockey Association
- American Industrial Hygiene Association
- Austrian Ice Hockey Association
- Autoimmune haemolytic anaemia
- Aaiha (or Aiha), village, plain, lake, and temporary wetland in Lebanon
- Aiha script, the writing system of the fictional Kesh language in the novel Always Coming Home by Ursula K. Le Guin
