= Cottage flat =

Housing style in the United Kingdom

Cottage flats, also known as four-in-a-block flats, are a style of housing common in Scotland, where there are single floor dwellings at ground level, and similar dwellings on the floor above. All have doors directly to the outside of the building, rather than into a common staircase (Scots: close), although some do retain a shared entrance.

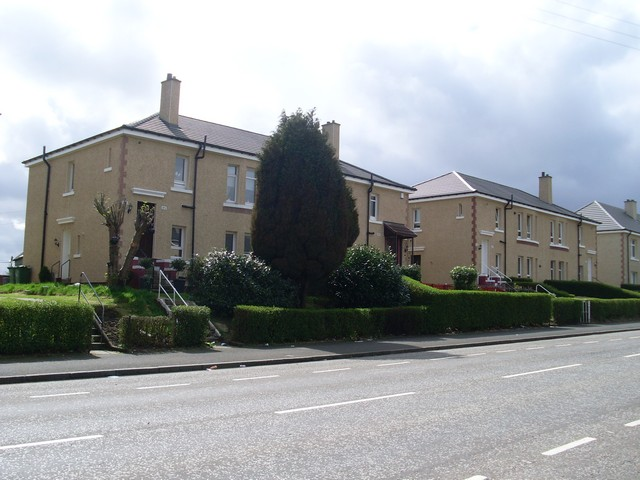
Typical Glasgow '4 in a block' dwellings in Carntyne

== History ==
The name 'cottage flats' is confusing as before the mid-1920s cottage housing referred to a single house, normally semi-detached, which contained living accommodation downstairs and bedrooms above. These were phased out by most urban local authorities as wasteful of space and economy after central government subsidies were reduced in the Housing Act 1924.

The majority consist of four dwellings per block (which appear like semi-detached houses), although such buildings are sometimes in the form of longer terraces. Many were built in the 1920s and 1930s as part of the 'Homes fit for heroes' programme, but it has proved a popular housing model and examples are still being built today. Cottage flats are the predominant form of housing in many parts of Glasgow, including Knightswood, Mosspark, Croftfoot and Carntyne. In Edinburgh they are found in Lochend, Saughton, Stenhouse and Prestonfield. Cottage flats are mostly found with one, two, or three bedrooms. Four bedroom blocks also exist but are rare.

In Edinburgh, colony houses are mid-Victorian cottage flat-type dwellings which are a similar idea, but of a very distinctly different architecture, being always found in terraces, never as semi-detached type cottages. They normally consist of a first floor flat with a two storey upper flat (known as a double upper), in early developments, accessed from an external stair. Both flats have their own garden either side of the building. The popularity of this arrangement has led to new developments echoing the form.

== Outside Scotland ==
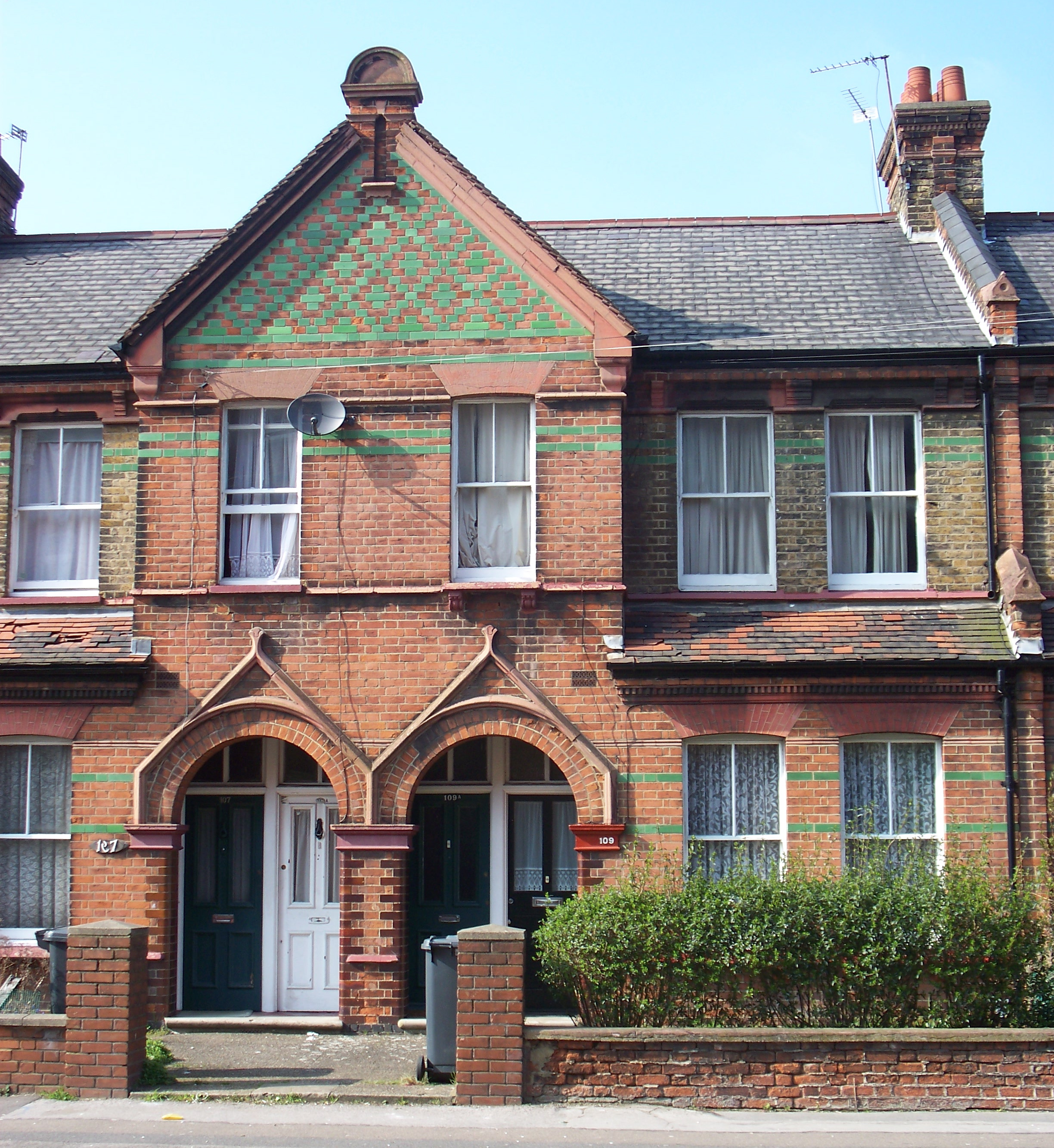
Cottage flats in Noel Park, London

Tyneside flats in Newcastle and Sunderland, flats on the Warner Estate in Walthamstow, London and Polish flats in Milwaukee, Wisconsin are also similar in form. Some of the model dwellings in Noel Park, London are cottage flats, typically in the middle of ordinary terraced housing.

The Scottish cottage flat and Tyneside flat models were brought to Montreal, Canada in the late 1850s where, usually in terrace form, they became the dominant housing type of the remainder of the 19th century. In Montreal, this housing is known as duplexes (sometimes four-plexes when referring to the paired arrangement). During the first third of the 20th century, the three-story variant – the triplex – became dominant, usually built with an outdoor stairway.

== See also ==
- Two-up two-down, referring to the rooms in a small house
