= Metropolitan Association for Improving the Dwellings of the Industrious Classes =

MAIDIC was a Victorian company, improving the dwellings of working classes in London

- Type: Public
- Industry: Housing
- Founded: 1841
- Founder: Thomas Southwood Smith, Lord Howard, Viscount Ebrington, Lord Haddo, Sir Ralph Howard
- Fate: Dissolved
- Successor: Metropolitan Property Association
- Headquarters: London
- Key people: Charles Gatliff (Honorary Secretary)
- Products: Model dwellings

In London, the Metropolitan Association for Improving the Dwellings of the Industrious Classes (MAIDIC) was a Victorian-era, philanthropically-motivated model dwellings company. The association, established in 1841, was fore-runner of the modern housing association which sought to provide affordable housing for the working classes on a privately run basis, with a financial return for investors. Although not the first society to build such homes, the Association was the first to be founded expressly for this purpose. As such it was one of the earliest adopters of the principal of the five per cent philanthropy model, outlined in the Company's resolution: "that an association be formed for the purpose of providing the labouring man with an increase of the comforts and conveniences of life, with full return to the capitalist."

== History ==
The association was formed in 1841 by a group including Thomas Southwood Smith, George Howard, 7th Earl of Carlisle, Viscount Ebrington, Lord Haddo, Sir Ralph Howard and Thomas Field Gibson and incorporated by Royal Charter in 1845.

Its first project was the Metropolitan Buildings in Old Pancras Road, Kings Cross, which consisted of 21 two-room and 90 three-room flats in five-storey blocks. It was demonstrated as an archetype of model dwellings and was visited by the Prince Consort in 1848, as well as William Gladstone, Charles Kingsley, Lord Shaftesbury, Charles Dickens and the Duke of Wellington. The principal architect on many of these dwellings was Henry Roberts who pioneered many types of model dwelling, working also with the Society for Improving the Condition of the Labouring Classes. Their model tenement won a prize at the Crystal Palace Exposition. Lewis Mumford writes that: "When compared with the quarters that had been built for workers up to this time, these dwellings were palatial. Judged by reasonable human standards, they were extremely cramped."

The Association’s work received international recognition at the Paris Universal Exhibition of 1867, where its housing models were awarded a gold medal; its secretary, Charles Gatliff, was also awarded a silver medal in connection with the exhibit.

By 1900, the MAIDIC was one of the largest model dwellings companies operating in London, housing over 6,000 individuals. Its activities declined as other model dwellings companies and the Greater London Council grew, which offered lower rents to a wider range of candidates.

The MAIDIC later became the Metropolitan Property Association.

== Buildings ==
- Metropolitan Buildings, St Pancras Square, Kings Cross (1848)
- Gibson Gardens, Stoke Newington (1880 - still existing) - named after Thomas Field Gibson
- Albert Street, Mile End New Town - exhibited for the Great Exhibition
- Gatliff Buildings, named after the MAIDIC’s secretary Charles Gatliff, developed in partnership with the Grosvenor Estate, Commercial Road (now Ebury Bridge Road), Pimlico (1867 - still existing as Gatliff Close)
- Albert Cottages, Stepney (1858 - still existing)
- Alexandra Cottages, Penge (still existing)
- Farringdon Road Buildings, Farringdon

== See also ==
- Model Dwellings Companies
- List of existing model dwellings
