= Belgrave, Cheshire =

Historical village at the entrance to Eaton Hall in Cheshire, England, United Kingdom

Coordinates: 53.14332°N 2.91996°W

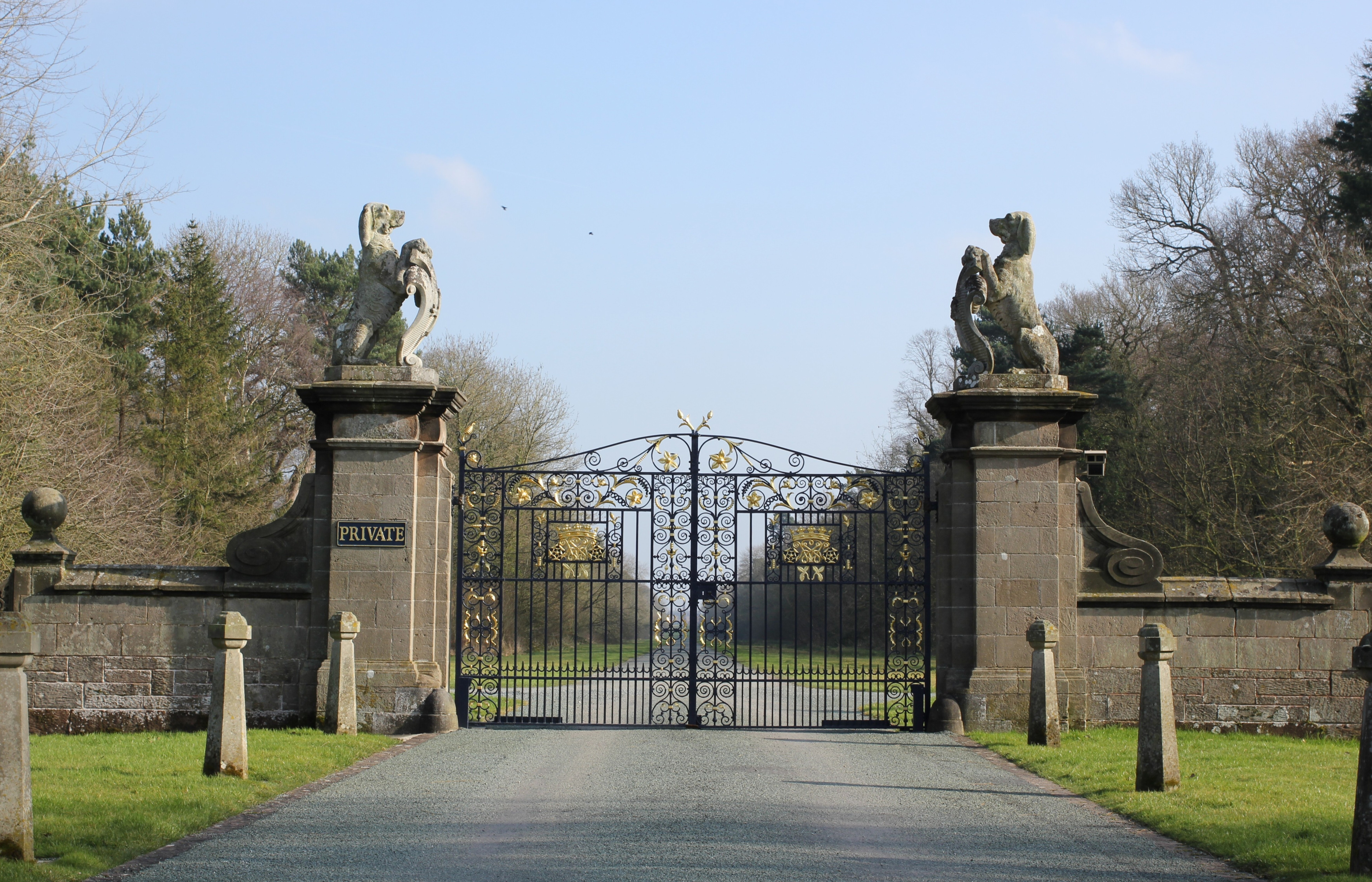
Entrance Gates to Belgrave Avenue that leads to Eaton Hall

Belgrave is a historic village in Cheshire, England. The area is part of the estates owned the Dukes of Westminster who have their seat at Eaton Hall, Cheshire. The village has a few houses and the Grosvenor Garden Centre. Belgrave Lodge is located at the western end of the 1.7 mi (2.7 km) main approach to Eaton Hall, which is known as the Belgrave Avenue. The name Belgrave is based on the Anglo-Saxon meaning for “beautiful grove”, which Normans replaced after the Conquest from the old name “Medregrave” which in Old French meant “filth grove”.

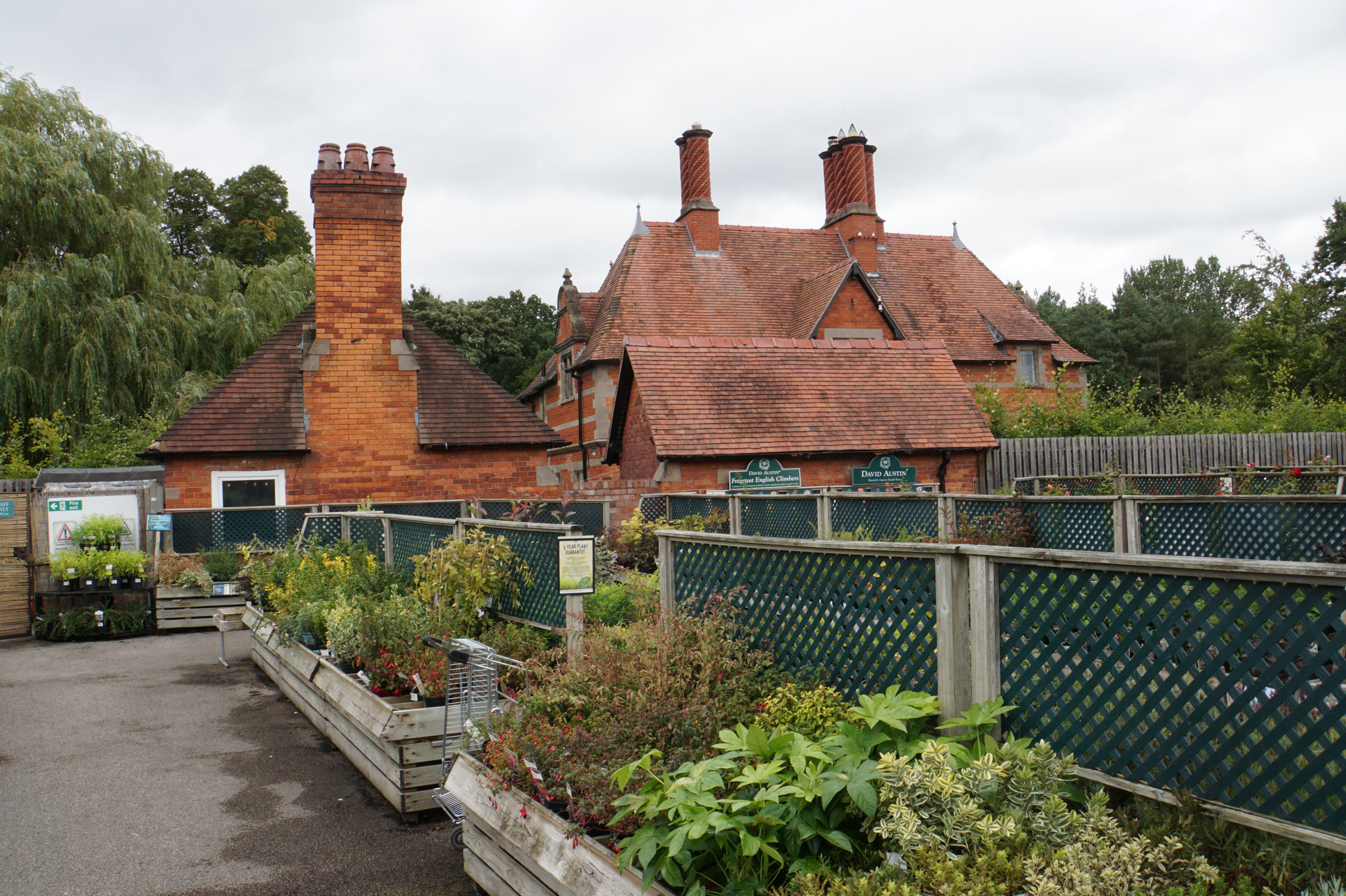
Grosvenor Garden Centre in Belgrave

The village is also one of the Duke of Westminster's subsidiary titles, Viscount Belgrave (1784) which is the source of the name of Belgravia in London, which was developed in the 1820s by Thomas Cubitt on land originally owned by Richard Grosvenor, 2nd Marquess of Westminster. Belgravia, which is one of the capital's most expensive districts, is characterised by grand terraces of white stucco properties. Many of the street names of Belgravia have a local connection to Cheshire such as Eaton Square (Eaton Hall), Chester Square (Chester), Kinnerton Street (Lower Kinnerton), and Eccleston Place (Eccleston).
