= Colony houses =

Model housing developments in Edinburgh, Scotland

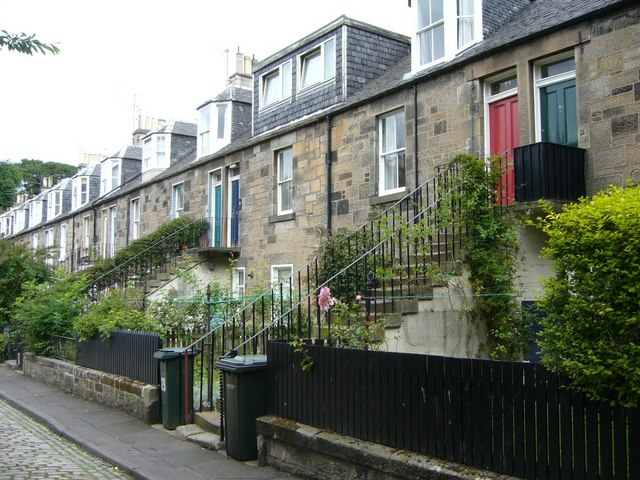
Colony houses on Collins Place, Stockbridge

The colony houses of Edinburgh were built between 1850 and 1910 as homes for artisans and skilled working-class families by philanthropic model dwellings companies. The first development was the Pilrig Model Buildings, near Leith Walk. Later developments across the city were built by the Edinburgh Cooperative Building Company Limited, founded in 1861. The founders of this company were influenced by the Reverend Dr. James Begg and the Reverend Dr. Thomas Chalmers, ministers of the Free Church of Scotland, who campaigned to improve the housing conditions of the poor.

== Description ==
Streets with colony houses are found in ten locations within Edinburgh:

- Abbeyhill
- Dalry Place, Haymarket
- Leith Links, Leith
- Lochend Road, Lochend
- North Fort Street, Leith
- Rosebank Cottages, Fountainbridge
- Shaw Colonies, Pilrig
- Shandon
- Slateford
- Stockbridge

The developments at Stockbridge, Dalry, Shaw Colonies, and Rosebank Cottages are category B listed buildings.

Characteristically, each flat originally had four rooms, a separate external toilet and a garden. Colony houses were built as double flats, upper and lower, with the upper flat's front door on the opposite side to the lower flat's front door, allowing each flat to have a front garden.

In some areas, many upper Cottage Flat owners have converted their attic space in to additional living accommodation resulting in the property being more reminiscent of colony houses. In some residential areas such as Colinton Mains, in Edinburgh, a majority of such accommodation has now been converted due to high property prices comparative to the cost of conversion.

== History ==
In 1849, the Pilrig Model Dwellings Company was formed by the Rev. William Garden Blaikie, minister for Pilrig, to build housing for the working classes. The scheme of 44 houses in four blocks was developed by architect Patrick Wilson, and built between 1850 and 1851. Originally known as the Pilrig Model Buildings, the streets were renamed Shaw's Place, Shaw's Street and Shaw's Terrace in 1896.

The second development was at Rosebank Cottages, and was designed by architect Alexander MacGregor for Sir James Gowans. The 36 houses in three rows were based on the Pilrig model, though they added the external stair which is characteristic of the later colonies.

In 1861, a group of builders found themselves locked out of their building sites due to a dispute about working hours. Their three-month ban led to the formation of The Edinburgh Co-operative Building Company Ltd (ECBC). This group comprised many different trades - stonemasons, plasterers, plumbers and others sympathetic to their aims. Central to its mission was a co-operative spirit that was reflected in its adoption of the beehive motif. The company's first site was at Glenogle Park, by the Water of Leith near Stockbridge, where the foundation stone was laid on 23 October 1861. The layout of 11 terraces took the Rosebank development as its prototype, and was mostly complete by 1872.

While the building lock out provided the opportunity for tradesmen to form a company, it was the poor state of housing in the old town which was the underlying stimulus for the foundation of the ECBC, whose stated intention was to build houses for sale to working people. A newspaper from 1870 reports:

"The entire capital [of the Company] is subscribed by 836 members, 400 houses supplying healthful accommodation for at least 2,000 individuals, have been built and sold for £70,000; and an average profit of over 15 per cent has been paid every year."

ECBC also constructed the Dalry Colonies at Haymarket, from 1868 to 1870, largely to house the employees of the Caledonian Railway. By 1911 over 2,000 houses had been constructed on eleven sites. Many were owned by the artisan classes in an era when mortgages did not exist. The earliest residents of the colonies were skilled workers and artisan builders and this remained the largest occupational group for much of the 20th century. The Abbeyhill colonies in particular had a number of railway workers due to the proximity of the area to the line. Persistence of inhabitants was also a key feature of colony life, which made for stable neighbourhoods. The design of the buildings did result in a certain amount of overlooking and gossiping, but this feature has also contributed to a sense of identity and community that is quite unique in Edinburgh.

== See also ==
- Cottage flat
- Rutherglen#Farme Cross, examples of same building style
- List of existing model dwellings
