= Thomas Field Gibson =

Unitarian silk manufacturer and philanthropist

Thomas Field Gibson FGS
- Born: 3 March 1803; Canonbury, London, England
- Died: 12 December 1889 (aged 86); Hampstead, London, England
- Scientific career
- Fields: Geology, palaeontology

Thomas Field Gibson FGS (3 March 1803 – 12 December 1889) was a Unitarian silk manufacturer and philanthropist. He supported several novel initiatives to enhance British manufacturing quality and international trade while improving life for working people during the Industrial Revolution – particularly in Spitalfields where his business was centred. He also made important contributions to geology.

== Life and family ==
He was born to Thomas Gibson Snr and Charlotte née Field (who was Sir Francis Ronalds' aunt) at 2 Canonbury Place Islington – his maternal grandparents and an aunt and uncle were living at No 6 and No 3 Canonbury Place respectively. His paternal grandfather (another Thomas Gibson – a laceman and banker) was associated with Sir Richard Arkwright’s commercialisation of mechanised cotton spinning through his brother-in-law Samuel Need.

Gibson's schooling was with Unitarian ministers John Potticary in Blackheath (where Benjamin Disraeli was a classmate) and James Tayler (father of John James Tayler) in Nottingham. In adulthood he resided in Bloomsbury; Hanger Lane, Wood Green; Elm House in Walthamstow (the birthplace of William Morris); Westbourne Terrace, Paddington; 10 Broadwater Down, Royal Tunbridge Wells; and finally in Fitzjohn's Avenue, Hampstead. He married twice: to Mary Anne Pett and then to Eliza Cogan, daughter of Unitarian schoolmaster Eliezer Cogan, and his only child, Mary Anne, was born the week before her mother and namesake died.

== Silk manufacture ==
Gibson became a freeman of the Weavers' Company and took over his father's silk manufacturing business in 1829. From his warehouse in Spital Square, work was put out to several hundred weaving families in the Spitalfields area. He also employed weavers in Halstead, Essex and was a partner in the Depot silk throwing mill in Derby.

=== Free trade ===
Like other industrialists of the period, Gibson believed in laissez-faire capitalism. He was an active member of the Anti-Corn Law League and supported Richard Cobden again in negotiating the Cobden-Chevalier Treaty in Paris, both of which had the goal of reducing import duties and promoting international trade.

== Community work ==
=== Education ===
Education, and in particular practical education of the artisans in his area, was of considerable interest to him. His father founded the Spitalfields Mechanics' Institution in early 1825, not long after the London Mechanics' Institution (now Birkbeck College) was opened, and Gibson served on its Committee. Not being a success, it was reoriented into the Eastern Literary and Scientific Institution, and Gibson was still its patron in the mid-1840s. Father and son also helped open and support a mission in Spitalfields with day and evening schools, adult education, a library, savings bank and benevolent fund, as well as pastoral visits to those in need.

Gibson was on the Council of the Government School of Design (now the Royal College of Arts) established in 1837 and spearheaded the early creation of a branch school of design in Spitalfields that achieved valuable results. He was then appointed to the Royal Commission of The Great Exhibition of 1851. In subsequent years he was a Juror at the Exposition Universelle (1855) and a British Commissioner at the International Exposition (1867), both held in Paris, and was awarded a Chevalier of the Legion of Honour. He also helped organise the Annual International Exhibitions held in London in the 1870s. Gibson was in addition a long-serving Councillor and benefactor of University College London and University College Hospital.

=== Public health ===
Gibson was a founding Director of the Metropolitan Association for Improving the Dwellings of the Industrious Classes, an early housing association that built affordable and sanitary accommodation for rent. The second complex constructed by the Association was at Spitalfields and was open for viewing as part of the Great Exhibition. Gibson Gardens, completed in 1880 in Stoke Newington, was named in honour of Gibson's extended contributions to the Association. He also served on the Metropolitan Commission of Sewers that directed the early work of engineer Joseph Bazalgette towards developing an integrated sewerage and drainage system across London.

== Palaeontology ==
Gibson was in addition "a patron of geology", being elected a fellow of the Geological Society of London in 1847 and serving on its Council. Staying at his beach house at Sandown on the Isle of Wight, he found the type specimen of an important extinct plant species at Luccombe Chine in 1856–57. Studied by Joseph Dalton Hooker, Director of the Kew Gardens, John Morris, the geology professor at University College London, and Unitarian scholar James Yates, it was then characterised by William Carruthers of the Natural History Museum, and later named Cycadeoidea gibsoniana after the finder. Gibson also presented a paper to the Geological Society on the Iguanodon femur he found on the island.

== Unitarian leadership ==
Like his extended family, Gibson held Unitarian beliefs. His father chaired the meeting on 26 May 1825 at which the British and Foreign Unitarian Association was formed to provide national co-ordination of Unitarian issues and both he and Gibson Snr presided at the annual meeting at different times. Gibson Snr was also part of the group that successfully lobbied Parliament in 1828 to repeal the Sacramental Test Act that prevented Nonconformists from holding public office, and chaired the controversial meeting of the committee of the South Place Chapel in 1834 that accepted the resignation of their minister William Johnson Fox – Fox had formed a close relationship with his ward Eliza Flower and separated from his wife. Gibson was on the South Place chapel committee as well.

He and his father were joint executors for the renowned Unitarian minister Thomas Belsham. Gibson helped his friend and third cousin Edwin Wilkins Field as a trustee of the Hibbert Trust for the first 25 years of its existence; its purpose was to support Nonconformist scholarship. He was also on Wilkin Field's committee that built University Hall as a memorial to the passing of the Dissenters' Chapels Act in 1844 and is now the home of Dr Williams's Library.
