= Charles Gatliff =

English solicitor and housing reformer

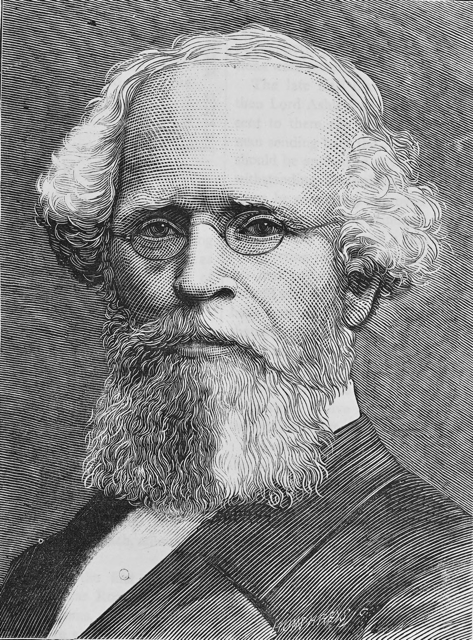
- Charles Gatliff, engraving from House and Home (1879)
- Born: September 13, 1810; Harrogate, Yorkshire, England
- Died: January 15, 1891 (aged 80); Hampstead, London, England
- Occupation: Solicitor
- Years active: c. 1835 - 1888

Charles Gatliff (13 September 1810 - 15 January 1891) was an English solicitor and a housing reformer associated with the model-dwellings movement in Victorian Britain. He was a founding member and long-serving Honorary Secretary of the Metropolitan Association for Improving the Dwellings of the Industrious Classes (MAIDIC), one of the earliest model dwelling companies established to provide improved housing for working-class tenants.

== Early life ==
Charles Gatliff was born in Harrogate, Yorkshire, on 13 September 1810, the son of Thomas Gatliff and Susanna Gatliff (née Nevins) of Leeds. He was educated in Leeds and moved to London at an early age.

== Career ==
Gatliff was admitted as a solicitor in 1835 and subsequently practised in the City of London. Contemporary directories record him as a partner in the firms of Gatliff & De Carteret and later Gatliff & Howse.

From the early 1840s, Gatliff was closely associated with the Metropolitan Association for Improving the Dwellings of the Industrious Classes, serving the organisation from its inception in 1841 until his retirement in 1888, thereafter continuing his association as a director.

=== Metropolitan Association for Improving the Dwellings of the Industrious Classes ===
==== Foundation ====
Gatliff was among the six individuals present at the meeting held on 15 September 1841 which resolved to establish an association for improving working-class housing on a self-supporting basis.

Following the Association's formation, Gatliff served on its provisional committee and as Honorary Secretary, helping to promote schemes for improving working-class housing and to secure a legal structure capable of attracting private investment. In December 1843, he and Thomas Southwood Smith jointly wrote a letter to Prime Minister Sir Robert Peel requesting an interview on behalf of the Association and seeking government assistance or privileges that might facilitate its objectives. He subsequently participated in deputations representing the Association before the Prime Minister and later before the President of the Board of Trade, Earl of Dalhousie, in connection with the Association's housing schemes and incorporation.

The Association received a royal charter of incorporation on 16 October 1845, with Gatliff as Honorary Secretary.

==== Secretaryship and organisational development ====
Gatliff remained closely involved in the administration and development of the Association for several decades. As Honorary Secretary he acted as one of its principal representatives in dealings with shareholders, professional bodies, local associations and government departments.

Under Gatliff's secretaryship the Association expanded beyond London. By the mid-1850s branches had been formed at Brighton, Dudley, Newcastle upon Tyne, Ramsgate, Southampton and Torquay, while further metropolitan and provincial branches were under consideration.

Gatliff participated in efforts to extend the Association's operations, and the published proceedings included his pamphlet Practical Suggestions on Improved Dwellings for the Industrious Classes, which set out practical recommendations based on the Association's experience.

==== Model-dwellings schemes ====
Gatliff was involved in the development of the Association's model-dwellings principles from its foundation. A resolution adopted at the first meeting in 1841 proposed the formation of an association "for the purpose of providing the labouring man with an increase of the comforts and conveniences of life, with full compensation to the capitalist".

The Association adopted a self-supporting model in which housing schemes were financed through private investment while providing improved accommodation for working-class tenants. Dividends to shareholders were limited to five per cent, and later historians described the approach as "five per cent philanthropy".

Gatliff wrote on the practical considerations of such schemes in 1854, drawing on more than a decade of experience. He discussed questions of site selection, building design, ventilation, sanitation, rents, tenant management and financial returns.

Gatliff returned to the subject in 1875 in his paper On Improved Dwellings and Their Beneficial Effect on Health and Morals, with Suggestions for Their Extension, in which he reviewed model-dwellings schemes, their reported benefits, and advocated their wider adoption.

Later studies of Victorian working-class housing have examined the principles advocated by Gatliff and their application in model-dwelling schemes.

During Gatliff's tenure, the Association expanded from its first development in Old St. Pancras Road in 1848 to estates in fifteen locations housing more than 7,000 tenants by the mid-1880s.

Gatliff Buildings (later Gatliff Close) and Gatliff Road in Pimlico were named after Gatliff. Richard Grosvenor, 2nd Marquess of Westminster had named the estate in recognition of Gatliff's "zeal" as secretary of the Metropolitan Association.

A commemorative plaque at Gibson Gardens recorded Gatliff as Secretary of the Association.

==== Housing advocacy and reform ====
In addition to his administrative work, Gatliff promoted improved working-class housing through public advocacy, committee work and published papers. In 1844 he publicly advocated the Association's principle of financing dwellings through investment capital while limiting returns to shareholders.

Gatliff later participated in discussions of housing reform through specialist committees and professional organisations. Reports of the Special Dwellings Committee established by the Charity Organisation Society in 1873 record Gatliff’s participation in meetings considering housing schemes, model dwellings and related legislation. He was also associated with organisations concerned with housing and public health, including the Health of Towns Association, and participated in committees and enquiries concerning sanitary aspects and water provision.

He argued that improved dwellings required adequate financial returns to attract investment, while distinguishing self-supporting schemes from purely charitable provision. He also acknowledged the limitations of investment-based schemes in accommodating the poorest tenants, for whom additional forms of assistance, including public support, might be required.

In 1875 Gatliff presented a paper to the Statistical Society of London reviewing more than three decades of experience in the provision, management and effects of improved dwellings.

In 1881 he gave evidence before a House of Commons Select Committee appointed to consider the operation of the Artisans' and Labourers' Dwellings Improvement Act 1875. His evidence described the Association's experience in providing housing for working-class tenants and formed part of the material considered in debates on housing policy. Gatliff later gave evidence before the Town Holdings Committee in 1887 on issues relating to model-dwellings finance, tenure, and the accommodation of working-class tenants.

Reporting on housing conditions in London in 1889, William Smart described Gatliff as "the veteran secretary of the company" and "a great authority on housing the poor".

==== Exhibitions and public recognition ====
The Association's work attracted the attention of leading figures interested in housing reform. On 4 July 1848, Prince Albert visited the Association's first block of dwellings in Old St. Pancras Road. According to contemporary and later accounts, he expressed his interest and signed the visitors' book.

The Association exhibited its work at major exhibitions during Gatliff's tenure. The Association's model dwellings and related exhibits were displayed at the Great Exhibition of 1851 and later at the Paris Universal Exhibition of 1867.

At the Paris exhibition the Association received a gold medal for its contribution to working-class housing, while Gatliff was awarded a silver medal in recognition of the plans, models and information supplied in support of the exhibit.

The directors attributed the award largely to Gatliff's efforts and resolved to recommend that the gold medal be presented to him as a testimonial of his services.

== Reputation and legacy ==
Gatliff retired from active involvement in the Metropolitan Association in 1888 after nearly five decades of service but remained associated as a director.

Reviewing the history of London's rehousing efforts in 1883, the Pall Mall Budget described him as having been "in the van" of the movement to improve housing for working people since the early 1840s.

After his death in 1891, the Solicitors Journal described him as a "pioneer of the movement for improving the dwellings of the poor", while the Law Journal credited him with drawing public attention to the need for improved housing for the artisan classes.

Modern historians have likewise identified Gatliff as an important figure in the Association. John Richardson described the MAIDIC as the "brainchild" of Gatliff and his associates, while Anthony Wohl characterised him as a "directing force" within the organisation during its period of expansion. David Owen described Gatliff as the "moving spirit" behind the Association, noting that his long secretaryship made his name almost synonymous with the organisation.

== Personal life ==
Charles Gatliff married Elizabeth Withers in 1851. The couple lived with their family in London and at various times resided in Stoke Newington and Hampstead.

Gatliff died at his residence in Hampstead on 15 January 1891, aged 80.

== Publications ==
- Gatliff, C. "Dwellings for the Poor in London". The Morning Chronicle, no. 23396, 22 October 1844.
- Gatliff, C. "On Dwellings for the Working Classes". The Times, 5 August 1852.
- Gatliff, C. Practical Suggestions on Improved Dwellings for the Industrious Classes. London, 1854.
- Gatliff, C., et al. "Dwellings for the Labouring Classes". The Examiner, no. 3078, January 1867, p. 60.
- Gatliff, C. "On Improved Dwellings and Their Beneficial Effect on Health and Morals, with Suggestions for Their Extension". Journal of the Statistical Society of London, vol. 38, no. 1, March 1875, p. 33.
- Gatliff, C. "Artisans' Dwellings". Supplement to The Architect, June 1876, pp. 9–12.
- Gatliff, C. "Dwellings for the Wage-Classes". The Sanitary Record, vol. 17, September 1885, p. 125.

== See also ==
- Metropolitan Association for Improving the Dwellings of the Industrious Classes
- Model dwellings
