= South London Dwellings Company =

Model dwellings company

The South London Dwellings Company (SLDC) was a philanthropic model dwellings company, founded in London in 1879 during the Victorian era by the prominent social reformer Emma Cons.

Cons was an active philanthropist in the late nineteenth century, having also founded Morley College, the Working Girls Home (a hostel in Drury Lane) and the Home for Feeble-Minded girls in Bodmin, Cornwall, re-opening the Old Vic theatre (assisted by her niece, Lilian Baylis), and being actively engaged with the cause of women's suffrage. The SLDC was born out of Cons' work with the housing manager and philanthropist Octavia Hill – Cons worked as a rent-collector in Hill's housing schemes at Barrett Court, Oxford Street, from 1864.

== Buildings ==
The SLDC's main building was the quadrangle-form Surrey Lodge, built in 1884 near Waterloo station on the site of Sir James Wyatt's former home. Cons ran the building personally and in addition to housing, the building included a sanatorium, library, evening classes and day nurseries. "On one side of a quadrangle is a high row of buildings and on the opposite side is a row of cottages, which allows plenty of light and air to gain access to the higher edifices."

The building was managed on terms similar to Hill's and the East End Dwellings Company's, in which female rent-collectors befriended and maintained the welfare of residents. Surrey Lodge was destroyed during the Second World War.
