= Newcastle upon Tyne Improved Industrial Dwellings Company =

The Newcastle upon Tyne Improved Industrial Dwellings Company was set up by James Hall of Hall Brothers Steamship Company, Tynemouth, after visiting Sir Sydney Waterlow's establishment in London. A model dwelling company, it built 108 flats at Garth Heads between 1869 and 1878; the chairman, directors and shareholders were mostly prominent local businessmen. The company was wound up in 1968 and the buildings at Garth Heads are currently used for private student accommodation.
