= Model dwellings company =

Housing company

Model dwellings companies (MDCs) were a group of private companies in Victorian Britain that sought to improve the housing conditions of the working classes by building new homes for them, at the same time receiving a competitive rate of return on any investment. The principle of philanthropic intention with capitalist return was given the label "five per cent philanthropy".

== Background ==
The precursor to the aims of MDCs was the work of Edwin Chadwick and others in exposing the sanitary conditions of slums in large metropolitan areas. Once Chadwick's reforms had been implemented poverty remained rife in the overcrowded inner cities, and reformers had to look elsewhere for the solution to the problems of the working class. The publication of Engels' The Condition of the Working Class in England in 1844 and The Communist Manifesto, as well as fear of further uprisings such as that of the Chartists in 1848, increased concern for the welfare of the working class amongst the middle and upper classes.

== Model dwellings ==
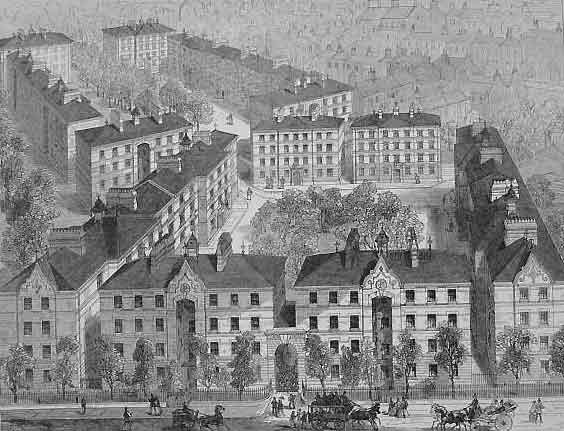
Peabody Square Model Dwellings in Blackfriars Road, Southwark.

Out of this environment, various societies and companies were formed to meet the housing needs of the working classes. Improved accommodation was seen as a way of ameliorating overcrowding, as well as the moral and sanitary problems resulting from that. The movement started in a small way in London, with the Metropolitan Association for Improving the Dwellings of the Industrious Classes and Society for Improving the Condition of the Labouring Classes finding difficulty in raising sufficient capital to build commercially viable projects. Support from public figures and demonstrations at the Great Exhibition all improved public awareness, if not raising investment.

The middle of the century saw the peak in MDC building, with around twenty-eight separate companies operating in London prior to the 1875 Cross Act. The movement picked up pace again after the Act, which granted local authorities the right to clear slum dwellings, however the entrepreneurial focus of the companies was restricted by an inability to make a competitive return and the intervention of large-scale municipal housing. The most successful builders post-1875 were those making a smaller return, such as the Four Per Cent Industrial Dwellings Company, and the East End Dwellings Company, often founded on religious principles as much as commercial.

== Companies ==
=== The Society for Improving the Condition of the Labouring Classes ===
The first of these companies was formed out of the Labourer's Friend Society, which in 1844 agreed to change its name and purpose towards building houses for labourers that might be adopted by others as a template. Their first urban building project was completed in 1846 at Bagnigge Wells, Pentonville, designed by Henry Roberts.

Although the Society for Improving the Condition of the Labouring Classes (SICLC) had the Prince Consort as its first president and contributed to the Great Exhibition of 1851, their block dwellings, in particular, were subject to criticism. The design of SICLC dwellings paid particular attention to sanitation and ventilation but was otherwise functional and utilitarian, and the resulting estate was seen as grim and unpleasant.

=== The Metropolitan Association for Improving the Dwellings of the Industrious Classes ===
The Metropolitan Association for Improving the Dwellings of the Industrious Classes (MAIDIC) was formed in 1841, earlier than the SICLC, but spent several years acquiring capital to begin its building projects. These commenced after the company obtained a royal charter which established the company on more commercial grounds, guaranteeing a minimum return of five per cent on investment. This was outlined in the company's resolution:

That an association be formed for the purpose of providing the labouring man with an increase of the comforts and conveniences of life, with full return to the capitalist.

The first MAIDIC blocks were completed in 1848, constituting twenty-one two room apartments and ninety three room apartments in Old St Pancras Road, again on an 'associated' model - that is, with shared amenities such as lavatories and kitchen. This type of large, block residence with shared facilities became the norm for model dwellings companies.

The MAIDIC was one of the largest MDCs and by 1900 housed over 6,000 people.

=== The Peabody Trust ===
The Peabody Trust was founded after an unprecedented donation in 1862 of £150,000, by the American banker George Peabody for the good of the poor in London. A committee was set up to choose the most appropriate way to spend the money, and it was decided to build a number of block dwellings for the very poorest of the city. These apartments were of similar design to other companies, but rents were offered at lower levels, leading to complaints from other MDCs. Tenancy in a Peabody Dwelling came with strict rules: rents had to be paid weekly and punctually, and many trades were not permitted to be carried on at the dwellings. There was also a night-time curfew and a set of moral standards to be adhered to.

=== The Improved Industrial Dwellings Company ===
The largest MDC working in central London was the Improved Industrial Dwellings Company (IIDC), founded by Sir Sydney Waterlow in 1863, which housed around 30,000 individuals by 1900. Its rigorous selection procedure, rules and financial regulations meant that the IIDC was one of the more financially successful of these firms.

=== The Artizans', Labourers' and General Dwellings Company ===
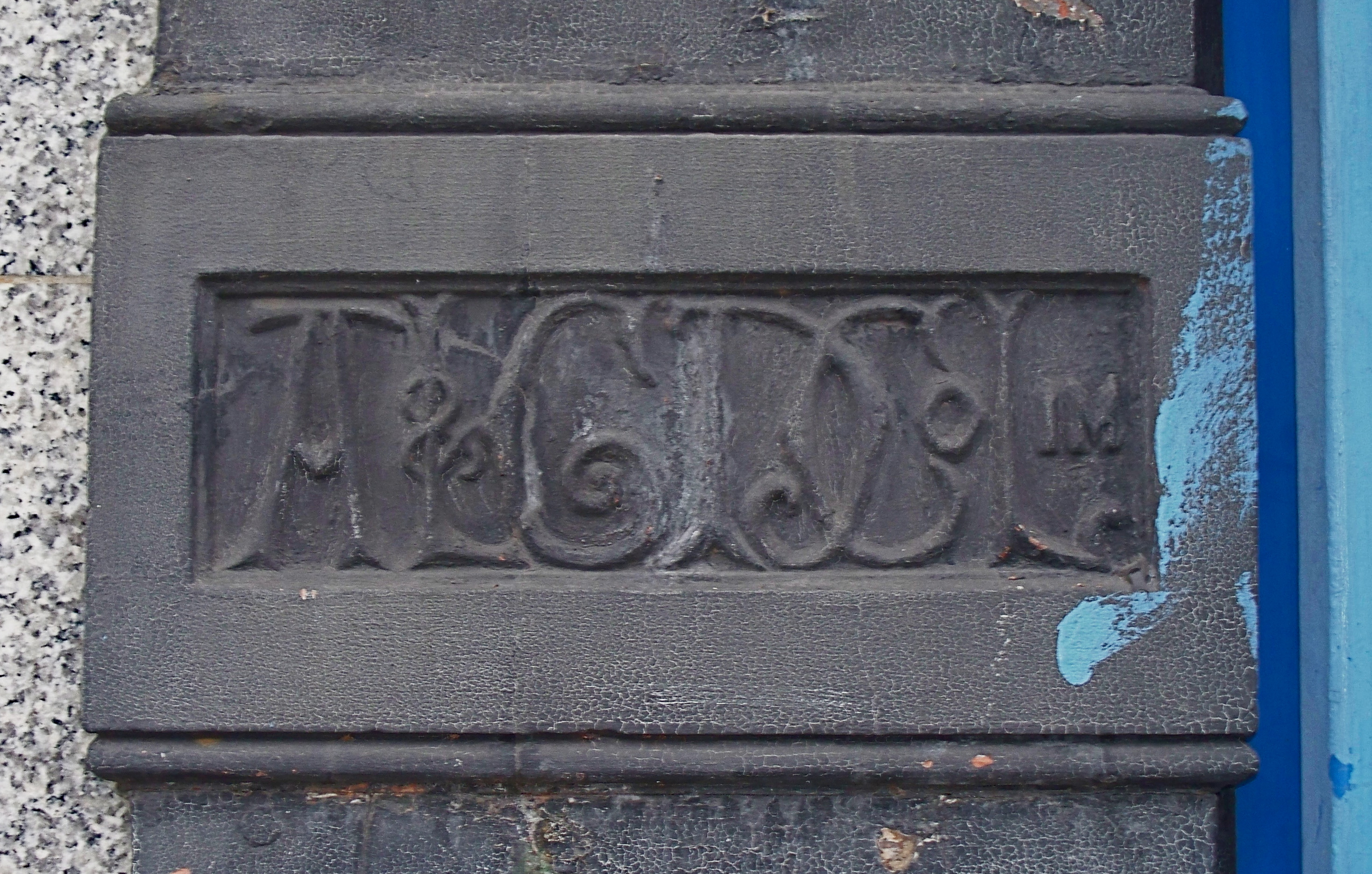

The Artizans' Company became one of the largest of the MDCs, concentrating on suburban, low-rise estates rather than the central, high-rise model of other companies. It was founded by a former labourer, William Austin, in 1867 and immediately set about building and selling model dwellings first in Battersea, then Salford, Gosport and elsewhere. Their first major contribution to the MDC movement came at Shaftesbury Park in Battersea, a large, suburban estate opened by Lord Shaftesbury in 1872 as a "workmen's city" for "clerks, artisans and labourers". Building continued at a larger estate in Kilburn, Queen's Park, then a still larger estate at Hornsey, Noel Park, and finally Leigham Court in Streatham. The company also diversified into block dwellings and other, more commercially minded estates such as Pinnerwood Park near Harrow.

By 1900, the Artizans' Company provided dwellings for 42,000 people in over 6,400 residences

=== East End Dwellings Company ===
The EEDC was founded in 1882 by a committee from the parish of St Jude, Whitechapel, headed by Canon Samuel Barnett. The company was one of the most successful providers of housing to the very poor in the East End of London, being founded along religious lines rather than being preoccupied with capital return on investment, which was the biggest reason behind the lack of success of earlier builders.

Following Octavia Hill's principles of female residence managers, the company employed female rent collectors including Beatrice Potter (later Webb, co-founder of the London School of Economics) and Ella Pycroft. The company built a large number of dwellings in what is now the London Borough of Tower Hamlets, starting with Katharine Buildings in 1885.

=== Four Per Cent Industrial Dwellings Company ===
The Four Per Cent Company was founded by a group of Anglo-Jewish philanthropists in 1885, headed by the banker Nathan Rothschild, 1st Baron Rothschild. They built large residences across Spitalfields and Whitechapel, later branching out towards Hackney and South London, with a remit to provide (although not exclusively) for destitute Jews in the East End.

The company later renamed itself the Industrial Dwellings Society (1885) Ltd., and is today known as IDS.

=== Other companies ===
There were a large number of companies operating in the nineteenth century, particularly in London, around twenty-eight at the time of the Cross Act. Other names include the South London Dwellings Company (founded by Emma Cons), the Chelsea Park Dwellings Company, the National Dwellings Society, the City and Central Dwellings Company, the London Labourers' Dwellings Society (founded by William Alexander Greenhill), the Real Property Investment Association and later the Guinness Trust, Lewis Trust and Sutton Trust.

Outside of London, the Pilrig Model Dwellings Company and Edinburgh Co-Operative Building Company were active in Edinburgh, Scotland, building a number of what have come to be referred to as colony houses. Other companies, such as the Chester Cottage Improvement Company and the Newcastle upon Tyne Improved Industrial Dwellings Company built in specific areas only. Other buildings were erected by individuals, such as Hugh Jackson's New Court, in Camden Town, London, and Sir James Gowans' Rosebank Cottages in Edinburgh.

The Newcastle upon Tyne Improved Industrial Dwellings Company was set up by James Hall of Hall Brothers Steamship Company, Tynemouth, after visiting Sir Sydney Waterlow's establishment in London. It built 108 flats at Garth Heads between 1869 and 1878; the chairman, directors and shareholders were mostly prominent local businessmen. The company was wound up in 1968 and the buildings at Garth Heads are currently used for private student accommodation.

== Other schemes ==
=== Baroness Burdett Coutts ===
Baroness Burdett-Coutts was a private philanthropist who gave to many and varied charitable endeavours. One of the most significant private inputs into the provision of working class housing was Columbia Square in Bethnal Green, a block estate completed in 1857. Architecturally, it was a precursor to the imposing Peabody Dwellings, having been designed by Peabody's architect, Henry Darbishire. The addition of a grand marketplace modelled on Saint Chapelle in Paris made the design distinct, but the project was seen overall as a failure, finally being demolished in 1960.

== Criticism and support ==
=== Contemporary ===
The MDC movement was strongly supported by individuals like Lord Shaftesbury, who was president of the Artizan's Company for some time, for providing a plan to "completely alter for the better the domiciliary habits of the people of the metropolis". Others, such as Engels, criticised the movement as "Proudhonist", and a means of ensuring the longevity of capitalism through a process of embourgeoisement.

=== Other ===
In the twentieth century and beyond, opinions over the MDC movements have tended towards two positions. The first, adopted by free market economists, asserts that the financial success of some of these companies shows that they could have been a significant help to the poor, if their operation was not interrupted by the arrival of social housing in the form of London County Council estates. Others argue that the failure of MDCs to meet the needs of the very poorest demonstrates that they were a stepping stone towards the inevitable necessity of state intervention to solve the housing crisis. MDCs have been particularly criticised for failing to provide for the very poorest of society, concentrating on the labour aristocracy, the upper strata of the working classes.

== See also ==
- List of existing model dwellings
- Prince Albert's Model Cottage
