= Labourer's Friend Society =

Society for Improving the Condition of the Labouring Classes
- Company type: Public
- Industry: Housing
- Predecessor: Labourer's Friend Society
- Founded: 1830
- Founder: Lord Shaftesbury
- Defunct: 1965
- Fate: Acquired by Peabody Trust
- Successor: 1830 Housing Society
- Headquarters: London
- Key people: Albert, Prince Consort (patron)
- Products: Model dwellings

The Labourer's Friend Society was a society founded by Lord Shaftesbury in the United Kingdom in 1830 for the improvement of working class conditions. This included the promotion of allotment of land to labourers for "cottage husbandry" that later became the allotment movement, which the Society campaigned for after the Swing riots of 1830 as "the most plausible remedy for the social problems of the countryside". It published the Labourer's Friend Magazine, and in 1844 changed its title to the Society for Improving the Condition of the Labouring Classes, becoming the first Model Dwellings Company in 1844.

The Society received support from many influential figures of the time, including Montagu Burgoyne, Sir William Miles, Mary Ann Gilbert and Lord Ashley, who was the primary influence behind the transition of the Society into a more powerful body. The new Society had the patronage of Queen Victoria, the Prince Consort as president and Ashley as chairman. The company's architect was Henry Roberts, best known for Fishmongers' Hall in London.

In 1959, the company became the 1830 Housing Society, which was taken over in 1965 by the Peabody Trust.

== Buildings ==
Roberts's buildings made the SICLC a high-profile company with royal patronage and a display at the Great Exhibition; however, functional, utilitarian design of Roberts's buildings led to criticism that they were grim and unpleasant.

Buildings included:

- Model Buildings, Bagnigge Wells, Pentonville for 23 families, and 30 aged women
- George Street, Bloomsbury, for 104 single men
- Streatham Street, Bloomsbury, for 48 families
- 76 Hatton Garden, for 57 single women
- 2 Charles Street, Drury Lane, for 82 single men
- A small lodging-house also for men, in King Street, Drury Lane
- Turner Court, Hull

== See also ==
- List of existing model dwellings
