= Emma Cons =

British social reformer, educationalist, and theatre manager (1838–1912)

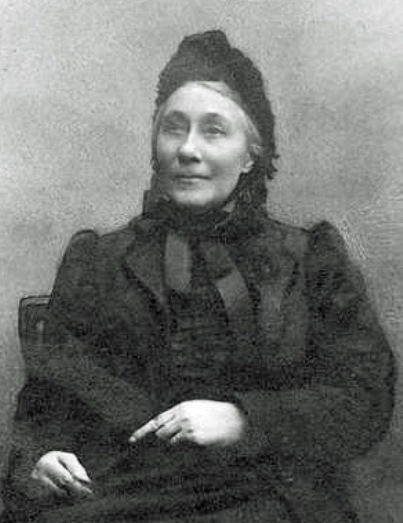
Emma Cons in 1897

Emma Cons (4 March 1838 – 24 July 1912) was a British social reformer, strongly committed to women's suffrage. She also campaigned for educational opportunities for the working class, including cheap tickets to Shakespearean drama at the Old Vic Theatre, which she opened in 1880, later managed by her niece, Lilian Baylis.

== Early life ==
Born in St. Pancras, London, she trained as an artist and joined the Ladies' Co-operative Art Guild in London, run by Caroline Hill, mother of the future housing reformer and founder of the National Trust, Octavia Hill. As Cons's father Frederick Cons was suffering from ill health, she needed to work and the Guild helped her get work as an illuminator as well as restoring manuscripts for John Ruskin. Cons also tried working as a watch engraver, and as a stained glass designer, but experienced harassment from men who resented a woman working amongst them.

From 1864, Cons worked for Octavia Hill as a rent collector, starting work at Barrett's Court, Oxford Street. Later Cons moved to South London, and in 1879 she established the South London Dwellings Company around Surrey Lodge, Lambeth, near to Waterloo station.

== Political career ==
In 1889, Cons became the first female alderman on the London County Council (LCC), working alongside the first elected women members Jane Cobden (elected for Bow and Bromley) and Lady Sandhurst (elected for Brixton). The elections were challenged by anti-suffragists, but as Cons had not been elected, she had been asked by the LCC Progressives to become an alderman, and it was difficult to challenge her position.

When she voted, however, she became liable for a fine: De Souza v. Cobden, which reached the Court of Appeal in 1891, ruled Cobden and Cons could legally be members of the council but could not vote. After this, Cons' commitment to the cause of women's suffrage was energetic, and she served on the Committee for the Return of Women as Councillors, became Vice-President of the Women's Local Government Society, and Vice President of the Women's Liberal Federation.

== Educationalist ==
Cons also helped found Swanley Horticultural College (which amalgamated with Wye College later part of Imperial College London, a part of University of London before closure in 2009), in 1892, the first such college for women, and she founded Morley College for working men and women, aided by money donated by Bristol based millionaire manufacturer and philanthropist, Samuel Morley.

Cons also founded the Working Girls Home, a hostel in Drury Lane, London, and she established various crèches and clinics for women including what was described as 'the Home for Feeble-Minded girls' at Bodmin.

== Cultural heritage ==
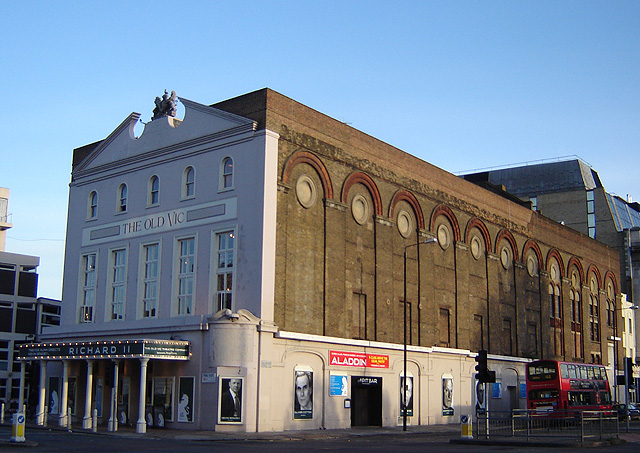
The Old Vic Theatre

In 1880, Emma Cons, re-opened what is now the Old Vic Theatre in Lambeth, south London, as the Royal Victoria Coffee and Music Hall. It was "a cheap and decent place of amusement on strict temperance lines". Through this initiative, she brought the plays of William Shakespeare and also opera to working class people.

In 1882, Samuel Morley began to take an interest in the affairs of the theatre, and in 1884 he joined the executive committee. He contributed a large amount of money to the scheme, and his business advice was of value. Morley College developed from the lectures given at the Old Vic.

In 1896, Cons devoted her autumn holiday in Cyprus to trying to help refugee Armenians, who had fled from persecution in Turkey. In 1908, Cons became the first woman to speak at the Institute of Directors, on behalf of the South London Dwellings Company.

== Personal life ==
Emma Cons died on 24 July 1912, of a cerebral haemorrhage, at Chippen's Bank, Hever, Kent, home of her friend, Ethel Everest. She is memorialised on the Cons family grave on the western side of Highgate Cemetery which also contains two members of the Baylis family.

Her niece, Lilian Baylis (1874–1937), assisted in running the Old Vic. Her sister, Ellen Cons (1840–1920), was also closely associated with many philanthropic schemes, and was one of the governors of the Old Vic.

== Plaques to Emma Cons ==
Plaques honouring Emma Cons are displayed outside the Old Vic on the corner with Waterloo Road and in the basement area bar. The Waterloo Road plaque reads:

Emma Cons (1837-1912), founder of ‘The Vic’, and alderman of the First London County Council, was a pupil of Ruskin. She gave up the life of an artist to focus on social work, and deeply sympathised with those who lacked many of the good things of life. She worked to improve housing for working men and women, to provide wholesome and joyous recreation at a low price, to promote education, to protect infant life, and to bring a human touch to the children in the industrial schools of her day. To such beneficent ends she gave her very self. Large-hearted and clear-sighted, courageous, tenacious of purpose and of great personal modesty, her selfless appeal drew out the best in others and was a constant inspiration for service to all with whom she was associated.

This was unveiled in 1929 by the Duchess of York (later Queen Elizabeth, The Queen Mother).

Another round blue plaque was put up by the Greater London Council, on the street wall of 136 Seymour Place, Marylebone, where she lived and worked. Today, the building is WLM Seymour Place.
