= Shandon, Edinburgh =

Suburb of Edinburgh, Scotland

Coordinates: 55°55′59″N 003°13′46″W

Shandon is an area of Edinburgh within North Merchiston approximately three miles west of the centre of Edinburgh. It is bounded by Slateford Road to the north, Harrison Road to the east, the Union Canal to the south and the Glasgow-Edinburgh Shotts Line and Suburban rail lines to the west.

== Etymology ==
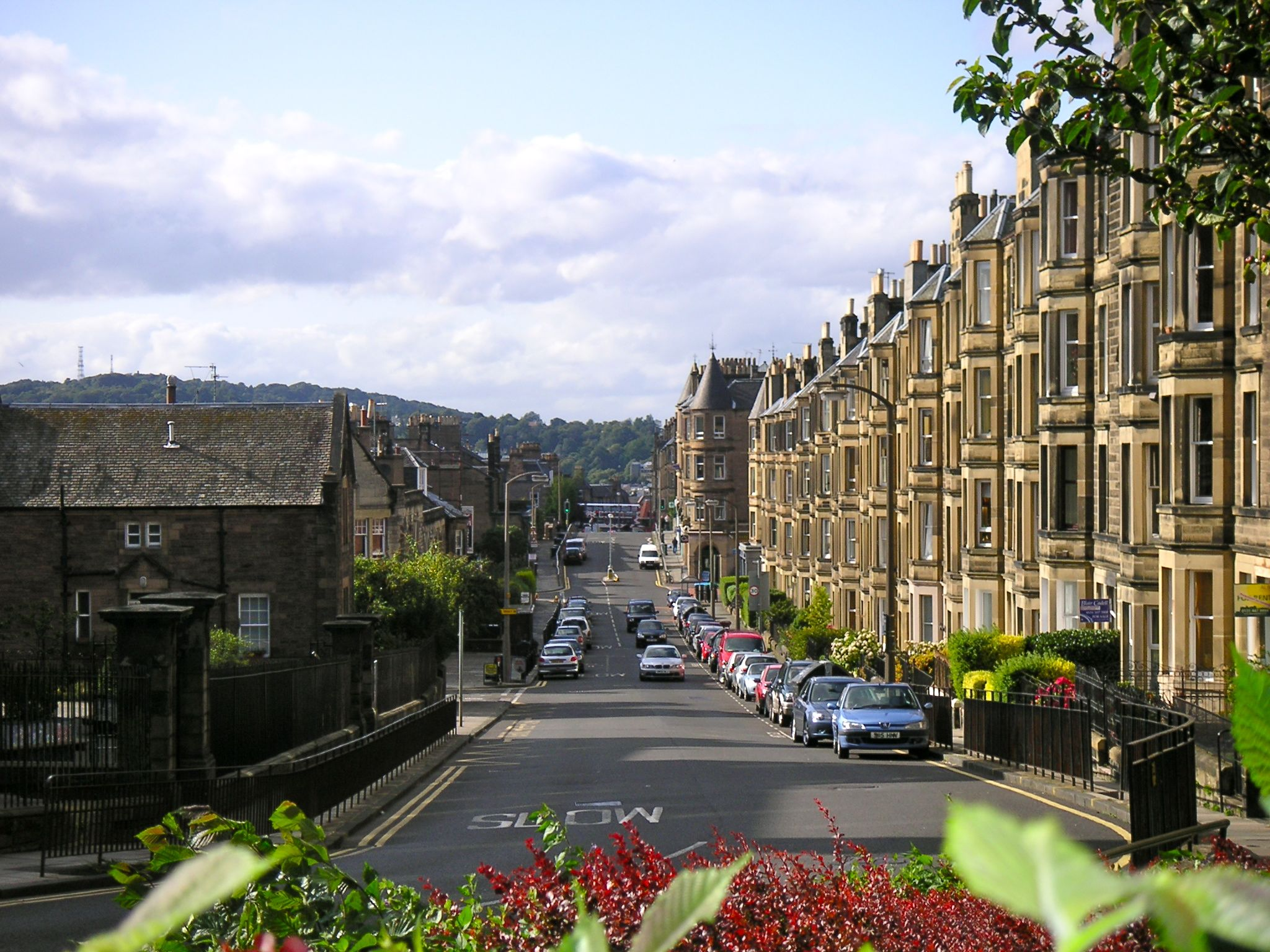
Ashley Terrace, Shandon

Harris states that the name is presumably related to Shandon on the Gareloch, near Helensburgh, built by the marine engineer Robert Napier in 1851.

== Shandon Conservation Area ==
Shandon contains the Shandon Conservation Area, which was originally designated on 29 March 1996. The conservation area is bound to the northwest by the Glasgow-Edinburgh rail line, to the northeast by Ashley Terrace and Shandon Place, to the southeast by the rear boundary walls of the rear gardens of Cowan Road and to the southwest by the Edinburgh suburban railway line. The conservation area has two distinct areas which are separated by a former Caledonian railway line. To the south, the ‘Shaftesbury Park’ colonies which were built in 1883-1904 and to the north, there is the smaller Shandon housing development which was built in 1880-1883.

=== Origins ===
Historical maps show that the land now covered by the Shandon Conservation Area, prior to development was open farmland. In 1880-1883, Shandon Crescent/Place/Road/Terrace/Street developed as an area comprising larger terraced dwellings and a small number of large detached villas. This housing development was built to cater for lower middle class families.

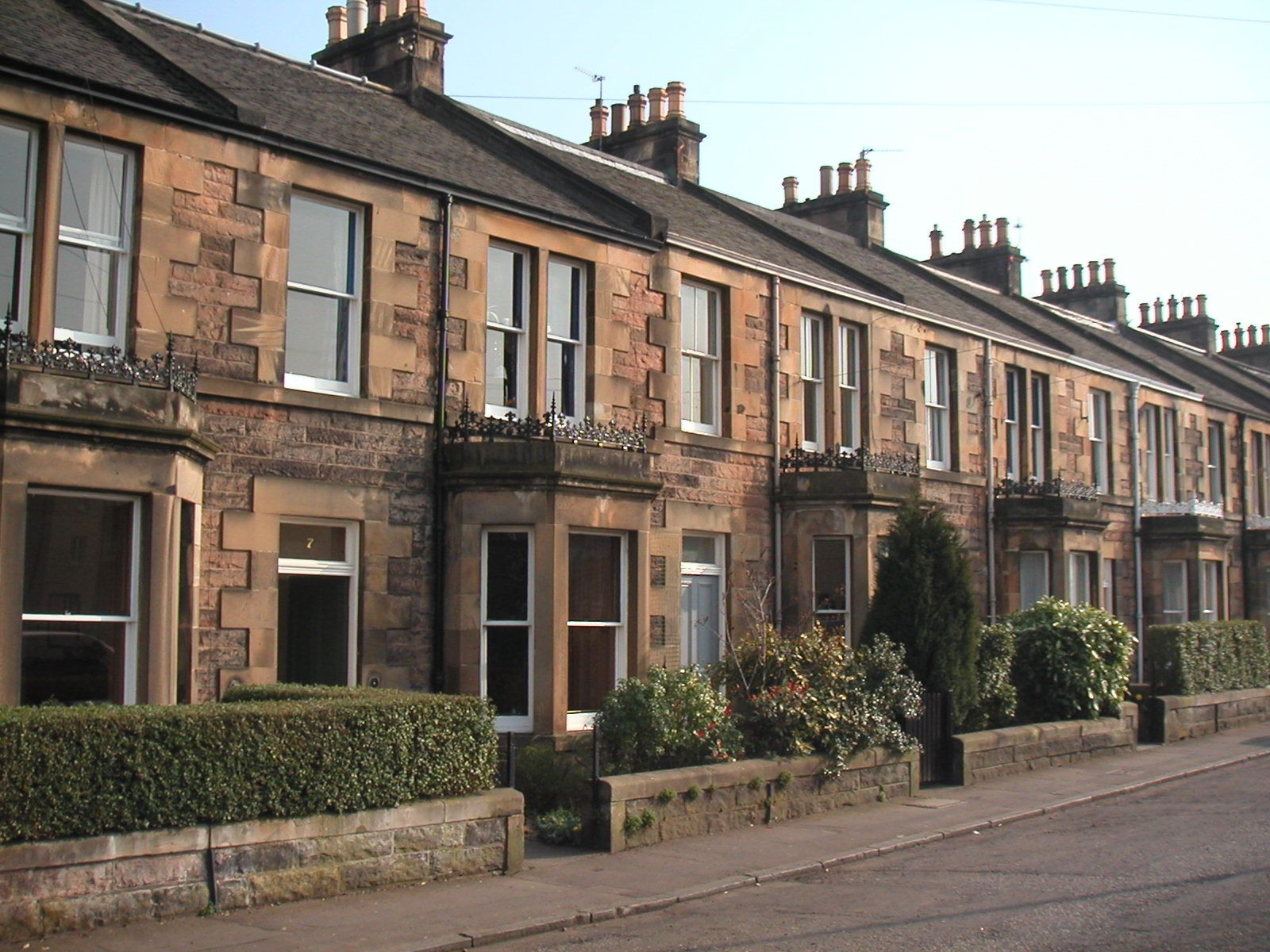
Shandon Crescent

In 1883, a 10-acre (40,000 m^{2}) site to the south of the former Caledonian Railway was bought by the Edinburgh Co-Operative Building Company (ECBC). The site was formerly in the possession of George Watson's Hospital and was known as Shaftesbury Park. Between 1883 and 1904, the ECBC built 330 houses at Shaftesbury Park. Similarly, as in Shandon, the type of social class that the Shaftesbury Park housing was aimed at lower-middle-class families. In the mid-19th century, Scottish housing reformers sought an alternative to the traditional tenement and there was a deliberate movement to find a working-class housing pattern which broke with the tradition and gave every family a front door and its own garden. The development of artisan housing in Scotland was pioneered in Edinburgh with a scheme by Patrick Wilson for the Pilrig Model Dwelling Company. This was the first colony-type development in Edinburgh. In 1857, the Rosebank Cottages were developed by James Gowans, and were modelled from the Pilrig System.

The form and layout of the Rosebank Cottages provided a prototype for a number of Colony developments by the Edinburgh Co-operative Building Company. The company was formed in April 1861 by a group of Edinburgh building workers with its principal aim being to improve living standards amongst the working classes. To achieve this, the ECBC provided affordable housing to encourage home ownership through access to mortgage finance. At Shaftesbury Park, the social emphasis shifted away from housing predominantly artisans, to lower middle classes.

== The Electrical Exhibition of 1890 at Shandon ==
It was primarily to demonstrate progress in electrical science that a huge exhibition was opened on 1 May 1890 at Slateford on land lying between the Caledonian main line and the Union Canal. Both the Caley and the North British opened special temporary stations nearby to cater for the large crowds who flocked to see the exhibition throughout that summer. The Caley station was situated midway between Merchiston and Slateford, the North British station on the adjacent suburban railway which the NB had acquired in 1885 The Caley's exhibition station was served by a half-hourly service of trains throughout the day, the first leaving Princes Street at 10:15 am. Return services left the exhibition station on the hour and the half-hour, the last train of the day arriving back at Princes Street at 11 pm. Passengers travelling from stations on the Leith branch could purchase special tickets which included the price of admission to the exhibition. The station was on a short purpose-built branch in effect, the use of which was strictly controlled by tablet working. When the exhibition closed after the summer the station was dismantled and the four block instruments sold off. While the original idea behind the International Industrial Exhibition had been to illustrate progress in electrical science, by the time it opened its scope had been enlarged to include mechanical science and even fine arts. The main building faced the Union Canal and was 700 ft long (210 m) and 250 ft wide (76 m), being divided into wings comprising nine courts each. In between was a concert hall seating 3,000 people complete with orchestra and organ. To the east across the suburban railway - over which a pedestrian bridge was erected - was the machinery hall with a locomotive annexe. The buildings cost £50,000 in all and were electrically lit. The exhibition was opened by the Duke and Duchess of Edinburgh whose procession travelled west along Dalry Road and up Ardmillan Terrace.

As The Scotsman reported: At Ardmillan Terrace, where the Exhibition first bursts into view, the scene was indeed a gay one. The roadway at each side from Harrison Park to the Exhibition was lined with Venetian masts, from which were suspended bannerets and shields. At intervals bright-coloured rows of streamers were stretched across the road. The numerous flags on the Exhibition buildings and others on private houses in the vicinity fluttered gaily in the breeze, and the brilliant sunshine added greatly to the effectiveness of a very pretty scene.

While the exhibition lasted the Union Canal enjoyed an Indian summer; electrically powered boats conveyed visitors from the site to Slateford and back for a fare of one halfpenny.

== St Michael's Parish Church ==
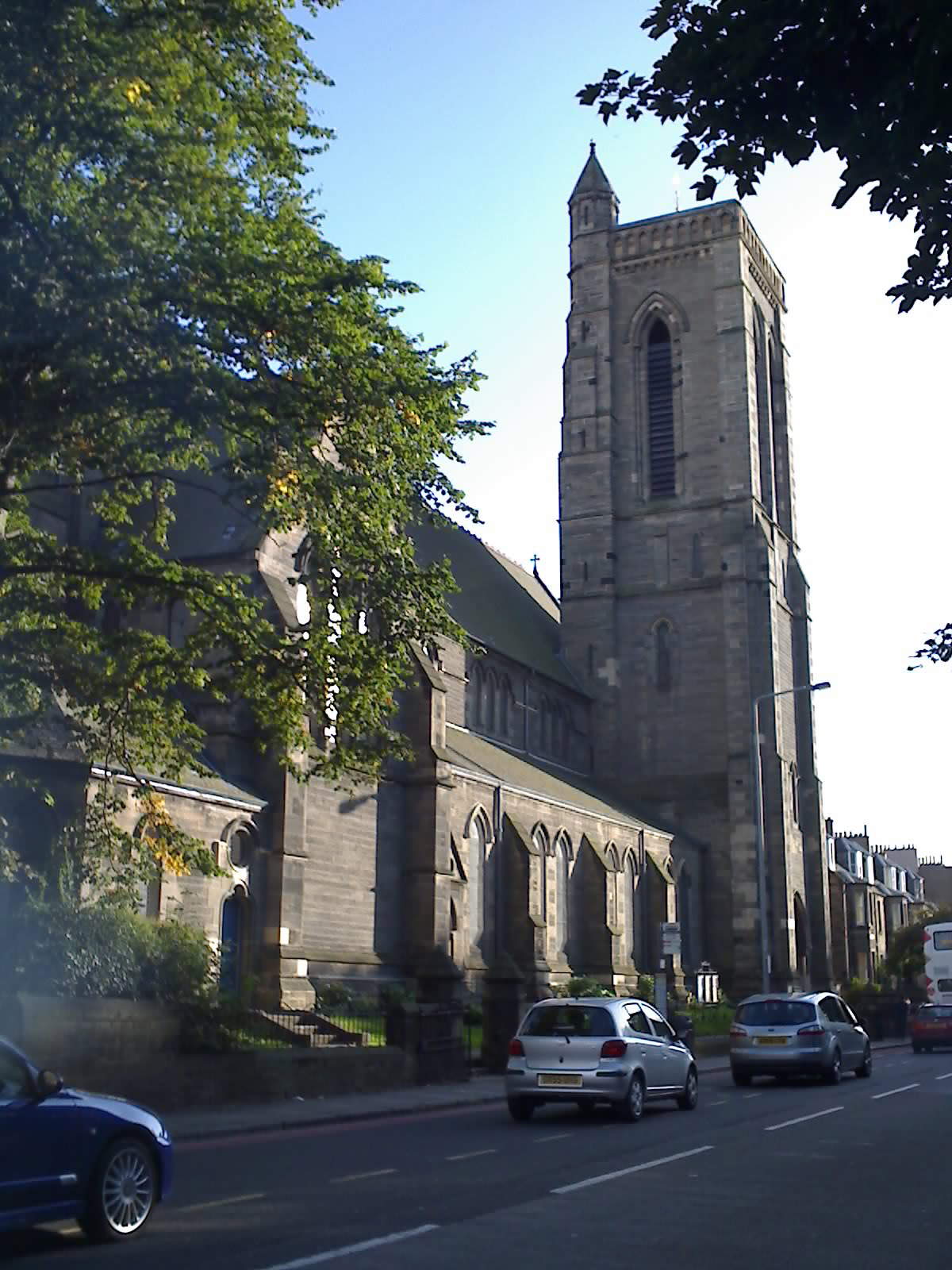
St Michaels, Slateford Road, Shandon

St Michael's Parish Church (Church of Scotland) on Slateford Road is in the Early English style and was described as "large and very perfect" by Gifford et al.

== Union Canal ==
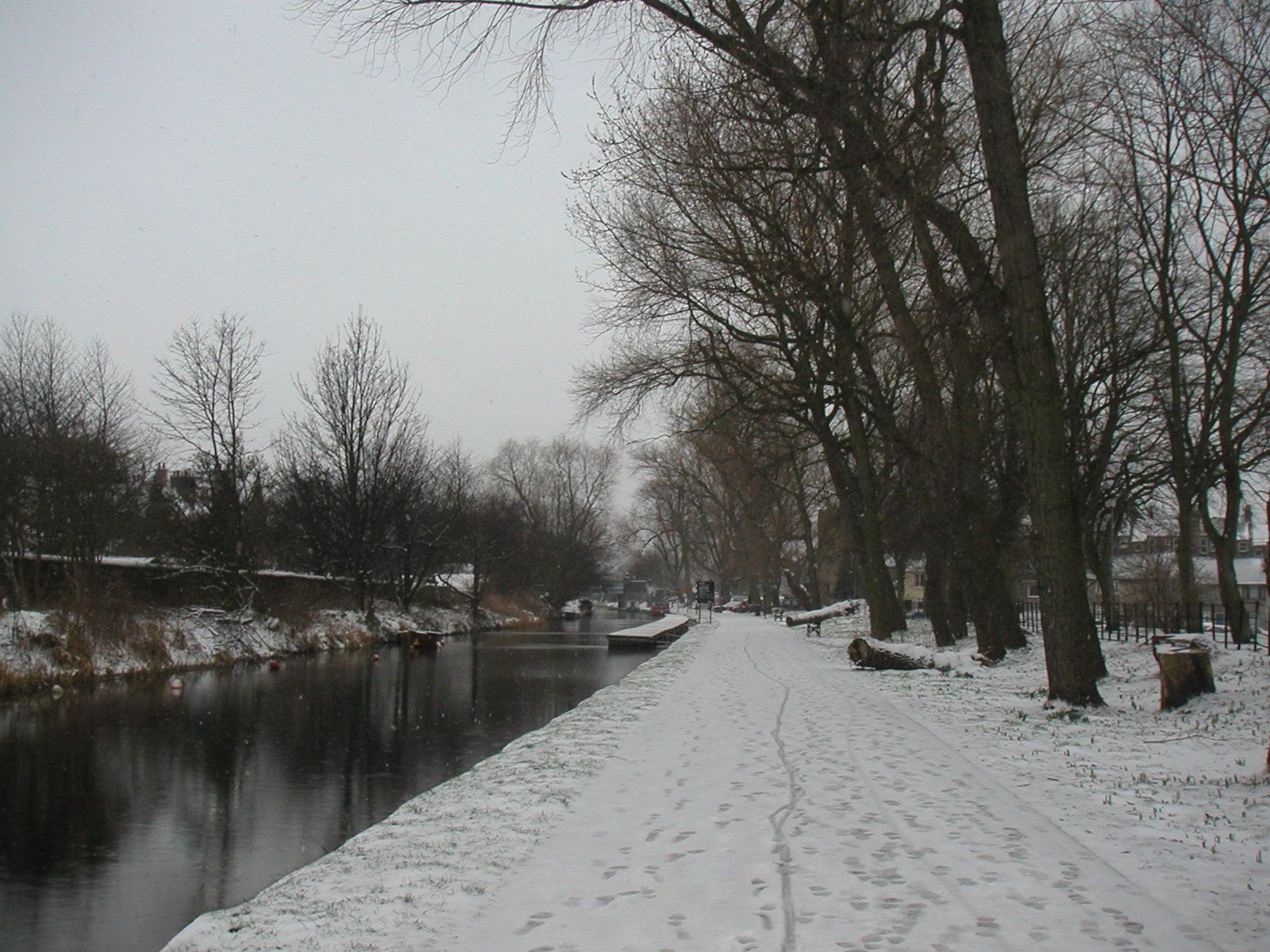
The Union Canal at Shandon in the snow

The Union Canal bounds Shandon to the South and the Edinburgh Canal Society main base is Ashley Terrace Boathouse at Lockhart Bridge.

== Caledonian Brewery ==
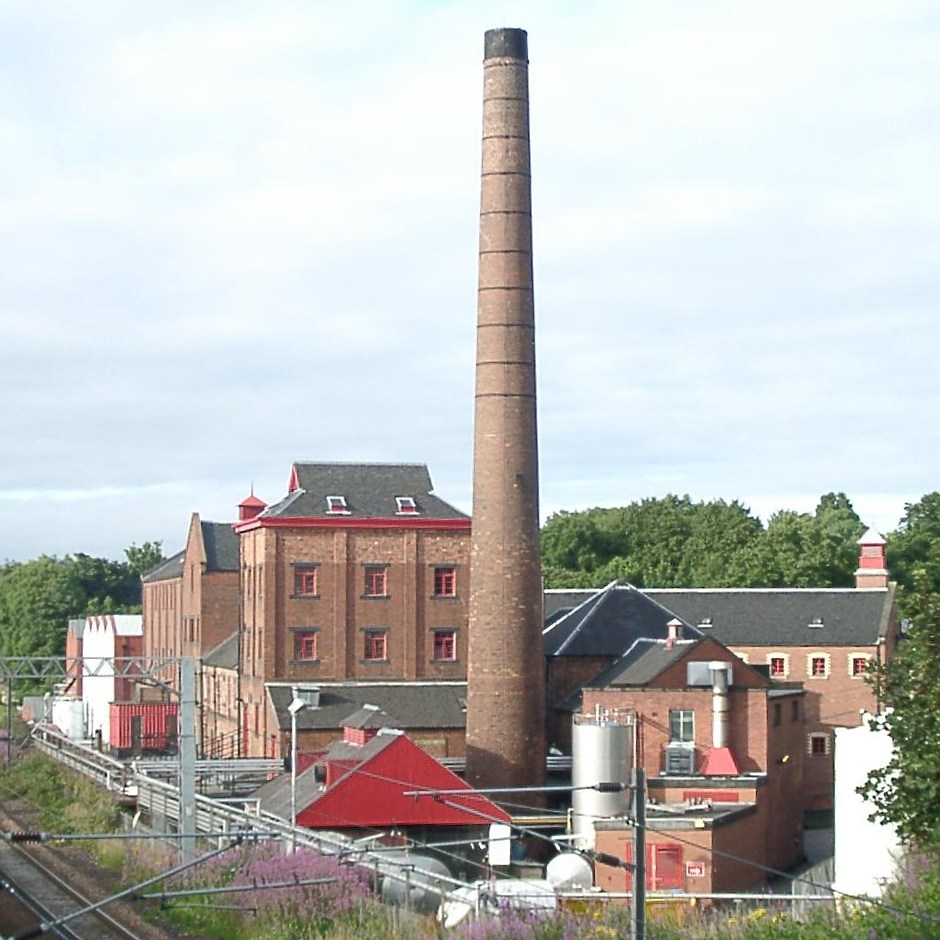
The Caledonian Brewery

The Caledonian Brewery, the only survivor of Edinburgh's old breweries, founded in 1869, lies on Slateford Road to the north of the area.
