= Streatham Street =

Street in Bloomsbury, London

Coordinates: 51.51720°N 0.12759°W

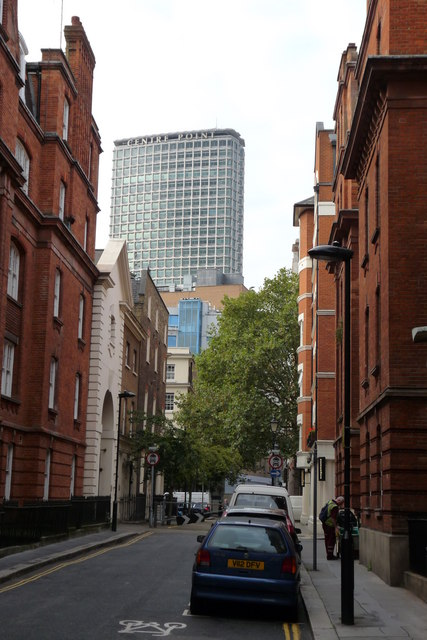
Streatham Street, London Picture taken from the junction with Coptic Street. Centre Point can be seen on the skyline., 2009

Streatham Street is a street in the London district of Bloomsbury, running between New Oxford Street and Great Russell Street. In the 19th century, the street was on the border of the "rookery" of St Giles, a slum, and became the location for new accommodation, which reformers planned would replace the slums.

Parnell House was built in the 1850s by Henry Roberts. Originally constructed by the Society of Improving the Condition of the Labouring Classes, the building was designed to reform the living conditions of slum residents. Whereas whole families had lived together in one room, now they could enjoy a more spacious living space. The Streatham Street apartments were the first multi level domestic building in the world. Subsequent buildings were erected by George Peabody, and Streatham Street was taken over by the Peabody Trust and modernised in later years.
