= Gibson Gardens =

Historic flats in Stoke Newington, London

Coordinates: 51.5637°N 0.0720°W

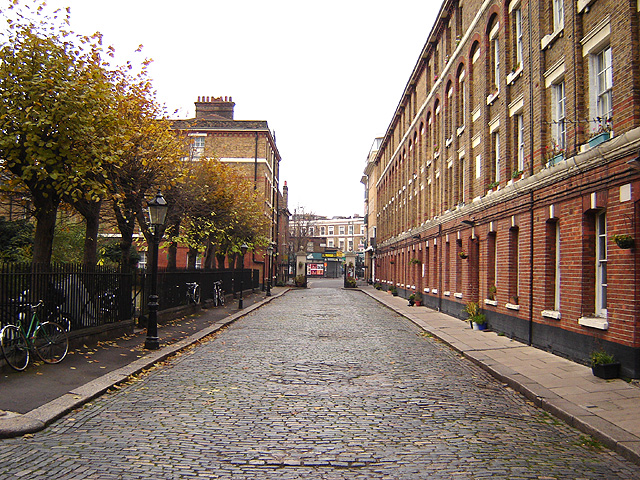
Gibson Gardens with original cobblestone paving (December 2005)

Gibson Gardens is a historic tenement block of flats in Stoke Newington in London, England.

The flats were built by the Metropolitan Association for Improving the Dwellings of the Industrious Classes in 1880 and named in honour of Thomas Field Gibson, who was a Director of the Association from its inception. It originally comprised three brick blocks of flats and a row of 'cottages' which originally housed older relations of people living in the blocks. A further block (the 'paddlesteamer' block) was built later. They were originally called Gibson Buildings and were some of the first quality dwellings for working and lower-middle-class families in London.

The buildings are located near the corner of Northwold Road and Stoke Newington High Street (A10), close to Stoke Newington Common.

They were renovated in 1975 but many period features survive, including the rare cobblestone street surfaces.

Gibson Gardens was a location for shooting the video of the 2007 single Back to Black by Amy Winehouse and the 2015 film Legend starring Tom Hardy. Scenes from the "Screen Two" presentation "Heading Home" (1990) starring Gary Oldman, Joely Richardson, Steven Dillane & Stella Gonet was also shot in the Gardens.

The alleged Russian spy Anna Chapman and her husband lived in Gibson Gardens for a period around 2002.

== Bibliography ==
- The Gibson Gardens History and Cookbook, Centerprise Trust, 1984 (ISBN 0-903738-65-1)
- Gaslight on the Cobble: Family life in Gibson Gardens and Stoke Newington 1923-1955 by Doris Robson, Paz Publications, 1998 (ISBN 0-9533954-0-5)
- The Alternative Guide to the London Boroughs, Open House, Edited by Owen Hatherley, 2020 (ISBN 978-1-9160169-1-0)

== Nearest station ==
Stoke Newington railway station
