= Henry Roberts (architect) =

British architect

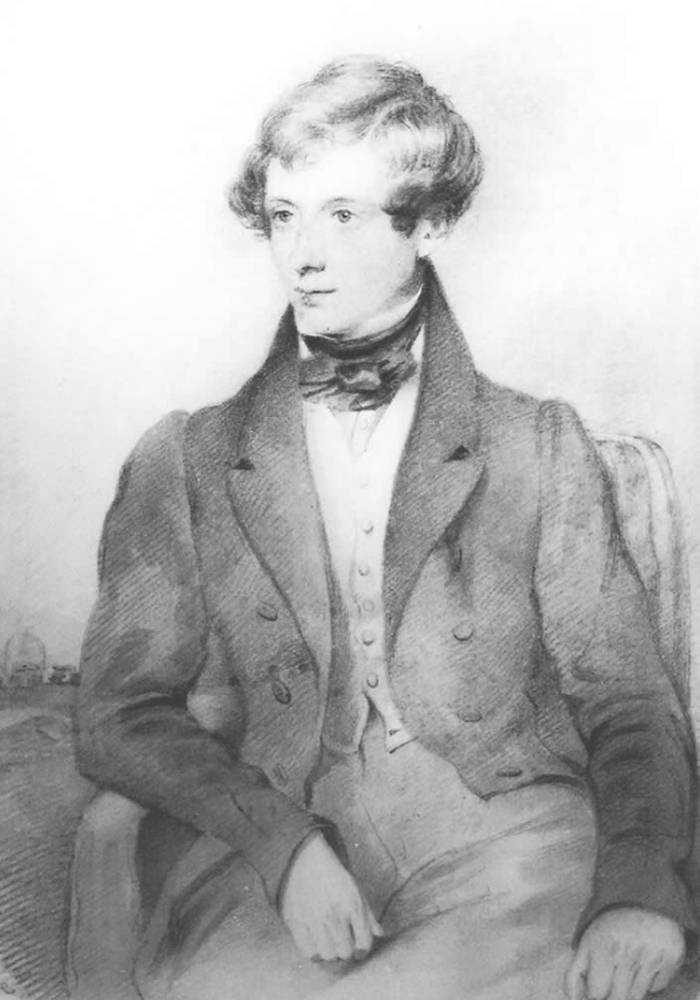
- Born: 16 April 1803; Philadelphia, Pennsylvania, US
- Died: 9 March 1876 (aged 72); Florence, Italy
- Occupation: Architect

Henry Roberts (16 April 1803 – 9 March 1876) was a British architect best known for Fishmongers' Hall in London and for his work on model dwellings for workers.

== Biography ==
Roberts was born on 16 April 1803, in Philadelphia. His family returned to England shortly thereafter.

In 1817, Roberts began an apprenticeship with Charles Fowler, where he stayed until 1825. He then entered the Royal Academy Schools and worked for Robert Smirke, took part in competitions, and traveled in Italy before returning to London to set up his architectural practice there in 1830.

In 1832, Roberts won the competition for the Fishmongers' Hall at London Bridge, which was to be his most well-known large-scale work. George Gilbert Scott was his pupil during this period. He also designed a number of country houses, including Escot House, Devon (1838) and Norton Manor, Norton Fitzwarren, Somerset (1843). He also designed the Camberwell Collegiate School (1843).

In 1844, Roberts was appointed architect to the joint companies building the Brighton, Croydon, Dover and Greenwich Railway, and was jointly responsible for designing the rebuilt London Bridge railway station. The same year, he became Honorary Architect to the Society for Improving the Condition of the Labouring Classes. For that Society, and later for the Metropolitan Association for Improving the Dwellings of the Industrious Classes, Roberts designed a number of buildings that represented innovations in workers' housing, including the houses in Lower Road, Pentonville, London (1844) and the famous model dwellings in Streatham Street, Bloomsbury (1849–1851). Another estate of model dwellings built by Roberts in 1852 survives today in Windsor, Berkshire, and the only other example of 2 storey Model dwellings that exists are to be found in Newcomen Road, Tunbridge Wells, Kent.

Roberts was very influential on subsequent efforts in the area of workers' housing throughout Europe and the United States, both through his built work and his writings.

Roberts spent his later life in Italy, and died in Florence, on 9 March 1876, aged 72.

== Publications ==
- The Dwellings of the Labouring Classes, 1850.
- Home Reform: or, What the Working Classes may do to Improve their Dwellings, 1856.
- The Improvement of the Dwellings of the Labouring Classes through the Operation of Government Measures, 1859.
- The Essentials of a Healthy Dwelling and the Extension of its Benefits to the Labouring Population, 1862.
- The Physical Condition of the Labouring Classes, Resulting from the State of their Dwellings, 1866.
- Efforts on the Continent for Improving the Dwellings of the Labouring Classes, 1874.

== Sources ==
- James Steven Curl, Henry Roberts, A Dictionary of Architecture and Landscape Architecture, Oxford University Press, 2000.
