= Agudas Israel Housing Association =

British housing association

Agudas Israel Housing Association (AIHA)
- Type: Not For Profit Housing Association
- Founded: 1982; 44 years ago
- Founder: London, UK
- Area served: United Kingdom
- Key people: Chaya Spitz OBE (CEO)
- Number of employees: 200
- Website: aiha.org.uk

Agudas Israel Housing Association (AIHA) is a BME Housing Association that provides over 900 low-cost homes for members of the Orthodox Jewish community in need across the UK. The non-profit includes low-cost housing for rent and shared ownership; retirement living; residential and nursing care; supported living for people with special needs; and a mother-and-baby home.

AIHA's flagship scheme is Schonfeld Square, a mixed development incorporating rented general needs properties, sheltered retirement housing and a care home. The organization has earned various accolades, including the RIBA Housing Project Design Award, British Homes Awards, Housing Project Design Award, and Happi Award, to name a few.

== History ==
Agudas Israel Housing Association started its journey in 1982 to address the housing problems of the Orthodox Jewish community in North Hackney. Its main objective during that time was to provide housing advice to Charedi families in acute need. The Orthodox Jewish community, which by 1991 had reached an estimated 18,000 people, has since grown to approximately 75,000 people.

AIHA registered with the Housing Corporation as a BME Housing Association in July 1986 with the purpose of providing housing for Orthodox Jews and is now registered with the Regulator of Social Housing as a Social Landlord. The organization has adopted the National Housing Federation Code of Governance in 2015. It is governed in accordance with the Nolan principles of Public Life and AIHA's own Code of Conduct and policies.

== Services ==
Agudas Israel Housing Association manages over 900 homes in North London, Salford, Canvey Island, Westcliff, and Gateshead in the Northeast of England. The non-profit also provides over 100 spaces of supported housing, ranging from birth to retirement living, and employs over 145 team members to deliver these services.

Services provided at the flagship Schonfeld Square include residential and nursing care, hospice care, and supported housing for independent retired people. Other important AIHA projects include providing accommodation and support for people with learning disabilities at Yad Vo’Ezer's in Queen Elizabeth Walk.

Notable AIHA developments include: the RIBA award-winning Schonfeld Square; the Beenstock Home in Salford; and the Beis Brucha Mother & Baby Home. All of the above-mentioned works have been rated "Good" by the Care Quality Commission.

== Legal challenge ==
Agudas Israel Housing Association faced a legal challenge in 2017 filed by a mother of four children who had attempted to access suitable housing in Hackney from AIHA. Hackney Council did not forward her application to AIHA on account of her not being a member of the Orthodox Jewish community. This led the woman to bring judicial proceedings challenging the arrangements between AIHA and Hackney Council on the basis of discrimination.

Her claim was dismissed by the High Court, which cited the difficulties faced by the Orthodox Jewish community in accessing suitable housing. The decision was upheld by the Court of Appeal and the Supreme Court before an application was lodged by the complainant with the European Court of Human Rights in April 2021, which unanimously determined that the arrangement between Hackney Borough and Agudas Israel was objectively and reasonably justified and concluded that the challenge to AIHA was manifestly ill-founded.

The judgment went in favor of the AIHA, which concluded their work, mission, and objectives as lawful, allowing them to continue developing and managing homes for the Orthodox Jewish community.

== Awards and recognition ==
Agudas Israel Housing Association has been honored with several recognitions, as mentioned below:

- 1992: AIHA won the RIBA Housing Project Design Award for the ‘Schoenfeld Square’ project
- 1996: AIHA's founder, Ita Symons, was awarded an MBE for housing Charedi families in need by Her Majesty The Queen at Buckingham Palace
- 2010: AIHA won the British Telegraph ‘British Homes Awards’ Affordable Housing Development for ‘The Gardens’ redevelopment which included 39 large new family homes
- 2013: AIHA and Hanover won both the ‘Housing Project Design Award’ and the ‘Happi Award’ for the Buccleuch House redevelopment scheme
- 2016: AIHA and Hanover won the Best Affordable Housing Development at the Sunday Times British Homes Awards for the Weissmandel Court Social Housing Scheme
- 2019: AIHA won the Employer of the Year (Silver 50-249 staff) award by the Investors in People
