= Trottiscliffe Meadows =

Nature Conservation Review site in Kent

Coordinates: 51.311°N 0.356°E

- Site of Special Scientific Interest
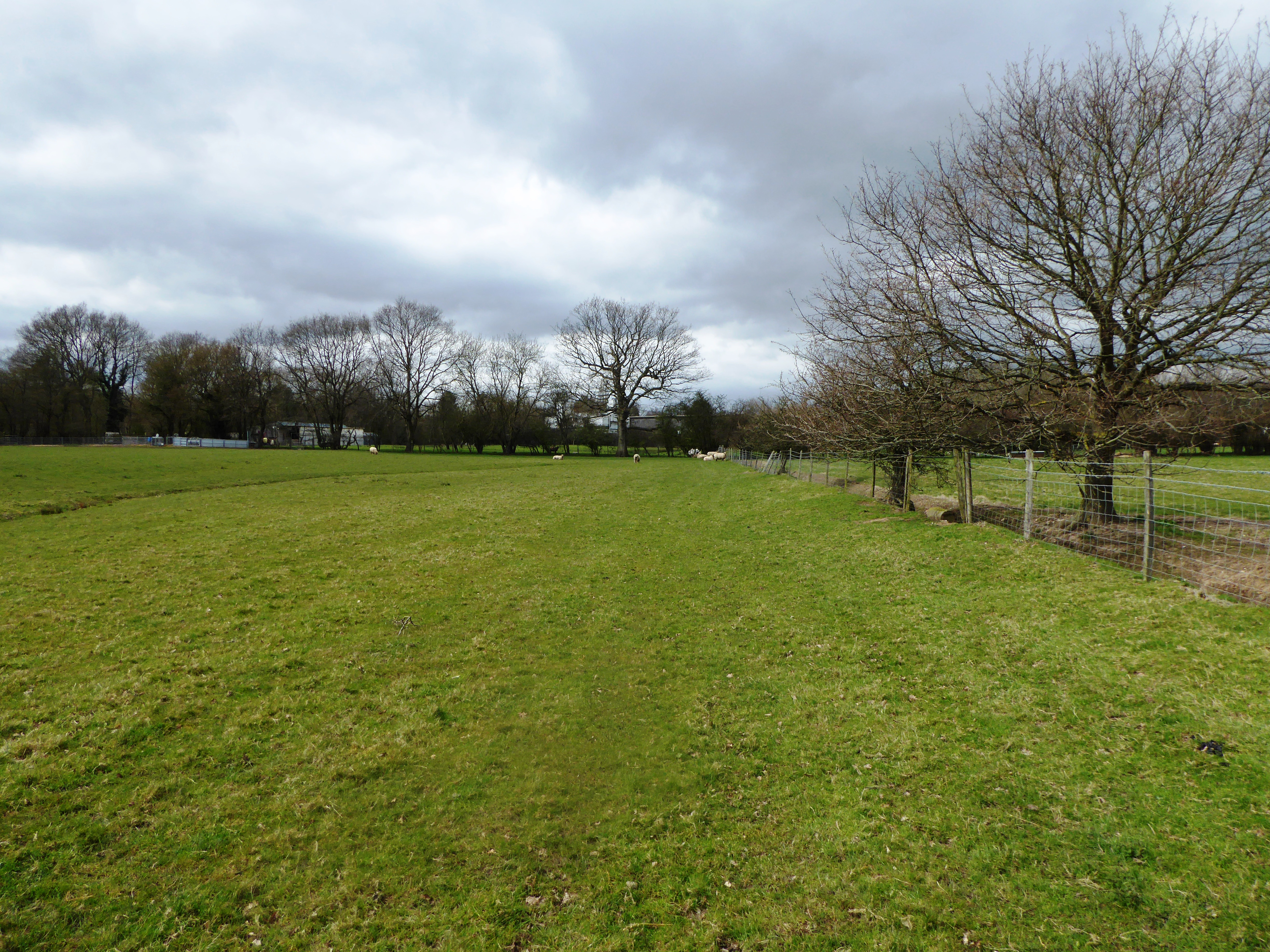
- Location of Trottiscliffe Meadows.
- Area of search: Kent
- Grid reference: TQ 643 595
- Interest: Biological
- Area: 4.8 hectares (12 acres)
- Notification date: 1990
- Location map: Magic Map

Trottiscliffe Meadows is a 4.8-hectare (12-acre) biological Site of Special Scientific Interest south of Trottiscliffe in Kent. It is a Nature Conservation Review site, Grade I.

These meadows on gault clay are crossed by calcareous streams, and they are two of the few remaining areas of unimproved grassland in the county. They have a number of uncommon plants, such as marsh valerian, carnation sedge, brown sedge and the rare moss cratoneuron filicinum.

The meadows are private land, but a public footpath crosses one of them.
