= Listed buildings in Trottiscliffe =

Civil Parish in Kent, England

Trottiscliffe is a village and civil parish in the Tonbridge and Malling district of Kent, England. It contains 24 listed buildings that are recorded in the National Heritage List for England. Of these one is grade I and 23 are grade II.

This list is based on the information retrieved online from Historic England.

== Key ==
Grade	Criteria
I	Buildings that are of exceptional interest
II*	Particularly important buildings of more than special interest
II	Buildings that are of special interest

== Listing ==
Name	Grade	Location	Type	Completed (Note: The date given is the date used by Historic England as significant for the initial building or that of an important part in the structure's description.)	Date designated	Grid ref. (Note: The grid reference is based on the British national grid reference system, sometimes known as OSGB36, used by the Ordnance Survey.) Geo-coordinates	Notes	Entry number (Note: The "List Entry Number" is a unique number assigned to each listed building and scheduled monument by Historic England.)	Image	Wikidata
Church of St Peter and St Paul	I	Church Road	church building		25 August 1959	TQ6463460544; 51°19′13″N 0°21′40″E		1236191	Church of St Peter and St Paul More images	Q17530266
Court Lodge	II	Church Road			1 August 1952	TQ6461160541; 51°19′13″N 0°21′39″E		1236196	Upload Photo	Q26529446
Front Boundary Wall to Court Lodge	II	Church Road			1 August 1952	TQ6461360520; 51°19′12″N 0°21′39″E		1236197	Upload Photo	Q26529447
George Inn Cottages	II	Ford Lane			1 August 1952	TQ6410359942; 51°18′54″N 0°21′12″E		1236210	Upload Photo	Q26529460
Great Reeds	II	Ford Lane			30 May 1984	TQ6410059916; 51°18′53″N 0°21′12″E		1236211	Upload Photo	Q26529461
The White House	II	Ford Lane			1 August 1952	TQ6412259925; 51°18′53″N 0°21′13″E		1264723	Upload Photo	Q26555396
Gore Cottage	II	Green Lane			30 May 1984	TQ6396060290; 51°19′05″N 0°21′05″E		1236214	Upload Photo	Q26529464
Long Gore	II	Green Lane			30 May 1984	TQ6396360307; 51°19′06″N 0°21′05″E		1236221	Upload Photo	Q26529471
Trottiscliffe House	II	Green Lane			30 May 1984	TQ6398460296; 51°19′05″N 0°21′06″E		1236212	Upload Photo	Q26529462
Commority	II	Pilgrims Way, ME19 5EW			30 May 1984	TQ6521961290; 51°19′36″N 0°22′12″E		1236223	Upload Photo	Q26529473
Dormers and the Post Office	II	Taylor's Lane			30 May 1984	TQ6406360110; 51°18′59″N 0°21′10″E		1264698	Upload Photo	Q26555372
Ivy Cottage	II	Taylor's Lane			30 May 1984	TQ6411260035; 51°18′57″N 0°21′13″E		1264669	Upload Photo	Q26555345
Rory	II	Taylor's Lane			30 May 1984	TQ6404860152; 51°19′01″N 0°21′09″E		1264668	Upload Photo	Q26555344
Rose Farmhouse	II	Taylor's Lane			30 May 1984	TQ6413659974; 51°18′55″N 0°21′14″E		1236261	Upload Photo	Q26529506
The Forge	II	Taylor's Lane			30 May 1984	TQ6412659993; 51°18′55″N 0°21′13″E		1236260	Upload Photo	Q26529505
The Oast House	II	Taylor's Lane			30 May 1984	TQ6408060116; 51°18′59″N 0°21′11″E		1236259	Upload Photo	Q26529504
The Plough Public House	II	Taylor's Lane			30 May 1984	TQ6405660123; 51°19′00″N 0°21′10″E		1236239	Upload Photo	Q26529489
The Red House	II	Taylor's Lane			30 May 1984	TQ6401160150; 51°19′01″N 0°21′08″E		1264701	Upload Photo	Q26555375
The Tanyard	II	Taylor's Lane			30 May 1984	TQ6396660010; 51°18′56″N 0°21′05″E		1236236	Upload Photo	Q26529486
The George Inn	II	Taylors Lane	pub		30 May 1984	TQ6410059972; 51°18′55″N 0°21′12″E		1264692	The George Inn More images	Q26555366
Barn 30 Yards North West of Millers Farmhouse	II	Wrotham Water Lane			30 May 1984	TQ6395260204; 51°19′02″N 0°21′05″E		1236276	Upload Photo	Q26529519
Miller's Farmhouse	II	Wrotham Water Lane, Miller's Farm			30 May 1984	TQ6397060188; 51°19′02″N 0°21′06″E		1264671	Upload Photo	Q26555347
Old Roundel Barn	II	Wrotham Water Lane, ME19 5DY			30 May 1984	TQ6396360173; 51°19′01″N 0°21′05″E		1236278	Upload Photo	Q26529521

== See also ==
- Grade I listed buildings in Kent
- Grade II* listed buildings in Kent

== Sources ==
- Newman, John (2012) [1969], Kent: West and the Weald, The Buildings of England, New Haven and London: Yale University Press, ISBN 978-0-300-18509-6
