= Coldrum Long Barrow =

Neolithic chambered long barrow in Kent, England

Coldrum Long Barrow (Coldrum Stones)
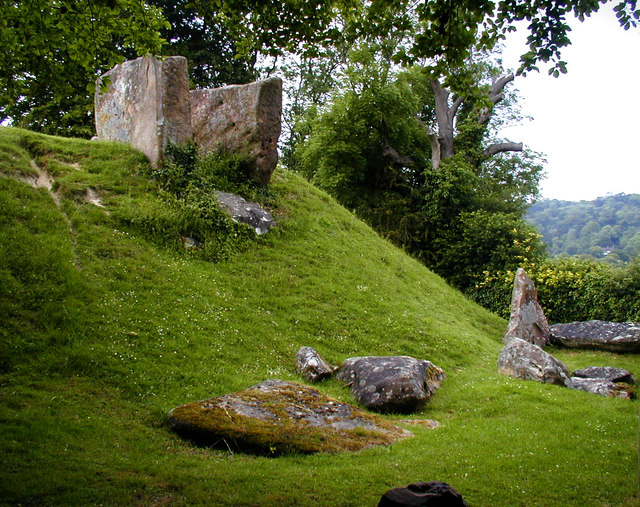
- The eastern side of the monument, showing the surviving stone burial chamber at the top of the slope and fallen sarsens at the bottom

- Location within Kent
- Established: Early Neolithic
- Location: Trottiscliffe, Kent
- Coordinates: 51.3216°N 0.3728°E
- Type: Long barrow

The Coldrum Long Barrow, also known as the Coldrum Stones and the Adscombe Stones, is a chambered long barrow located near the village of Trottiscliffe in the south-eastern English county of Kent. Probably constructed in the fourth millennium BCE, during Britain's Early Neolithic period, today it survives only in a state of ruin.

Archaeologists have established that the monument was built by pastoralist communities shortly after the introduction of agriculture to Britain from continental Europe. Part of an architectural tradition of long barrow building that was widespread across Neolithic Europe, the Coldrum Stones belong to a localised regional variant of barrows produced in the vicinity of the River Medway, now known as the Medway Megaliths. Of these, it is in the best surviving condition. It lies near to both Addington Long Barrow and Chestnuts Long Barrow on the western side of the river. Two further surviving long barrows, Kit's Coty House and Little Kit's Coty House, as well as possible survivals such as the Coffin Stone and White Horse Stone, are located on the Medway's eastern side.

Built out of earth and around fifty local sarsen-stone megaliths, the long barrow consisted of a sub-rectangular earthen tumulus enclosed by kerb-stones. Within the eastern end of the tumulus was a stone chamber, into which human remains were deposited on at least two separate occasions during the Early Neolithic. Osteoarchaeological analysis of these remains has shown them to be those of at least seventeen individuals, a mixture of men, women, and children. At least one of the bodies had been dismembered before burial, potentially reflecting a funerary tradition of excarnation and secondary burial. As with other barrows, Coldrum has been interpreted as a tomb to house the remains of the dead, perhaps as part of a belief system involving ancestor veneration, although archaeologists have suggested that it may also have had further religious, ritual, and cultural connotations and uses.

After the Early Neolithic, the long barrow fell into a state of ruined dilapidation, perhaps experiencing deliberate destruction in the Late Medieval period, either by Christian iconoclasts or treasure hunters. In local folklore, the site became associated with the burial of a prince and the countless stones motif. The ruin attracted the interest of antiquarians in the 19th century, while archaeological excavation took place in the early 20th. In 1926, ownership was transferred to heritage charity the National Trust. Open without charge to visitors all year around, the stones are the site of a rag tree, a May Day morris dance, and various modern Pagan rituals.

== Name and location ==
The Coldrum Stones are named after a nearby farm, Coldrum Lodge, which has since been demolished. The monument lies in a "rather isolated site" north-east of the nearby village of Trottiscliffe, in the south-eastern English county of Kent. The site is also positioned about 500 metres (550 yards) from a prehistoric track known as the Pilgrims' Way. The tomb can be reached along a pathway known as Coldrum Lane, which is accessible only on foot. The nearest car park to Coldrum Lane can be found off Pinesfield Lane in Trottiscliffe. The village of Addington is located 2.012 kilometres (1 mile 440 yd) away.

== Context ==
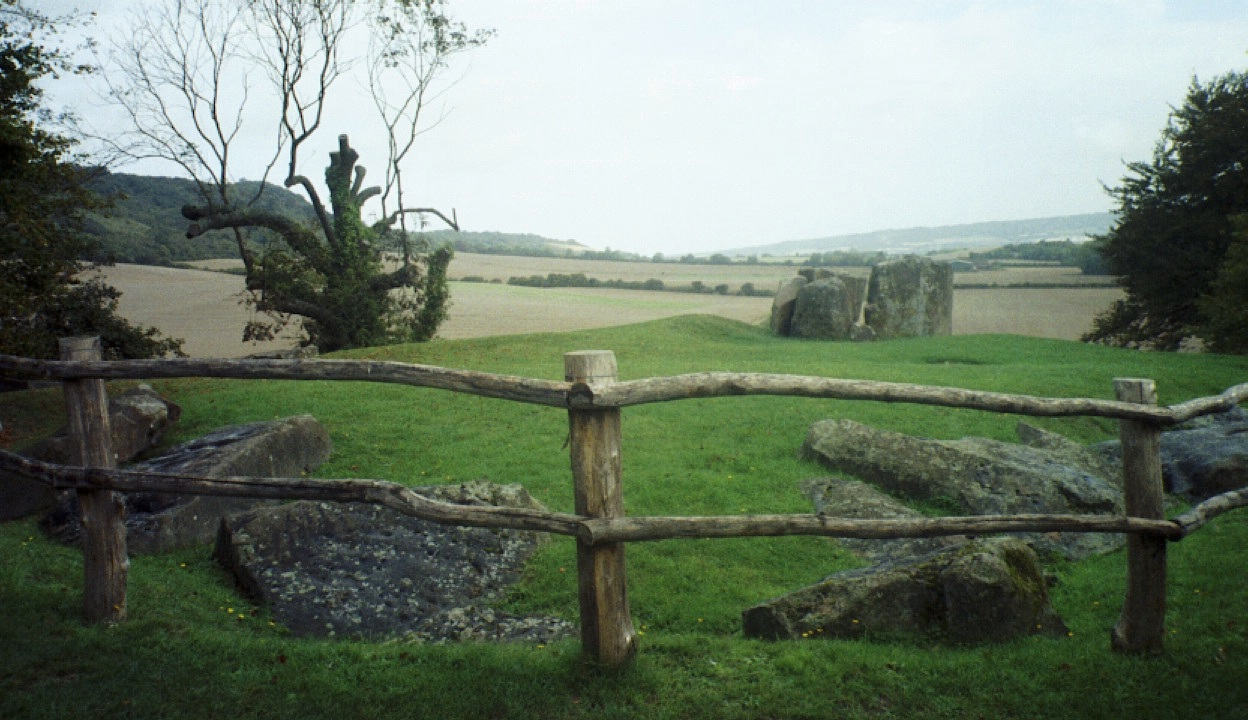
View of the monument from the west of it; the peristalith is in the foreground and the chamber to the rear

The Early Neolithic was a revolutionary period of British history. Between 4500 and 3800 BCE, it saw a widespread change in lifestyle as the communities living in the British Isles adopted agriculture as their primary form of subsistence, abandoning the hunter-gatherer lifestyle that had characterised the preceding Mesolithic period. This came about through contact with continental European societies; it is unclear to what extent this can be attributed to an influx of migrants or to indigenous Mesolithic Britons adopting agricultural technologies from the continent. The region of modern Kent would have been key for the arrival of continental European settlers and visitors, because of its position on the estuary of the River Thames and its proximity to the continent.

Britain was then largely forested; widespread forest clearance did not occur in Kent until the Late Bronze Age (c.1000 to 700 BCE). Environmental data from the vicinity of the White Horse Stone, a putatively prehistoric monolith near the River Medway, supports the idea that the area was still largely forested in the Early Neolithic, covered by a woodland of oak, ash, hazel/alder and amygdaloideae. Throughout most of Britain, there is little evidence of cereal or permanent dwellings from this period, leading archaeologists to believe that the island's Early Neolithic economy was largely pastoral, relying on herding cattle, with people living a nomadic or semi-nomadic life.

=== Medway Megaliths ===
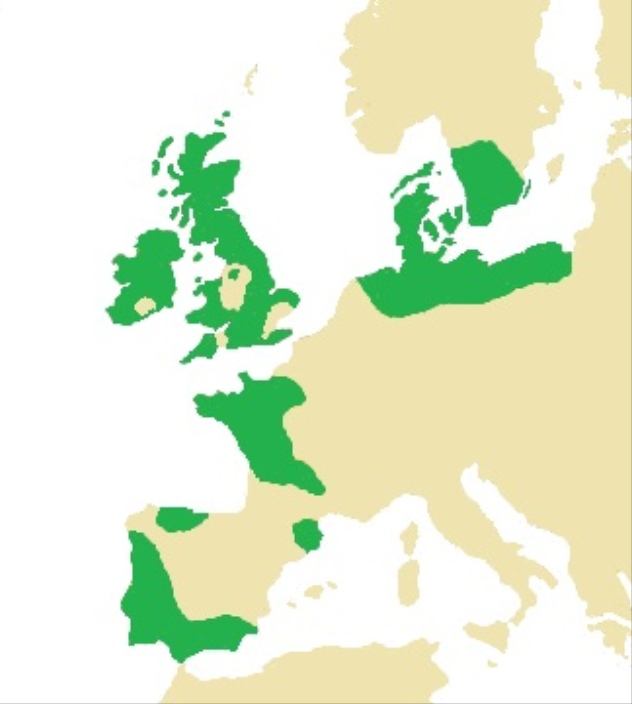
The construction of long barrows and related funerary monuments took place in various parts of Europe during the Early Neolithic (known distribution pictured)

Across Western Europe, the Early Neolithic marked the first period in which humans built monumental structures in the landscape. These structures included chambered long barrows, rectangular or oval earthen tumuli which had a chamber built into one end. Some of these chambers were constructed out of timber, while others were built using large stones, now known as "megaliths". These long barrows often served as tombs, housing the physical remains of the dead within their chamber. Individuals were rarely buried alone in the Early Neolithic, instead being interred in collective burials with other members of their community. These chambered tombs were built all along the Western European seaboard during the Early Neolithic, from southeastern Spain up to southern Sweden, taking in most of the British Isles; the architectural tradition was introduced to Britain from continental Europe in the first half of the fourth millennium BCE. Although there are stone buildings—like Göbekli Tepe in modern Turkey—which predate them, the chambered long barrows constitute humanity's first widespread tradition of construction using stone.

Although now all in a ruinous state and not retaining their original appearance, at the time of construction the Medway Megaliths would have been some of the largest and most visually imposing Early Neolithic funerary monuments in Britain. Grouped along the River Medway as it cuts through the North Downs, they constitute the most southeasterly group of megalithic monuments in the British Isles, and the only megalithic group in eastern England. The archaeologists Brian Philp and Mike Dutto deemed the Medway Megaliths to be "some of the most interesting and well known" archaeological sites in Kent, while the archaeologist Paul Ashbee described them as "the most grandiose and impressive structures of their kind in southern England".

The Medway Megaliths can be divided into two separate clusters: one to the west of the River Medway and the other on Blue Bell Hill to the east, with the distance between the two clusters measuring at between 8 kilometres (5.0 mi) and 10 kilometres (6.2 mi). The western group includes Coldrum Long Barrow, Addington Long Barrow, and the Chestnuts Long Barrow. The eastern group consists of Smythe's Megalith, Kit's Coty House, and Little Kit's Coty House, while various stones on the eastern side of the river, most notably the Coffin Stone and White Horse Stone, may also have been parts of such structures. It is not known if they were all built at the same time, or whether they were constructed in succession, while similarly it is not known if they each served the same function or whether there was a hierarchy in their usage.

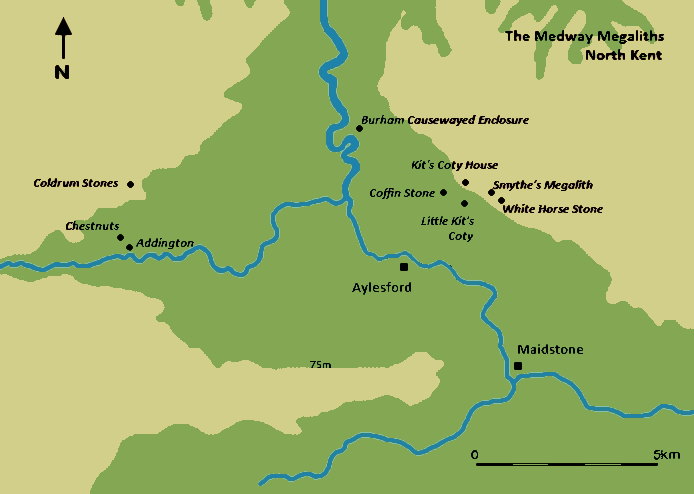
Map of the Medway Megaliths around the River Medway

The Medway long barrows all conformed to the same general design plan, and are all aligned on an east to west axis. Each had a stone chamber at the eastern end of the mound, and they each probably had a stone facade flanking the entrance. They had internal heights of up to 3.0 metres (10 feet), making them taller than most other chambered long barrows in Britain. The chambers were constructed from sarsen, a dense, hard, and durable stone that occurs naturally throughout Kent, having formed out of sand from the Eocene epoch. Early Neolithic builders would have selected blocks from the local area, and then transported them to the site of the monument to be erected.

These common architectural features among the Medway Megaliths indicate a strong regional cohesion with no direct parallels elsewhere in the British Isles. Nevertheless, as with other regional groupings of Early Neolithic long barrows—such as the Cotswold-Severn group in south-western Britain—there are also various idiosyncrasies in the different monuments, such as Coldrum's rectilinear shape, the Chestnut Long Barrow's facade, and the long, thin mounds at Addington and Kit's Coty. These variations might have been caused by the tombs being altered and adapted over the course of their use; in this scenario, the monuments would be composite structures.

The people who built these monuments were probably influenced by pre-existing tomb-shrines that they were already aware of. Whether those people had grown up locally, or moved into the Medway area from elsewhere is not known. Based on a stylistic analysis of their architectural designs, the archaeologist Stuart Piggott thought that the plan behind the Medway Megaliths had originated in the area around the Low Countries, while fellow archaeologist Glyn Daniel instead believed that the same evidence showed an influence from Scandinavia. John H. Evans instead suggested an origin in Germany, and Ronald F. Jessup thought that their origins could be seen in the Cotswold-Severn megalithic group. Ashbee noted that their close clustering in the same area was reminiscent of the megalithic tomb-shrine traditions of continental Northern Europe, and emphasised that the Medway Megaliths were a regional manifestation of a tradition widespread across Early Neolithic Europe. He nevertheless stressed that a precise place of origin was "impossible to indicate" with the available evidence.

== Design and construction ==
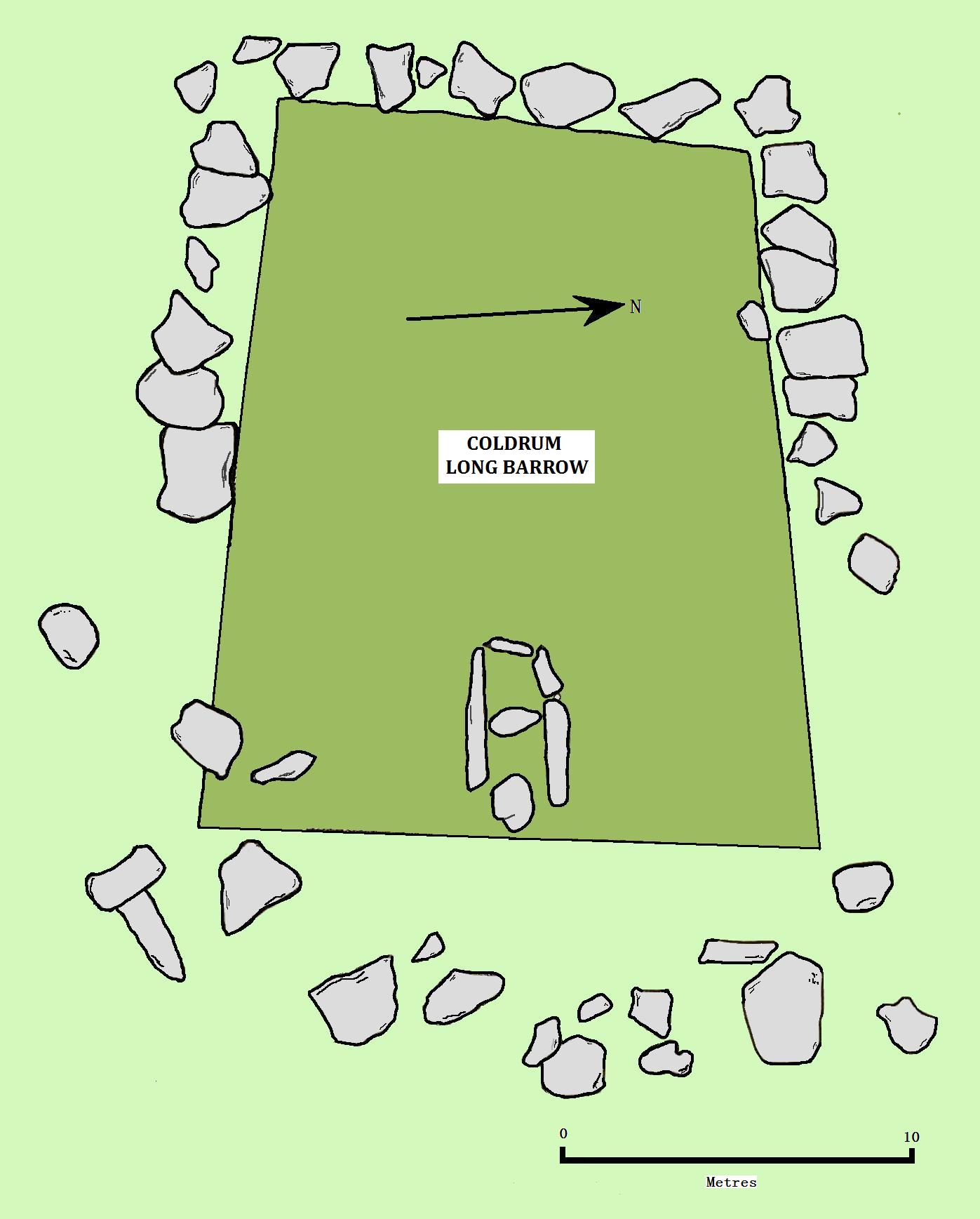
Plan of the monument; the darker green area represents the area of the earthen mound.

The Coldrum Long Barrow originally consisted of a sarsen stone chamber, covered by a low earthen mound, which was bounded by prostrate slabs. As such, Ashbee asserted that the monument could be divided into three particular features: the chamber, the barrow, and the sarsen stone surround. It had been built using about 50 stones. The barrow is sub-rectangular in plan, and about 20 metres (66 ft) in length. At its broader, eastern end, where the chamber is located, the monument measures 15 metres (50 ft), while at the narrower, western end, it is 12 metres (40 ft) in breadth. As such, the barrow is a "truncated wedge-shape".

The megalithic builders responsible for the Coldrum Stones positioned it on the top of a small ridge adjacent to the North Downs, and constructed it facing eastward, towards the River Medway. It is located on the edge of a large lynchet scarp, although it is difficult to ascertain what views would have been possible from the monument at the time of construction, due to a lack of information on how densely forested the vicinity was. If the area was not highly wooded, then 360° views of the surrounding landscape would have been possible. The monument's axis points toward both the North Downs and the Medway Valley, which is similar to the other Medway Megaliths. The archaeologist Sian Killick suggested that the Coldrum Long Barrow might have been built within view of a nearby settlement, and that this "may have been a key factor in the experience of ceremonies and rituals taking place at the tombs and may also have defined a link between the tomb builders and the landscape."

Coldrum Long Barrow is comparatively isolated from the other Medway Megaliths; in this it is unique, given that the other surviving examples are clustered into two groups. It is possible that another chambered tomb was located nearby; a razed, elongated earthen mound with an east–west orientation is located in a hollow at the foot of the downs just under a quarter of a mile north of the Coldrum Stones. It may be that this represents the remnants of another such monument which has had its stones removed or buried. Several large sarsens south of the Coldrums might represent the remnants of a further such tomb, since destroyed.

=== The chamber ===
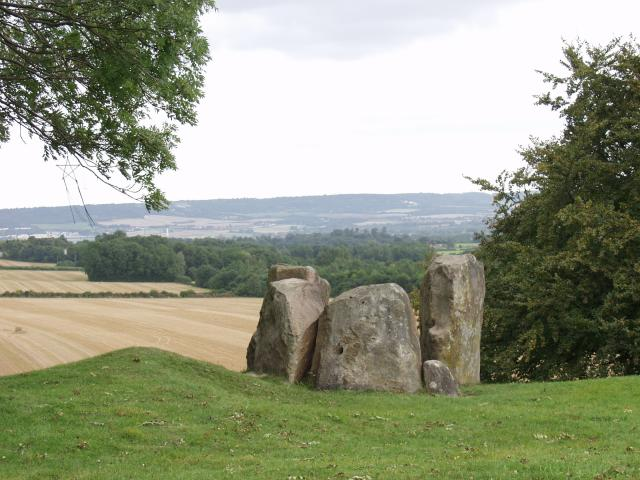
The chamber of the Coldrum Stones, as seen from their western side

The inner chamber measures 4.0 metres (13 ft) in length, and 1.68 metres (5 ft 6 in) in width, although it was potentially much larger when originally constructed. The chamber's internal height would have been at least 1.98 metres (6 ft 6 in). In its current state, the northern side of the chamber is made up of two slabs. One is 2.4 metres (8 ft) long, 2.29 metres (7 ft 6 in) deep, and 0.53 metres (1 ft 9 in) thick; the other is 1.5 metres (5 ft) long, nearly 1.8 metres (6 ft) deep, and 0.61 metres (2 ft) thick. Conversely, the chamber's southern side consists of a single slab, measuring 3.45 metres (11 ft 4 in) in length, 2.21 metres (7 ft 3 in) in depth, and 0.53 metres (1 ft 9 in) in thickness at its eastern end.

The western end of the chamber is closed off with a slab measuring about 1.37 metres (4 ft 6 in) wide, with a thickness of 0.30 metres (1 ft) and a depth of around 2.4 metres (8 ft). A collapsed, broken slab lies at the chamber's opening, eastern end. It is also possible that a largely rectangular slab at the bottom of the slope had once been part of the chamber's eastern end. Excavation has revealed that flint masonry was used to pack around the chamber and support its sarsens; 20th-century renovation has seen this largely replaced with cement, allowing the stones to continue standing upright.

It is possible that there was a facade in front of the chamber, as is evident at other chambered tombs in Britain, such as West Kennet Long Barrow and Wayland's Smithy. It is also possible that there was a portal stone atop the chamber, as was apparent at Kit's Coty House and Lower Kit's Coty House. Many of the larger slabs of stone that have fallen down the slope on the eastern end of the monument may have been parts of this facade or portal.

=== The mound and kerb-stones ===
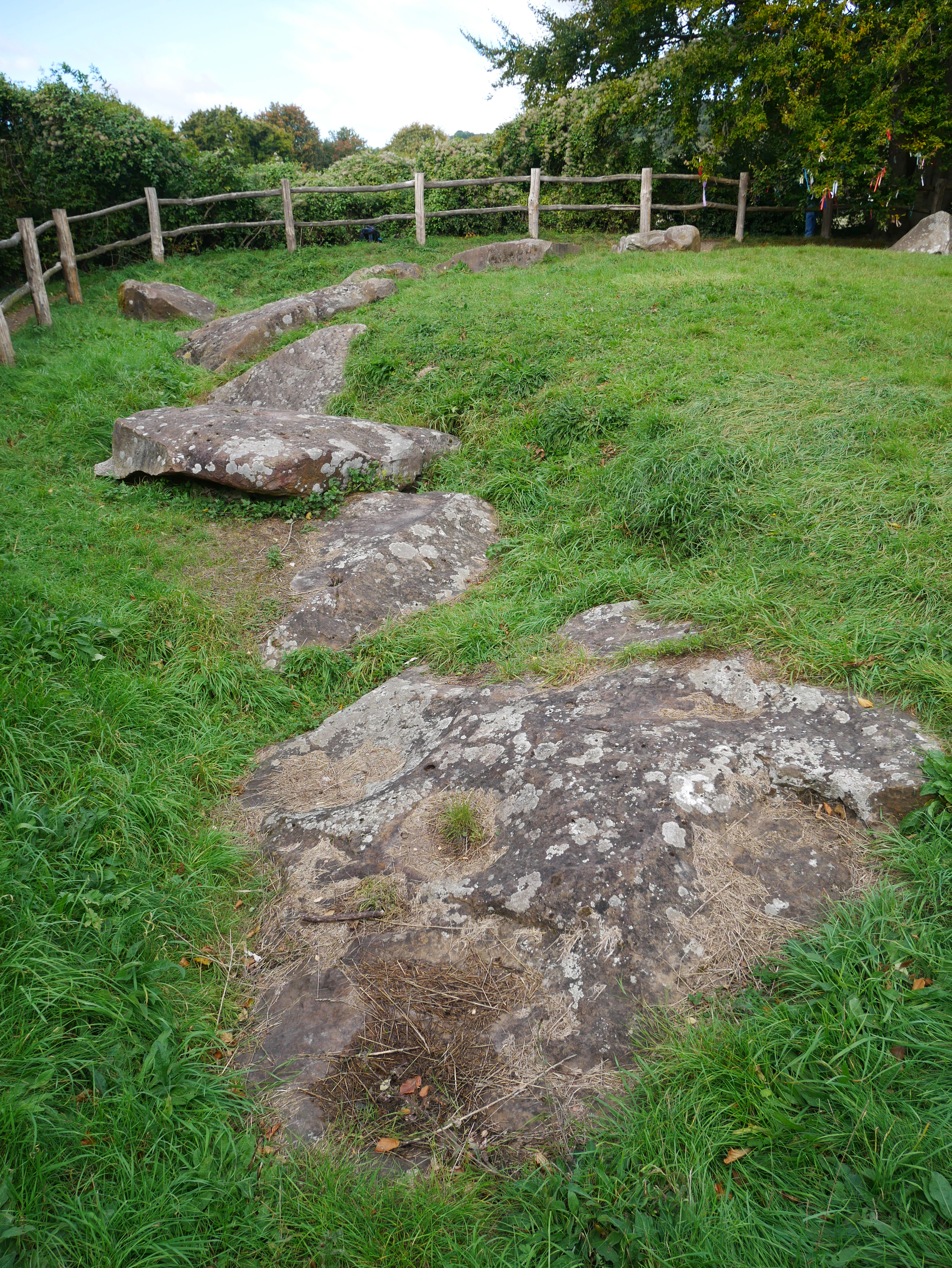
The western edge of the monument

The earthen mound that once covered the tomb is now visible only as an undulation approximately 0.46 metres (1 ft 6 in) in height. In the 19th century, the mound was higher on the western end of the tomb, although during the 1920s this was removed by excavation to reveal the sarsens beneath. It is probable that in the Early Neolithic, the mound had a quarry ditch surrounding it, and it is inside this ditch that the kerb-stones now sit.

The kerb-stones around the tomb display some patterning; those on the northern side are mostly rectilinear, while those on the southern side are smaller and largely irregular in shape. It is probable that there was an ancillary dry-stone wall constructed using blocks of ironstone from the geological Folkestone beds, as is evident at Chestnuts Long Barrow. Given that such blocks of stone rarely occur naturally, it may have been quarried.

A concave line of abrasion and polishing can be found both on one of the central kerb-stones on the western end of the monument and on a kerb-stone on the south-east of the monument. These have been attributed to the sharpening of flint and other stone axe-blades on these sarsens. It is possible that these tools were sharpened for use in cutting and carving the timber levers and struts which would have been used in erecting the stones and constructing the tomb. Similar evidence for the sharpening of tools has been found at West Kennet Long Barrow, as well as later prehistoric monuments such as Stonehenge.

=== Meaning and purpose ===
Britain's Early Neolithic communities placed greater emphasis on the ritual burial of the dead than their Mesolithic forebears. Archaeologists have suggested that this is because Early Neolithic Britons adhered to an ancestor cult that venerated the spirits of the dead, believing that they could intercede with the forces of nature for the benefit of their living descendants. The archaeologist Robin Holgate stressed that rather than simply being tombs, the Medway Megaliths were "communal monuments fulfilling a social function for the communities who built and used them". Thus, it has been suggested that Early Neolithic people entered into the tombs—which doubled as temples or shrines—to perform rituals honouring the dead and requesting their assistance. For this reason, the historian Ronald Hutton termed these monuments "tomb-shrines" to reflect their dual purpose.

In Britain, these tombs were typically located on prominent hills and slopes overlooking the landscape, perhaps at the junction between different territories. The archaeologist Caroline Malone noted that the tombs would have served as one of various landscape markers that conveyed information on "territory, political allegiance, ownership, and ancestors". Many archaeologists have subscribed to the idea that these tomb-shrines were territorial markers between different tribes; others have argued that such markers would be of little use to a nomadic herding society. Instead it has been suggested that they represent markers along herding pathways. The archaeologist Richard Bradley suggested that the construction of these monuments reflects an attempt to mark control and ownership over the land, thus reflecting a change in mindset brought about by the transition from the hunter-gatherer Mesolithic to the pastoralist Early Neolithic. Others have suggested that these monuments were built on sites already deemed sacred by Mesolithic hunter-gatherers.

== Human remains ==
Within the chamber were placed human remains, which have been discovered and removed at intervals during the nineteenth and early twentieth centuries. Early twentieth century excavation found two separate deposits of bone, each buried atop a stone slab, one higher than the other. Also buried within the chamber were flint tools and small quantities of pottery.

=== Demographics ===
Ashbee suggested that—taking into account both its size and comparisons with other long barrows, such as Fussell's Lodge—the Coldrum tomb could have housed the remains of over a hundred individuals. Excavations conducted in the early 20th century have led to the methodical discovery and removal of what was believed to be the remains of twenty-two humans. These remains were examined by Sir Arthur Keith, the conservator of the museum at the Royal College of Surgeons. He published his results in 1913, in a paper largely concerned with discerning racial characteristics of the bodies. He ended his paper with the conclusion that "the people of pre-Christian Kent were physically not very different from the Kentish man of the Christian period".

In the early 21st century, these bones were re-analysed by a team led by the forensic taphonomist Michael Wysocki, the results of which were published in 2013. Wysocki's team conducted "osteological analysis, Bayesian modelling of radiocarbon dates, and carbon and nitrogen stable isotope analysis" in order to discover more about the "demography, burial practices, diet and subsistence, and chronology of the Coldrum population". Disputing earlier conclusions, their report stated that the minimum number of individuals was seventeen. These were identified as probably belonging to nine adults (probably five males and four females), two sub-adults (probably 16 to 20 years old), four older children, and two younger children (one around five years old, the other between 24 and 30 months old).

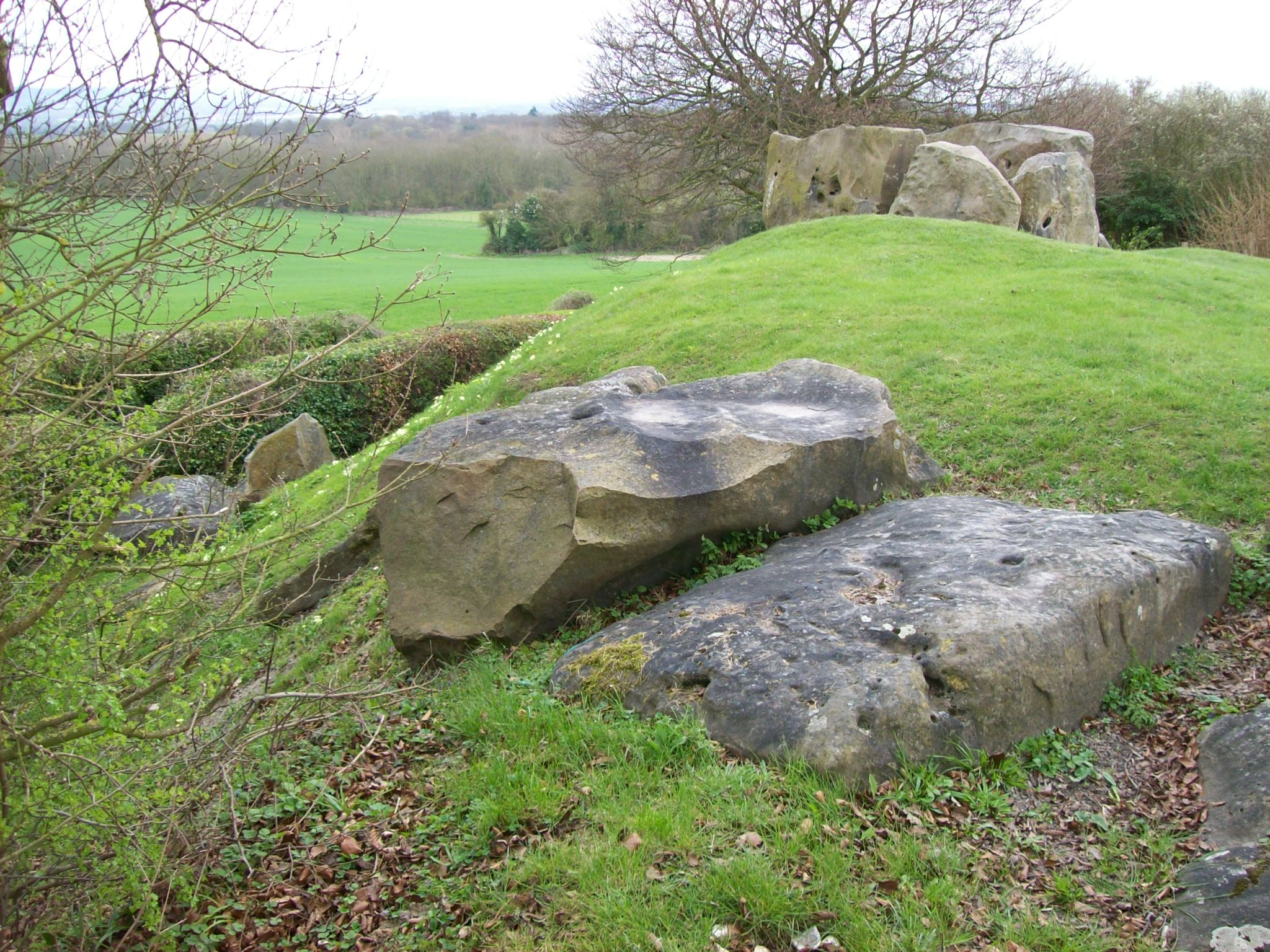
The northern kerb stones in the foreground, with the chamber in the background.

Keith believed that the crania he examined displayed similar features to one another, suggesting that this meant that they all belonged to "one family—or several families united by common descent." Similar observations have been made regarding the crania from other long barrows in Britain. The osteoarchaeologists Martin Smith and Megan Brickley cautioned that this did not necessarily mean that all of the individuals in any given barrow were members of a single family group, for such shared cranial traits would also be consistent with "a population that was still relatively small and scattered", in which most people were interrelated.

Wysocki's team noted that in all but one case, the fracture morphologies of the bones are consistent with dry-bone breakage. Three of the skulls displayed evidence that they had experienced violence; a probable adult female had an unhealed injury on the left frontal bone, an adult of indeterminate sex had an unhealed fracture on the left frontal, and a second adult female had a healed depressed fracture on the right frontal.

Isotope analysis of the remains revealed that while the bones had δ^{13}C values that were typical of those found at many other southern British Neolithic sites, they had significantly higher values of δ^{15}N, which grew over time. Although this data is difficult to interpret, the investigative team believed that it probably reflected that these individuals had had a terrestrial diet high in animal protein that over time was increasingly supplemented with freshwater river or estuarine foods. In the case of the older individuals whose remains were interred in the tomb, the tooth enamel was worn away and the dentine had become exposed on the chewing area of the crowns.

Radiocarbon dating of the human remains suggested that some were brought to the site between either 3980–3800 calibrated BCE (95% probability) or 3960–3880 cal BCE (68% probability). It further suggested that after an interval of either 60–350 years (95% probability) or 140–290 years (68% probability), additional depositions of human remains were made inside the tomb. This second phase probably began in 3730–3540 cal BCE (95% probability) or 3670–3560 cal BCE (68% probability). The radiocarbon dating of the human remains does not necessarily provide a date for the construction of Coldrum Long Barrow itself, because it is possible that the individuals died some time either before or after the monument's construction.

=== Post-mortem deposition ===
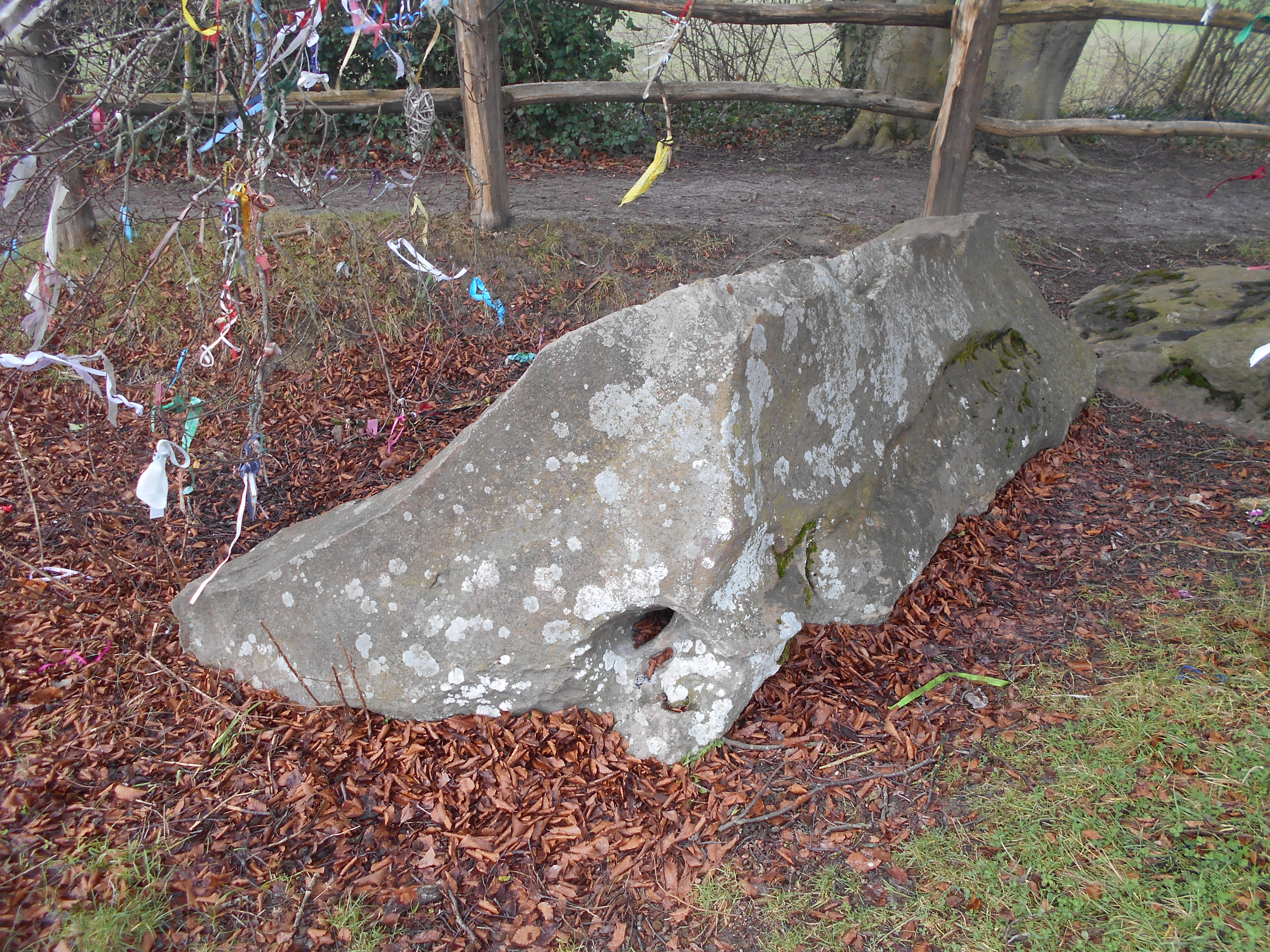
One of the kerb stones on the northern side of the monument

Cut-marks were identified on some of the bones (two femora, two innominates, and one cranium), with osteoarchaeological specialists suggesting that these had been created post-mortem as the bodies were dismembered and the bones removed from their attached ligaments. They further suggested that the absence of cut-marks on certain bones suggested that the body had already undergone partial decomposition or the removal of soft tissues prior to dismemberment. The precision of the cut-marks suggests that this dismemberment was done carefully; "they do not suggest frenzied hacking or mutilation." None of the criteria that osteoarchaeologists deem diagnostic of cannibalism were found on the bones.

This cut-marked human bone assemblage represented the largest yet identified from within a Neolithic long barrow in southern Britain, although similar evidence for dismemberment has been found from other Neolithic British sites, such as West Trump, Eyford, Aldestrop, and Haddenham. There are two possibilities for how this material developed. The first is that the bodies of the dead were excarnated or exposed to the elements, followed by a secondary burial within the tomb. The second is that they were placed in the tomb, where the flesh decomposed, before the bodies were then rearranged within the tomb itself. These practices may have been accompanied by other ritualistic or ceremonial practices, direct evidence for which does not survive.

The inclusion of occupational debris like ceramic sherds over the bones was not unique to the site but common in chambered tombs from southern England. On the basis of an example discovered at Kit's Coty House, Ashbee thought it apparent that the contents of the Coldrum's chamber would have been compartmentalised by medial slabs, which served the same purpose as the side chambers of West Kennet and Wayland's Smithy.

== Damage and dilapidation ==
All the surviving megalithic tombs from the Early Neolithic period have suffered from neglect and the ravages of agriculture. Ashbee noted that the Coldrum Stones represent "Kent's least damaged megalithic long barrow", however it too has suffered considerable damage, having become dilapidated and fallen apart over the six millennia since its original construction. Most prominently, the eastern side has largely collapsed, with the stones that once helped to hold up the side of the barrow having fallen to the bottom of the slope. Conversely, it is possible that the sarsens at the bottom of the slope were not part of the original monument, but were stones found in nearby fields which were deposited there by farmers.

Excavation of Chestnuts Long Barrow revealed that it had been systematically destroyed in one event, and Ashbee suggested that the same may have happened to the Coldrum Stones. He believed that the kerb-stones around the barrow were toppled, laid prostrate in the surrounding ditch, and then buried during the late 13th or early 14th century, by Christians seeking to obliterate non-Christian monuments. Conversely, the archaeologist John Alexander—who excavated Chestnuts in 1957—suggested that the Medway tombs were destroyed by robbers looking for treasure within them. As evidence, he pointed to the Close Roll of 1237, which ordered the opening of tumuli on the Isle of Wight in search for treasure, a practice which may have spread to Kent around the same time. Alexander believed that the destruction in Kent may have been brought about by a special commissioner, highlighting that the "expertness and thoroughness of the robbery" at Chestnuts would have necessitated resources beyond that which a local community could probably muster. Ashbee further suggested that in subsequent centuries, locals raided the damaged Coldrum tomb for loamy chalk and stone, which was then re-used as building material.

== Folklore, folk tradition, and modern Paganism ==
In a 1946 paper, the folklorist John H. Evans recorded the existence of a local folk belief that a battle was fought at the site of the Coldrum Stones, and that a "Black Prince" was buried within its chamber. He suggested that the tales of battles taking place at this site and at other Medway Megaliths had not developed independently among the local population but had "percolated down from the theories of antiquaries" who believed that the fifth-century Battle of Aylesford, which was recorded in the ninth-century Anglo-Saxon Chronicle, took place in the area.

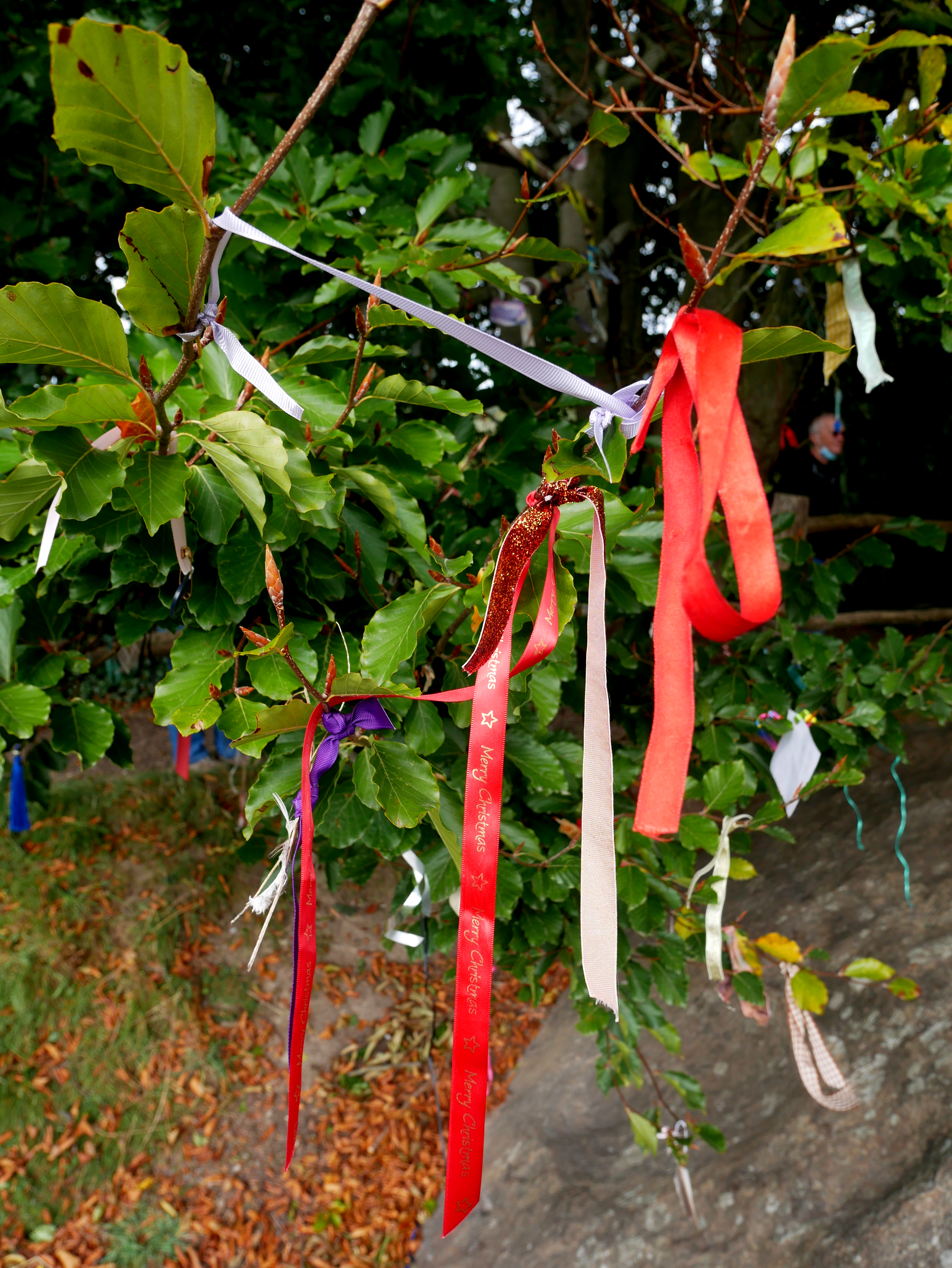
The rag tree overhanging the monument

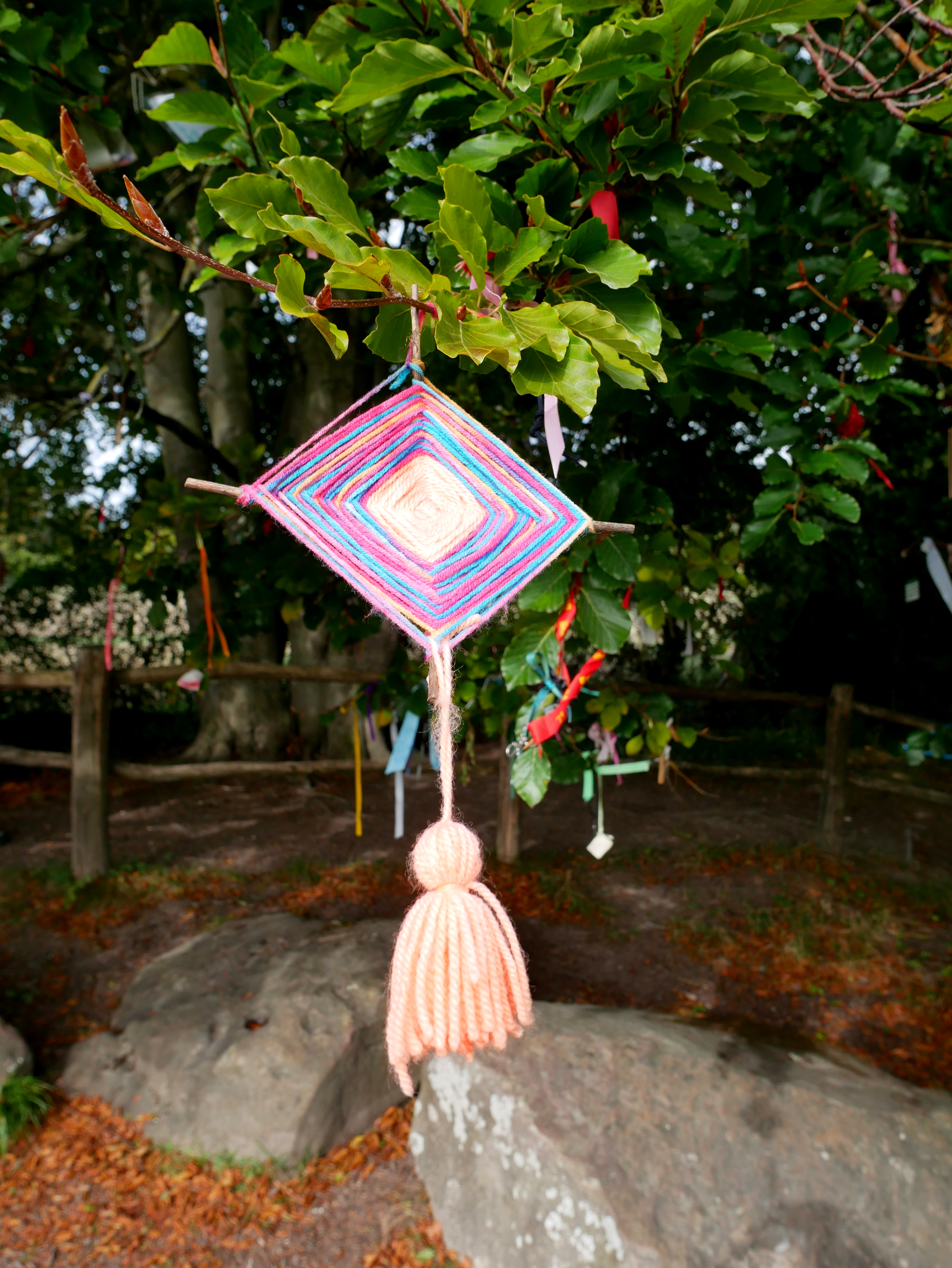
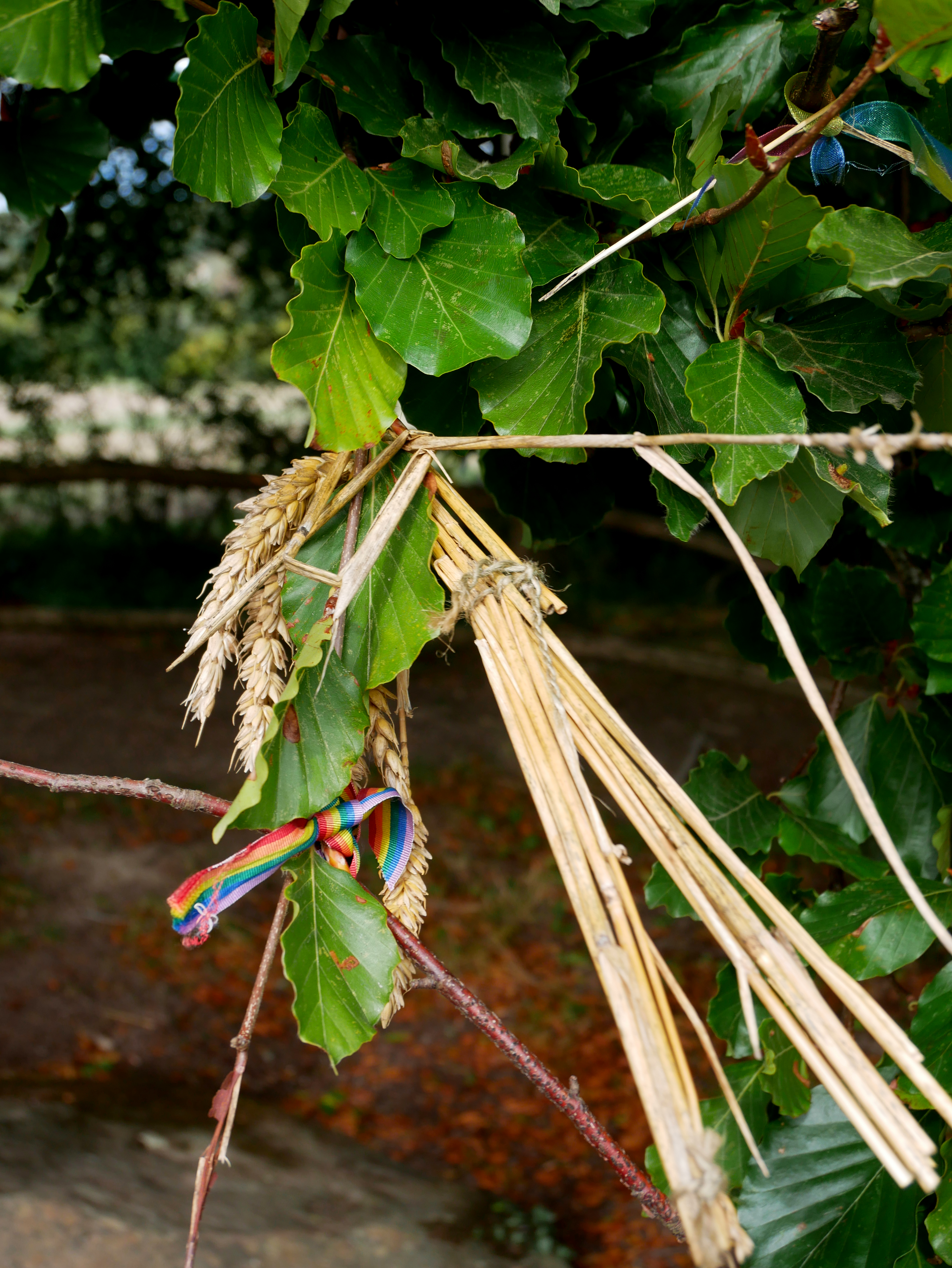

Evans also recorded a local folk belief applied to all the Medway Megaliths and which had been widespread "up to the last generation"; this was that it was impossible for anyone to successfully count the number of stones in the monuments. This "countless stones" motif is not unique to the Medway region, and can be found at various other megalithic monuments in Britain. The earliest textual evidence for it is found in an early 16th-century document, where it applies to the stone circle of Stonehenge in Wiltshire, although in an early 17th-century document it was applied to The Hurlers, a set of three stone circles in Cornwall. Later records reveal that it had gained widespread distribution in England, as well as a single occurrence each in Wales and Ireland. The folklorist S. P. Menefee suggested that it could be attributed to an animistic understanding that these megaliths had lives of their own.

Several modern Pagan religions are practiced at the Medway Megaliths, with Pagan activity having taken place at the Coldrum Stones from at least the late 1980s. These Pagans commonly associated the sites both with a concept of ancestry and of their being a source of "earth energy". The scholar of religion Ethan Doyle White argued that these sites in particular were interpreted as having connections to the ancestors both because they were created by Neolithic peoples whom modern Pagans view as their "own spiritual ancestors" and because the sites were once chambered tombs, and thus held the remains of the dead, who themselves may have been perceived as ancestors. On this latter point, Pagan perspectives on these sites are shaped by older archaeological interpretations. The Pagans also cited the Megaliths as spots marking sources of "earth energy", often aligned on ley lines, an idea probably derived ultimately from the publications of Earth Mysteries proponents like John Michell.

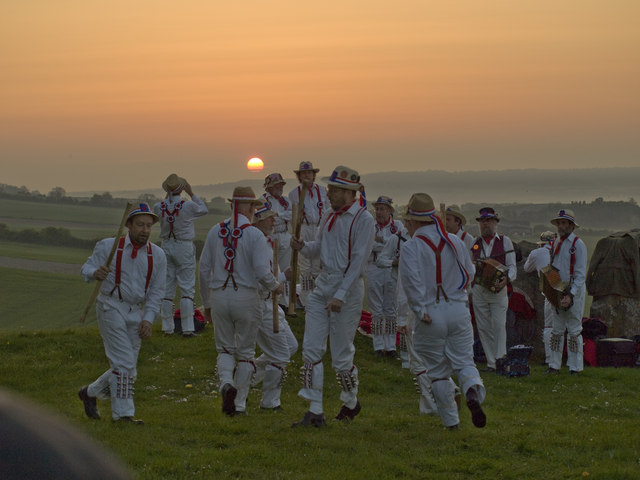
Morris Men dance at the Stones, May Day 2009

Pagans sometimes visit the site alone or in pairs, there to meditate, pray, or perform rituals, and some have reported experiencing visions there. A modern Druidic group known as Roharn's Grove hold regular rites at the site, particularly during the eight festivals that make up the Pagan Wheel of the Year. The Coldrums have also witnessed Pagan rites of passage; circa 2000, a handfasting—or Wiccan marriage ceremony—was held there. One member of the Odinic Rite, a Heathen organisation, gave their "oath of profession" to the group at the Coldrum Stones because they felt a particularly positive energy exists there. Politically motivated rituals have also been held at the site. In the late 1990s, the South London branch of the Paganlink organisation held a ritual at the Coldrum Stones in an unsuccessful attempt to prevent the construction of the Channel Tunnel Rail Link through the Medway Valley landscape. Another politically motivated Pagan rite was carried out there in the early 2010s by The Warrior's Call, a group seeking to prevent fracking in the United Kingdom by invoking "the traditional spirits of Albion" against it.

In the early 21st century, a tradition developed in which the Hartley Morris Men, a morris dancing side, meet at the site at dawn every May Day in order to "sing up the sun". This consists of dances performed within the stones on top of the barrow, followed by a song performed at the base of the monument. The trees overhanging the Coldrum Stones on its northern side have become rag trees, with hundreds of ribbons in various colours having been tied to their branches. This is a folk custom that some Pagans engage in, although it is also carried out by many other individuals; one Pagan has been recorded as saying that she tied a ribbon to the tree with her young son, both to make a wish for an improved future and as an offering to the "spirit of place". As of early 2014, runic carvings written in the Elder Futhark alphabet were also evident on the trunks of these trees, spelling the names of the Norse gods Thor and Odin; these had probably been carved by Heathens, members of a religious movement that worships these deities.

== Antiquarian and archaeological investigation ==
=== Early antiquarian descriptions ===
The earliest antiquarian accounts of Coldrum Long Barrow were never published. There are claims that at the start of the 19th century, the Reverend Mark Noble, Rector of Barming, prepared a plan of the site for Gentleman's Magazine, although no copies have been produced to verify this. Between 1842 and 1844, the Reverend Beale Poste authored Druidical Remains at Coldrum, in which he described the monument. This remained unpublished at the time. Associating the site with the druids of Britain's Iron Age, Poste's suggestion was that the name "Coldrum" derived from the linguistically Celtic "Gael-Dun", and that Belgic chiefs were interred there. He further reported that in both 1804 and 1825, skulls had been found at the site. In 1844, an antiquarian named Thomas Wright published a note on the Coldrum Stones and other Medway Megaliths in The Archaeological Journal. Wright had been alerted to their existence by a local vicar, the Reverend Lambert B. Larking, and proceeded to visit them with him. Describing the Coldrums, Wright mentioned "a smaller circle of stones" to the others in the area, with "a subterranean cromlech in the middle". He further added that "it is a tradition of the peasantry that a continuous line of stones ran from Coldrum direct to the well-known monument called Kit's Cotty [sic] House", attributing this belief to various megaliths scattered throughout the landscape.

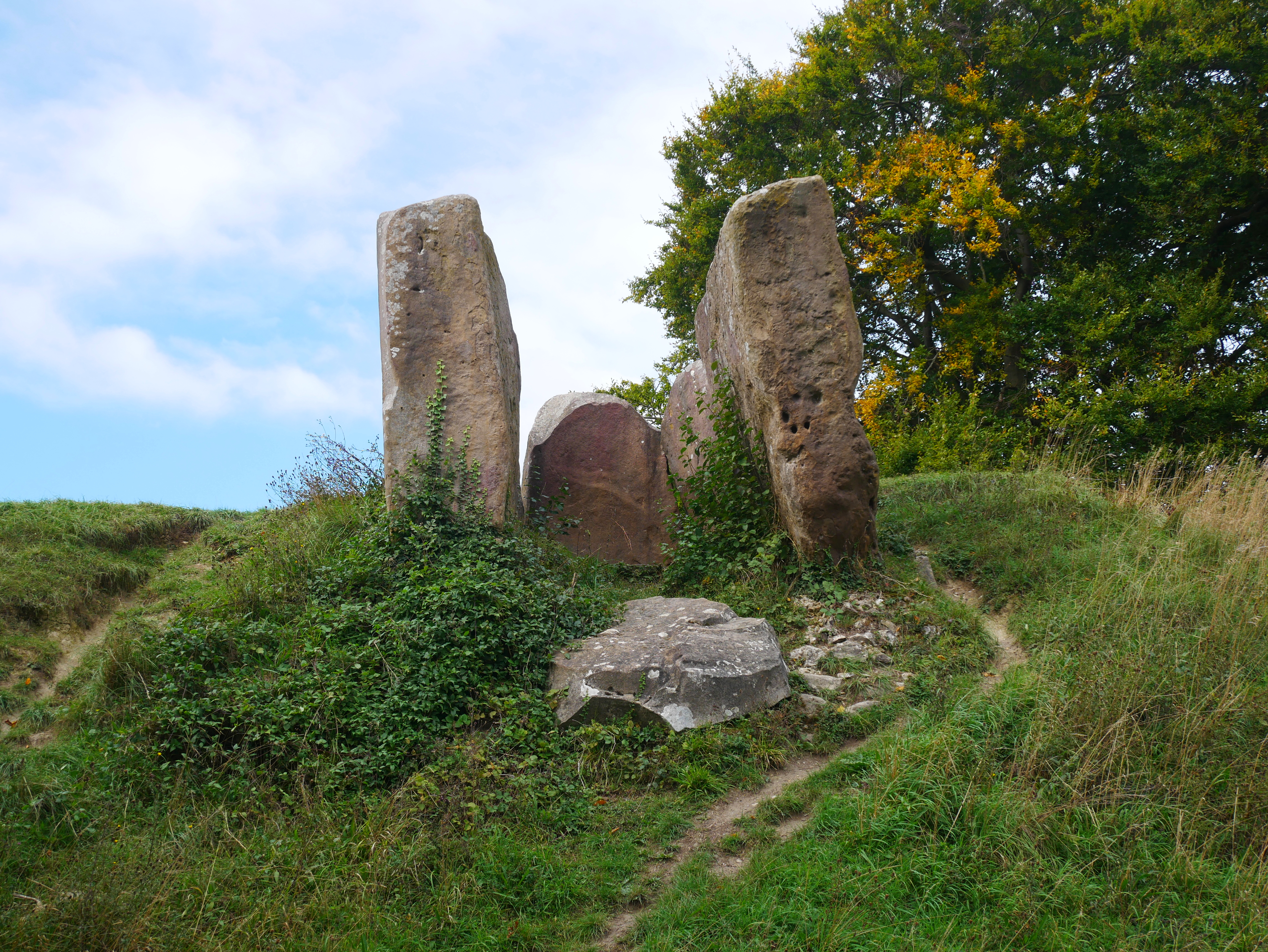
View looking west at the chamber from below

In 1857, the antiquarian J. M. Kemble excavated at the site with the help of the Reverend Larking, providing a report of their findings to the Central Committee of the British Archaeological Association. Describing the monument as a stone circle, they asserted that they discovered Anglo-Saxon pottery at the site, and noted that as well as being called the Coldrum Stones, the monument also had the name of the Adscombe Stones, which Kemble believed originated with the Old English word for funeral pile, ad. In August 1863, members of the Archaeological Institute—which was holding its week-long meeting in Rochester—visited the site, guided by the antiquary Charles Roach Smith. That year, the monument was described in a copy of Gentleman's Magazine by Yorkshire antiquary Charles Moore Jessop, who believed it to be a "Celtic" stone circle.

In 1869, the antiquarian A. L. Lewis first visited the site, and was informed by locals that several years previously a skull had been uncovered from inside or near to the chamber, but that they believed it to be that of a gypsy. A later account elaborated on this, stating that two individuals who excavated in the centre of the chamber without permission discovered a human skeleton, the skull of which was re-buried in the churchyard at Meopham. In an 1878 note published in The Journal of the Anthropological Institute of Great Britain and Ireland, Lewis noted that while many tourists visited Kit's Coty House, "very few goes to or ever hears of a yet more curious collection of stones at Colderham or Coldrum Lodge". He believed that the monument consisted of both a "chamber" and an "oval" of stones, suggesting that they were "two distinct erections". In 1880, the archaeologist Flinders Petrie included the existence of the stones at "Coldreham" in his list of Kentish earthworks; although noting that a previous commentator had described the stones as being in the shape of an oval, he instead described them as forming "a rectilinear enclosure" around the chamber. He then included a small, basic plan of the monument.

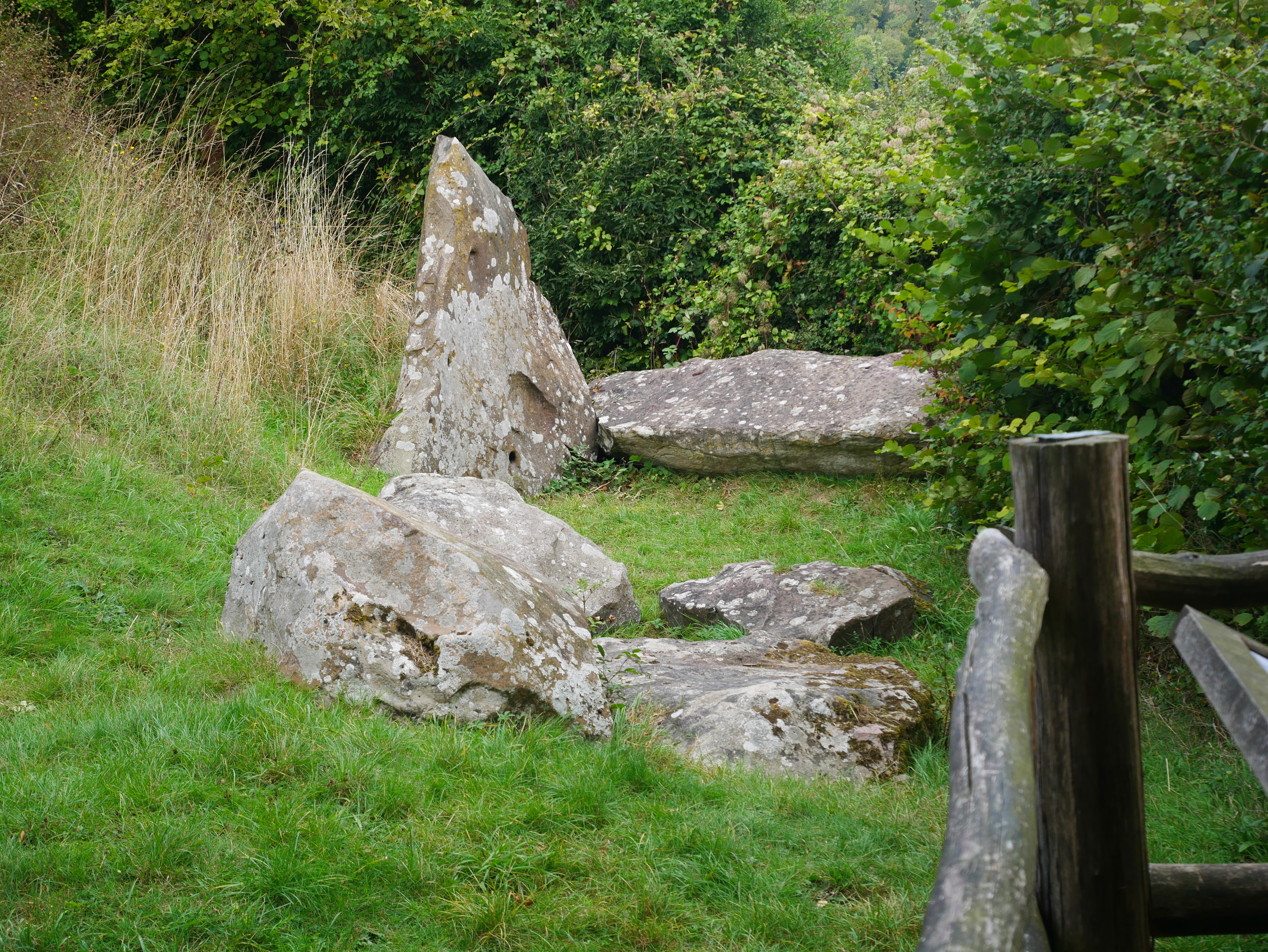
Stones that have fallen down the bank

In August 1889, two amateur archaeologists, George Payne and A. A. Arnold, came across the monument, which they noted was known among locals as the "Coldrum Stones" and "Druid Temple"; according to Payne, "the huge stones were so overgrown with brambles and brushwood that they could not be discerned". He returned the next year, noting that the brushwood had since been cut away to reveal the megaliths. In his 1893 book Collectanea Cantiana, Payne noted that although it had first been described in print in 1844, "since that time no one seems to have taken the trouble to properly record them or make a plan", an unusual claim given that a copy of Petrie's published plan existed in his library. For this reason, after gaining permission from the landowner, he convinced Major A. O. Green, Instructor in Survey at Brompton, to conduct a survey of the monument in August 1892. He also wrote to the archaeologist Augustus Pitt-Rivers, encouraging him to schedule the Coldrum Stones as a legally protected site under the Ancient Monuments Protection Act 1882. Payne described the Coldrum Stones as "the finest monument of its class in the county, and one worthy of every care and attention." Comparing it to other monuments of its type in Britain, he stated that it was undoubtedly "of sepulchral origin, belonging to a period anterior to the Roman domination of Britain." Payne also noted a folk tradition that there were stone avenues connecting Coldrum to the Addington Long Barrow, but added that he was unable to discover any physical evidence of this feature.

In 1904, George Clinch published a note on the Medway Megaliths in the Royal Anthropological Institute's journal, Man, in which he referred to the Coldrum Stones as "at once the most remarkable and the least known of the whole series." Suggesting that its design indicates that it was built during "a late date in the neolithic age", he compared the workmanship in producing the megaliths to that at Stonehenge, although noted that they differed in that the Coldrum Stones clearly represented "a sepulchral pile". Ultimately, he ended his note by urging for the site to be protected under the Ancient Monuments Protection Act 1900. In that same issue, Lewis included an added note in which he rejected the idea that the monument had once been covered by an earthen tumulus because he could see "no evidence that anything of that kind ever existed", and instead he interpreted the site as a stone circle, comparing it to the examples at Avebury, Arbor Low, and Stanton Drew, suggesting that the central chamber was a shrine.

=== Archaeological excavation ===
The Coldrum Stones have been excavated on multiple occasions. On 16 April 1910, the amateur archaeologist F. J. Bennett began excavation at the site, having previously uncovered Neolithic stone tools from Addington Long Barrow. He soon discovered human bones "under only a few inches of chalky soil" at Coldrum. He returned to the site for further excavation in August 1910, this time with his niece and her husband, both of whom were dentists with an interest in craniology; on that day they discovered pieces of a human skull, which they were able to largely reconstruct. A few days later he returned to excavate on the north-west corner of the chamber with the architect E. W. Filkins; that day, they found a second skull, further bones, a flint tool, and pieces of pottery. This pottery was later identified as being Anglo-Saxon in date.

"Some young man was selected, one of a family perhaps set apart, and had a very merry time during his year of god-ship, at the end of this, he was sacrificed at the dolmen [chamber], being led up the ascent, and his body was dismembered and the limbs and blood scattered over the fields to ensure fertility. His wife or wives may have been killed, too, and any child born during that year also, and their bones gathered together and buried within the dolmen."

— Bennett's interpretation of human sacrifice at the Coldrums, 1913.

Later that month, George Payne and F. W. Reader met with Bennett to discuss his finds. With the aid of two other interested amateur archaeologists, Mr Boyd and Miss Harker, both from Malling, excavation resumed in early September. In 2009, the archaeologists Martin Smith and Megan Brickley noted that Bennett's excavations had taken heed of Pitt-Rivers's advice that excavations should be recorded in full. They noted that Bennett had provided "clear plan and section drawings, photographs of the monument and careful attempts to consider site formation processes." Suggesting that the monument was constructed on agricultural land, in his published report Bennett cited the ideas of anthropologist James Frazer in The Golden Bough in proposing that the Coldrum Stones "may at one time have been dedicated, though not necessarily initially so, to the worship of the corn god and of agriculture." He believed that the human remains found at the site were the victims of human sacrifice killed in fertility rites; conversely, Evans later stated that "we have no means of knowing" whether human sacrifice had taken place at the site.

In September 1922, Filkins again excavated at Coldrum, this time with the aid of Gravesend resident Charles Gilbert. Their project was financed through grants provided by the British Association and the Society of Antiquaries, with Filkins noting that at the time of its commencement, "a miniature jungle" had grown up around the site which had to be cleared. Excavation continued sporadically until at least 1926. Human remains were discovered, and placed into the possession of Sir Arthur Keith of the Royal College of Surgeons. It is also recorded that at some point between 1939 and 1945 human remains that had been found at the site were reburied in the churchyard at Trottiscliffe. This excavation revealed all the existing sarsens surrounding the monument, several which had previously been buried. The stones of the chamber were shored up with concrete foundations where Filkins deemed it necessary. Although Filkins' excavation was comprehensive, it ignored stone holes, packing stones, and their relationship to the mound. In 1998, Ashbee noted that while from "a present-day perspective, it is possible to see shortcomings [in Filkins' excavation ...] in terms of the general standards of the early part of this century, there is much to commend."

=== Management by the National Trust ===
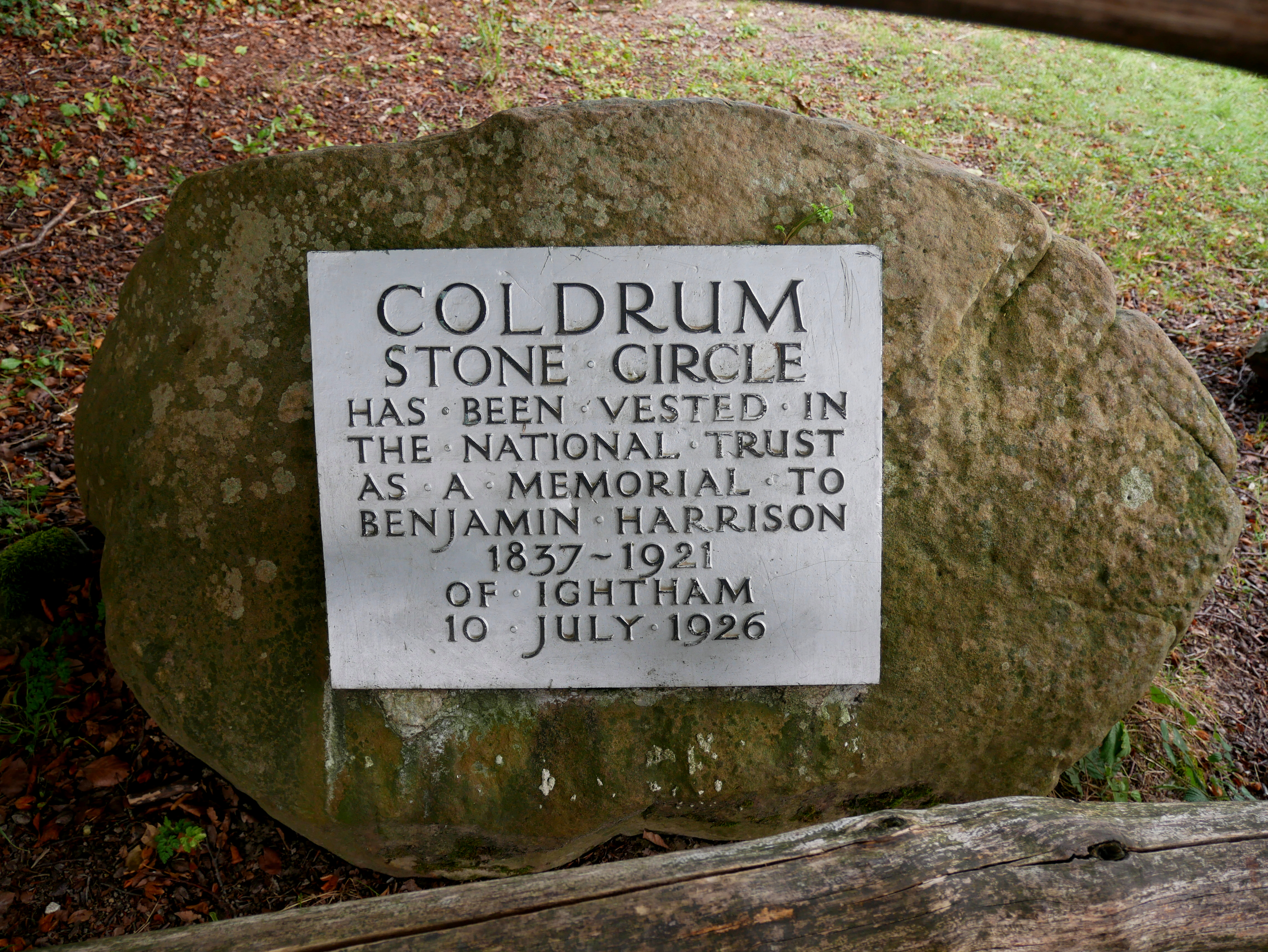
The National Trust epigraph at the site which erroneously refers to it as a "stone circle".

In his 1924 publication dealing with Kent, the archaeologist O. G. S. Crawford, then working as the archaeological officer for the Ordnance Survey, listed the Coldrum Stones alongside the other Medway Megaliths. In 1926, the Coldrum Stones were given to the National Trust, a charity which dedicated it as a memorial to the Kentish prehistorian Benjamin Harrison. A plaque was erected to mark this, which erroneously termed the monument a stone circle; in 1953, the archaeologist Leslie Grinsell expressed the view that "it is hoped that this error may be rectified in the near future". Still owned by the Trust, the site is open to visitors all year round, free of charge. On their website, the Trust advises visitors to look for "stunning views from the top of the barrow". John H. Evans characterised the site as "the most impressive" of the Medway Megaliths, while Grinsell described it as "the finest and most complete" of the group.

Among the Pagans who use the Coldrum Stones for their ritual activities, there is general satisfaction with the Trust's management of the site, although some frustration at the poor access for disabled visitors. A patch of scorched earth exists on the grass in the centre of the monument, perhaps used by Pagans as well as non-Pagans, and the Trust warden responsible for the site has decided to leave it there rather than seeding it over, in order to encourage any who do light fires to do so in the same spot rather than nearer to the stones themselves. The site also faces a problem from litter left by visitors, with Pagans who regularly visit the site cleaning this up.
