= Trottiscliffe =

Village in Kent, England

Coordinates: 51.31997°N 0.36072°E

- Location within Kent
- Population: 485 (2011 Census)
- OS grid reference: TQ64606052
- District: Tonbridge and Malling
- Shire county: Kent
- Region: South East
- Country: England
- Sovereign state: United Kingdom
- Post town: West Malling
- Postcode district: ME19
- Dialling code: 01732
- Police: Kent
- Fire: Kent
- Ambulance: South East Coast
- UK Parliament: Tonbridge

Trottiscliffe (/ˈtrɒtiskliff/ trottis-cliff) is an English village in the county of Kent about 2.5 miles (4 km) north west of West Malling.

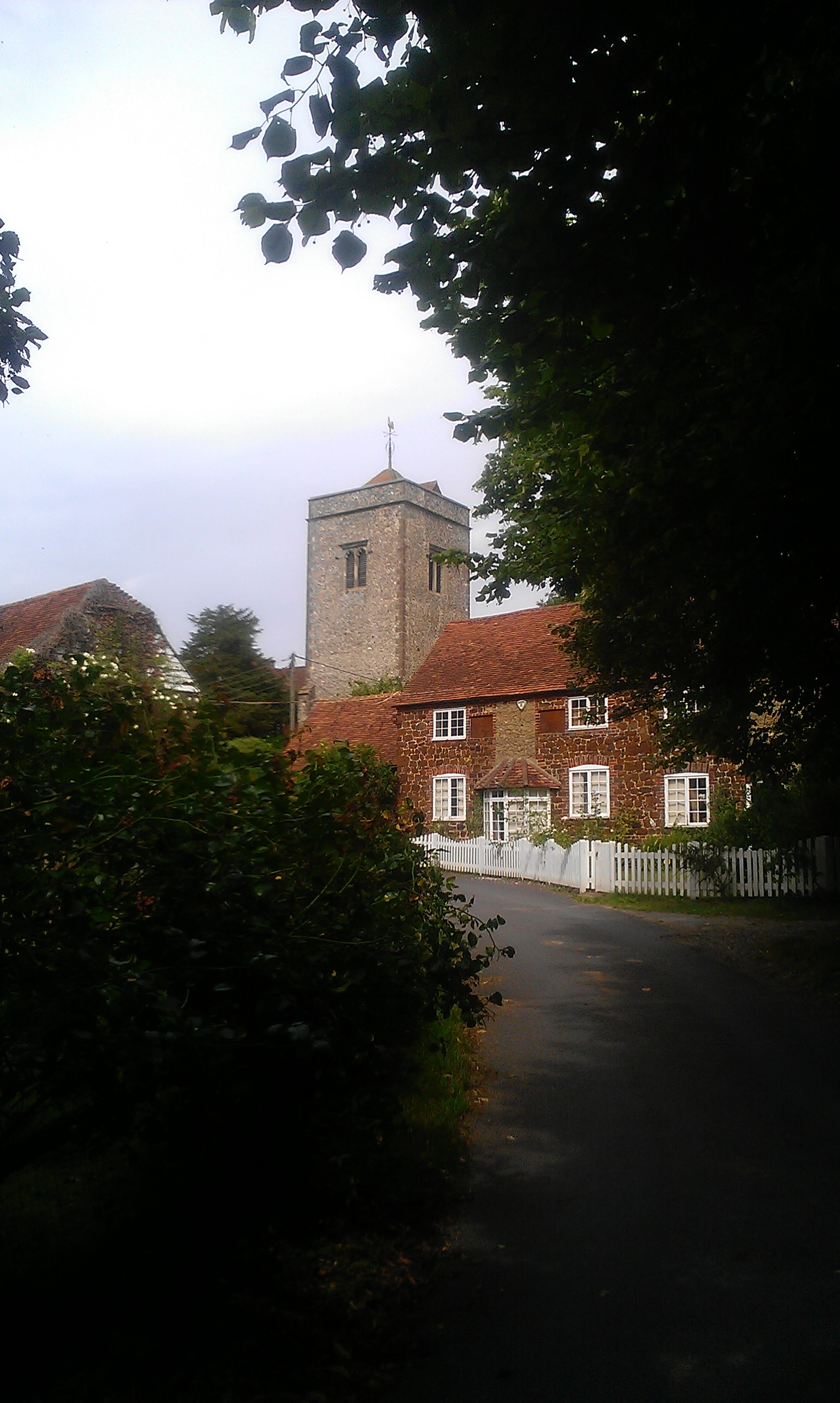
The church tower.

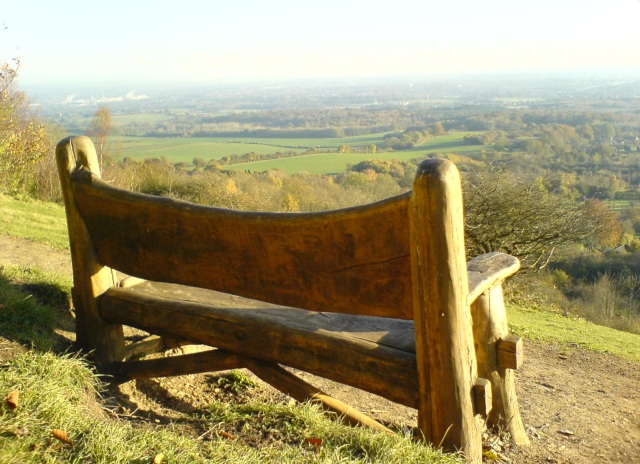
The Pilgrims' Way runs near Trottiscliffe

It is colloquially known as Trosley to villagers which may be why the name was chosen for Trosley Country Park at the top of the North Downs, which was once part of the Trosley Towers Estate. The spelling Trottesclyve appears with nearby Hallyng in 1396. It was labelled as Trotterscliffe on the Ordnance Survey map published in 1870.

== Historic buildings ==
Its most notable features are the Neolithic Coldrum Long Barrow and the medieval Church of St Peter and St Paul.

== Notable residents ==
Trottiscliffe was the English home of artist Graham Sutherland from 1937 until his death in 1980. He was buried by Trottiscliffe parish church.

== See also ==
- Listed buildings in Trottiscliffe
